= Nejla Işık =

Turkish environmental activist and community leader

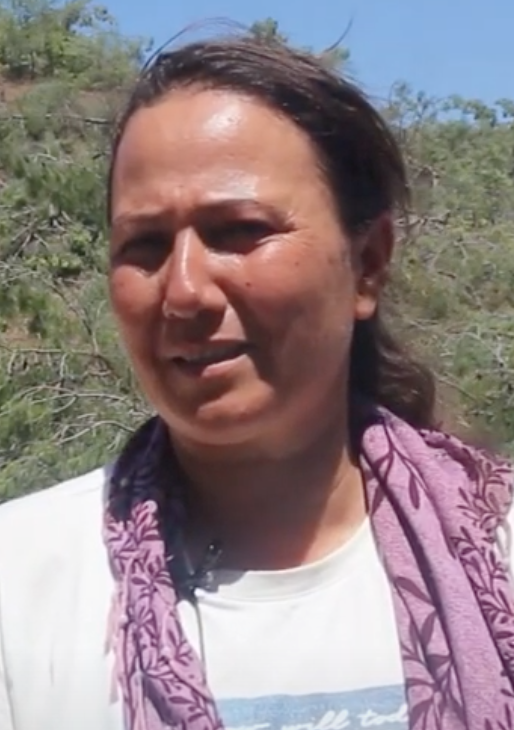
- Işık in 2023
- Occupations: Environmental activist, community leader
- Years active: 2019–present
- Known for: Akbelen resistance
- Children: 2
- Honours: BBC 100 Women (2024)

Nejla Işık is a Turkish environmental activist and community leader who has been involved in efforts to prevent deforestation in the Akbelen Forest. She was elected as the mukhtar of İkizköy in 2024 and was recognized internationally for her role in environmental advocacy.

== Career ==
Işık emerged as an environmental activist and community leader in İkizköy. She became involved in the resistance against deforestation of the Akbelen Forest, which had been allocated for coal mining activities by the Ministry of Agriculture and Forestry to supply nearby power plants, such as Kemerköy or Yeniköy. This resistance, known as the Akbelen Resistance, began in 2017 as the forest faced threats from expanding mining projects.

In 2019, Işık, alongside other activists, started a watch to prevent deforestation. Their efforts included legal action and protests. By 2023, the movement experienced intense clashes with authorities and the mining company, including fines and other deterrent measures. Following these struggles, a court decision in 2024 canceled plans to expropriate land for further mining.

On March 31, 2024, Işık was elected as the mukhtar of İkizköy, winning against her rival candidate by 93 to 71 votes. Her candidacy was supported by the İkizköy Environment Committee that she previously chaired and driven by her commitment to resisting the mining projects threatening the area. Her leadership has been marked by continued activism, including public speeches advocating for the preservation of local natural and cultural resources.

In December 2024, Işık was named one of the BBC's "100 Women of 2024," under the category of climate pioneers. The list highlighted her five-year struggle to protect the Akbelen Forest and her resilience in the face of opposition from both corporate and state actors.

== Personal life ==
Işık is a mother of two, now adults, and belongs to a family that actively participated in the Akbelen Resistance, including members of the older generation in their 80s.

== Esra Işık ==
In March 2026 there was a verbal altercation between Nejla’s daughter Esra Işık and officials sent to survey the land. Esra Işık was detained and charged with insulting public officials and obstructing their duties. Her defence said that she did not know the people were officials and did not physically obstruct them.

== See also ==
- Environmental issues in Turkey
- Forests in Turkey
- Deniz Gümüşel
