= Deniz Gümüşel =

Turkish environmentalist

Deniz Gümüşel is a Turkish environmental engineer and climate expert. Gümüşel is a member of the İkizköy Environment Committee and the Right to Clean Air Platform.

In July 2023, Gümüşel was prohibited by Turkish courts from attending the deforestation protest at Akbelen Forest. Gümüşel had previously spoken to Balkan Insight about the negative environmental impact of the deforestation. Gümüşel was arrested after taking part in the protest and later shared images of her injured arms online.

Gümüşel was previously arrested after protesting against YK Energy during the Olive Harvesting Festival in Muğla Province in 2022. Prosecutors dropped all charges after concluding that she broke no law.

== See also ==
- Nejla Işık
