= Soma power station =

Coal fired power station in Turkey

- Country: Turkey
- Coordinates: 39°11′42″N 27°38′07″E
- Status: Operational
- Commission date: 1981
- Owners: Konya Seker; Anadolu Birlik Holding

Thermal power station
- Primary fuel: Lignite

Power generation
- Nameplate capacity: 660 MW; 990 MW
- Annual net output: 3,714 GWh (2022); 3,866 GWh (2020); 4,177 GWh (2021); 5,059 GWh (2019)

Soma power station (formerly Soma B power station) is a 990 MW coal-fired power station in Soma, Manisa in western Turkey. In 2020 of the 6 units 2 were shut down. Steam from the plant is used for residential heating in the winter. It is on the Global Coal Exit List compiled by the NGO Urgewald.

== Illness and deaths due to air pollution ==
According to Greenpeace Soma is the deadliest power station in Turkey, and deadlier than any power station in Europe, being responsible for 13 thousand lost years of life and 282 thousand lost working days in 2010. Although the company is contracted to install pollution control, such as desulpherization it may not be financially viable to do so.

== Subsidies ==
In 2018 the plant received 110 million lira capacity payments, and 148 million in 2019 both the largest in Turkey. In 2025 the plant was reported to be in financial difficulty.

== Coal ==
According to Global Energy Monitor the power station burns lignite from the nearby Soma and Deniş coal mines. However analyst Haluk Direskeneli says that the plant does not have a dedicated mine but relies on low-quality dusty lignite from state-run Turkish Coal Enterprises (TKİ) which industry does not want to buy.
