= Emba Hunutlu power station =

Coal fired power station in Turkey

- Country: Turkey
- Coordinates: 36°48′58″N 35°51′17″E
- Status: operational
- Construction began: September 2019
- Commission date: 2022
- Construction cost: $2,100 million
- Owners: Aviation Industry Corporation of China; State Power Investment Corporation
- Employees: 500

Thermal power station
- Primary fuel: Coal
- Cooling source: Seawater

Power generation
- Nameplate capacity: 1,320 MW
- Annual net output: 4,016 GWh (2022)

External links
- Website: embapower.com

Emba Hunutlu power station is a 1320 MW coal fired power station in Turkey in Adana Province. As of 2022 it is the largest Chinese foreign direct investment in the country. Despite opposition from many environmental organisations the plant was started up in 2022 and burns Russian coal as it is cheaper than other coal. The plant is less than 2 km from another coal-fired power station, İsken Sugözü.

== History ==
The project was proposed in 2012. In 2015 it was licensed, despite environmental protests, and Shanghai Electric Power said it would be China's largest ever direct investment in Turkey.

In April 2019 a Belt and Road Initiative deal was signed to build the 1320 MW power station and construction started in September. It is also part of Turkey's Middle Corridor.

In June 2022 opposition Republican People's Party Adana deputy Burhanettin Bulut called for a Parliamentary inquiry, complaining that the power plant was about to be started up despite ongoing lawsuits and a one hundred thousand signature petition.

Unit 1 started up in July 2022 and the other unit in October.

== Ownership ==
The project is a joint venture between Shanghai Electric Power (a subsidiary of China's State Power Investment Corporation), Avic-Intl Project Engineering Company (3%), and two Turkish local investors, Mete Bülgün, CEO of the joint venture and Adnan Demir (9.4% each) with Shanghai Electric Power holding 78%.

== Finance and economics ==
The finance is 20% capital and the rest a 15-year $1.381 billion loan from China Development Bank, Bank of China and Industrial and Commercial Bank of China.

In 2021 Turkey targeted net zero carbon emissions by 2053. According to Banktrack the project is struggling with finance. However others say the builders will make a profit.

=== Subsidies ===
By 2020, according to Carbon Tracker, both new wind and solar power were cheaper than building new coal power plants; and they forecast that wind would become cheaper than existing coal plants in 2027, and solar in 2023: so they say that constructing the plant is a waste of money. However the company benefited from value-added tax exemptions of almost 3.5 billion lira in 2016. WWF say it will make a loss.

== Construction ==
Test piles have been constructed and in April 2019 Shanghai Electric Power said that "the successful signing of the facility agreement indicates that the project construction will enter into a fast-growth period". However construction of the coal silos was delayed.

== Employment ==
The company says it will employ 4000 people in construction and 500 in operation.

== Design and specification ==
The thermal power station has 2×660 MW Ultra Super critical units with steam pressure of 27 MPa and reheat steam temperature of 600°C.

=== Coal supply ===
Imported coal is stored in 3 large sea side silos, and the plant can also run on local coal.

== Electricity generation ==
=== Efficiency ===
The design is for gross efficiency up to 46% with a gross coal consumption rate less than 270 g/kWh (7000 kcal/kg LHV standard coal).

=== Cooling system ===
The plant is cooled by water from Iskenderun Bay.

== Waste products ==
=== Local air pollution control ===
==== Nitrogen Oxides ====
The selective catalytic reduction is designed to be more than 70% efficient, and according to the company will reduce NOx emissions to less than 100mg/Nm3.

==== Sulfur Dioxide and Dust ====
The design is for a combination of electrostatic precipitators, flue-gas desulfurization and wet scrubbers to reduce dust emissions to less than 5mg/Nm3.

==== Mercury ====
Mercury was not mentioned in the Environmental Impact Assessment but has been estimated at 175.5 kg/year.

== Health and safety ==
A public meeting was due to be held in January 2022 to discuss the environmental impact report for Emba Hunutlu, with the owners now adding 43 MW of wind and 37 MW of solar (the electricity for use on site), to the 1320 MW of coal power which had been due to open in 2021. The company say that they devote themselves to building a power plant with "no pollution". But environmental groups estimate that air pollution from the power station would cause an extra 50 early deaths per year. Another estimate is that closing the plant by 2030, instead of when its licence ends in 2064, would prevent over 5000 premature deaths.

The company has published safety guidelines.

== Environmental effects ==
An expert report in 2020 concluded that the plant would be contrary to the İskenderun Bay (Adana-Mersin-Hatay) Integrated Coastal Areas Plan's principles, and opponents say it contravenes the Biodiversity Convention.

=== Water ===
According to WWF-Turkey the project threatens the loggerhead sea turtles and green sea turtles which nest on nearby Sugözü Beach. Quoting the project environmental impact assessment as saying that the outgoing cooling water will be 7°C higher than the sea water, they say temperatures could exceed 35°C in summer and be fatal to the turtles. Coal shipments and delivery might also disturb the turtles.

=== Dust ===
As of 2019 Turkey has no legal limit on fine particulate (PM2.5) emissions. The Health and Environment Alliance say that TurkStat figures show respiratory diseases have already increased in Adana Province, and that could be due to other coal-fired power stations.

=== Greenhouse gases ===
Shanghai Electric Power Company says it is "sustainable power generation" but the power station will increase Turkey's greenhouse gas emissions: if operational according to its design capacity factor and lifetime it will emit over 200 million tonnes of carbon dioxide.

Climate TRACE estimates it emitted over 5 million tons of the country's total 730 million tons of greenhouse gas in 2022: the company is on the Urgewald Global Coal Exit List.

== Opposition ==
TEMA Foundation filed a lawsuit in 2017 and in 2018 several other organisations under the grouping of Doğu Akdeniz Çevre Platformu (East Mediterranean Environment Platform) were in ongoing legal action in Ankara.

== See also ==
- Energy policy of Turkey
- List of power stations in Turkey
- Electricity sector in Turkey
