= List of active coal-fired power stations in Turkey =

There are 55 plants which generate coal power in Turkey including autoproducers, (Note: Steelworks with blast furnaces, like Erdemir and İsdemir, burn coal or coke to make steel but generate electricity from blast furnace gas or waste heat so are not listed here) more than any other European country except Russia. (Note: There are no unlicensed coal-fired power stations.) (Note: The table titled “2023 Yılı Sonu İtibarıyla Elektrik Piyasası Ön Lisans ve Üretim Lisansı Dağılımı“ in the executive summary of the 2023 EMRA report totals 15 + 23 + 15 = 53 coal power licences - but as ZETES 1 2 and 3 have the same licence if counted as separate power stations the total would be 55. As of 2026 the Energy Ministry website says there are 69, however that is not an official number. However TMMOB disagree with a 2024 Turkish Coal Association report there are 54 plants altogether (but they may be counting ZETES as one plant -see pages 29 to 31 of https://www.komurder.org/uploads/Haber-Galerisi/2024/euas-ve-komurder-isbirligi/euas_ve_komurder_isbirligi.pdf))

== Coal-fired power stations ==
Location of operational coal-fired power stations larger than 10 megawatts in Turkey

Station	Installed capacity (MW_{e})	Generation to grid in 2019 (GWh) (Note: If you are Turkish you can get a user-id and log in to the Energy Exchange Istanbul (EXIST) transparency platform "Real-Time Generation" option and see a graph of a power station's generation for a period of time up to 3 months, with the total below the graph. Recent generation by unit can be seen on the "Final Daily Production Program" option by first entering the company name and then dropping down the list of unit names. Even so some small power stations may not show on the platform if they do not sell to the grid (that is they are just autoproducers).) (Note: In 2018 coal-fired power stations gross generation was 113 terawatt hours (TWh), which was 37% of total gross generation. The figures in the table below are net generation.)	Capacity factor in 2019 (%) (Note: By routine calculations from the 2 columns to the left as described in Capacity factor#Sample calculations – note that there are 366 days in 2020)	Province and district	Construction or operational start year (Note: Where the construction year is not known, the start of the current EDPK operational license is shown – nevertheless there may have been "pre-licenses" before that.)	Owner	Type	Coal type	Retirement	Notes	Ref (Note: Public information about a power station (e.g. Cenal) can be displayed from the Turkish Energy Market Regulatory Authority database as follows. Click the bracketed letter link in its cell below (e.g. [n]) and copy the license number (e.g. EÜ/4315-42/02574) into the "Lisans No." box on the query screen. Tick "Ben robot değilim" (I am not a robot) and then press the "Sorgula" (query) button. Ignore the co-ordinates as they are garbage data. A translation of the column headers and drop down selection may be helpful..) (Note: As of 2021 there is no web service for this at https://www.epdk.gov.tr/Detay/Icerik/21-35/web-servisleri so to attempt to list operational coal-fired power stations from the licence database enter: "Lisans Durumu"="Yürülükte" (license status=In force),"Tesis Türü"="Termik" (facility type=Thermal) and "Tesis Durumu"="İşletmede" (facility status=In business). Then tick "Ben robot değilim" (I am not a robot) and "Sorgula" (Query) which should list licensed, operational thermal power stations. Click "Raporla" (Report) to download it. Repeat with "Tesis Durumu"="Kısmi İşletmede" (facility status=Partly in business). Using your spreadsheet software merge the 2 downloads, select "Yakıt Türü"="Kömür" (Fuel=Coal) OR "İthal Kömür" (Imported Coal) OR "Yerli Kömür" (Local Coal) OR "Yerli Asfaltit" (Local Asphaltite). Then sort by "Tesis Adı" (Facility Name). A translation of the column headers and drop down selection may be helpful. When copying the operational capacity into Wikipedia or Wikidata be sure to copy MWe which is the last power column.)
18 Mart Çan a.k.a. Çan	320	2134	76	Çanakkale Çan	2003	EÜAŞ	Subcritical	Lignite	Unknown		(Note: EÜ/101-44/020)
Adapazarı Sugar Factory a.k.a. Ada Şeker a.k.a. Sakarya	10.4	13	Unknown as some electricity might have been used by the factory	Sakarya Adapazarı	2014	Adapazarı Sugar	Unknown	Lignite	Unknown	Captive power plant: no output to grid first half 2020	(Note: EÜ/4969-177/2877)
Afşin Elbistan A	1355	1899	16	Kahramanmaraş Afşin	1984–1987	EÜAŞ	Subcritical	Lignite	Unknown		(Note: EÜ/8263-5/04139)
Afşin Elbistan B	1440	2773	22	Kahramanmaraş Afşin	2004–2005	EÜAŞ	Subcritical	Lignite	Unknown		(Note: EÜ/101-43/019)
Albayrak Balıkesir Cogeneration a.k.a. Albayrak TES	40	57	8	Balıkesir Balıkesir	2019	Varaka Paper	Unknown	Imported	Unknown	Averages 150 tons steam from 27 tons coal per hour	(Note: EÜ/6660-5/03613)
Atlas	1260	8502	81	Hatay İskenderun	2014	Diler Holding via Atlas Enerji	Supercritical	Imported	Unknown	Diler is on the Global Coal Exit List.	(Note: EÜ/1813-3/1274)
Aynes Cogeneration a.k.a. Aynes Gıda	6	9	18	Denizli Acıpayam	2014	Aynes Food	Unknown	Lignite	Unknown		(Note: EÜ/4969-230/2930)
Eti Maden Bandirma power station a.k.a. Bandırma Boron Factory a.k.a. Bandırma Boraks	36	53	17	Bandırma Acıpayam	2014	ETİ Maden	Unknown	Lignite	Unknown		(Note: EÜ/4969-196/2896)
Bekirli-1 a.k.a. Biga a.k.a. İçdaş Çelik Enerji	405	3164	89	Çanakkale Biga	2005 (unit 1), 2009 (units 2–3)	İÇDAŞ	Subcritical	Imported	Unknown		(Note: EÜ/1435-26/1041)
Bekirli-2 a.k.a. Bekirli	1200	8658	82	Çanakkale Biga	2011 (unit 1), 2015 (unit 2)	İÇDAŞ	Supercritical	Imported	Unknown		(Note: EÜ/1160-3/833)
Beypazarı ETİ Soda Cogeneration a.k.a. ETİ Soda	20	94	54	Ankara Beypazarı	Unknown	Ciner Group via ETİ Soda	Unknown	Lignite	Unknown		(Note: EÜ/4969-120/2820)
Bolluk a.k.a. Alkim Konya	1	2	19	Konya Cihanbeyli	2014	Alkim Alkali Chemicals	Unknown	Lignite	Unknown		(Note: EÜ/4969-2/2702)
Bolu Göynük a.k.a. Aksa Göynük TES	270	1964	83	Bolu Göynük	2015	Kazancı Holding	Subcritical fluidized bed	Lignite	Unknown	Dusts air and ground. Uses 1.8 million tons of lignite with a thermal value of 2,450 kcal/kg per year.	(Note: EÜ/3734-19/2290)
Cenal	1320	9167	79	Çanakkale Biga	2017	Alarko Holding and Cengiz Holding via Cenal Elektrik	Ultra-Supercritical	Imported Bituminous	Unknown	Cenal is on the Global Coal Exit List.	(Note: EÜ/4315-42/02574)
Çan-2	330	1524	53	Çanakkale Çan	2018	ODAŞ Group		Lignite	Unknown		(Note: EÜ/6083-2/03428)
Çankırı Salt Factory Cogeneration a.k.a. Med-mar Sağlık	2	9	64	Çankırı Çankırı	2014	Med-mar	Unknown	Lignite	Unknown		(Note: EÜ/4969-240/2940)
Çatalağzı a.k.a. Yeni Çatalağzı	314	1494	54	Zonguldak Kilimli	1979 (opening:1989)	Aydem Enerji	Subcritical	Anthracite	Unknown		(Note: EÜ/5358-1/03178)
Çaycuma a.k.a. Oyka Paper	8.5			Zonguldak Çaycuma	2014	OYAK		Imported	Unknown	An unofficial source says started 2019	(Note: EÜ/4969-56/2756)
Çayırhan	620	4312	79	Ankara Nallıhan	1987–2000	Akçadağ Holding	Subcritical	Lignite	Unknown		(Note: EÜ/5088-4/03041)
Çayırhan Sodium Sulphate Cogeneration a.k.a. Alkim Çayırhan	3	9	39	Ankara Nallıhan	2014	Alkim Alkali Chemicals	Unknown	Unknown	Unknown		(Note: EÜ/4969-16/2716)
Çoban Yıldızı power stations a.k.a. Çumra Termik Santrali a.k.a. Çobanyıldızı (Cumra)	37	35	11	Konya Çumra	2015	Anadolu Birlik Holding via Konya Sugar (in Turkish)	Unknown	Lignite	Unknown	At Çumra Campus	(Note: EÜ/5603-8/03299)
Çoban Yıldızı power stations a.k.a. Çumra	24	35	Unknown as some electricity might have been used by the factory	Konya Çumra	2014	Anadolu Birlik Holding via Konya Sugar (in Turkish)	Unknown	Lignite	Unknown	Supplies both sugar factory and grid. Claimed to be most environment friendly factory in Turkey.	(Note: EÜ/4969-46/2746)
Çolakoğlu a.k.a. Çolakoğlu-2	190	1191	72	Kocaeli Gebze	2003	Çolakoğlu Metalurji	Subcritical	Bituminous	Unknown		(Note: EÜ/4969-33/2733)
Dazkırı Cogeneration a.k.a. Alkim Afyon	3	16	72	Afyonkarahisar Dazkırı	2014	Alkim Alkali Chemicals	Unknown	Lignite	Unknown		(Note: EÜ/4969-24/2724)
Göknur	2	0	Unknown as some electricity might have been used by the factory	Niğde Niğde	2014	Göknur Food	Unknown	Unknown	Unknown	Captive power plant: no output to grid 2019 or first half 2020	(Note: EÜ/4969-153/2853)
İsken Sugözü a.k.a. Sugözu İsken a.k.a. İskenderun	1320	7110	61	Adana Yumurtalık	2003	OYAK	Subcritical	Hard coal, anthracite	Unknown		(Note: EÜ/8886-12/04341)
İzdemir	350	2484	81	İzmir Aliağa	2014	İzdemir Enerji	Supercritical	Imported	Unknown		(Note: EÜ/2116-8/1490)
Kahramanmaraş Paper Factory	16	73	Unknown as some electricity might have been used by the factory	Kahramanmaraş Kahramanmaraş	2014	Kahramanmaraş Paper	Unknown	Imported	Unknown		(Note: EÜ/4969-202/2902)
Kangal	457	2588	65	Sivas Kangal	1989 (Unit 1) 1990 (Unit 2) 2000 (Unit 3)	Anadolu Birlik Holding via Konya Sugar (in Turkish)	Subcritical	Lignite	Unknown	On the Global Coal Exit List	(Note: EÜ/4537/02625)
Kardemir a.k.a. Karabük	78	546	80	Kütahya Karabük	Unknown	Kardemir A.Ş.	Unknown	Hard coal	Unknown	May need update to meet 2020 standards	(Note: EÜ/4969-204/2904)
Kemerköy	630	4128	75	Muğla Gökova	1994 (units 1–2), 1995 (unit 3)	Yeniköy Kemerköy Elektrik	Subcritical	Lignite	Unknown		(Note: EÜ/5358-2/03180)
Kipaş Paper Factory	8	1	Unknown as some electricity might have been used by the factory	Kahramanmaraş Türkoğlu	2014	Kipaş Holding	Unknown	Imported	Unknown		(Note: EÜ/4969-259/2959)
Küçüker Cogeneration	5	34	Unknown as some electricity might have been used by the factory	Denizli Denizli	2014	Küçüker Textiles	Unknown	Lignite	Unknown		(Note: EÜ/4969-211/2911)
Kütahya Sugar Factory	7	7	Unknown as some electricity might have been used by the factory	Kütahya Kütahya	2014	Kütahya Sugar factory	Unknown	Lignite	Unknown		(Note: EÜ/4969-212/2912)
Orhaneli	210	1570	85	Bursa Orhaneli	1992	Çelikler Holding	Subcritical	Lignite	Unknown		(Note: EÜ/5642-3/03300)
Polat a.k.a. Polat-1	51	132	30	Kütahya Tavşanlı	2013	Polatyol	Circulating fluidized bed	Lignite	Unknown		(Note: EÜ/1866-11/1342)
Seydişehir a.k.a. ETİ Alüminyum	14	33	27	Konya Seydişehir	2014	ETİ Aluminium	Unknown	Lignite	Unknown		(Note: EÜ/4969-236/2936)
Seyitömer	600	3968	75	Kütahya Kütahya	1973–1989	Çelikler Holding	Subcritical	Lignite	Unknown		(Note: EÜ/4447/02616)
Soma Kolin	510	2527	57	Manisa Soma	2019	Kolin Group	Circulating fluidized bed	Lignite	Unknown	The environmental impact assessment does not mention greenhouse gas (sera gaz) emissions.	(Note: EÜ/5906-18/03394)
Soma a.k.a. Soma A	44	0	Unknown as some electricity might have been used for other purposes	Manisa Soma	1957	EÜAŞ	Unknown	Lignite	Unknown	No output to grid 2019 or first half 2020	(Note: EÜ/6604-3/03635)
Soma B a.k.a. Soma	660	5059	Unknown as the steam is also used for residential heating	Manisa Soma	1981–1992	Anadolu Birlik Holding via Konya Sugar (in Turkish)	Subcritical	Lignite	Unknown	Of the six 165 MW units, 2 units are shut down and 4 units operating under temporary license. Steam from the power station is used for residential heating in the winter.	(Note: EÜ/5642-1/03298)
Şırnak Silopi a.k.a. Silopi	405	2324	66	Şırnak Silopi	2013 (unit 1), 2015 (units 2–3)	Ciner Group	Circulating fluidized bed	Asphaltite	Unknown	May need update to meet 2020 standards Although technically not coal the solid fuel is treated similarly by regulators so is included here.	(Note: EÜ/308-3/424)
Tufanbeyli	450	3283	83	Adana Tufanbeyli	2016	Sabancı Holding via Enerjisa	Circulating fluidized bed	Lignite	Unknown		(Note: EÜ/298-1/415)
Tunçbilek	365	Unknown	Unknown	Kütahya Tavşanlı	1973	Çelikler Holding	Subcritical	Lignite	Unknown	Not listed on "real time generation" query so no generation figure shown	(Note: EÜ/5642-4/03301)
Yatağan	630	3764	68	Muğla Yatağan	1984 (units 1–2), 1986 (unit 3)	Aydem Enerji	Subcritical	Lignite	Unknown		(Note: EÜ/5327/03164)
Yeniköy	420	2997	81	Muğla Milas	1986–1987	Yeniköy Kemerköy Elektrik	Subcritical	Lignite	Unknown		(Note: EÜ/5358-3/03181)
ZETES-1	160	1141	81	Zonguldak Zonguldak	2010	Eren Holding via Eren Enerji	Circulating fluidized bed	Bituminous	Unknown	Licensed as "Çatalağzı Termik" together with other ZETES	(Note: EÜ/369-1/479)
ZETES-2	1230	8931	83	Zonguldak Zonguldak	2010	Eren Holding via Eren Enerji	Supercritical	Bituminous	Unknown	Licensed as "Çatalağzı Termik" together with other ZETES	(Note: EÜ/369-1/479)
ZETES-3	1400	9212	75	Zonguldak Zonguldak	2016	Eren Holding via Eren Enerji	Supercritical	Bituminous	Unknown	Licensed as "Çatalağzı Termik" together with other ZETES	(Note: EÜ/369-1/479)
Total	19,223										

However, the energy ministry says total installed capacity 21,931 MW (perhaps the difference is net vs gross that is operational vs installed).

== See also ==
- Electricity sector in Turkey#Future
- Energy policy of Turkey
- Greenhouse gas emissions by Turkey
- Environmental issues in Turkey
- Climate change litigation#Turkey
- Category:Coal mines in Turkey
