= IC Holding =

Turkish holding company

- Industry: Conglomerate
- Website: icholding.com.tr

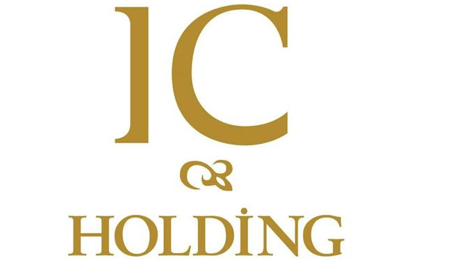
IC Holding logo

IC Holding, is a private conglomerate in Turkey including construction (IC İçtaş İnşaat), electricity generation (IC İçtaş Energy) and tourism (IC Hotels). It was founded by the current Chairman İbrahim Çeçen. İbrahim Çeçen's son, Fırat Çeçen is the Vice Chairman, who is also the Chairman of IC Ibrahim Cecen Investment Holding.

With Limak Holding it has a subsidiary IC İçtaş Energy which owns two coal-fired power stations in Turkey, Kemeköy power station and Yeniköy power station, and locals have protested that that company has cut down trees in Akbelen Forest to expand the open pit coal mine which feeds the power stations. In 2022 criticism of their air pollution continued.

Climate TRACE estimates IC İçtaş Energy’s coal-fired power stations emitted over 5 million tons of the country's total 730 million tons of greenhouse gas in 2022, and it has been put on the Urgewald Global Coal Exit List.
