= South Aegean coal mines =

Coal mines in Muğla, Turkey

The South Aegean coal mines are lignite mines in Muğla Province in Turkey formerly all owned by Southern Aegean Lignite Enterprises, but now some by YK Energy (so those are sometimes known as Yenikoy Lignite Mines). They supply Kemerköy, Yeniköy and Yatağan power plants, such as Yatağan coal mine and Milas coal mine.

Some people say mines such as Turgut are damaging the environment. There have been protests against the cutting of part of Akbelen Forest.
