= Eren Holding =

Turkish holding company

- Type: Private
- Industry: Conglomerate
- Founded: 1997
- Headquarters: Istanbul, Turkey
- Area served: Worldwide
- Products: Energy; Cement; Paper
- Services: Retail
- Revenue: $5 billion (2022)
- Number of employees: 14,000
- Subsidiaries: List: Eren Energy Medcem Cement
- Website: erenholding.com.tr/en

Eren Holding is a conglomerate headquartered in Istanbul, Turkey. It has business interests in paper, packaging, cement, energy, retail and textiles. The holding company was established in 1997, although the history of the group dates back to 1969.

Eren Holding's chairman is Emir Eren. The group employs 14,000 people. In 2022 Eren Enerji generated 5% of the country's electricity, second to EÜAŞ at 15%. Due to its coal-fired power stations subsidiary Eren Enerji and its cement production it is one of the largest private sector greenhouse gas emitters in Turkey.

== History ==
Eren was established by four brothers from Bitlis. In 1969, Er-os Çamaşırları A.Ş., an underwear manufacturer and trademark, was established. In 1998, Eren Holding entered the energy sector with Modern Enerji Elektrik Üretim Otoprodüktör Grubu A.Ş. In 2003, the Rixos Hotel was opened in Bodrum, marking the company's entry into the tourism industry. In 2007, Eren Enerji started construction of a 1360 MW coal-fired power plant in Zonguldak, which was completed in 2010. In 2012, Eren Perakende created the multi-brand shoe concept SuperStep stores and multi-brand kids store chain SuperKids. In 2014, a 6 MW biomass power plant started operating. In 2015, Modern Enerji established the first solid waste incineration facility in Turkey. Also in 2015, Modern Karton completed construction of a new paper factory.

In the late 2010s, Eren Holding’s power plants generated 7.5% of Turkey’s electricity. In 2019, Eren Enerji Elektrik Üretim A.Ş received a silver award in the industry and energy category of the Green World Awards. That was criticized by environmental organizations as greenwashing.

== Operations ==
Eren Holding controls businesses across several sectors, including energy, paper, cement, retail, ports, packaging and textiles. It owns ports in Zonguldak and Mersin. Its subsidiaries Eren Kağıt and Modern Karton collect waste paper and recycle it into corrugated fiberboard. Eren owns Turkey's biggest cement factory—Medcem Çimento—in Mersin. As local demand collapsed in 2019, the factory concentrates on exports.

ErenTekstil A.Ş. manufactures cotton textiles. Eren Perakende represents a number of international brands in Turkey, including Lacoste, Burberry, GANT, Nautica and Converse. In addition to its physical stores, it sells online through Occasion, Sanal Çadır, SuperStep and FashFed e-commerce sites.

Eren Holding's subsidiary Eren Enerji owns the coal-fired ZETES power stations. Another energy subsidiary, Modern Energy, owns a solid waste incineration facility and natural gas-fired and biomass-fired power plants in Çorlu.

== Greenhouse gas emissions ==
Due to its coal-fired power stations, coal-fired steam boiler and cement factory in Silifke, Eren is one of the largest private sector greenhouse gas emitters in Turkey. As the owner of the most coal-fired electricity generating capacity in Turkey the company is on the Urgewald Global Coal Exit List, and is one of the largest greenhouse gas emitters in the country: however although corporate emissions measurements are reported to the government they are not published. Climate Trace estimates Eren Energy’s coal-fired power plants emitted 18 million tons, over 2%, of the country’s greenhouse gas in 2025. Medcem Cement Group was estimated to emit over 4 million tonnes in 2025.
