= İsken Sugözü power station =

Coal fired power station in Turkey

- Country: Turkey
- Coordinates: 36°50′06″N 35°52′48″E
- Status: Operational
- Commission date: 2003
- Owner: OYAK

Thermal power station
- Primary fuel: Bituminous coal

Power generation
- Nameplate capacity: 1,210 MW; 1,308 MW
- Annual net output: 7,110 GWh (2019); 8,121 GWh (2021); 8,268 GWh (2022); 9,075 GWh (2020)

External links
- Website: www.isken.com.tr

İsken Sugözü power station is a 1320 MW operational coal fired power station in Turkey.

== History ==
The plant started operating in 2003.

== Ownership ==
STEAG had 51% share and OYAK 49%. In 2025 Steag sold its share to OYAK.

== Health and environmental impact ==
=== Local pollution ===
There is a lot of heavy industry around Iskenderun Bay, including two other coal-fired power stations, Atlas and Emba Hunutlu. Cancers increased in the decade since the plant started and respiratory diseases increased during the 2010s, but because smokestack measurements are only sent to the government not published, it is difficult to estimate how much of the air pollution illnesses and deaths are due to the power plants. However İsken Sugözü is the oldest and the only one using subcritical technology, so is likely to be more polluting per GWh electricity generated than the other two coal-fired power stations (a study for China estimated 200 to 400 early deaths per GW-year). Mercury emissions have been estimated at over 200 kg/year. It is estimated that closing the plant by 2030, instead of when its licence ends in 2039, would prevent over 3000 premature deaths.

As well as the plant discharging into the bay, a ship carrying coal ash was wrecked there.

=== Greenhouse gases ===
As Turkey has no carbon emission trading it would not be economically viable to capture and store the gas. Climate TRACE estimates it emitted over 6 million tons of the country's total 730 million tons of greenhouse gas in 2022: the company is on the Urgewald Global Coal Exit List.

== Opposition ==
There were protests by Greenpeace and others. Opposition to the power plant carried forward to opposition to Emba Hunutlu power station in the late 2010s.

== See also ==
- Energy in Turkey
- List of power stations in Turkey
- Electricity sector in Turkey
