= Esra Işık =

Turkish environmental activist (born 1999)

Esra Işık (born c. 1999) is a Turkish human rights activist. She is known for her campaigns against coal mining in the Akbelen Forest, as well as the expropriation of agricultural land and olive groves for industrial projects.

== Biography ==
Işık was born and raised in İkizköy, a neighbourhood in Milas, Muğla Province, Turkey. She is the daughter of the neighbourhood's community leader, Nejla Işık. In 2019, she began campaigning against the Turkish government's decision to cut down olive groves near her home to make way for coal mining.

In 2023, Işık became the spokesperson for an environmental agency during disputes over the clearing of the Akbelen Forest for the purpose of coal mining. She became a face of the long-standing Akbelen community resistance, which she has described as the struggle for "land, water, production, and the survival of the villages". Işık campaigned to protect forests, fields and water sources from the impact of coal mining. In October 2023, Işık led a renewed vigil of community members after their previous vigil location and protest camp was cleared by Turkish officials.

On 31 March 2026, Işık was arrested after leading protests during a court-ordered site visit as part of expropriation proceedings, during which she got into a verbal dispute with an official attempting to survey the land; she was later remanded in pre-trial custody. She faced charges of "insulting" and "resisting the orders of a public official"; her lawyer argued that Işık was not aware that the individual was an official and denied allegations that she had physically obstructed them.

As a result of Işık's arrest, a joint statement by 241 civil society groups called for her release. On 1 April 2026, rallies in support of Işık took place in Istanbul, Izmir, Ankara, Çanakkale and Muğla. In April 2026, trade unionist Başaran Aksu and trainee lawyer Doğukan Akan were briefly detained on charges of disseminating misleading information after publicly supporting Işık on social media.

In April 2026, Işık's appeal against her detention was unsuccessful, and in July she was sentenced to 2 years and 1 month imprisonment.
