= Çolakoğlu power station =

Coal fired power station in Turkey

- Country: Turkey
- Status: Operational
- Commission date: 2000
- Owner: Çolakoğlu Metalurji

Thermal power station
- Primary fuel: Bituminous coal

Power generation
- Nameplate capacity: 190 MW
- Annual net output: 1,024 GWh (2022); 1,189 GWh (2021); 1,191 GWh (2019); 1,272 GWh (2020)

Çolakoğlu power station (also known as Çolakoğlu-2 or Gebze Çolakoğlu) is a 190-megawatt coal-fired power station in Turkey in Gebze, Kocaeli Province, which burns imported and local coal. The company called Marmara Elektrik is part of Çolakoğlu Group, and has been put on the Urgewald Global Coal Exit List.
