= İÇDAŞ =

Turkish holding company

- Industry: Conglomerate
- Founded: 1969
- Headquarters: Istanbul, Turkey
- Area served: Turkey
- Products: energy, steel, shipyards, ports, logistics
- Number of employees: 10,000
- Subsidiaries: List: ICDAS Electric Production and Investment ICDAS Steel, Energy, Shipbuilding and Transportation Industries ICDAS Electrical Energy Wholesale Trade Imports and Exports
- Website: icdas.com.tr

İÇDAŞ, is a conglomerate in Turkey with businesses in construction, concrete production, energy, and mining services. Due to its coal-fired power stations it is one of the largest greenhouse gas emitters in Turkey.

ICDAS Electric Production and Investment A.Ş. owns the coal-fired İÇDAŞ Bekirli-1 and İÇDAŞ Bekirli-2 power stations.

Climate TRACE estimates these coal-fired power stations emitted over 8 million tons of the country's total 730 million tons of greenhouse gas in 2022, and it has been put on the Urgewald Global Coal Exit List.
