= 18 Mart Çan power station =

Coal fired power station in Turkey

- Country: Turkey
- Coordinates: 40°01′18″N 26°58′28″E
- Status: Operational
- Commission date: 2006
- Owner: Electricity Generation Company

Thermal power station
- Primary fuel: Lignite

Power generation
- Nameplate capacity: 320 MW
- Annual net output: 2,034 GWh (2022); 2,041 GWh (2021); 2,134 GWh (2019); 515 GWh (2020)

External links
- Website: www.euas.gov.tr/tr-TR/santraller/18-mart-can

18 Mart Çan power station (also known as Çan power station) is a coal-fired power station in Turkey in Çan, which burns lignite mined locally and belongs to the state power company. It was shut down in March 2021 but reopened after a flue-gas desulfurization system was installed at a cost of US$45.9 million.

In June 2021 İklim Değişikliği Politika ve Araştırma Derneği (Climate Change Policy and Research Association) said the plant should be shut down for operating without an environmental permit.
