= Çelikler Holding =

Turkish holding company

- Industry: Conglomerate
- Headquarters: Ankara, Turkey
- Area served: Turkey
- Products: energy, construction, mining, concrete
- Subsidiaries: List: Çelikler Seyitömer Electricity Generation Co. Celikler Electricity Kömürsan Mining
- Website: celiklerholding.net

Çelikler Holding is a conglomerate in Turkey with businesses in construction, concrete production, energy, and mining services. Due to its coal-fired power stations in Turkey it is a large private sector greenhouse gas emitter in Turkey and is on the Urgewald Global Coal Exit List.

Çelikler Seyitömer Electricity Generation Co. owns the coal-fired Afşin-Elbistan A, Orhaneli, Seyitömer and Tunçbilek power stations.
