= Çoban Yıldızı power stations =

Coal fired power station in Turkey

- Country: Turkey

Thermal power station
- Primary fuel: Lignite

The Çoban Yıldızı power stations are 2 autoproducer coal-fired power stations in Turkey in Konya province owned by Konya Sugar which is in turn owned by Anadolu Birlik Holding.

The one licensed EÜ/4969-46/2746 is called Çumra and according to the licence database it is in Çumra but no coordinates are given. The company calls it Çobanyıldızı.

The one licensed EÜ/5603-8/03299 is also called Çumra and the licence database gives its coordinates in Cumra.

The company website is unclear whether one is at their sugar factory in Konya city.
