= İzdemir power station =

Coal fired power station in Turkey

- Country: Turkey
- Location: Horozgediği
- Coordinates: 38°44′30″N 26°55′45″E
- Status: Operational
- Commission date: 2014
- Owner: İzdemir Energy

Thermal power station
- Primary fuel: Bituminous coal

Power generation
- Nameplate capacity: 350 MW
- Annual net output: 2,423 GWh (2021); 2,484 GWh (2019); 2,541 GWh (2020); 2,715 GWh (2022)

External links
- Website: www.izdemirenerji.com

İzdemir power station is a 350-megawatt coal-fired power station in Turkey in İzmir Province, which burns imported coal. Although coal is the primary fuel the plant can also run on fossil gas.

Climate TRACE estimated it emitted nearly two million tons of greenhouse gas in Turkey in 2022, and the company has been put on the Urgewald Global Coal Exit List.
