= Cengiz Holding =

Turkish conglomerate

- Industry: Construction, energy, Mining
- Founded: 1980
- Headquarters: Üsküdar, Istanbul, Turkey
- Key people: Mehmet Cengiz, Ekrem Cengiz, Şeref Cengiz
- Revenue: $5 billion
- Number of employees: 43.000+
- Website: www.cengiz.com.tr

Cengiz Holding A.S. is a Turkish conglomerate, with major interests in construction, energy, mining, and tourism. Its assets include the Eti Copper and Eti Aluminium mining companies. It is owned by Mehmet Cengiz. In 2012 it had around $470m revenue from construction.

In May 2013, it was part of a joint venture which won the EUR22bn contract to construct a third international airport in Istanbul. In July 2013 it was part of a joint venture which acquired the daily newspaper Akşam, together with TV channel Sky Turk 360 and radio station Alem FM, for TL60m.

== Greenhouse gas emissions ==
Climate Trace estimates half-owned Cenal coal-fired power plant emitted over 7 million tons of the country’s total 730 million tons of greenhouse gas in 2022. So it is on the Urgewald Global Coal Exit List.

The company says that "Emissions at the [aluminium] production units in Seydişehir are already."y 50% lower than European Union standards", however it still runs a small coal-fired power station at that factory.
