= CFB =

CFB may refer to:

- College football, in the United States
- Canadian Forces base, military installation of the Canadian forces
- Caminho de Ferro de Benguela, railway in Angola
- Carrollton-Farmers Branch Independent School District
- Cipher feedback, a block cipher mode in data encryption
- Clube de Futebol «Os Belenenses», a football club in Portugal
- Continental flood basalt, large volumes of dominantly tholeiitic basalt on continents
- Complement factor B, a protein
- Compact fluorescent bulb
- Current feedback, a type of electronic feedback used in some operational amplifiers
- Circulating fluidized bed, a type of fluidized bed used in power plants
- Commission fédérale des banques (Swiss Federal Banking Commission)
- CFB, the IATA code for Cabo Frio International Airport
- CFB, the National Rail station code for Catford Bridge railway station
- CFB is acronym for Call Forwarding when Busy telecom service
- Circulating fluidized bed combustion
- Cfb, one of four symbols for the Oceanic climate under the Köppen climate classification system
- Cytophaga-Flavobacteria-Bacteroides group, a previous name for the current Bacteroidota phylum
- Change From Baseline, a tool used in clinical trials to measure the safety and efficacy of therapeutic interventions
- Swedish Central Federation for Voluntary Military Training
