= Kangal power station =

Coal fired power station in Turkey

- Country: Turkey
- Coordinates: 39°04′40″N 37°17′43″E
- Status: Operational
- Commission date: 1989
- Construction cost: $985 million
- Owners: Konya Seker; Anadolu Birlik Holding

Thermal power station
- Primary fuel: Lignite

Power generation
- Nameplate capacity: 457 MW
- Annual net output: 1,881 GWh (2020); 2,390 GWh (2022); 2,530 GWh (2021); 2,588 GWh (2019)

Kangal power station is a 457 MW coal-fired power station in Turkey in Sivas, mostly built in the late 20th century, which burns lignite mined locally. The plant is owned by Anadolu Birlik Holding via Konya Şeker and in 2018 received 51 million lira capacity payments. The area is a sulfur dioxide air pollution hotspot, and agricultural soil is contaminated with chromium, nickel and mercury.
