= Soma Kolin power station =

Coal fired power station in Turkey

- Country: Turkey
- Coordinates: 39°19′01″N 27°44′53″E
- Status: Operational
- Commission date: 2019
- Owner: Koloğlu Holding

Thermal power station
- Primary fuel: Lignite

Power generation
- Nameplate capacity: 510 MW
- Annual net output: 2,527 GWh (2019); 3,236 GWh (2021); 3,247 GWh (2020); 3,498 GWh (2022)

Soma Kolin power station is a 510-megawatt coal-fired power station in Turkey in Manisa Province, which burns lignite mined locally. The planned original site was changed after local protests. Both units were funded by Turkish banks, built by Harbin Power Equipment, are subcritical and started generating in 2019.

The project cost 1.78 billion lira. The plant is owned by Koloğlu Holding (via Hidro-Gen Enerji) and receives capacity payments. Hidro-Gen is on the Urgewald Global Coal Exit List, however although corporate greenhouse gas emissions measurements are reported to the government they are not published.Climate Trace estimates the plant emitted over two million tons of carbon dioxide in 2022.
