= Biga power station =

Coal-fired power station in Turkey

Bekirli‑1
- Country: Turkey
- Coordinates: 40°26′37″N 27°07′50″E
- Status: Operational
- Commission date: 2005
- Owner: İÇDAŞ

Thermal power station
- Primary fuel: Bituminous coal

Power generation
- Nameplate capacity: 405 MW
- Annual net output: 2,659 GWh (2022); 2,799 GWh (2020); 2,943 GWh (2021); 3,164 GWh (2019)

Biga power station (also known as Bekirli-1 or İçdaş Çelik Enerji or İÇDAŞ Değirmencik and different from nearby İÇDAŞ Biga-2 but owned by the same company) is a 405 MW coal-fired power station in Turkey in Değirmencik, Biga, in Çanakkale built in the early 21st century.

It is estimated that closing the plant by 2030, instead of when its licence ends in 2056, would prevent over 2000 premature deaths.
