= Yazıcı =

Yazıcı or Yaziji is a Turkish surname, meaning 'clerk'.

Yazici may refer to:

== Surname ==
- Ali Nihat Yazıcı, Turkish chess official
- Birsen Yazıcı, Turkish-American electrical engineer
- Fatma Yazıcı, Turkish billionaire businesswoman
- Hayati Yazıcı, Turkish lawyer and politician
- Merve Yazıcı (born 1992), Turkish female deaf taekwondo practitioner
- Oğuzhan Yazıcı, German politician
- Serap Yazıcı, Turkish academic
- Tahsin Yazıcı, Turkish army officer
- Yusuf Yazıcı, Turkish footballer

== Others ==
- Yazıcı Dam, dam in Turkey
- Karayazıcı, 16th-century Ottoman rebel

== See also ==
- Yaziji / Yazigi
