= Polat power station =

Coal fired power station in Turkey

- Country: Turkey
- Coordinates: 39°36′58″N 29°26′36″E
- Status: Operational
- Commission date: 2014
- Construction cost: $76 million
- Owner: Polatyol
- Employees: 250

Thermal power station
- Primary fuel: Lignite

Power generation
- Nameplate capacity: 51 MW
- Annual net output: 132 GWh (2019); 147 GWh (2020); 229 GWh (2021); 253 GWh (2022)

External links
- Website: www.polatyol.com/en/activities/power/thermal-reactor

Polat power station is a 51-megawatt coal-fired power station in Turkey in Kütahya Province, which burns lignite and receives capacity payments. Its owner is on the Global Coal Exit List compiled by the NGO Urgewald.
