= Çan-2 power station =

Coal fired power station in Turkey

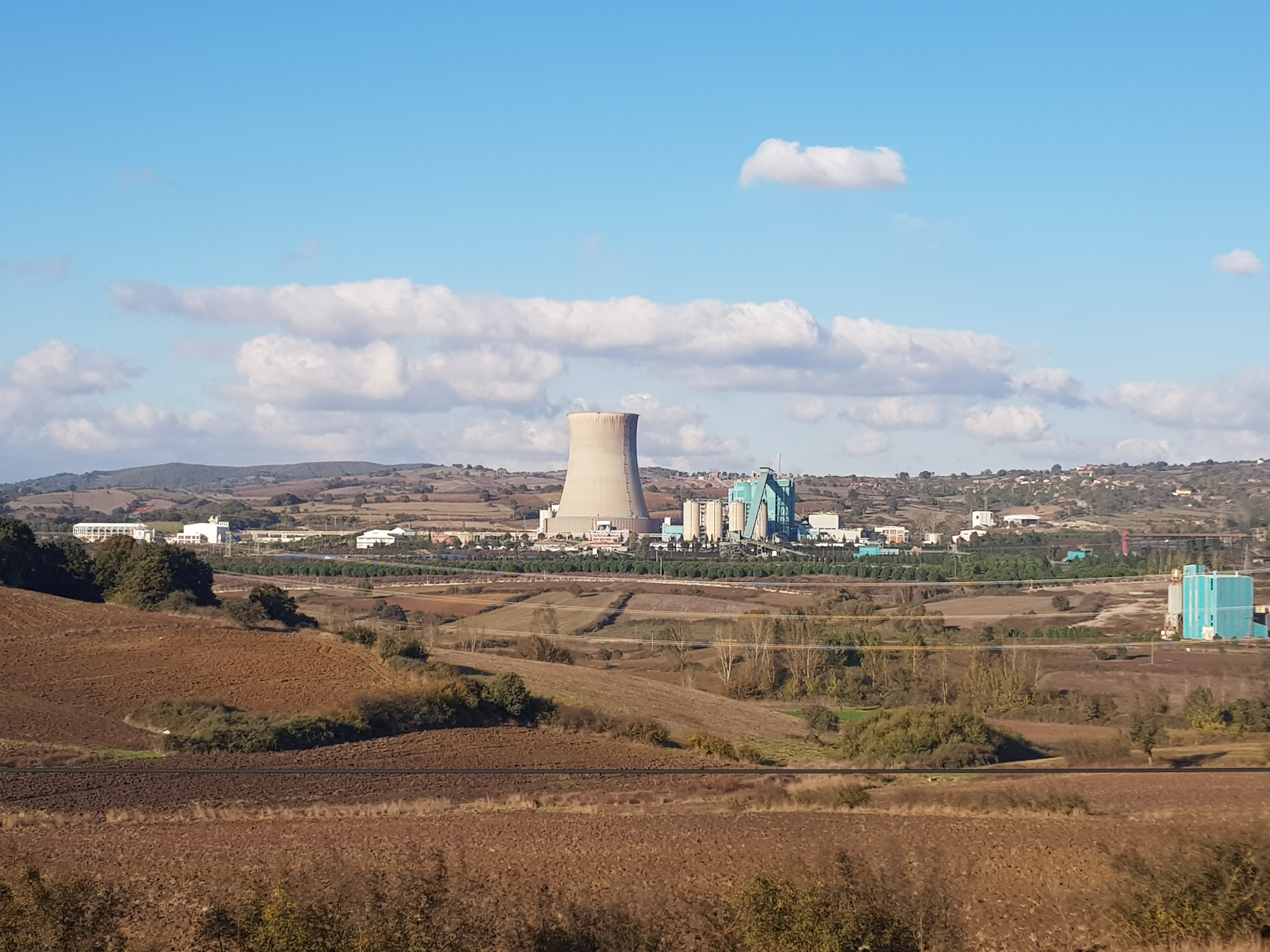
- Country: Turkey
- Coordinates: 40°02′04″N 26°57′02″E
- Status: Operational
- Commission date: 2018
- Owner: ODAŞ Group

Thermal power station
- Primary fuel: Lignite

Power generation
- Nameplate capacity: 330 MW
- Annual net output: 1,524 GWh (2019); 1,859 GWh (2023); 1,866 GWh (2020); 2,000 GWh (2021); 2,304 GWh (2022)

External links
- Commons: Related media on Commons

Çan-2 power station is a 330-megawatt coal-fired power station in Turkey in Çanakkale Province, which burns local lignite. It is owned by Odaş Elektrik, part of Odaş Group. Odaş Elektrik has been put on the Urgewald Global Coal Exit List.
