= Fatma Yazıcı =

Turkish businesswoman

- Born: 1973 or 1974 (age 52–53)
- Occupation: businesswoman
- Known for: largest shareholder in Diler Holding
- Spouse: Recep Sami Yazici (deceased)
- Children: 3

Fatma Tuba Yazıcı (born 1973/74) is a Turkish billionaire businesswoman. Together with her three sons, she is the largest shareholder in Diler Holding.

Diler Holding owns Diler Iron and Steel, Yazici Iron and Steel, Diler Investment Bank and the 2,000-bed Cornelia Deluxe Hotel in Antalya.

Her husband Recep Sami Yazici died unexpectedly in 2009. Vargı is widowed, with three children, and lives in Istanbul, Turkey.
