= Albayrak Balıkesir cogeneration power station =

Coal fired power station in Turkey

Albayrak Balıkesir Cogeneration
- Country: Turkey
- Status: Operational
- Commission date: 2019
- Owner: Albayrak Group

Thermal power station
- Primary fuel: Bituminous coal
- Cogeneration?: Yes

Power generation
- Nameplate capacity: 40 MW
- Annual net output: 242 GWh (2022); 255 GWh (2021); 258 GWh (2020); 57 GWh (2019)

External links
- Website: www.varaka.com/cevre-dostu-kagit-fabrikasi/

Albayrak Balıkesir cogeneration power station is a small coal-fired power station in Turkey in Balıkesir Province. The power station is cogeneration in that it generates both electricity and steam for SEKA Balıkesir paper factory.
