= Kemerköy power station =

Coal fired power station in Turkey

- Country: Turkey
- Coordinates: 37°02′08″N 27°54′03″E
- Status: Operational
- Commission date: 1993
- Owners: IC Holding; Limak Holding

Thermal power station
- Primary fuel: Lignite

Power generation
- Nameplate capacity: 653 MW
- Annual net output: 3,504 GWh (2020); 3,518 GWh (2021); 4,128 GWh (2019); 4,846 GWh (2022)

Kemerköy power station is a 630 MW coal-fired power station in Turkey in Kemerköy, Muğla, completed in 1985, which burns lignite mined locally. Originally state owned by Electricity Generation Company it was sold in 2014 to Limak- IC İçtaş. In 2020 it received 140 million lira ($25,000,000) capacity payments.

The smokestack of the facility has a height of 300 metres.

The area is a sulfur dioxide air pollution hotspot and as of 2017 the air pollution caused by Kemerköy and neighboring Yatağan power station and Yeniköy power station is estimated to have caused 45,000 premature deaths. It is estimated that closing the plant by 2030, instead of when its licence ends in 2063, would prevent over 5000 premature deaths.

In 2019 local people protested against 48 villages being destroyed by expansion of the mine feeding the plant. The company has been granted a permit to cut down Akbelen Forest to make way for the mine expansion, but in 2021 inhabitant of İkizköy village continue to protest and filed a lawsuit claiming that the permit should not have been granted without an environmental impact assessment. The company says that Akbelen was allocated to the coal mine when the power plant was built, and that the General Directorate of Forestry defined it as an “industrial plantation area for 2019”. In July 2025 the government legislated that mining companies will not have to wait for EIA approval from the ministry before extending the mine.

The plant was inspected by Istanbul Technical University in 2019 before new pollution regulations came into force at the beginning of 2020, and they made various improvement recommendations, such as better groundwater monitoring near the ash ponds. Despite improvements such as better air filters not being completed on all units, the plant was allowed to operate on a temporary licence in 2020, and in January 2021 the plant was granted a second temporary operating licence with a requirement to submit an environmental report to the ministry in June. The plant was evacuated due to and slightly damaged by the 2021 Turkish wildfires. The company Yenikoy Kemerkoy Elektrik Uretim ve Ticaret AS is on the Global Coal Exit List compiled by the NGO Urgewald. The Chamber of Engineers said in 2026 that if the plant was closed it would not cause a shortage of electricity either nationally or regionally.
