= YK Energy =

Turkish energy company

Yeniköy Kemerköy Enerji, known as YK Energy, is a government-linked energy company in Turkey.

== History ==
Since 2014, the company has been owned by IC Ictas and Limak Group, following a US$2.67 billion purchase.

In July and August 2023, the company's deforestation of Akbelen Forest was met with protests in nearby İkizköy and sparked a national discussion. In July 2025 the government legislated that mining companies will not have to wait for EIA approval from the ministry before extending the mine.
