= Yatağan power station =

Coal fired power station in Turkey

Yatağan Thermal Power Plant
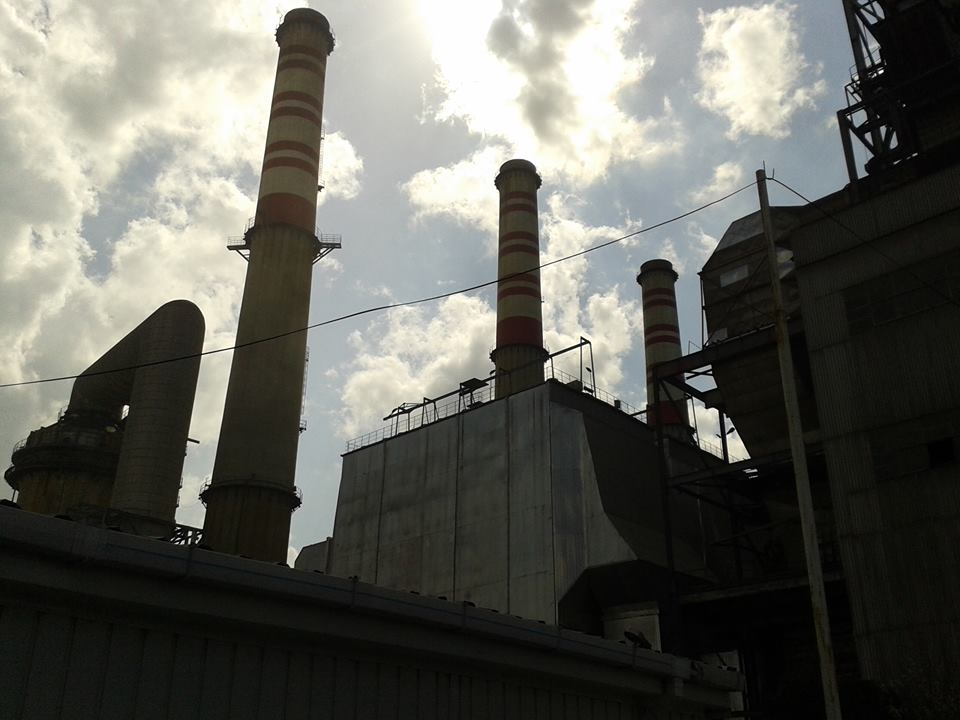
- Country: Turkey
- Coordinates: 37°20′N 28°06′E
- Status: Operational
- Commission date: 1982
- Owner: Aydem Energy

Thermal power station
- Primary fuel: Lignite

Power generation
- Nameplate capacity: 630 MW
- Annual net output: 3,461 GWh (2022); 3,764 GWh (2019); 3,835 GWh (2020); 4,071 GWh (2021)

External links
- Website: www.yatagantermik.com.tr

Yatağan Power Station is a coal-fired power station in Turkey in Yatağan, Muğla Province in the south-west of the country. Currently owned by Aydem Enerji it has a 120m chimney. Yatağan thermal power plant consumes 5.4 million tons of coal from mines such as Turgut and can produce 3,780 GWh annually, the least productive power station in Turkey. The area is a sulfur dioxide air pollution hotspot and as of 2017 the air pollution caused by Yatağan and neighboring Kemerköy power station and Yeniköy power station is estimated to have caused 45,000 premature deaths. It is estimated that closing the plant by 2030, instead of when its licence ends in 2063, would prevent over 9000 premature deaths. Two workers were killed in 2018 and the plant's safety has been criticized by the Chamber of Engineers.

In 2018 the plant received 70 million lira capacity payments, and 94 million lira in 2019. In 2019 local people protested against 48 villages being destroyed by expansion of the mine feeding the plant. Opponents of the coal mining also claim it threatens the ancient city of Lagina. İklim Değişikliği Politika ve Araştırma Derneği (Climate Change Policy and Research Association) said that the plant was given a 5 year licence despite not having rehabilitated former ash storage landfill. In 2024 the ECHR again asked why the plant had been given a temporary operating permit. The Chamber of Engineers said in 2026 that if the plant was closed it would not cause a shortage of electricity either nationally or regionally.
