= Tunçbilek coal mine =

Coal mine in Turkey

Tunçbilek coal mine is a coal mine in Turkey, one of the largest. It supplies Tunçbilek power station.
