= Yaziji =

Yaziji, alternatively Yazigi or Yazji (Arabic: يازجي [jɑzɪdʒiː], Yāzijī) is an Arabic surname of Turkish origin, meaning 'clerk' or 'writer'. The Arabic definite article "Al-" is often added to render it Al-Yaziji or Al-Yazigi.

The Turkish equivalent is Yazıcı ([jazɯdʒɯ])

Yaziji/Yazigi/Yazji may refer to:

- Ibrahim al-Yaziji, Lebanese philologist
- John X (Yazigi) of Antioch (born 1955), Patriarch of Antioch
- Nasif al-Yaziji, Lebanese author
- Zeina Yazigi, Syrian journalist

== See also ==
- Yazici
