= Cenal power station =

Coal fired power station in Turkey

- Country: Turkey
- Coordinates: 40°25′12″N 27°19′10″E
- Status: Operational
- Commission date: 2017
- Owners: Alarko Holding; Cengiz Holding

Thermal power station
- Primary fuel: Bituminous coal
- Cooling source: Seawater

Power generation
- Nameplate capacity: 1,320 MW
- Annual net output: 10,221 GWh (2020); 10,675 GWh (2022); 9,167 GWh (2019); 9,774 GWh (2021)

Cenal power station is a 1320-megawatt coal-fired power station in Turkey in Çanakkale Province, which burns imported and local coal. The plant was financed by Turkish banks and is owned by Cengiz Holding and Alarko Holding and receives capacity payments. Environmentalists, such as Greenpeace, attempted to stop construction with protests, and legal action against the environmental impact assessments. Cenal is on the Global Coal Exit List. It is estimated that closing the plant by 2030, instead of when its licence ends in 2062, would prevent over 4000 premature deaths. A proposed expansion has been criticised as inconsistent with Turkeys hosting of COP31.
