= Anadolu Birlik Holding =

Turkish holding company

- Website: abholding.com.tr/en

Anadolu Birlik Holding is a conglomerate headquartered in Turkey with companies in agriculture, food and tourism. It owns coal-fired power stations in Turkey such as the Çoban Yıldızı power stations and is on the Urgewald global coal exit list.

In 2021, some assets were sold to pay down debts.
