= Diler Holding =

Turkish holding company

- Industry: Conglomerate
- Founded: 1949
- Founder: Mustafa Yazici
- Headquarters: Istanbul, Turkey
- Area served: Turkey
- Products: energy, steel, ports, banking, tourism
- Subsidiaries: List: Atlas Energy Diler Demir Çelik
- Website: dilerhld.com

Diler Holding, is a conglomerate, founded by Mustafa Yazıcı in 1949, in Turkey with businesses in iron and steel, energy, ports, banking, and tourism. Due to its large coal-fired power station in Turkey it is a large private sector greenhouse gas emitter in Turkey.

== Operations ==
Diler Holding activities involve iron and steel manufacturing, energy production, port operations, banking, and tourism. It owns the Cornelia Deluxe Resort and Cornelia Diamond Golf Resort and Spa, both in Antalya. Its subsidiary Atlas Enerji Üretim A.Ş. owns the 1,200 MW coal-fired Atlas İskenderun power station in Hatay Province and is on the Global Coal Exit List compiled by the NGO Urgewald. Climate Trace estimates the coal-fired power plant emitted over 1% of the country’s greenhouse gas in 2021.
