= Çumra =

- District and municipality
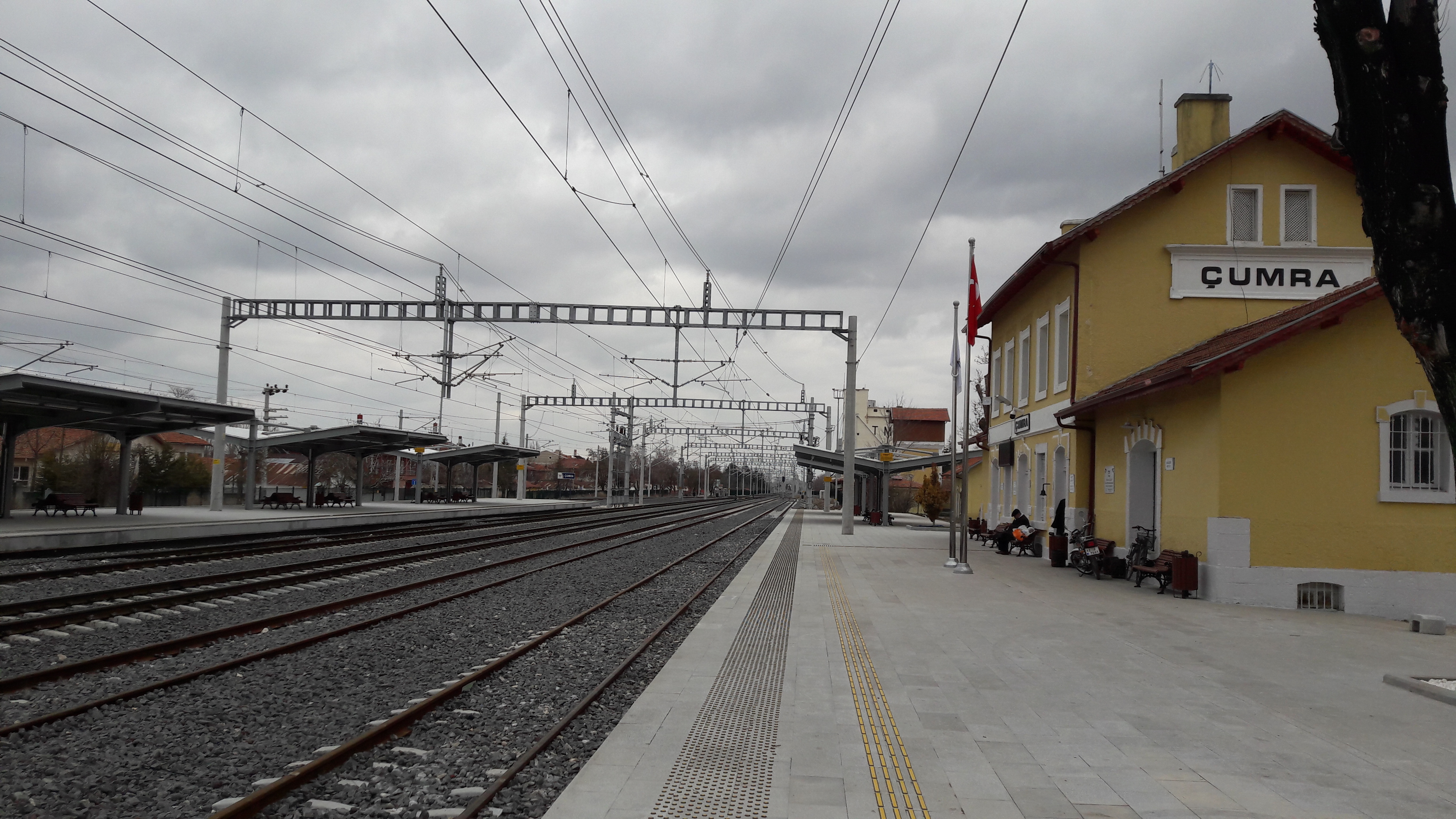
- Çumra railway station

- Logo

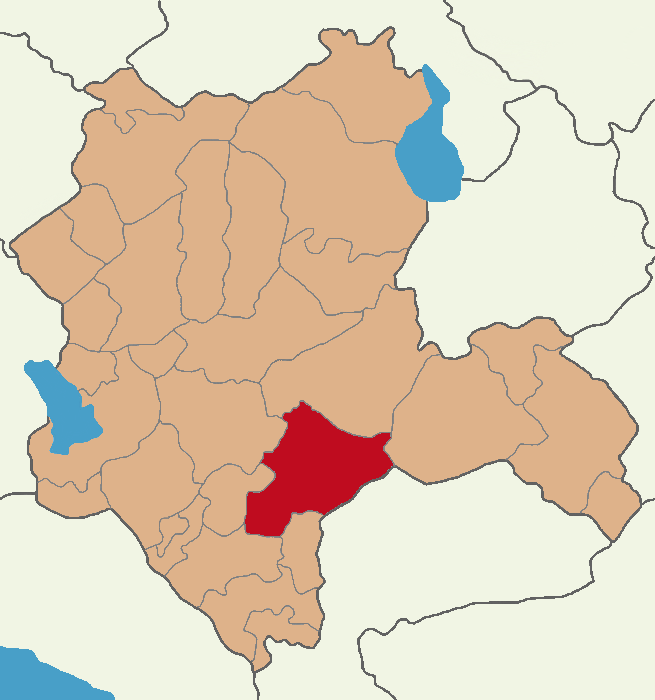
- Map showing Çumra District in Konya Province

- Location within Turkey Location within Turkey Central Anatolia
- Coordinates: 37°34′30″N 32°46′29″E
- Country: Turkey
- Province: Konya

Government
  - Mayor: Mehmet Aydin (Independent)
- Area: 2,089 km^{2} (807 sq mi)
- Elevation: 1,020 m (3,350 ft)
- Population (2022): 67,690
  - Density: 32.40/km^{2} (83.92/sq mi)
- Time zone: UTC+3 (TRT)
- Area code: 0332
- Climate: BSk
- Website: www.cumra.bel.tr

Çumra is a municipality and district of Konya Province, Turkey. Its area is 2,089 km^{2}, and its population is 67,690 (2022).

== Geography ==
The town of Çumra is at an altitude of 1,020 m. It is an important stop on the Istanbul to Baghdad railway. It is central to the 500 km²/120,000 acre Çumra irrigation zone, in the Konya Plain, that was established in 1912.

=== Climate ===
Çumra's climate is classified as cold semi-arid (Köppen: BSk). The town experiences hot, dry summers and chilly, frequently snowy winters.

Climate data for Çumra (1991–2020)
Month	Jan	Feb	Mar	Apr	May	Jun	Jul	Aug	Sep	Oct	Nov	Dec	Year
Mean daily maximum °C (°F)	5.4 (41.7)	7.8 (46.0)	13.3 (55.9)	18.5 (65.3)	23.5 (74.3)	27.9 (82.2)	31.2 (88.2)	31.2 (88.2)	27.3 (81.1)	21.1 (70.0)	13.5 (56.3)	7.3 (45.1)	19.1 (66.4)
Daily mean °C (°F)	0.3 (32.5)	1.8 (35.2)	6.5 (43.7)	11.4 (52.5)	16.2 (61.2)	20.3 (68.5)	23.5 (74.3)	23.2 (73.8)	18.9 (66.0)	13.2 (55.8)	6.5 (43.7)	2.1 (35.8)	12.0 (53.6)
Mean daily minimum °C (°F)	−3.8 (25.2)	−3.1 (26.4)	0.4 (32.7)	4.7 (40.5)	9.0 (48.2)	12.8 (55.0)	15.5 (59.9)	15.3 (59.5)	10.9 (51.6)	6.3 (43.3)	0.9 (33.6)	−1.9 (28.6)	5.6 (42.1)
Average precipitation mm (inches)	38.73 (1.52)	26.29 (1.04)	30.36 (1.20)	35.69 (1.41)	31.87 (1.25)	24.34 (0.96)	5.37 (0.21)	3.43 (0.14)	11.64 (0.46)	24.12 (0.95)	35.04 (1.38)	48.67 (1.92)	315.55 (12.42)
Average precipitation days (≥ 1.0 mm)	6.0	5.1	5.3	5.5	5.4	4.0	1.6	1.6	2.6	4.4	4.4	7.1	53.0
Average relative humidity (%)	76.5	70.8	60.7	56.3	54.5	50.4	44.4	45.7	49.1	60.0	69.1	76.7	59.5
Source: NOAA

== History ==
Neolithic (c. 8000 BC) archaeological discoveries have been found at Çatalhöyük.

In the 12th century the Konya plain experienced its second great cultural period, when the city became the capital of the Seljuk Turks.

=== Archaeological findings ===
In 2019, a farmer near the site of Türkmen-Karahöyük, a Bronze and Iron Age mounded settlement discovered a stone stele commissioned by Hartapu to commemorate his victory over Phrygia written in Luwian Hieroglyphics. Archaeologists from the University of Chicago joined the Konya Regional Archaeological Survey Project to excavate the stele, and the excavations of the archaeological mound at the site, which is believed to be the capital of Hartapu's as yet unnamed kingdom, will continue in 2020. In February 2020, archaeologists announced the discovery of Luwian hieroglyphs on the stone stele pulled out of the irrigation ditch next to the ancient mound of Türkmen-Karahöyük, describing the military victory of "Great King Hartapu" over an alliance of 13 kings. The description has a reference to defeating the royal house of Phrygia, which included King Midas.

== Composition ==
There are 53 neighbourhoods in Çumra District:

- Abditolu
- Adakale
- Afşar
- Alemdar
- Alibeyhüyüğü
- Alıssa
- Apa
- Apasaraycık
- Arıkören
- Avdul
- Bağlar
- Bakkalbaşı
- Balçıkhisar
- Baraj
- Bardakcı
- Beylerce
- Büyükaşlama
- Çaybaşı
- Çiçek
- Çukurkavak
- Cumhuriyet
- Dedemoğlu
- Dinek
- Dineksaray
- Dinlendik
- Doğanlı
- Erentepe
- Fethiye
- Gökhüyük
- Güvercinlik
- Hürriyet
- İçeriçumra
- İnli
- İstiklal
- İzzetbey
- Karkın
- Küçükköy
- Kuzucu
- Meydan
- Okçu
- Seçme
- Sürgüç
- Tahtalı
- Taşağıl
- Türkmencamili
- Türkmenkarahüyük
- Üçhüyük
- Ürünlü
- Uzunkuyu
- Yenidoğan
- Yenimahalle
- Yenisu
- Yörükcamili

== Industry ==
Konya Şeker has a sugar factory with a small coal-fired autoproducer power plant, one of the Çoban Yıldızı power stations.
