= Kipaş Holding =

Turkish holding company

- Website: www.kipas.com.tr

Kipaş Holding is a holding company headquartered in Turkey with interests in energy, textiles, and others. In 2023 the business suffered from the earthquake in Karamanmaraş.

It owns a small coal-fired power station in Turkey (licences EÜ/4969-259/2959 and EÜ/10947-1/05159).
