= Akbelen Forest =

Woodland in Turkey

- Location within Turkey

Geography
- Location: İkizköy, Muğla Province, Turkey
- Coordinates: 37°10′39″N 27°51′13″E
- Area: 740 hectares (1,800 acres)

Akbelen Forest (Turkish: Akbelen Ormanı) is a woodland in the Muğla Province of Turkey, located near İkizköy village.

In July 2023, most of the forest was cut down by YK Energy to make way for expansion of İkizköy lignite mine, which supplies the nearby Yeniköy power station. The deforestation attracted protests in July 2023. The protests were met with a police response and national media attention. 60 percent of the forest had been destroyed by August.

A presidential decree to expropriate over 2000 hectares of land for mining was granted in March 2024, but cancelled the same month.

In July 2025 the government proposed that mining companies will not have to wait for EIA approval from the ministry before extending the mine. As of May 2026 a case continues in the Constitutional Court.

== The forest ==
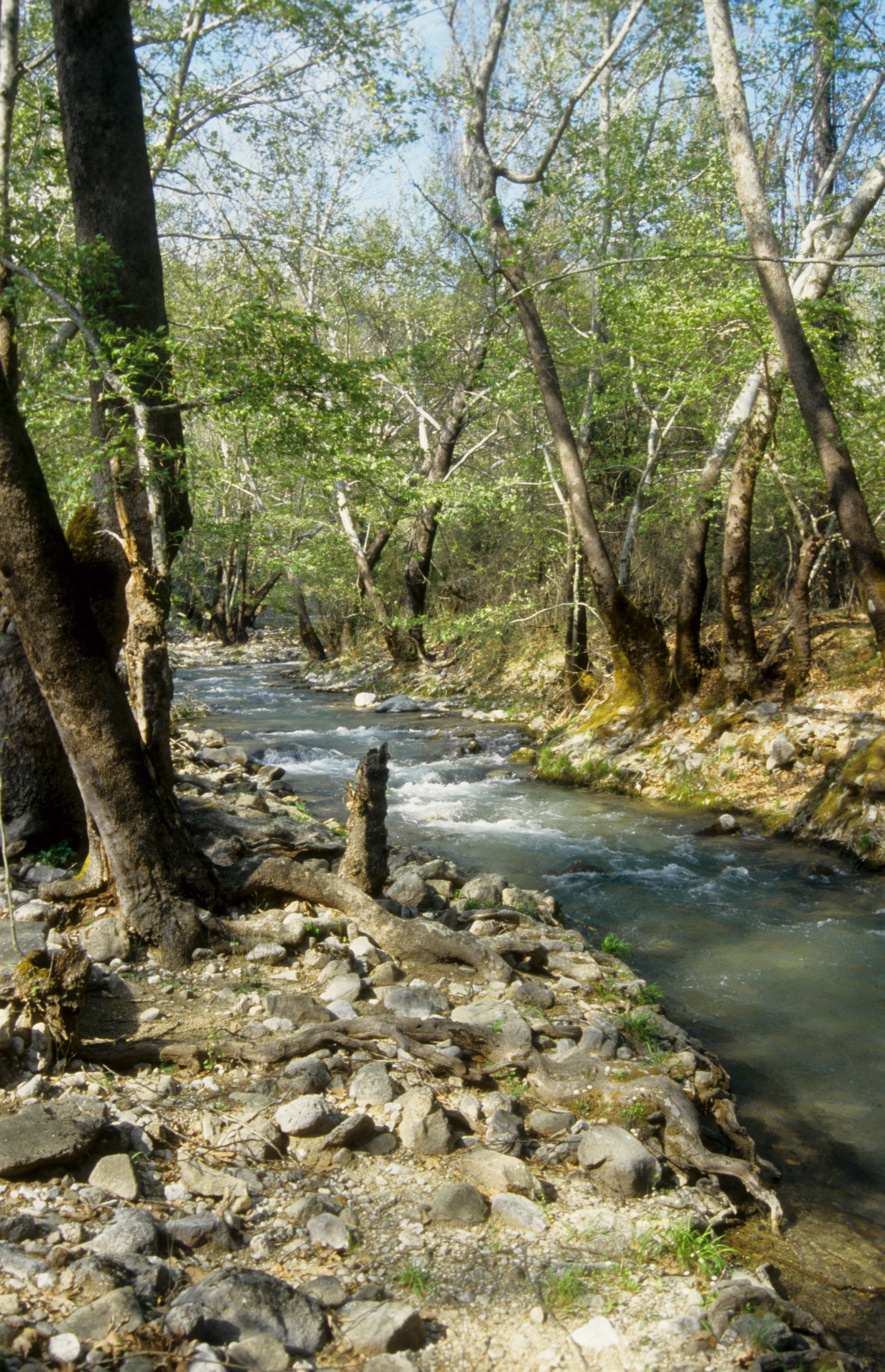
View of forests in the area in 1997

The forest covers 740 hectares (1,800 acres) and is home to various tree species, such as Turkish pine, oak, alder, chestnut and sycamore.

It is located near the village of İkizköy, Muğla Province where the government-linked YK Energy operates an opencast coal mine (one of the Yeniköy lignite mines) and the Yeniköy and Kemerköy coal-fired power plants, two of the oldest coal-fired power plants in Turkey.

== Protests and responses ==
Local women led their communities in protests against the planned deforestation beginning in 2019. Deforestation by YK Energy began on July 24, 2023. On July 27, local activists reported that the forest was three days away from being completely destroyed. The deforestation was completed on July 31. Although many Turkish pines were cut down, conservation organization Doğa Derneği said that the maquis and the soil should be left undisturbed so that the forest could regenerate itself.

The protests garnered national attention in July 2023, as opposition leader Kemal Kılıçdaroğlu joined the protestors. Protestors were met with armoured vehicles, tear gas, and water cannons. Forty people were detained or arrested. Two journalists reporting on the deforestation were fined, and one was detained and accused of "trespassing." The main opposition Republican People's Party wanted a debate in parliament, but it did not take place as government MPs prorogued. Some academics also said the mine expansion should be cancelled, for example Hacettepe University Department of Biology Prof. Dr. Utku Perktaş said that trees are important to help prevent climate change in Turkey.

Yeniköy and Kemerköy power plants supply most of the electricity in the South Aegean part of the country. (Note: 9,489 GWh was consumed in 2022: Kemerköy 4,128 gigawatt hour (2019), 3,504 gigawatt hour (2020), 3,518 gigawatt hour (2021), 4,846 gigawatt hour (2022) Yeniköy 2,997 gigawatt hour (2019), 3,234 gigawatt hour (2020), 3,278 gigawatt hour (2021), 3,094 gigawatt hour (2022)) YK Energy said in a press release that most of the more than 3,000 employees were recruited locally. Their press release also said that the power stations provide baseload power that could not be replaced by renewable energy. The company's press release also stated that the forest is not a conservation zone, that they will restore the ecosystem once mining is complete, and that the company has planted millions of trees countrywide. According to the Muğla Govenorate 130,000 saplings will be planted to rehabilitate the area. Political scientist Elif Shafak has noted that 90% of trees planted by previous government-sponsored initiatives have died.

Environmental activist and community leader Nejla Işık led protests, legal actions, and on-site watches beginning in 2019 to oppose coal mining in the Akbelen Forest and was elected İkizköy’s mukhtar on March 31, 2024, continuing her advocacy despite resistance from authorities and mining companies. In March 2026, her daughter Esra Işık was arrested after protesting a state official's visit to the forest.

In August 2023, environmental engineer Deniz Gümüşel stated that sixty percent of the forest was destroyed; gendarmes remained stationed in the area. As there is a clause in the constitution saying that the environment should be protected, a volunteer lawyer for the inhabitants of İkizköy has alleged that the gendarmerie acted unconstitutionally by stopping the protesters from protecting the environment. President Recep Tayyip Erdoğan dismissed the protestors as "environmentalist-looking marginals" on August 7.

On September 1, 2023, anti-deforestation protestors released a press statement condemning the ongoing deforestation.

In March 2024 the presidential decree to expropriate over 2000 hectares of land for mining was granted then cancelled two days later. However in July 2025 the government proposed that mining companies would not have to wait for EIA approval from the ministry before extending the mine. In May 2026 the Council of State rejected that for some of the land, but a case in the Constitutional Court was continuing.

== See also ==
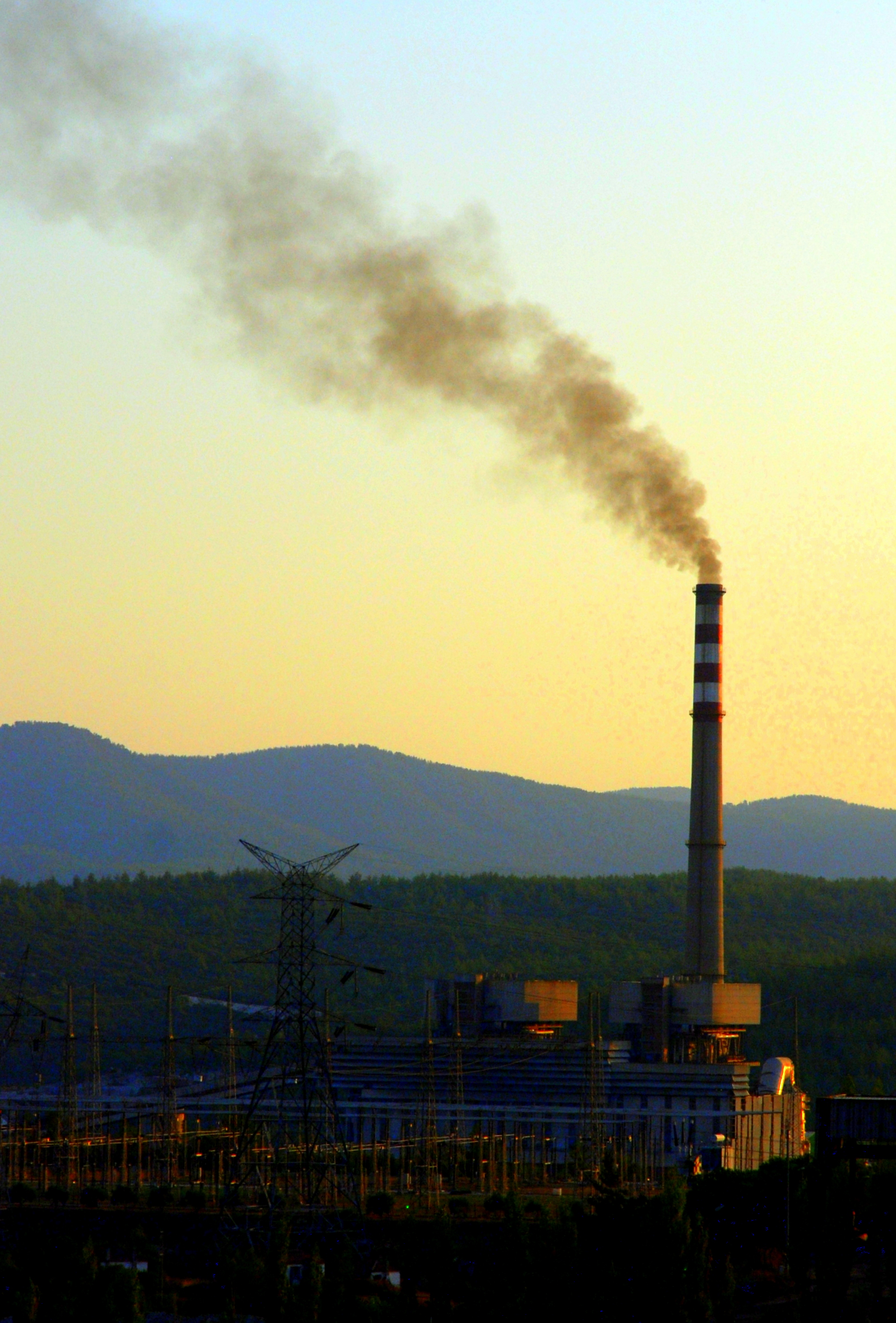
Yeniköy Power Plant

- Cerattepe
- Coal in Turkey
- Forest in Turkey
- Hambach Forest forest in Germany saved from lignite mining
- Kuznetsk Basin part of Russia where forest is being cut to make way for coal mines
- Gezi Park protests 2013 unrest in Turkey that several sources have compared to the Akbelen protests.
