= ZETES power stations =

Coal fired power station in Turkey

Coordinates: 41°30′58″N 31°54′11″E

The Zonguldak Eren Termik Santrali (ZETES) power stations in Zonguldak are 3 coal-fired power stations in Turkey totaling 2790 MW owned by Eren Holding via Eren Enerji.

Built between 2010 and 2016, ZETES-1 is 160 MW, ZETES-2 is 1230 MW and ZETES-3 is 1400 MW. Together they are the largest installed capacity coal-fired power stations in Turkey and are estimated by Climate Trace to emit over 15 million tons (Mt) CO_{2} per year, over 2% of Turkey's greenhouse gas emissions. Located within about a kilometer of each other and the Black Sea the plants burn bituminous coal imported via the nearby Eren Port. ZETES-3 was financed by IşBank and Garanti Bank.

The plants received 13 million lira capacity payments in 2018, and 10 million lira in 2019. In 2022 the plants generated over 16 TWh of electricity. The emission factor was estimated at 870g CO2eq per KWh in 2020.

Their licences end in 2053. For ZETES-1 it is estimated that closing the plant by 2030, instead of when its licence ends, would prevent over 1000 premature deaths. For ZETES-2 it is estimated that closing the plant by 2030, instead of when its licence ends, would prevent over 4000 premature deaths. For ZETES-3 it is estimated that closing the plant by 2030, instead of when its licence ends, would prevent over 5000 premature deaths.
