= Çayırhan power station =

Coal fired power station in Turkey

- Country: Turkey
- Coordinates: 40°05′49″N 31°41′42″E
- Status: Operational
- Commission date: 1987

Thermal power station
- Primary fuel: Lignite

Power generation
- Nameplate capacity: 620 MW
- Annual net output: 1,935 GWh (2021); 2,353 GWh (2022); 2,893 GWh (2020); 4,312 GWh (2019)

Çayırhan power station is a 620 MW operational coal fired power station in Turkey in Ankara Province. In 2019 land was expropriated for another lignite mine, to feed the a proposed extension, which was opposed as uneconomic and eventually had its licence revoked.

== History ==
In 2017 the government privatized the Çayırhan-B lignite coalfield on condition a coal-fired power plant is built, in the hope that it would be the first of a wave of similar deals for various lignite coalfields around the country.

== Ownership ==
The project was a joint venture between Kolin, Kalyon and Çelikler. But in 2020 the licence expired and as of 2024 it belonged to EÜAŞ. In 2025 it was sold to Akçadağ Holding for 20 billion lira.

== Finance ==
An extension was proposed at an estimated cost of $1.1-billion but was not done.

=== Subsidies ===
The government is giving a 15-year purchase guarantee.

== Economics ==
The winning consortium bid $60.4 per megawatt, but according to opponents of the extension expanding Turkey's solar power would save taxpayers money in the long term.

== Employment ==
The company said it would employ 500 people in the plant and 1,500 for coal mining.

== Coal supply ==
As Turkish lignite is heavy compared to its energy content coal must be sourced locally. According to one source Çayırhan is a longwall mine (therefore underground), but Global Energy Monitor says it is opencast. Coalfields in Ankara province include Beypazarı-Çayırhan, Gölbaşı-Karagedik, Gölbaşı-Bahçeköy, Ayaş-Kayıbucak and Şereflikoçhisar.

== Environmental Impact ==
Despite the environmental impact assessment having been approved opponents of the extension claim the environment will be damaged.

=== Dust ===
As of 2020 the plant is operating with inadequate dust filters and Turkey has no legal limit on ambient fine particules (PM2.5). Opponents claim that Nallıhan bird sanctuary, 6 km away, could be damaged.

=== Sulfur Dioxide ===
As of 2020 the plant is operating with inadequate sulfur treatment, and the area is a sulfur dioxide air pollution hotspot

=== Nitrogen oxides ===
As of 2020 the plant is operating without sufficient NOx filtering.

=== Greenhouse gases ===
After extension the power station would contribute an estimated 4 megatonnes (Mt) a year to Turkey's greenhouse gas emissions. As Turkey has no carbon emission trading it would not be economically viable to capture and store the gas.

== Opposition ==
The Chamber of Mechanical Engineers has questioned why the existing plant was granted a 2020 operating license without meeting air pollution standards. Opponents include Ankara 350.org and singer Tarkan.

In 2022 the NGO Climate Change, Policy, and Research Association alleged that the power station did not comply with flue gas regulations, was burning coal from a mine which did not have a permit, and risked collapsing.

== See also ==
- Energy in Turkey
- List of power stations in Turkey
- Electricity sector in Turkey
