= Fırat Çeçen =

Turkish businessperson (born 1972)

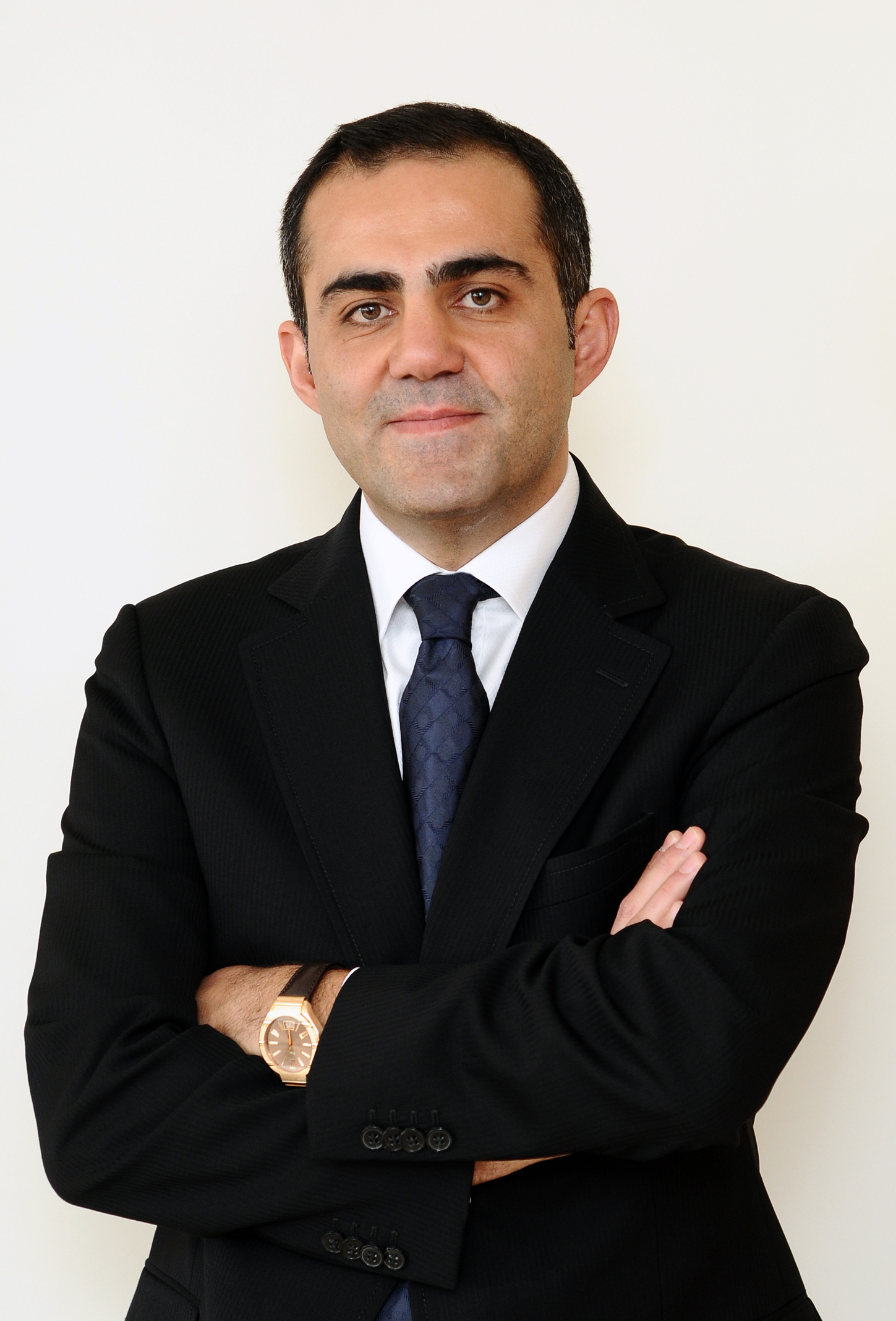
Fırat Çeçen, Chairman of the Board of Directors at IC İçtaş Sanayi ve Ticaret A.S

Fırat Çeçen (born 1972 in Ankara) is a Turkish businessperson who takes multiple roles as a member of the board at IC İçtaş Holding. He is a Chairman of the Board of Directors at IC İçtaş Sanayi ve Ticaret A.S and a member of the Board of Directors at IC İbrahim Çeçen Yatırım Holding A.S. Çeçen graduated from Middle East Technical University, Turkey in 1994 where he completed his bachelor's degree in Construction Engineering.

After the graduation, he took a position as the Project Manager Assistant at IC Holding. From there, he went up to General Manager, Member of the Board of Directors, and Chairman of IC İçtaş Construction Board of Directors in this order.

He is also a member of TED University in Ankara, where he conducts his academic activities.

He worked on multiple international projects in Turkey as well as Russia, the United States, Middle East, Middle Asia and Europe. He specialized in PPP projects that include complicated industrial, infrastructure and superstructure constructions. Along with the projects, they also support sustainability projects such as Green Business Summit, which was sponsored by the Holding.
