= Atlas power station =

Coal fired power station in Turkey

- Country: Turkey
- Coordinates: 36°41′25″N 36°12′33″E
- Status: Operational
- Commission date: 2014
- Owner: Diler Holding

Thermal power station
- Primary fuel: Anthracite

Power generation
- Nameplate capacity: 1,200 MW
- Annual net output: 7,966 GWh (2021); 8,502 GWh (2019); 8,583 GWh (2020); 8,687 GWh (2022)

Atlas power station or Atlas Enerji İskenderun power station is a 1200-megawatt coal-fired power station in Turkey in İskenderun in Hatay Province, which burns imported and local coal and receives capacity payments. Construction was financed by Garanti Bank, Akbank and Işbank.

It is estimated that closing the plant by 2030, instead of when its licence ends in 2057, would prevent over 5000 premature deaths.

Climate Trace estimates the power station emitted over 5 million tons of the total 730 million tons of greenhouse gas emissions by Turkey in 2022. So its owner Atlas Energy (itself owned by Diler Holding) is on the Urgewald Global Coal Exit List.
