= Gulf of Alexandretta =

Gulf of the eastern Mediterranean or Levantine Sea

Coordinates: 36°45′N 36°00′E

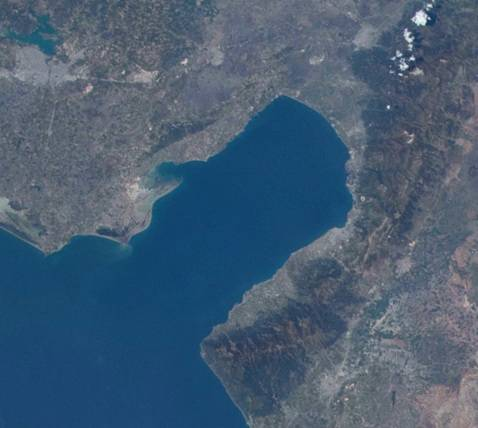
The Gulf of Alexandretta photographed from the ISS in April 2018

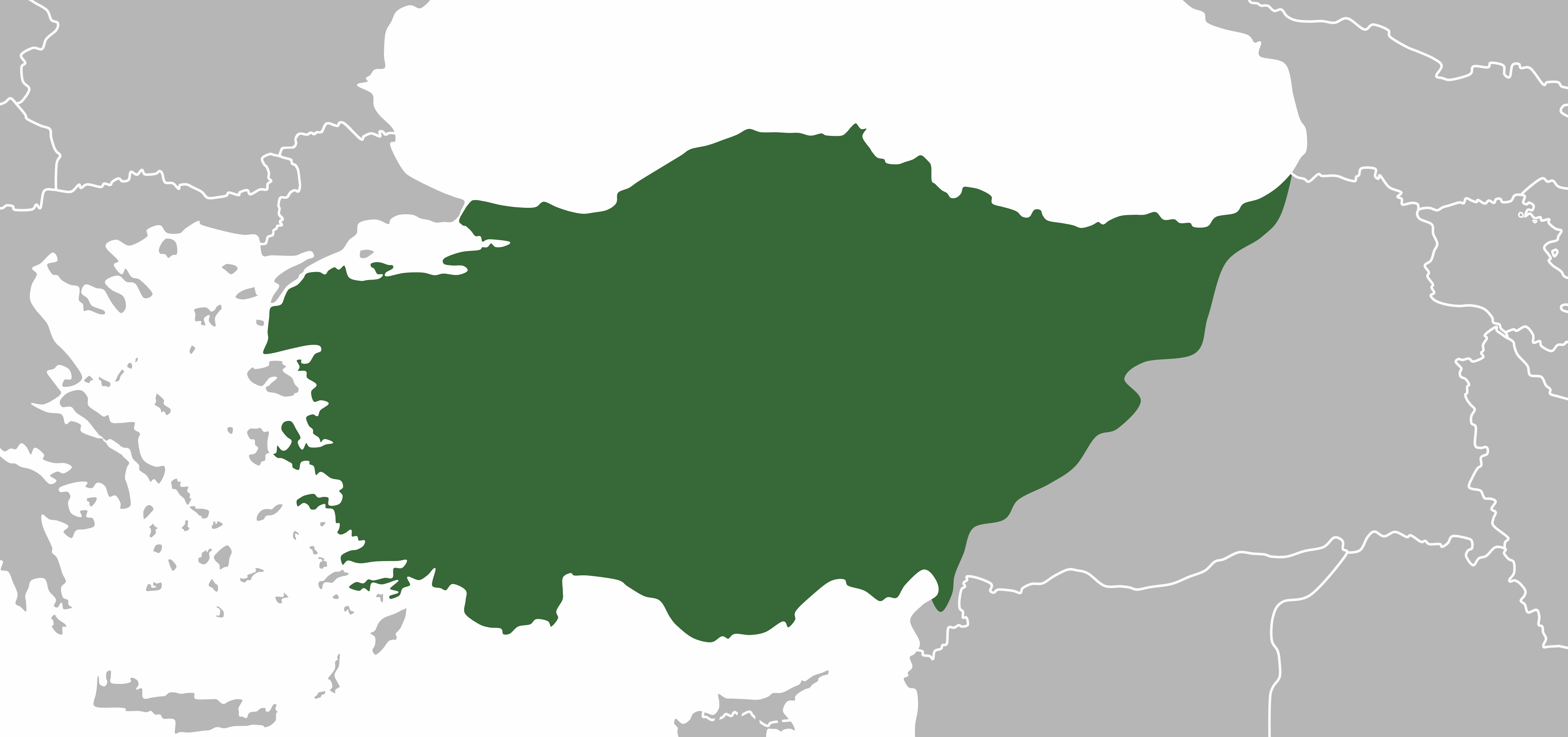
Map of Anatolia (dark green) as sometimes defined, with the Gulf of Alexandretta at its southeastern extremity

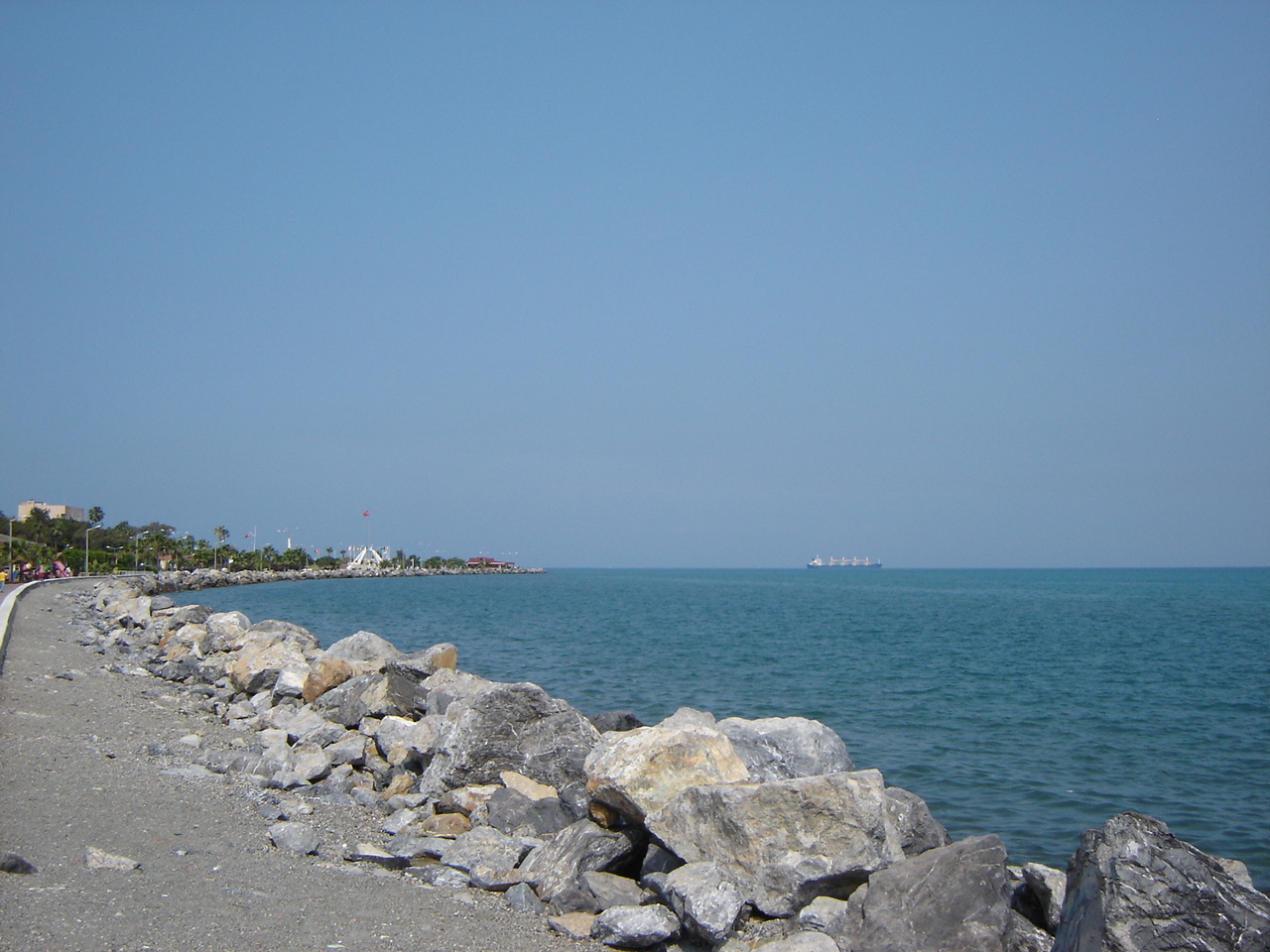
The Gulf at Iskenderun (Alexandretta)

The Gulf of Alexandretta or İskenderun (Turkish: İskenderun Körfezi) is a gulf of the eastern Mediterranean or Levantine Sea. It lies beside the southern Turkish provinces of Adana and Hatay.

== Names ==
The gulf is named for the nearby Turkish city of İskenderun, the classical Alexandretta. It was also formerly known as the Sea or the Gulf of Issus (Latin: Mare Issicum or Issicus Sinus, Ancient Greek: Ἰσσικὸς κόλπος), named for the ancient city there. Herodotus and Stephanus of Byzantium also records it as the Marandynian/Myriandinian Bay (Ancient Greek: Μυριανδικὸς κόλπος), after the nearby town of Myriandus. Between the 9th and 12th centuries, the gulf was known as the Armenian Gulf or the Armenian Bay (Armenian: Հայկական ծոց) due to the Armenian presence and eventually statehood in Cilicia.

== Geography ==
The Gulf of Alexandretta forms the easternmost bay or inlet of the Mediterranean Sea. It lies beside the southern coast of Turkey, near its border with Syria. In antiquity, the adjacent Nur Mountains were usually thought to separate the regions of Cilicia and Syria, although Herodotus at one point places the division further south at Ras al-Bassit (the classical Posidium).

== Pollution ==
There is a lot of heavy industry around Iskenderun Bay, including five cement factories, ten steel factories, and three coal-fired power stations: İsken Sugözü, Atlas and Emba Hunutlu. The mountains around the bay trap air pollution, but because smokestack details are sent to the government unpublished, it is difficult to apportion responsibility for deaths and illnesses caused by air pollution in the area. The water too is polluted by land-based, shipping and fish farming activities.

== See also ==
- Çukurova, the modern equivalent to Cilicia
- List of gulfs
