= Seyitömer power station =

Coal fired power station in Turkey

- Country: Turkey
- Coordinates: 39°34′27″N 29°52′56″E
- Status: Operational
- Commission date: 1973
- Owner: Çelikler Holding

Thermal power station
- Primary fuel: Lignite

Power generation
- Nameplate capacity: 600 MW
- Annual net output: 1,461 GWh (2020); 3,359 GWh (2022); 3,769 GWh (2021); 3,968 GWh (2019)

Seyitömer power station is a 600-megawatt coal-fired power station in Turkey near Seyitömer, Kütahya Province, built in the late 20th century, which burns lignite mined locally.

The four units were started in 1973, 1974, 1977 and 1989.

The plant is owned by Çelikler Holding and in 2018 received 67 million lira capacity payments. The area is a sulfur dioxide air pollution hotspot. In January 2020 the plant was shut down for failing to meet new pollution limits: however three out of four units were upgraded and restarted later in 2020. According to İklim Değişikliği Politika ve Araştırma Derneği (Climate Change Policy and Research Association) in 2021 the plant discharged waste without a licence and without penalty. It is estimated that closing the plant by 2030, instead of when its licence ends in 2062, would prevent over 4000 premature deaths.
