= Soma A power station =

Coal fired power station in Turkey

- Country: Turkey
- Coordinates: 39.1936°N 27.6303°E
- Status: Operational
- Commission date: 1957
- Owner: Electricity Generation Company

Thermal power station
- Primary fuel: Lignite

Power generation
- Nameplate capacity: 44 MW
- Annual net output: 286 GWh

External links
- Website: www.euas.gov.tr/tr-TR/santraller/soma-a-termik-santrali

Soma A power station (formerly Soma power station) is a 44 MW coal-fired power station in Soma, Manisa in western Turkey. The station closed in 2010 but was reopened in 2012 for research and development by the state owned Electricity Generation Company. It has not yet been permanently closed despite pollution complaints.

== Coal ==
The power station burns lignite from the nearby Soma coal mine.
