= Tunçbilek power station =

Coal fired power station in Turkey

- Country: Turkey
- Coordinates: 39°37′41″N 29°27′45″E
- Status: Operational
- Commission date: 1956
- Owner: Çelikler Holding

Thermal power station
- Primary fuel: Lignite

Power generation
- Nameplate capacity: 365 MW
- Annual net output: 0 GWh (2021); 2 GWh (2020); 534 GWh (2022); 760 GWh (2019)

Tunçbilek power station (also known as Çelikler Tunçbilek power station) is a 365 MW coal-fired power station in Turkey in Kütahya built in the 1970s, which burns lignite from Tunçbilek coal mine. The plant is owned by Çelikler Holding and in 2018 received 41 million lira capacity payments. The area is a sulfur dioxide air pollution hotspot. According to İklim Değişikliği Politika ve Araştırma Derneği (Climate Change Policy and Research Association) in 2021 the plant operated without a licence for 11 days without penalty.

In 2022 it was operating on a temporary licence.

It is estimated that closing the plant by 2030, instead of when its licence ends in 2064, would prevent over 6000 premature deaths.
