= Deniş coal mine =

Mine in Turkey

Deniş Coal Mine
- Location: Manisa Province, Turkey
- Products: Lignite
- Company: TKİ

Deniş Coal Mine is a lignite mine located in the Manisa Province in Turkey and is owned by the state lignite company Turkish Coal Operations Authority. It is one of the Aegean (lignite) coal mines which emits the most greenhouse gas in Turkey among fossil fuel projects.
