= Bekirli power station =

Coal fired power station in Turkey

Bekirli-2
- Country: Turkey
- Coordinates: 40°23′58″N 27°02′59″E
- Status: Operational
- Commission date: 2011
- Owner: İÇDAŞ

Thermal power station
- Primary fuel: Bituminous coal

Power generation
- Nameplate capacity: 1,200 MW
- Annual net output: 7,208 GWh (2021); 7,855 GWh (2022); 8,544 GWh (2020); 8,658 GWh (2019)

Bekirli power station or İÇDAŞ Bekirli-2 power station or İÇDAŞ Biga-2 power station is a 2 unit 1200-megawatt coal-fired power station in Turkey in Çanakkale Province owned by İÇDAŞ, which burns imported and local coal and receives capacity payments. İşbank provided construction finance. Opponents say it is one of many polluting industries in the area.

It is estimated that closing the plant by 2030, instead of when its licence ends in 2056, would prevent over 5000 premature deaths.
