= Yeniköy power station =

Coal fired power station in Turkey

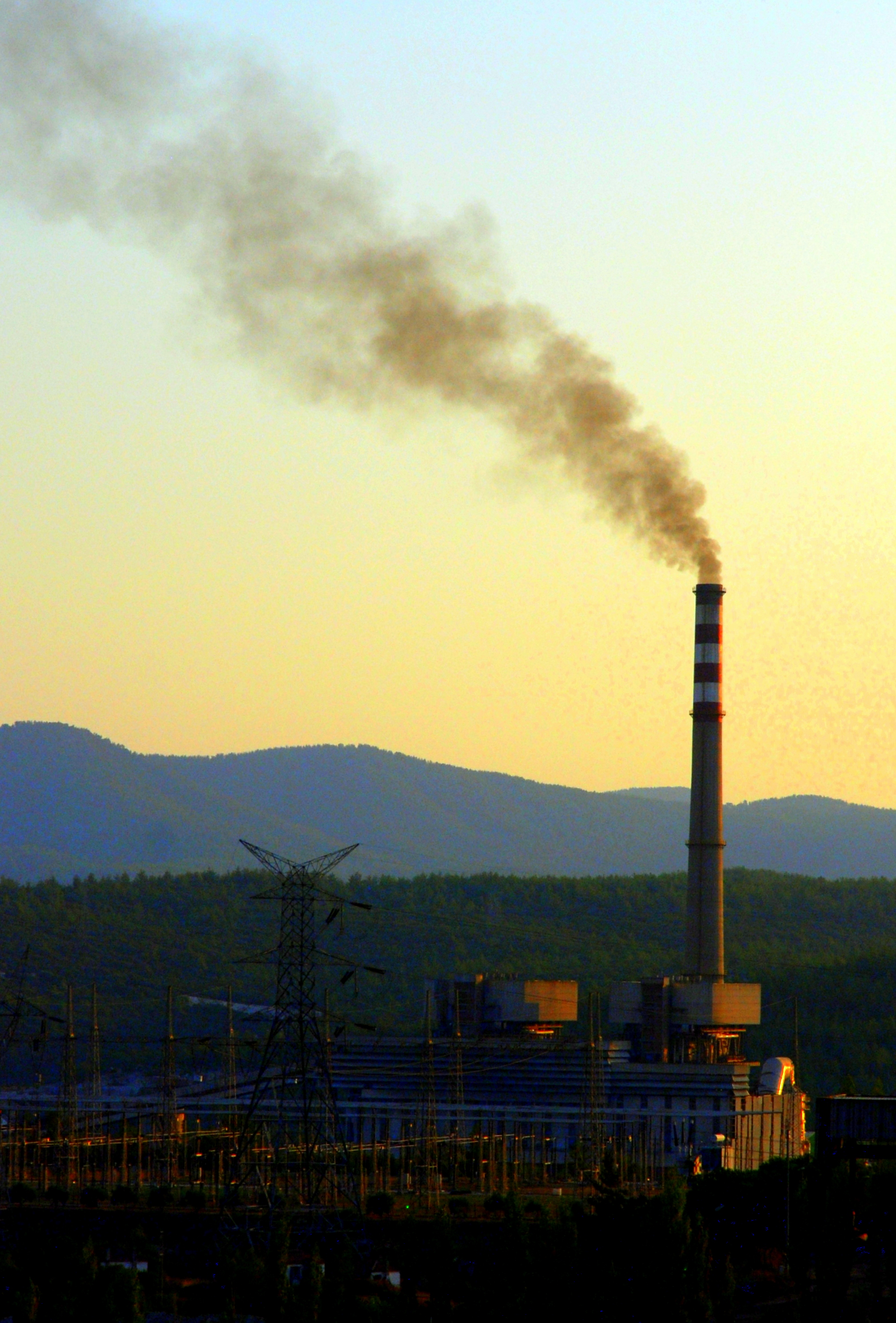
- Country: Turkey
- Coordinates: 37°08′28″N 27°52′22″E
- Status: Operational
- Commission date: 1986
- Owners: IC Holding; Limak Holding

Thermal power station
- Primary fuel: Lignite

Power generation
- Nameplate capacity: 420 MW
- Annual net output: 2,997 GWh (2019); 3,094 GWh (2022); 3,234 GWh (2020); 3,278 GWh (2021)

External links
- Commons: Related media on Commons

Yeniköy power station is a 420 MW coal-fired power station in Turkey in Yeniköy, Muğla built in the late 20th century, which burns lignite mined locally. The plant is owned by Limak- IC İçtaş and in 2020 it received 93 million lira ($16,000,000) capacity payments. The area is a sulfur dioxide air pollution hotspot and as of 2017 the air pollution caused by Yeniköy and neighboring Yatağan power station and Kemerköy power station is estimated to have caused 45,000 premature deaths. It is estimated that closing the plant by 2030, instead of when its licence ends in 2063, would prevent over 7000 premature deaths.

The chimney of the plant has a height of 200 metres .

In 2019 local people protested against 48 villages being destroyed by expansion of the mine feeding the plant. The company has been granted a permit to cut down Akbelen Forest to make way for the mine expansion, but in 2021 inhabitant of İkizköy village continue to protest and filed a lawsuit claiming that the permit should not have been granted without an environmental impact assessment. The company says that Akbelen was allocated to the coal mine when the power plant was built, and that the General Directorate of Forestry defined it as an “industrial plantation area for 2019”. In July 2025 the government legislated that mining companies will not have to wait for EIA approval from the ministry before extending the mine.

The plant was inspected by Istanbul Technical University in 2019 before new pollution regulations came into force at the beginning of 2020, and they made various improvement recommendations, such as better groundwater monitoring near the ash ponds. Despite improvements such as better flue gas filters not being completed on all units, the plant was allowed to operate on a temporary licence in 2020, and in January 2021 the plant was granted a second temporary operating licence with a requirement to submit an environmental report to the ministry in June. The company Yenikoy Kemerkoy Elektrik Uretim ve Ticaret AS is on the Global Coal Exit List compiled by the NGO Urgewald. The Chamber of Engineers said in 2026 that if the plant was closed it would not cause a shortage of electricity either nationally or regionally.
