= Orhaneli power station =

Coal-fired power station in Turkey

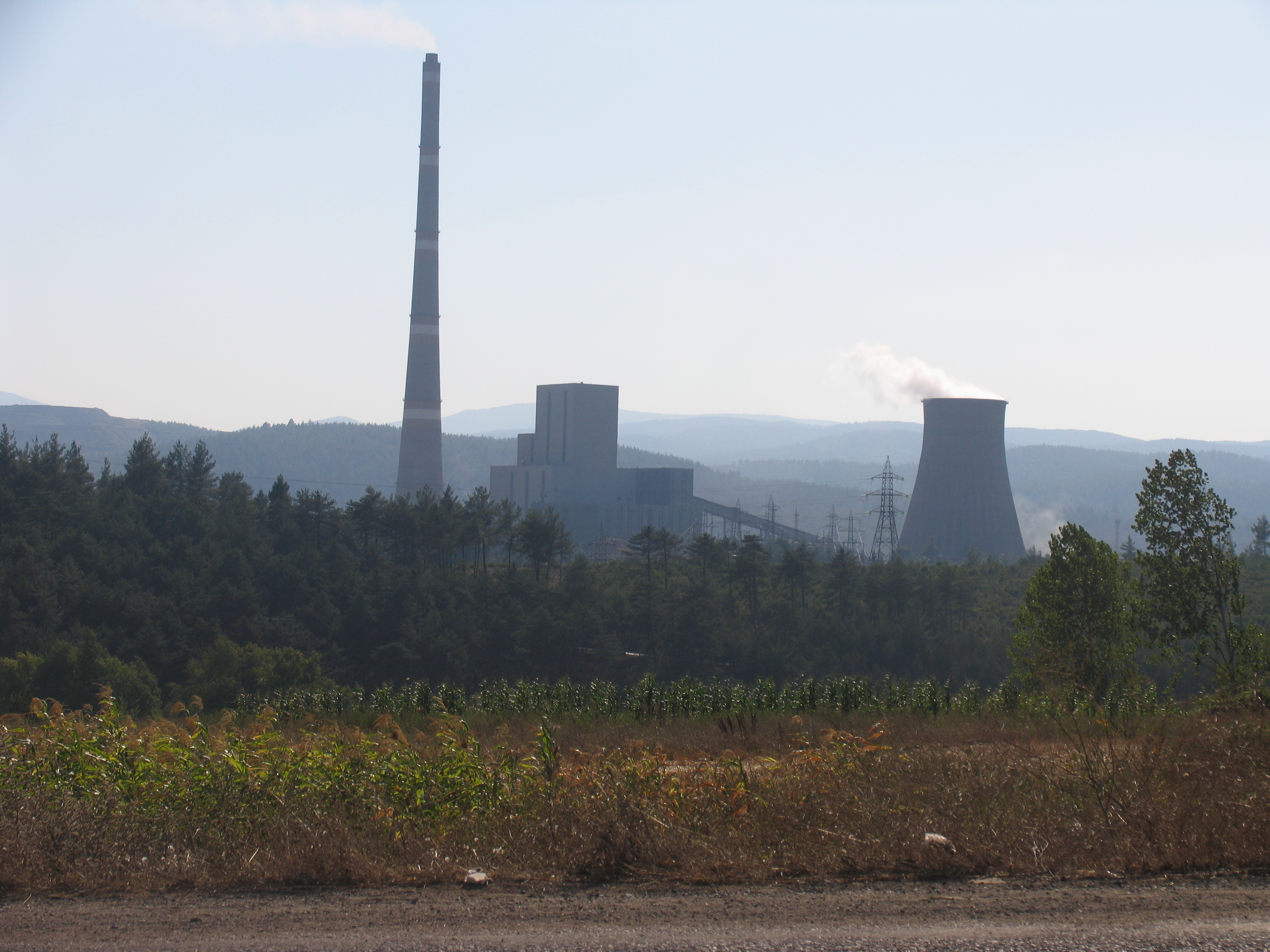
- Country: Turkey
- Coordinates: 39°57′05″N 28°52′15″E
- Status: Operational
- Commission date: 1992
- Owner: Çelikler Holding

Thermal power station
- Primary fuel: Lignite

Power generation
- Nameplate capacity: 210 MW
- Annual net output: 1,294 GWh (2021); 1,353 GWh (2020); 1,570 GWh (2019); 346 GWh (2022)

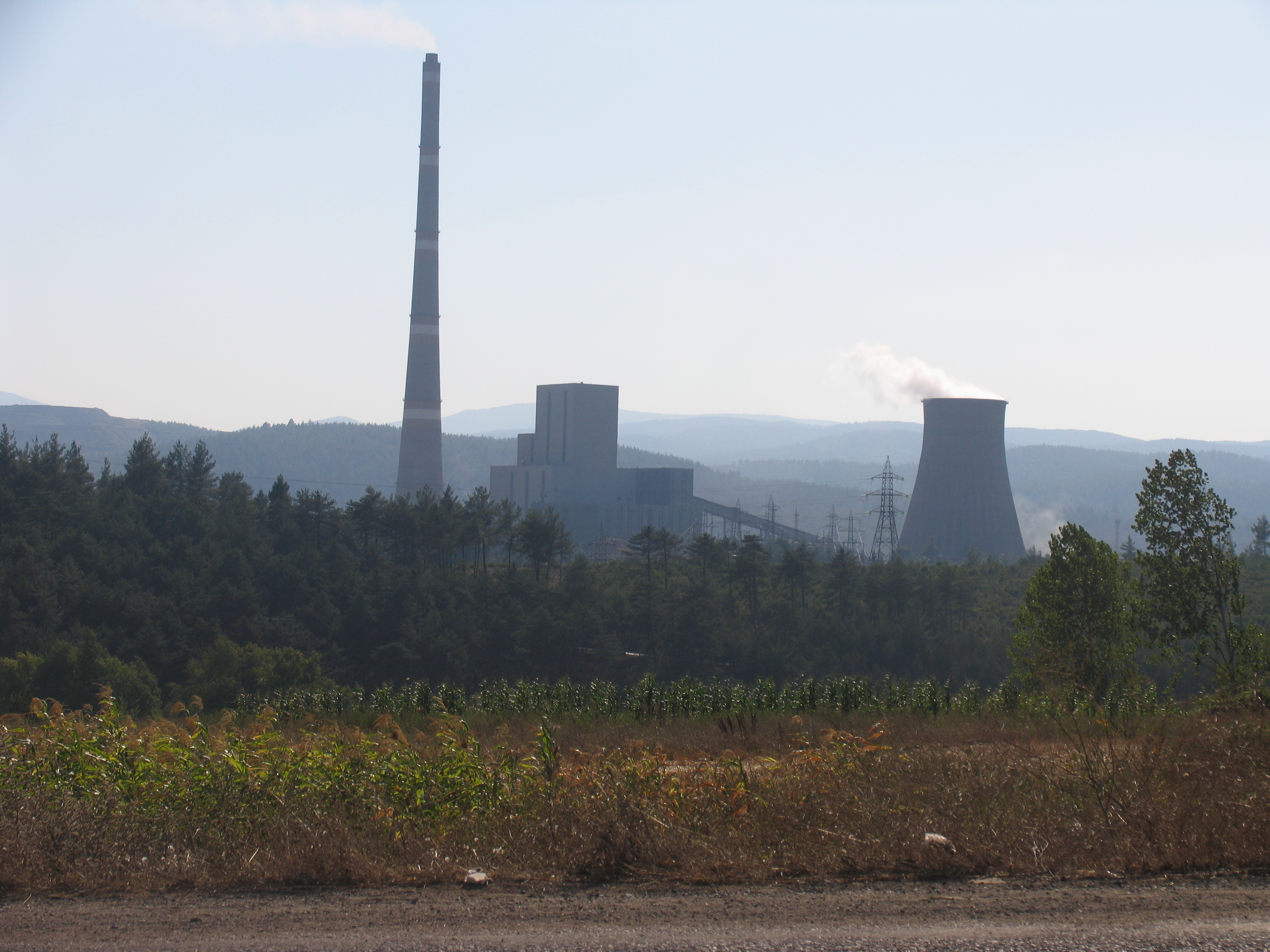
Orhaneli power station

Orhaneli power station is a small lignite coal-fired power station in Orhaneli, Bursa Province, Turkey.

== History ==
The power station was completed in 1991. It was shut down in January 2020 for not meeting new emission rules but reopened in June with a temporary licence to January 2021.

== Environment ==
Right to Clean Air Platform has called for flue gas emissions figures to be released.
