= Akçadağ Holding =

Turkish conglomerate

- Company type: Private
- Owner: Yavuz Akçadağ

Akçadağ Holding (Akçadağ Grup in Turkish) is a holding company in Turkey with businesses in construction, energy, mining and telecoms. It is a family business owned by Yavuz Akçadağ. In 2025 they bought Çayırhan power station from the government for 20 billion lira.
