= Circulating fluidized bed =

Element of an industrial furnace

The circulating fluidized bed (CFB) is a type of fluidized bed combustion that utilizes a recirculating loop for even greater efficiency of combustion. while achieving lower emission of pollutants. Reports suggest that up to 95% of pollutants can be absorbed before being emitted into the atmosphere. The technology is limited in scale however, due to its extensive use of limestone, and the fact that it produces waste byproducts.

== Introduction ==
Fluidization is the phenomenon by which solid particles are transported into a fluid-like state through suspension in a gas or liquid. The resultant mixing of gas and solids promotes rapid heat transfer and chemical reactions within the bed. Power plants that use this technology are capable of burning low grade fuels at high efficiency and without the need for expensive fuel preparation. They are also smaller than the equivalent conventional furnace, so may offer significant advantages in terms of cost and flexibility.

Circulating fluidized bed is a relatively new technology with the ability to achieve lower emission of pollutants. Extensive research has been conducted on this technology within the past 15 years due to increasing concerns over pollution caused by traditional methods of combusting coal and its sustainability. The importance of this technology has grown recently because of tightened environmental regulations for pollutant emission.

The Mercury and Air Toxic Standards (MATS) enacted in December 2011 in the United States by the Environmental Protection Agency have forced all the countries in Europe and America to strictly adhere to this policy. This means that emissions such as metals, acid gases, organic compound, flue gas acids and other pollutants from power plants or industrial facilities have to meet the requirements set by EPA and upgrades have to be done for facilities that do not meet the standards. As a result, the demand for circulating fluidized bed technology is predicted to rise.

In 1923, Winkler's coal gasifier represented the first significant large-scale industrial application of fluidized bed (Kunii and Levenspiel, 1991). CFB combustion technology continues to grow strongly in large utility power plant applications as CFB boiler technology has grown from small-scale industrial applications to large ultra-supercritical power plants in less than 20 years. Prime examples, both provided by Sumitomo SHI FW are the 460 MW supercritical CFB power plant operating since 2009 in Lagisza, Poland, and 2200 MW ultrasupercritical Samcheok (Korea) Green Power Plant successfully running since 2016.

== Fluidization regimes and classification ==
Fluidization is the phenomenon by which solid particles are transported into a fluid like state through suspension in a gas or liquid. In fact, there is a simple and precise way to classify the various fluid-particle beds (Winaya et al., 2003; Souza-Santos, 2004; Basu, 2006). Most of the CFB operating and environmental characteristics are the direct results of the hydrodynamic behaviour. Numerous researchers have studied the hydrodynamics of CFB (Yang, 1998; Basu, 2006; Rhodes, 2008; Scala, 2013). The fluidization is a function of several parameters such as the particles’ shape, size and density, velocity of the gas, beds' geometries etc. Kunii and Levenspiel (1991), Oka and Dekker (2004), and Souza-Santos (2004) defined the regimes of fluidization as described below:

(a) Fixed Bed: When the fluid is passed through the bottom of the bed at a low flow rate, the fluid merely percolates through the void spaces between stationary particles.

(b) Minimum fluidization: When the gas velocity reaches (U_{mf}) minimum fluidization velocity, and all the particles are just suspended by the upward flowing fluid.

(c) Bubbling Fluid Bed: When the flow rate increases beyond the minimum fluidization velocity, bed starts bubbling. The gas-solid system shows large instabilities with bubbling and gas channelling with rise in flow rate beyond minimum fluidization. Such a bed is called aggregative, heterogeneous, or bubbling fluidized.

(d) Turbulent Fluidized Bed: When the gas flow rate sufficiently increases, the terminal velocity (U_{tr}) of solids is exceeded, the upper surface of the bed disappears, entrainment becomes appreciable instead of bubbling,

(e) Fast Fluidized Bed: With further increasing in gas velocity, solids are carried out of the bed with the gas making a lean phase fluidized, this regime is used for operating CFB. In the present work, fast fluidized bed is used to operate the CFB where the pressure drop decreases dramatically in this regime.

(f) Pneumatic Transport: Beyond the circulating fluidized bed operating regime, there is the pneumatic transport region, pressure drop increases in this regime.

An appreciated contribution by Geldart (1973) classified the particles based on size and density into four groups viz. C, A, B, and D. Group B (of particle size d_{p} between 40–500 μm and density of ρ_{s}<~1400 kg/m^{3}) is commonly used for CFB. Yang modified Geldart's classification using Archimedes number Ar, under elevated pressure, temperature, and non-dimensional density (Yang, 2007).

Pressure and Pressure Drop The flow in a CFB is multiphase. The unrecoverable pressure drop along the riser height is a basic value for design; and this results due to solid particles distribution, voidage, gas viscosity, gas velocity, gas density, and density of solid.

=== Basis of technology ===
During the combustion phase, upwards jets of air will cause the solid fuels to be suspended. This is to ensure the gas and solids will mix together turbulently for better heat transfer and chemical reactions. The fuel will be burnt at a temperature of 1400 °F (760 °C) to 1700 °F(926.7 °C) to prevent nitrogen oxide from forming. While burning, flue gas such as sulfur dioxide will be released. At the same time, sulfur-absorbing chemical such as limestone or dolomite will be used to mix with the fuel particles in the fluidization phase, which will absorb almost 95% of the sulfur pollutants.

Alternatively, the sulfur absorbing chemical and fuel will be recycled to increase the efficiency of producing a higher quality steam as well as lower the emission of pollutants. Therefore, it will be possible to use circulating fluidized bed technology to burn fuel in a much more environmental friendly method as compared to other conventional processes.

== Range of applications ==
Circulating fluidized bed technology can be implemented in many different fields ranging from oil and gas to power stations. This technology is highly sought after due to its numerous benefits. Some of the popular applications of circulating fluidized bed are circulating fluidized bed scrubber and circulating fluidized bed gasification system.

=== Circulating fluidized bed scrubber ===
One of the applications of a circulating fluidized bed scrubber is at power stations which utilize a dry sorbent usually Ca(OH)_{2} to reduce pollutants like HF, HCL, SO_{2} and SO_{3} in a flue gas stream. Currently, Basin Electric Power Cooperative are the only company operating the best available circulating fluidized bed scrubbing technology for a coal-fired boiler plant near Gillette, Wyoming since 2011.—

The three major components of the circulating fluidized bed scrubber in power plants are:

- Circulating fluidized bed absorber
- Fabric filter
- Dry lime hydration system.

In the circulating fluidized bed scrubber process, flue gas will enter the reactor from the bottom of the vessel. Simultaneously, hydrated lime will be injected into the circulating fluidized bed absorber for reaction to take place to convert SO_{2} and SO_{3} from the flue gas to calcium sulfate and calcium sulfite. Water will also be injected at the same time to control the operation temperature for maximum absorption capacity. The flue gas will then send to the bag house for further filtration. In the bag house, a series of air valves across the filters, will produce compressed air bursts to ensure a more efficient solid and dust collection. Lastly, clean flue gas will then be directed to the stack with the minimum pollutants in the flue gas stream. The schematic diagram of the process is shown in Figure 1.

=== Circulating fluidized bed gasification system ===
Gasification is the process of converting biodegradable waste materials into synthetic gas without combustion. This process is first used at the Gussing power plant in Austria based on the steam gasification of biomass in the internally circulating fluidized bed.

In the gasification process, fuel will be gasified at 850 °C in the presence of steam to produce a nitrogen-free and clean synthetic gas. Charcoal will be burnt with air in the

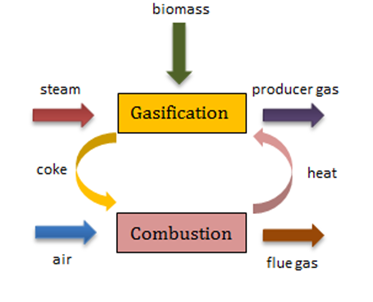
Figure 2: Showing Gasification Process Schematic Diagram

combustion chamber to provide the heating for the gasification process as it is an endothermic process. Thermal transfer will take place between the gasification and combustion chamber. The illustrated gasification process is presented in Figure 2.

The chemical reaction that takes place in the gasification as shown in equation [1] and [2] whereas the reaction in combustion chamber is represent in equation [3].

Gasification;

C + H2O = CO + H2 [1]

C + CO2 = 2CO [2]

Combustion;

C + O2 = CO2 [3]

Dolomite lime or limestone can also be used to increase the hydrogen concentration by absorbing carbon dioxide to increase the combustion process.

== Advantages and limitations ==
Wet flue gas desulfurization (Wet FGD) has typically been used to capture the pollutants gas. However, this machinery is expensive, hard to maintain and takes a lot of space in power plant. Wet FGD uses lot of water, however only marginal metals like mercury and acid gases such as HCl, HF, SO2 and SO3 can be captured.

The use of CFB's and dry scrubbers in the Virginia City Hybrid Energy Center allows it to capture up to 99.6% of the SO2 emitted.

The new technology of circulating fluidized bed scrubber (CFBS) was introduced circa 1984. The turbulator wall design will ensure a perfect mixing and the ability to capture various pollutants. The used of alloy metals had been replaced with a carbon steel design, reducing the installation cost. It also comes in a compact size thus the capital costs could be reduced. The water usage can also be reduced with the design of plug-free water spray nozzles. The CFBS can undergo a self-cleaning process, reducing the cost of maintenance. The operating temperature is lower thus the production of the nitrogen oxides, a contributor to smog, is lower.

Despite all the advantages, the CFBS is limited to 400 MW per unit. The limestone used in the CFBS is expensive and must be kept either in a concrete or steel silo rather than a pile[8]. Besides that, this machinery also produces a by-product, for instance CaCl that do not have many uses due to its properties.

Another type of CFB is circulating fluidized bed gasification (CFBG), which is preferable to other type of gasifiers. CFBG has a high mass and heat transfer rate as well as high efficient gas-solid contacting. At low operating temperature of CFBG, a longer residence time of solid can be achieved leading to a higher gasification yield. CFBG process is more energy efficient as it is an endothermic process. Only the required heat will be generated to maintain the process at the optimum temperature. Practically, all the heat produced will be utilized throughout all the processes, as it is an adiabatic and isothermal process.

Even though, the CFBG process is able to manage huge range of fuels, high gasification yield cannot be achieved for the fuels that are less reactive such as anthracite and pet coke because of the low operating temperature. The flow is also multiphase complex and every distinct particles need to be scaled-up in a different way

== Available design ==
Nowadays, several designs have been invented for CFBS for example the CFBS developed by Clyde Bergemann Power Group namely circulating dry scrubbers (CDS). This type of CFBS consists of three distinct feedback control loops which are for temperature, pressure drop and sulphur dioxide emission. In order to minimize erosion, its injection was designed to be above the venturi. Not only that, the CDS contains less moving parts compared to other type of CFBS. This design will lead to a lower maintenance cost. Major components of the CDS are shown in Figure 3.

Similar to CFBS, there are several designs available with specific specification to fulfill various industrial demands. One of the types is the CFBG, developed by the Phoenix BioEnergy. This type of CFBG combines several technologies and implement the auger gasifier into one design. The large diameter of the auger will be placed horizontally on top of the fluidized bed. This configuration will increase the gasification efficiency, which will assist in the heat transfer over the suspended aggregate into the biofuel. Full design of this CFBG is shown in Figure 4.

== Main process characteristics ==
The circulating fluidized bed reactors have been widely used in various industrial processes such as gasification and coal combustion. Though the circulating fluidized beds are used widely, the CFD, which can be, describe by non-uniformity flow patterns and a thorough back mixing still possess significant radial gradients in the particle density and a lower solid holdup inside the riser interior compared to the wall of the reactor. These events will then result in low contact efficiency.

For the case of catalytic gas-phase reaction process, gas back mixing should be avoided thus the reacted product is the gas phase. Another characteristic of the circulating fluidized bed is, as it required promoting the small contact time of gas and solid catalyst and plug flow, a significant high gas velocity in the riser is needed. The significant high gas velocity in the riser is also desired to fulfill the necessity in the catalytic gas-phase reaction.

=== Design and operation ===
The circulating fluidized bed involves basically two balancing characteristics of the gas-solid system, which are the design and the operation characteristics.

Design: Recirculating loop of particles occurred when entrained particles, which possess a substantial amount of flux, are separated efficiently and externally to the reactor from a giant core reactor (riser) from its carrying fluid and will then be circulated back to the bottommost of the riser. The carrying fluid will circulate around this loop only once however the particle will pass through several times before finally leaving the system

Operational: The system is usually operated under high particle flux and high superficial gas velocity, which are typically (10–1000 kg/m^{2}s), and (2–12 m/s) respectively. This operational condition is chosen to avoid a distinct interface between the dilute region and the dense bed inside the riser. Thus gas velocities above the bubbling point is chosen for contacting. The standard operating conditions for the circulating fluidized bed can be seen in Table 1 below.

Table 1:Typical operational condition for circulating fluidized bed in commercial use
| Parameters | Accepted Values |
|---|---|
| Superficial gas velocity (m/s) | 2–12 |
| Net solids flux through the riser (kg/m^{2}s) | 10–1000 |
| Temperature (°C) | 20–950 |
| Pressure (kPa) | 100–2000 |
| Mean particle diameter (μm) | 50–500 |
| Overall riser height (m) | 15–40 |

== Process characteristics assessments ==
The circulating fluidized bed (CFB) uses high fluid velocity to provide better gas-solid contact by providing more intense mixing of the fluid so that better quality of product can be obtained. However, the high gas velocities and the recirculation of solids may make the CFB system much more expensive in term of power requirement and investment compared to conventional fluidized bed reactors. CFBs have been widely used in the field of solid catalyzed gas phase reactions in two situations below.

1. Continuous regeneration of catalyst, which deactivates rapidly. The solid is maintained in constant circulation where catalyst is continuously regenerated and return to the reactor.
2. Heat must be brought in or removed from a reactor. A continuous circulation of solids between vessels can efficiently transport heat from one vessel to another since solids have relatively large heat capacity compared to gases.

One important factor of circulating systems is the ability to control the feed circulation rate. The feed circulation rate is controlled by the gas velocity in the bed which determines the flow regime and density of bed. All the circulating systems can be characterized either by the solid circulation rate, kg/s and the transfer ratio of the suspended materials being exchanged between vessels.

For circulating fluidized bed in coal combustion, the beds need to use a greater fluidizing speed, so the particles will remain constant in the flue gases, before moving across the combustion chamber and into the cyclone. During combustion, a dense bed is required to mix the fuel even though the solids are dispersed evenly all over the unit. The bigger particles are extracted and returned to combustion chamber for further process, which required relatively longer particle residence time. If the total carbon conversion efficiencies gets over 98% it shows good separation process that leaves simply a minor proportion of unburned char in the residues. During the whole process, the operating conditions are relatively uniform for the combustor.

== Possible design heuristics ==
In designing a circulating fluidized bed, with constant temperature distribution for either endothermic or exothermic reactions, in order to determine the appropriate design for cooling or heating of the circulating fluidized bed reactors, a good approximation of heat transfer rates are necessary for better control so that the reactor can change its performance for different operating conditions. For highly exothermic reactor, it is recommended to keep the conversion of material low and recycle any possible cooled reactants. It is also recommended to separate the components in order of decreasing percentage of material in feed. This will help in reducing the cost of maintenance for the next separation process.

In many industrial processes that involved small, porous or light particle which have to be fluidized with more viscous fluid in the present of gas, a gas–liquid–solid circulating fluidized bed (GLSCFB) is more preferred compared to conventional system because it can minimize dead zone and increase the contacting efficiency among gas, liquid and solid phases by improving the shear stress between those phases. Gas–liquid–solid circulating fluidized bed also can provide higher gas holdup, produce more uniform bubble size, better interphase contact, and good heat and mass transfer capabilities. The flexibility of using GLSCFB allows the fluidized bed to operate at much more higher liquid velocity than the minimum fluidization velocity which in turn increase the fractional conversion as well as production efficiency per unit cross-sectional area of the bed. Moreover, the deactivated catalyst used in the GLSCFB can be regenerated continuously by using the circulating fluidized bed which in turn reduced the operating cost for replacing the catalyst frequently.

As for circulating fluidized bed scrubbers (CFBS), it is more preferred in industry due to its ability to produce higher purity product while avoiding the corrosion issue. The CFBS also preferred because it requires low installation cost, high capture of metals, low maintenance required, wide fuel sulphur flexibility and fast response to cope with changes in operating condition. Some modification is necessary at the inlet in order to eliminate loss of solids materials at the bottom of bed during low-load operation. For better quality of product, it is advisable to purify the feed stream if it is difficult to separate between the impurity and the desired product if it is present in large amount.

This will enable the fluidized bed to operate at full capacity range in a stable manner. Every CFBS need to have larger boilers that are connected to several cyclones in parallel as to remove the solids for recirculation. CFBS also need to have heat recovery unit as some of the heat from the bottom ash can be recovered as it is more economically feasible in term of lowering the operating cost. Ash coolers are prone to foul the bed while the heat transfer tubes in fluidized bed are prone to erosion can be removed by the use of some fluidizing air.

== New development ==
More new clean technology has to be implemented to maintain the sustainability of the earth. Bigger reactors, with lower pollutants emission, have to be developed to meet the global demand. One of the best clean technologies to be used is the circulating fluidized bed technology .

=== In-bed heat exchanger ===
Another major field that is currently being looked into is the further development of in-bed heat exchanger used with circulating fluidized bed technology. With this design, the bed materials fill the in-bed heat exchanger through the open top of the circulating fluidized bed furnace, which enables the control of materials through the in-bed heat exchanger. By being able to control the materials throughput rate, better control of heat absorption as well as bed temperature in the furnace is achievable. With further development in this field, we will be able to fully utilize the energy required to drive the furnace with minimum energy wastage.

=== U-beam separator design ===
The U-beam separator design has been improved for better efficiency, reliability as well as maintainability and it is now in the 4th generation of its design as shown in Figure 6.

Improved design has brought numerous benefits to the circulating fluidized bed technology. Some of the benefits are as follows:

- High solids collection efficiency
- Controlled furnace temperature
- Low auxiliary power
- Smaller footprint
- Minimal refractory use
- Low maintenance
