= İkizköy =

- Neighbourhood
- Location in Turkey İkizköy (Turkey Aegean)
- Coordinates: 37°10′19″N 27°51′13″E
- Country: Turkey
- Province: Muğla
- District: Milas
- Population (2022): 207
- Time zone: UTC+3 (TRT)
- Postal code: 48200
- Area code: 0252

İkizköy (also: Ekizköy) is a neighbourhood of the municipality and district of Milas, Muğla Province, Turkey. Its population is 207 (2022). Some of its Akbelen Forest is being cut down to make way for coal mining.

== Notable people ==
- Nejla Işık, environmental activist and community leader, and her daughter, Esra
