= Electricity Generation Company (Turkey) =

Electricity generating and trading organisation owned by the Turkish state

Electricity Generation Company Elektrik Üretim A.Ş.
- Company type: SOE
- Industry: Utilities; Energy
- Founded: 2001; 25 years ago
- Headquarters: Ankara, Turkey
- Key people: Halil Alış (Chairman)
- Products: Lignite mining, electricity generation, transmission and trading
- Revenue: US$5.40 billion (2023)
- Net income: US$476 million (2023)
- Total assets: US$8.70 billion (2023)
- Total equity: US$6.78 billion (2023)
- Number of employees: 5621
- Website: www.euas.gov.tr

The Electricity Generation Company (Turkish: Elektrik Üretim A.Ş.; EÜAŞ) is the largest electric power company in Turkey. As a SOE, it operates within the national electricity market, generating and selling electricity throughout the country.

== History ==
EÜAŞ was founded by the government in 2001. Its main purpose was to plan and implement the energy policy of Turkey which, through the exploitation of the domestic products and resources, would distribute cheap electric power to all Turkish citizens. In 2018, it took over the state-owned electricity trading firm TETAŞ.

== Power plants ==
As of 2019, EUAŞ owns almost a fifth of Turkey's total generating capacity including coal, gas, hydro and wind power stations.

== Lignite coalfields ==
As of 2020, EUAŞ owns most of the country's lignite in 7 coalfields, including the largest Elbistan.

== Pollution and deaths ==
EÜAŞ owns the old Can-1 and Afşin-Elbistan B power stations and buys from private sector lignite-fired plants: these power plants pollute and cause early deaths.

== Electricity trading ==
Çan-2 coal-fired power station opened in 2018 and EÜAŞ guaranteed 7 years of electricity purchases at a cost of between 64 and 70m USD per year.

== Economics ==
EÜAŞ (with state-owned gas and oil company BOTAŞ) is an oligopoly and sets a soft cap on electricity spot prices; whereas prices to end consumers are regulated. In 2018 EÜAŞ lost 1.8 billion lira. Support for coal in Turkey resulting from annual expenditures of EÜAȘ in primary materials and supplies is estimated at ₺953 million (US$272 million) per year (2016–2017 average). According to Carbon Tracker in 2021 $300 m of the company's coal power investment on the Istanbul Stock Exchange was at risk of stranding.

== Greenhouse gas emissions ==
Climate TRACE estimates the company's coal-fired power stations emitted over 6 million tons of the country's total 730 million tons of greenhouse gas in 2022: it is on the Urgewald Global Coal Exit List.

== Sources ==
- Doukas, Alex; Gençsü, Ipek (June 2019). Turkey: G20 coal subsidies (PDF). Overseas Development Institute (Report). Archived from the original (PDF) on 2019-06-26.
- EÜAŞ - A briefing for investors, insurers and banks (PDF). Europe Beyond Coal (Report). January 2020.
