= Captive power plant =

Electricity generation facility

A captive power plant, also called autoproducer or embedded generation, is an electricity generation facility used and managed by an industrial or commercial energy user for their own energy consumption. Captive power plants can operate off-grid or they can be connected to the electric grid to exchange excess generation.

== Fields of application ==
Captive power plants are generally used by power-intensive industries where continuity and quality of energy supply are crucial, such as aluminum smelters, steel plants, chemical plants, etc. However, the radical cost declines for solar power systems have enabled the opportunity for less energy-intensive industries to economically grid defect by coupling solar PV with generators or cogeneration units along with battery systems.

== Types of captive power plants ==
Captive Power Plants can vary significantly based on the fuel sources they utilize and the technologies they employ, allowing companies to tailor their energy generation to specific operational needs and sustainability goals.

One common type of CPP is the fossil fuel-based plant, which relies on traditional energy sources such as coal, natural gas, or diesel. Coal-fired CPPs burn coal to produce steam that drives turbines connected to generators, generating electricity. Natural gas-fired CPPs use gas turbines or reciprocating engines, offering cleaner combustion and higher efficiency compared to coal. Diesel-based CPPs employ diesel engines and are often used for smaller operations or as backup power due to their quick start-up capabilities.

In response to environmental concerns, many companies are adopting renewable energy CPPs. These plants harness energy from sources like solar, wind, biomass, or hydroelectric power. Solar CPPs utilize photovoltaic panels to convert sunlight directly into electricity. Wind-based CPPs use turbines to capture wind energy, suitable for locations with consistent wind patterns. Biomass or biogas CPPs generate power by burning organic materials or utilizing gas produced from waste decomposition, thereby also addressing waste management issues.

Hybrid CPPs combine multiple energy sources to enhance reliability and efficiency. For example, a CPP might integrate solar power with natural gas, using solar energy during peak sunlight hours and switching to natural gas when solar output diminishes. This approach optimizes fuel usage and ensures a consistent power supply.

It is necessary to distinguish conventional CPPs from Combined Heat and Power plants. While CPPs focus primarily on generating electricity for exclusive use, CHPs simultaneously produce electricity and useful thermal energy from the same fuel source. CHPs aim to maximize energy efficiency by capturing waste heat for heating or industrial processes, whereas CPPs may not utilize this waste heat.

By selecting the appropriate type of Captive power plant, companies can achieve greater control over their energy production, reduce dependency on public grids, and align with environmental standards. The choice depends on factors such as fuel availability, cost considerations, technological preferences, and long-term sustainability objectives. Currently, diesel-driven CPPs hold the largest global CCP market share (35% by 2023), followed by renewable energy and gas.

== See also ==
- Distributed generation
- Prosumer
