= Urgewald =

Group which lists coal gas and oil companies

- Established: 1992 (34 years ago)
- Legal status: Registered association
- Headquarters: Sassenberg
- Membership: 46 (2025)
- Revenue: 4,435,682.79 euro (2023)
- Total Assets: 7,343,873.14 euro (2023)
- Website: urgewald.org/english

Urgewald is a group that researches coal companies, because they are among the top contributors to greenhouse gas emissions and so cause climate change. The Global Coal Exit List, which they publish, is famous.

Urgewald provided analysis to underpin a Guardian newspaper exposé on the "scores of vast projects" that the oil and gas majors are planning as of May 2022. If only a fraction of these projects proceed to exploitation, the consequences for the global climate will still be huge.

== See also ==
- Global Energy Monitor
