= Coal power in Turkey =

Coal in Turkey generated a third of the nation's electricity in 2023. There are 55 active coal-fired power stations with a total capacity of 21 gigawatts (GW). (Note: EMRA totals 15 + 22 + 15 = 52 coal power licences - but as ZETES 1 2 and 3 have the same licence if counted as separate power stations the total would be 54, which almost matches the total on the Turkish version of the Wikipedia list.) In 2023 coal imports for electricity generation cost US$3.7 billion.

Air pollution from coal-fired power stations is damaging public health, and it is estimated that a coal phase-out by 2030 instead of by the 2050s would save over 100,000 lives. Flue gas emission limits were improved in 2020, but data from mandatory reporting of emission levels is not made public. Turkey has not ratified the Gothenburg Protocol, which limits fine dust polluting other countries. As of 2023 official health impact assessment is not done in Turkey.

Turkey's coal is almost all low calorie lignite, but government policy supports its continued use. In contrast, Germany is closing lignite-fired stations under 150 MW. Drought in Turkey is frequent, but thermal power stations use significant amounts of water.

Coal-fired power stations are the largest source of greenhouse gas, at about a tonne each year per person, which is about the world average. Coal-fired stations emit over 1 kg of carbon dioxide for every kilowatt hour generated, over twice that of gas power. Academics suggest that in order to reach Turkey's target of carbon neutrality by 2053, coal power should be phased out by the mid-2030s. In January 2023 the National Energy Plan was published: it forecast a capacity increase to 24.3 GW by 2035, including 1.7 GW more by 2030. However, by 2024 it was obvious that no new coal power stations would be built, although Çelikler Holding still want to add units to Afşin Elbistan A, and Tufanbeyli management want to expand it, which are the only proposals for new unabated coal power in the OECD. The national plan forecasts coal generation decreasing but capacity payments continuing for flexible and baseload power, with coal power subsidies in the 4 years to 2030 estimated at $8.7 billion. Turkey is Europes top coal polluter outside Russia.

== Energy policy ==
Energy strategy includes increasing the share of not just renewable energy in Turkey, but also other local energy resources to support the country's development and to reduce dependence on energy imports. As of 2022 Turkey has not ratified the Gothenburg Protocol on emissions ceilings for sulphur dioxide and nitrogen oxides. Earlier in 2021 Turkey ratified the Paris Agreement to limit climate change, but as of October 2021 policy was still to increase domestic coal share in the energy mix, and planned increases in coal power were forecast to increase CO_{2} emissions. Greenhouse gas emissions are pledged to peak by 2038 at the latest.

== Generation ==
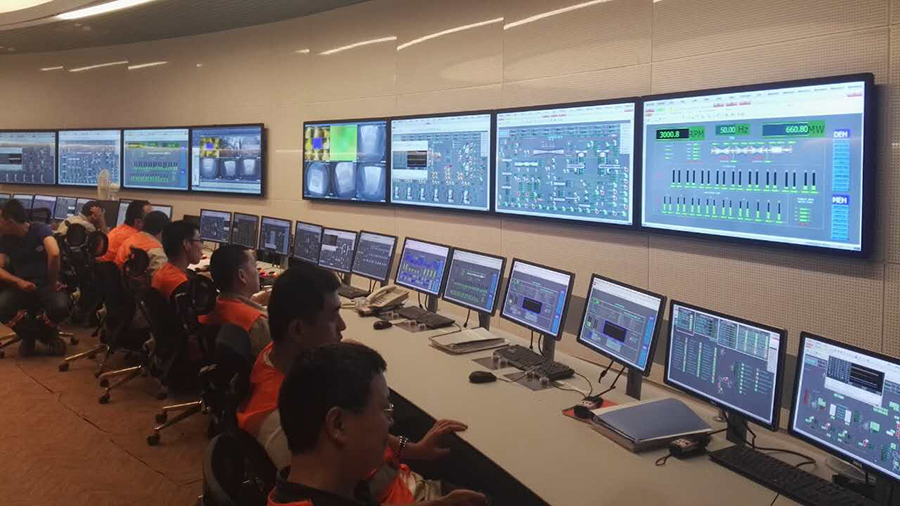
Control room of ZETES-3, one of many coal-fired power stations built in the 2010s

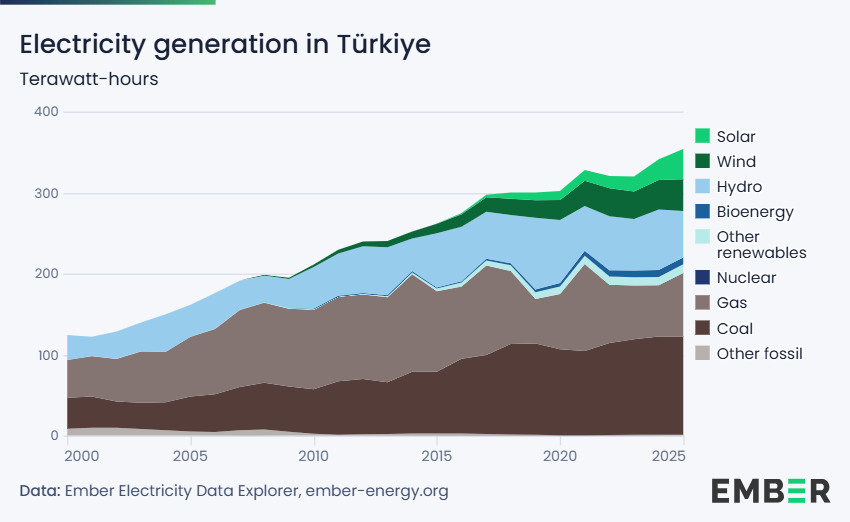
Coal (in dark brown) has remained about a third of electricity generation

Coal-fired power stations generate approximately one third of the nation's electricity: in 2020 made up of 62 TWh from imported coal and 44 TWh from local coal (almost all lignite). (Note: In 2022 coal-fired power stations gross generation was 113 terawatt hours (TWh), which was 36% of total gross generation. The figures in List of active coal-fired power stations in Turkey are net generation.) As of 2025 there are 55 (Note: See tr:Türkiye'deki kömür yakıtlı enerji santralleri listesi or its underlying Wikidata for details. Except for 1 hard coal and 1 asphaltite power station, all domestic coal power stations are lignite-fired power stations.) licensed coal-fired power stations with a total capacity in December 2022 of 21.8111 gigawatts (GW). There is no unlicensed coal power. The average thermal efficiency of Turkey's coal-fired power stations is 36%. Generation fell in 2021 due to the high cost of imported coal (over $70 /MWh). Emba Hunutlu was the last coal plant to be built and started up in 2022. Shanghai Electric Power said it would be China's largest ever direct investment in Turkey. However, according to the World Wide Fund for Nature, it could not make a profit if it was not subsidized. Afşin-Elbistan C and further new coal-fired power stations will probably not be constructed, due to public opposition, court cases, and the risk of them becoming stranded assets. Typical thermal efficiencies are 39%, 42% and 44% for subcritical, supercritical and ultra supercritical power stations.

In 2022 the average age of a coal power station was 17 years, as much of the operational fleet was built in the 21st century. There was oversupply of generating capacity and a drop in demand in 2020, and a quarter of power stations were estimated to be cashflow negative. Solar generation fits better with consumption, as annual peak electricity demand is on summer afternoons, due to air conditioning.

Germany is closing lignite-fired stations under 150 MW. Neighbouring Greece is closing down all its lignite-fueled power stations.

Yunus Emre power station was completed in 2020, but had only generated 700 hours of power to the grid by 2022. As coal in the local area is unsuitable for its boilers it became a stranded asset: it was bought by Yıldızlar Holding (Yıldızlar SSS Holding A.Ş. not to be confused with Yıldız Holding). In May 2023 Vice President Fuat Oktay said that unit 1 would be restarted in June, and by mid-August about 60 GWh had been sent to the grid.

With a few exceptions stations smaller than 200 MW provide both electricity and heat, often to factories, whereas almost all those larger than 200 MW just generate electricity. Companies owning large amounts of coal power include Eren, Çelikler, Aydem, İÇDAŞ, Anadolu Birlik (via Konya Sugar) and Diler.

=== Flexibility ===
Turkey plans to substantially increase the contribution of solar and wind power to its mix of generation. Cost-effective system operation with a high proportion of these intermittent generation sources requires system flexibility, where other sources of generation can be ramped up or down promptly in response to changes in intermittent generation. However, conventional coal-fired generation may not have the flexibility required to accommodate a large proportion of solar and wind power. Retrofitting to increase the ramp-up rate to reach full load in 1 hour, and lower minimum generation to half max may be possible for about 9 GW (just under half) of installed capacity. Lignite-fired power stations are less able to ramp up and down.

== Coal industry ==
Government policy supports continued generation from lignite (brown coal) because it is mined locally, whereas almost all hard coal (anthracite and bituminous coal) is imported. In 2020, 51 million tonnes (83%) of lignite and 22 million tonnes (55%) of hard coal was burnt in power stations.

In 2020 Anadolu Birlik Holding, Çelikler Holding, Ciner Holding, Diler Holding, Eren Holding, Aydem, IC İçtaş, Kolin and Odaş, were substantially involved in electricity generation from coal.

=== Locally mined lignite ===
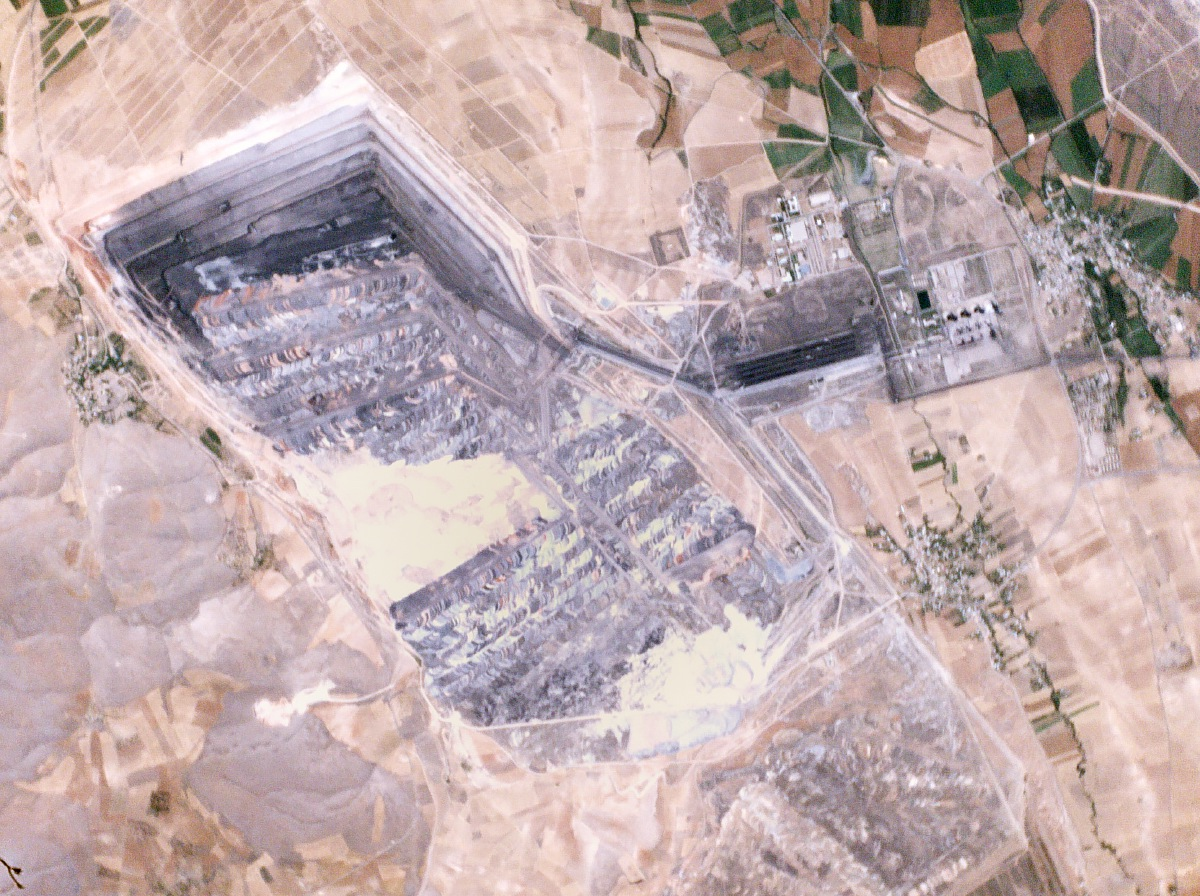
Lignite is burnt nearby, as here with the opencast mine feeding Afşin-Elbistan A power station to the right

Power stations burning lignite tend to be near local coalmines, such as Elbistan, because Turkish lignite's calorific value is less than 12.5 MJ/kg (and Afsin Elbistan lignite less than 5 MJ/kg, which is a quarter of typical thermal coal), and about 90% has lower heat value under 3,000 kcal/kg, so is not worth transporting. According to energy analyst Haluk Direskeneli because of the low quality of Turkish lignite large amounts of supplementary fuel oil is used in lignite-fired power stations. In 2025 he said that because flue gas treatment systems consume 8 to 10% of the electricity generated they are often not used. The emission factor is about 105 t/TJ.(cite 2023 NIR page 73 table 3.18)

=== Imported coal ===
To minimize transport costs, power stations burning imported coal are usually located on the coast; with clusters in Çanakkale and Zonguldak provinces and around Iskenderun Bay. Coal with up to 3% sulphur and minimum 5,400 kcal/kg can be imported, with capacity to burn about 25 million tons a year. In 2023 over half of thermal coal imports were from Russia. According to thinktank Ember, as of 2021, building new wind and solar power is cheaper than running existing coal power stations which depend on imported coal.

== Air pollution ==
Health effects of coal-fired power stations in Turkey 2019

Air pollution is a significant environmental and public health problem in Turkey, and has been for decades. (Note: Environmental impact assessments can be found by searching https://eced-duyuru.csb.gov.tr/eced-prod/duyurular.xhtml with Sektör=Enerji and Alt Sektör= Termik Santraller) A 1996 court order to shut 3 polluting power stations was not enforced. Levels of air pollution have been recorded above the World Health Organization (WHO) guidelines in 51 out of 81 provinces. As for long range air pollution, Turkey has not ratified the Gothenburg Protocol which covers PM 2.5 (fine particles), and reporting under the Convention on Long-Range Transboundary Air Pollution has been criticized as incomplete.

New flue gas emission limits were introduced in January 2020, resulting in five 20th-century power stations being shut down that month because they did not meet the new limits. They were all re-licensed after improvements in 2020, such as new flue gas filters, but the effectiveness of the improvements is being questioned, as expenditure may not have been sufficient. There is not enough data regarding modern filters, due to many government ambient air monitoring points both being defective and not measuring fine particulate matter. Fine particulates (PM2.5), are the most dangerous pollutant but have no legal ambient limit.

The "Industry Related Air Pollution Control Regulation" says that flue-gas stacks must be at least 10m from the ground and 3m above the roof. Larger power stations must measure local pollutants vented into the atmosphere from the smokestack and report them to the Environment Ministry but, unlike the EU, they are not required to publish the data. In 2022 academics called for better monitoring and stricter emission limits.

Coal contributes to air pollution in big cities. Air pollution from some large coal-fired power stations is publicly visible in Sentinel satellite data. The Organisation for Economic Co-operation and Development (OECD) says that old coal-fired power stations are emitting dangerous levels of fine particulates: so it recommends reducing particulate emissions by retrofitting or closing old coal-fired power plants. Although the Turkish government receives reports of measurements of air pollution from the smokestacks of individual coal-fired power stations, it does not publish the reports, unlike the EU. There is a pollutant release and transfer register, but as of September 2024 no years are publicly searchable because it is not yet technically complete, and it is not known what exemptions will be granted.(see FAQ).

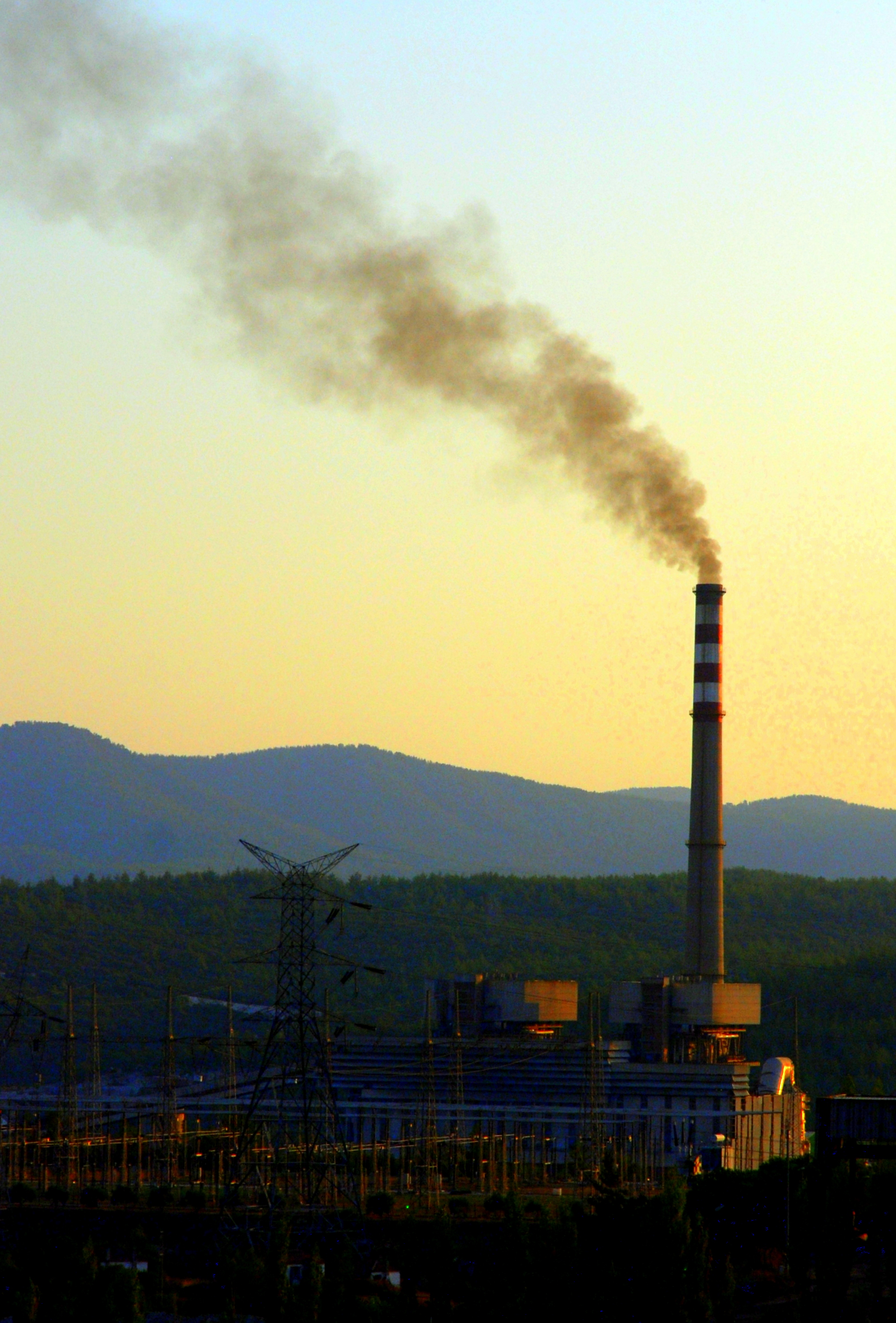
Yeniköy power station in Milas, Muğla

Flue gas emission limits in milligrams per cubic metre (mg/Nm^{3}) are:

Size of power station	Dust	SO_{2}	NO_{2}	CO
0.5 MW ≤ capacity < 5 MW	200	Desulfurisation system not required if the SO_{2} and SO_{3} emissions are below 2000 mg/Nm3 . If the 2000 mg/Nm3 limit is exceeded, then SO_{2} emissions must be reduced to 10%.	NO_{x} emissions should be reduced by technical measures such as reducing the flame temperature by recirculating the flue gas.	200
5 MW ≤ capacity < 50 MW	150	Desulfurisation system not required if the SO_{2} and SO_{3} emissions are below 2000 mg/Nm3 . If the 2000 mg/Nm3 limit is exceeded, then SO_{2} emissions must be reduced to 10%.	NO_{x} emissions should be reduced by technical measures such as reducing the flame temperature by recirculating the flue gas.	200
50 MW ≤ capacity < 100 MW	50	850	400	150
capacity ≥ 100 MW	30	200	200	200

The limits are laxer than the EU Industrial Emissions Directive and the SO_{2} limit for large coal-fired power plants in other countries, such as India at 100 mg/m^{3}, and China at 35 mg/m^{3}. Power plants less than 50 MW do not have to register for an SYD certificate.

== Greenhouse gas emissions ==
Coal is the largest source of greenhouse gas emissions by Turkey

Coal emits more CO_{2} than oil or gas

Coal-fired power stations emit over 1 kg of carbon dioxide for every kilowatt hour generated, over twice that of gas-fired power stations. Turkey's coal-fired power stations are the largest contributor to the country's greenhouse gas emissions. (Note: UNFCCC category 1.A.1. Energy industries a. Public electricity and heat production:solid fuels. shows 116 megatonnes of CO_{2}, which is larger than any other category.) Production of public heat and electricity emitted 138 megatonnes of CO_{2} equivalent (CO_{2}e) in 2019, mainly through coal burning.

Because lignite quality varies greatly, to estimate the carbon dioxide emissions from a particular power station, the net calorific value of the lignite it burnt must be reported to the government. But this is not published, unlike some other countries. However public information from space-based measurements of carbon dioxide by Climate TRACE is expected to reveal individual large power stations in 2022, and smaller ones by GOSAT-GW in 2023 and possibly in 2025 by Sentinel-7.

A 2020 study estimated that fitting carbon capture and storage to a power station burning Turkish lignite would increase the cost of its electricity by over 50%. In 2021 Turkey targeted net zero carbon emissions by 2053. After the Paris Agreement on limiting climate change was ratified in 2021 many environmental groups called for the government to set a target year for coal phase-out.

Coal combustion emitted over 150 Mt of CO_{2} in total in 2018, about a third of Turkey's greenhouse gas. (Note: 29% of the 521 Mt gross emissions in 2018 or 35% of the 426 Mt net emissions) Emissions from individual power plants over 20 MW are measured. Life-cycle emissions of Turkish coal-fired power stations are over 1 kg CO_{2}eq per kilowatt-hour.

As of 2019 coal mine methane remains an environmental challenge, because removing it from working underground mines is a safety requirement but if vented to the atmosphere it is a potent greenhouse gas.

== Water consumption ==
Because Turkey's lignite-fired power stations have to be very close to their mines to avoid excessive lignite transport costs, they are mostly inland (see map of active coal-fired power stations in Turkey). Coal power stations may require a large quantity of water for the circulating water plant and coal washing if required. In Turkey, fresh water is used because of the locations of the plants. Between 600 and 3000 cubic metres of water is used per GWh generated, much more than solar and wind power. This intensive use has led to shortages in nearby villages and farmlands.

== Ash ==
The mineral residue that remains from burning coal is known as coal ash, and contains toxic substances that may pose a health risk to workers in coal-fired power stations and people living or working near Turkey's large coal ash dams. A 2021 report from İklim Değişikliği Politika ve Araştırma Derneği (Climate Change Policy and Research Association) said that 2020s environmental law was being evaded by the repeated granting of less stringent 1 year temporary operating licenses, and said that coal ash storage permit criteria (inspections by universities) were unclear, so some power stations were not properly storing unhealthy coal ash . They said that some inspections may be insufficient and summarized inspection reports as:

2020–2021 Ash environmental protection systems of some coal-fired power stations - missing information Key: ✓=information provided in report: blank=no information provided and feature may or may not exist
Power station name	Dry Storage	Wet Storage	Surrounding channels	Wall	Pump system	Groundwater Pollution Analysis/Monitoring	Observation Well	Wire Fence	Drainage System	Slope	Other
Afşin Elbistan B	✓		✓			✓	✓	✓		✓	Dust Control Plan should be prepared.
Yatağan		✓	✓	✓					✓	✓	Impermeable zone problem
18 Mart Çan	✓			✓		✓				✓	
Kemerköy		✓	✓	✓		✓		✓		✓	The landfill is in the forest area
Yeniköy			✓	✓	✓	✓		✓			The landfill is in the forest area
Kangal			✓				✓	✓		✓	
Soma							✓				The safety of embankments, sitting, sliding, etc. monitoring/progress report for monitoring and reporting
Tunçbilek							✓			✓	Complying with the provisions of the Regulation on Buildings to be Constructed in Earthquake Zones and the Regulation on Buildings to be Constructed in Disaster Zones
Orhaneli			✓							✓	Complying with the provisions of the Regulation on Buildings to be Constructed in Earthquake Zones and the Regulation on Buildings to be Constructed in Disaster Zones
Seyitömer									✓	✓	Complying with the provisions of the Regulation on Buildings to be Constructed in Earthquake Zones and the Regulation on Buildings to be Constructed in Disaster Zones
Çayırhan			✓			✓		✓		✓	
ÇATES		✓	✓	✓		✓					Impermeable zone construction
Afşin Elbistan A											Re-evaluation of the commitments given in the EIA Report for the construction of the Landfill Facility within the scope of the Circular

== Taxes, subsidies and incentives ==
Around the year 2000 government incentives were offered to build cogeneration power stations (such as autoproducers in factories but not connected to the grid), much small cogeneration was built in industrial parks or in sugar factories. About 20 of these small autoproducers were operating by 2021 but there is no list publicly available as they are not connected to the grid and no longer require licences. (Note: Some former autoproducer licencees are listed in table 20 of the following cite from 2007, but it is not publicly known exactly which are still operating.) Because of its low calorific value lignite-fired electricity costs more to generate than in other European countries (except for Greece). Up to 60% of output from each local coal power plant is guaranteed 7.5 UScent per kWh price by the government until 2030.

The companies which built most recent stations: Cengiz, Kolin, Limak and Kalyon; are mainly in the construction rather than the energy sector; and some say they took on lignite-power at a loss to be politically favoured for other construction projects.

In 2023 350.org estimated total coal power assets at US$20 billion and said that all local insurance was underwritten internationally. A 2024 report from the Coal Producers Association gave examples of 13% interest rates, although the central bank rate for lira was 45% to 50%. This is because the Association assumes borrowing in dollars and getting a power purchase agreement in dollars.

In 2019 large lignite-burning stations were subsidized with capacity payments totalling over 1 billion lira (US$180 million, which was over half of total capacity payments), and in 2020 over 1.2 billion lira (US$210 million). In 2021 four power stations burning a mixture of lignite and imported coal also received capacity payments. This capacity mechanism has been criticised by some economists, as they say it encourages strategic capacity withholding, with a study of 2019 data showing that a 1% increase in the electricity price correlated with a 1-minute increase in length of power station generation failures. There is also a market clearing price cap of 2,000 lira(about US$350 in 2021)/MWh. These economists say that auctions of firm capacity (this is done in some other countries), with a financial penalty if not delivered, would be a better mechanism. As of November 2022 23 coal-fired power stations are eligible for capacity mechanism payments.

Some electricity from these stations is purchased by the state-owned electricity company at a guaranteed price of US$50–55/MWh until the end of 2027. Imported coal is taxed at US$70 per tonne minus the price of coal on the international market. The EU Carbon Border Adjustment Mechanism could push coal-power after gas in the merit order: in other words it could become more expensive.

In 2025 thinktank Ember estimated coal subsidies for the following 4 years would total $8.7 billion, contradicting Türkiye's renewable goals and wrote: “Türkiye has committed to providing a purchase guarantee in dollars for domestic coal power plants by 2030. However, redirecting the $8.7 billion allocated for coal over four years to modernising the grid could enable new capacity for wind and solar investments and help to achieve the target of 120 GW of total installed wind and solar capacity by 2035. Furthermore, by removing barriers to rooftop, floating, hybrid, and storage-integrated solar projects, the energy transition could be accelerated without compromising supply security.”

=== Capacity payments ===
Unlike new solar and wind power in Turkey's electricity market, these were not decided by reverse auction but fixed by the government, and energy demand management is not eligible. Subsidy continues in 2020 and 13 coal-fired power stations received January payments. The Chamber of Engineers (tr:Makina Mühendisleri Odası) has called for the capacity mechanism to be scrapped.

== Phase-out ==
Studies show that coal power phase out is feasible. The insurance industry is slowly withdrawing from fossil fuels. In the mid-2020s plants fuelled by local coal became less profitable as the price of renewables and imported coal and gas fell, but converting them to run on imported coal or gas would be expensive.

In 2021 the World Bank said that a plan for a just transition away from coal is needed, and environmentalists say it should be gone by 2030. The World Bank has proposed general objectives and estimated the cost, but has suggested government do far more detailed planning. According to a 2021 study by several NGOs if coal power subsidies were completely abolished and a carbon price introduced at around US$40 (which is lower than the 2021 EU Allowance) then all coal power stations would close down before 2030. According to Carbon Tracker in 2021 $1b of investment on the Istanbul Stock Exchange was at risk of stranding, including $300 m for EÜAŞ. Turkey has $3.2 billion in loans for its energy transition. Small modular reactors have been suggested to replace coal power. A 2023 study suggests the early 2030s and at the latest 2035 as a practical target for phase-out. A 2024 study says that, although some plants would shutdown due to technological or economic obsolescence, a complete phase out by 2035 would require additional capital expenditure on electricity storage: however the study did not consider demand response or electricity trading with the EU.

Some energy analysts say old plants should be shut down. Three coal-fired power plants, which are in Muğla Province, Yatağan, Yeniköy and Kemerköy, are becoming outdated. However, if the plants and associated lignite mines were shut down, about 5000 workers would need funding for early retirement or retraining. There would also be health and environmental benefits, but these are difficult to quantify as very little data is publicly available in Turkey on the local pollution by the plants and mines. Away from Zonguldak mining and the coal-fired power plant employ most working people in Soma district. According to Coşku Çelik "coal investments in the countryside have been regarded as an employment opportunity by the rural population".

According to SwitchCoal a 20 billion dollar investment in converting 10 plants to solar, wind and batteries would make an extra 13 billion dollars profit over 30 years. They assumed no carbon pricing and estimated lignite opex at 1 UScent per kWh. They say this would save 35 megatonnes of emissions a year by installing 15 GWp of solar, 8 of wind and 0.7 GW battery.

Analyst Haluk Direskeneli said it 2025 that although they may longer be profitable it would be politically hard to shut down Soma, Tunçbilek, and Çatalağzı power stations as labour unions and opposition parties would likely protest possible job losses in their state-run coal suppliers TKİ and TTK.
