= Solar power in Turkey =

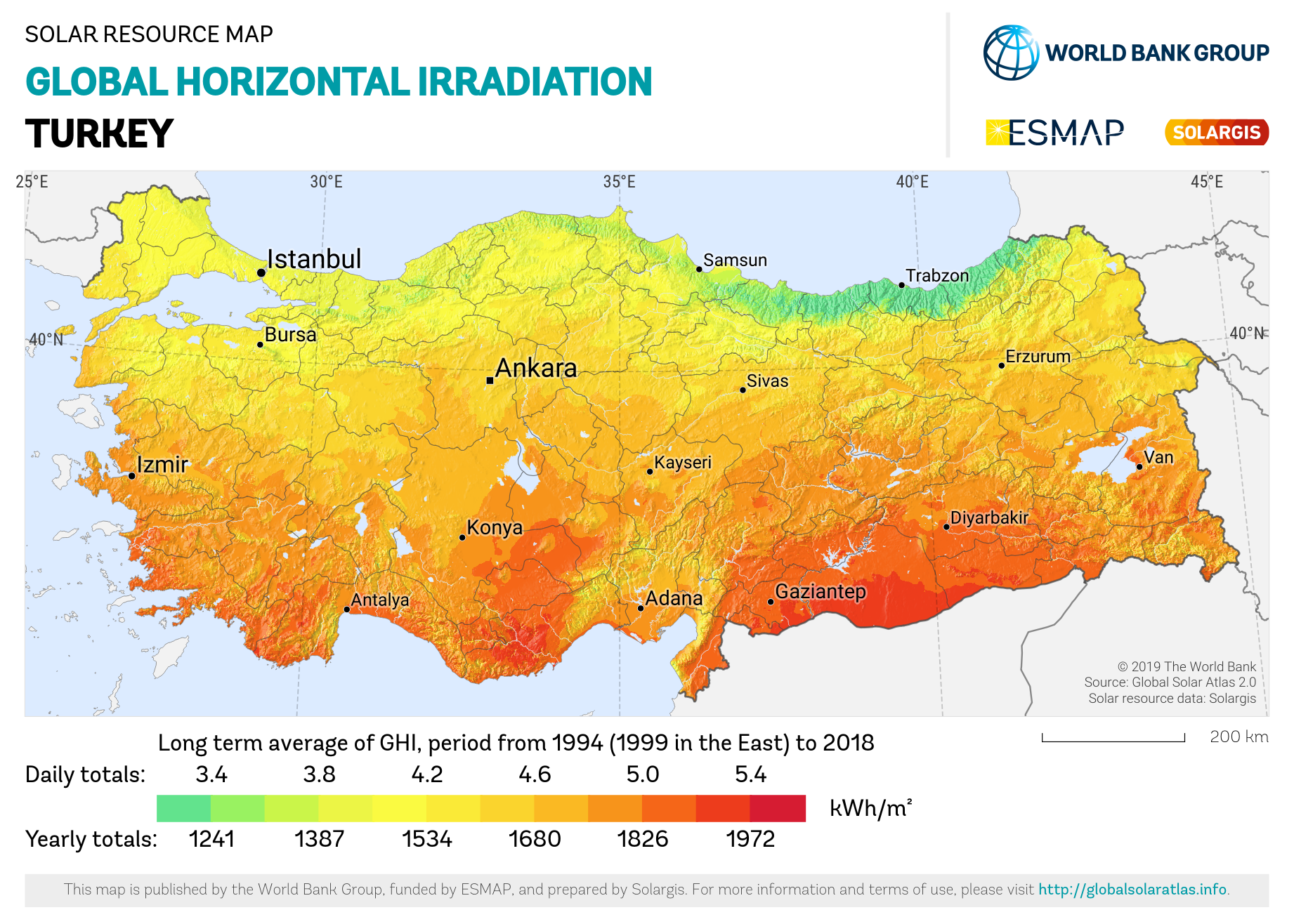
- Solar irradiation map of Turkey
- Installed capacity: 19.88 GW (2024) (14th)
- Annual generation: 25.67 TWh (2024)
- Capacity per capita: 236 W (2024)
- Share of electricity: 7.5% (2024)

Solar power suits Turkey's climate, especially in the South Eastern Anatolia and Mediterranean regions. Solar power is a growing part of renewable energy in the country, with almost 25 gigawatts (GW) of solar panels in 2025, of which 22 GW is commercial and industry rather than traditional power companies or residential rooftop solar as in many other countries. It generates 6% of the country's electricity. Solar thermal is also important.

Despite its similar suitability to solar power, Turkey has installed far less solar power than Spain. Solar power is the cheapest source of power and subsidizes coal and fossil gas power. Every gigawatt of solar power installed would save over US$100 million on gas import costs, and more of the country's electricity might be exported.

Most new solar power is tendered as part of hybrid power plants. Building new solar power plants would be cheaper than running existing import-dependent coal plants if they were not subsidized. However, think tank Ember has listed several obstacles to building utility-scale solar plants, such as insufficient new grid capacity for solar power at transformers, a 50 MW cap for any single solar power plant's installed capacity, and large consumers not allowed to sign long-term power purchase agreements for new solar installations. Ember says there is technical potential for 120 GW of rooftop solar, almost 10 times 2023 capacity, which they say could generate 45% of the country's 2022 demand.

== Background ==
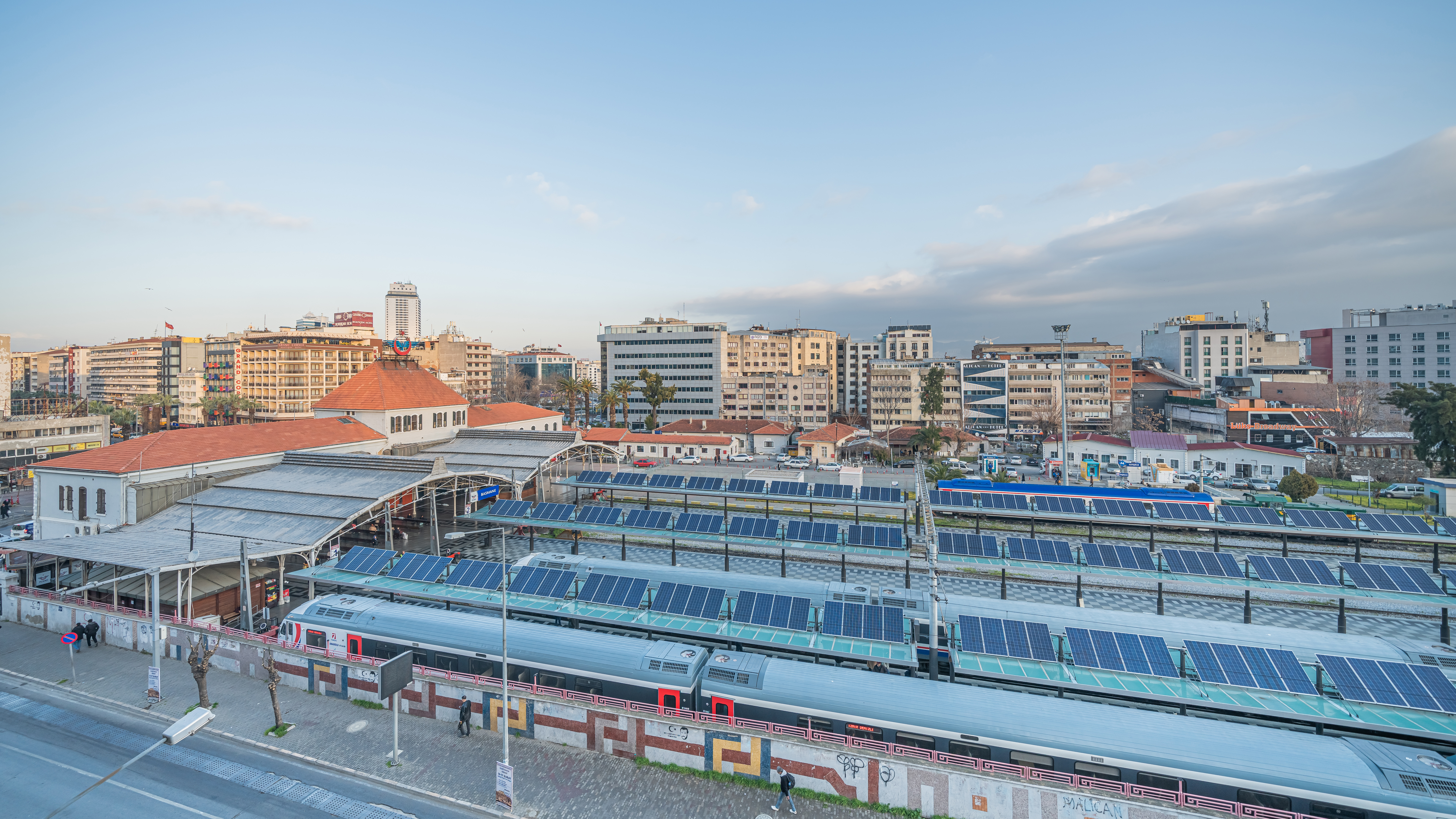
İzmir train station with solar panels

Turkey has a significant potential for generating energy from solar power; however, in terms of solar capacity per capita, it lags behind European leaders such as Spain and Italy, as well as countries with far inferior solar potential, such as Germany and the Netherlands. Turkey's total generation ranks it thirteenth globally in solar power by country, but its per capita solar capacity is thirty-ninth.

Virtually all of Turkey, except for its consistently cloudy northern coast, has over 2200 hours of sunshine; sunnier than most of non-Mediterranean Europe, and ideal for producing solar power. Solar potential is highest in the south-east of the country, and high-voltage DC transmission from that region to Istanbul has been suggested. Turkey's average annual solar irradiance is over 1 million terrawatt-hours, that is about 1500 kW·h/(m^{2}·yr) or over 4 kW·h/(m^{2}·d). Covering less than 5% of the country's land area with solar panels would provide all the energy needed. Solar power may also be preferable to other renewable energy sources such as wind power and hydroelectricity because wind speed and rainfall can be low in summer, which is when demand peaks due to air conditioning.

Solar water heating has been commonplace in Turkey since the 1970s, but the first licences for solar electricity generation were not granted until 2014. Fatih Birol, executive director of the International Energy Agency (IEA), said that in 2021 less than 3% of solar potential was being used.

== Policies and laws ==
The country plans to increase capacity to almost 53 GW by 2035. Systems producing over 5 megawatts (MW) of power must be licensed by the Energy Market Regulatory Authority if they feed into the grid.

Since 2021 feed-in tariffs for new installations have been in lira (but are maximum about US$0.05 per kWh) and set by the president, but the 10-year period has been criticised as too short. In 2022 there are many applications for hybrid solar and wind licences. As of 2022 there are 9 renewable energy cooperatives; it has been suggested that agricultural energy cooperatives would be profitable if farmers had more loans and technical help to establish them. Another state aid model in support of solar power is the so-called "YEKA" (abbreviation for "Yenilenebilir Enerji Kaynak Alanları", Renewable Energy Source Areas) model, prioritizing local content manufacturing or use. A successful application of the YEKA was the Karapınar Solar Energy Plant in Konya, with 1000 MWe installed capacity.

According to think tank Ember, building new wind and solar power is cheaper than running existing coal plants which depend on imported coal. But they say that there are obstacles to building utility-scale solar, such as lack of new capacity allocated for solar power at transformers, a 50 MW cap for any single solar power plant's installed capacity, and large consumers being unable to sign long-term power purchase agreements for new unlicensed solar installations. Ember recommend that rooftop solar should be obligatory on new buildings in Turkey. Owners of these small unlicensed installations can sell to the grid at the same price as they buy.

== Economics ==
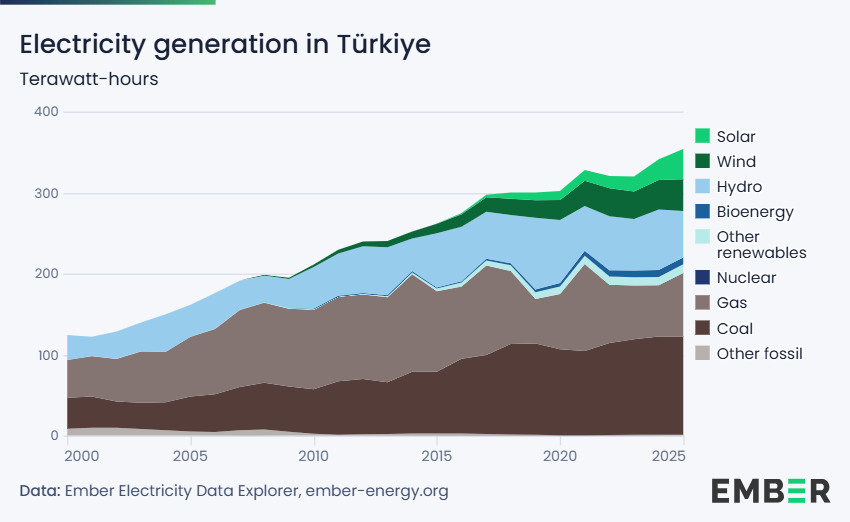
Solar (light green band) generates a small but increasing share of electricity.

As in many countries for many types of variable renewable energy, from time to time the government invites companies to tender sealed bids to construct a certain capacity of solar power to connect to certain electricity substations. By accepting the lowest bid the government commits to buy at that price per kWh for a fixed number of years, or up to a certain total amount of power. This provides certainty for investors against highly volatile wholesale electricity prices. However they may still risk exchange rate volatility if they borrowed in foreign currency. For example as Turkey does not have enough solar cell manufacturing capacity they would likely be bought from China and so would have to be paid for in foreign currency. In 22/23 a third of solar cell exports from China went to Turkey. However they are subject to tariffs.

In 2021 prices at these "solar auctions" were similar to or lower than average wholesale electricity prices, and large-scale solar for companies own use is also competitive; but macroeconomic challenges and exchange rate volatility are causing uncertainty. Installation costs are low and according to the Turkish Solar Energy Industry Association the industry provides jobs for 100,000 people. As part of the fourth round of solar auctions which are planned to total 1000 MW in lots of 50 MW and 100 MW, in April 2022 three lots of 100 MW were auctioned at prices around 400 lira per MWh, around 25 euros at the exchange rate at that time. The tender included a 60% foreign exchange weight clause, which partly protects against currency volatility, and selling on the open market is also allowed.

Modelling by Carbon Tracker indicates that new solar power will become cheaper than all existing coal plants by 2023. According to a May 2022 report from think tank Ember wind and solar saved 7 billion dollars on gas imports in the preceding 12 months. Every gigawatt of solar power installed would save over US$100 million on gas import costs. According to a 2022 study by Shura almost all coal power could be replaced by renewables (mainly solar) by 2030. Export of solar power could increase together eventually with hydrogen produced by clean electricity. Operation and maintenance costs of concentrated solar power is about 2 UScent/kWh. As well as reducing electricity prices, above a certain level increasing solar power tends to stabilize them.

== Heating and hot water ==
Sales of vacuum tube hot water systems have exceeded flat-plate collectors since 2019. Vacuum tubes are more efficient for households than flat plate. Turkey is second in the world in solar water heating collector capacity after China, with about 26 million square metres generating 1.15 million tonnes of oil equivalent heat energy each year. About two-thirds is residential and a third industrial. Installed domestic hot water systems are typically convection without pumping, with 2 flat plate collectors, each nearly 2 m². Solar combi (space and water heating backed up by gas) is starting to be installed in villas and hotels.

The industry is well developed for hot water with high quality manufacturing and export capacity, but less so for space heating, and is hampered by subsidies for coal heating. A 2018 study found that solar water heating saved on average 13% energy and increased the value of properties.

In 2021 the IEA recommended that the Turkish government should support solar water heating because "technology and infrastructure quality needs to improve significantly to maximise its potential". Solar heating is also used for agriculture in Turkey, for example drying produce with solar air heaters.

== Photovoltaics ==
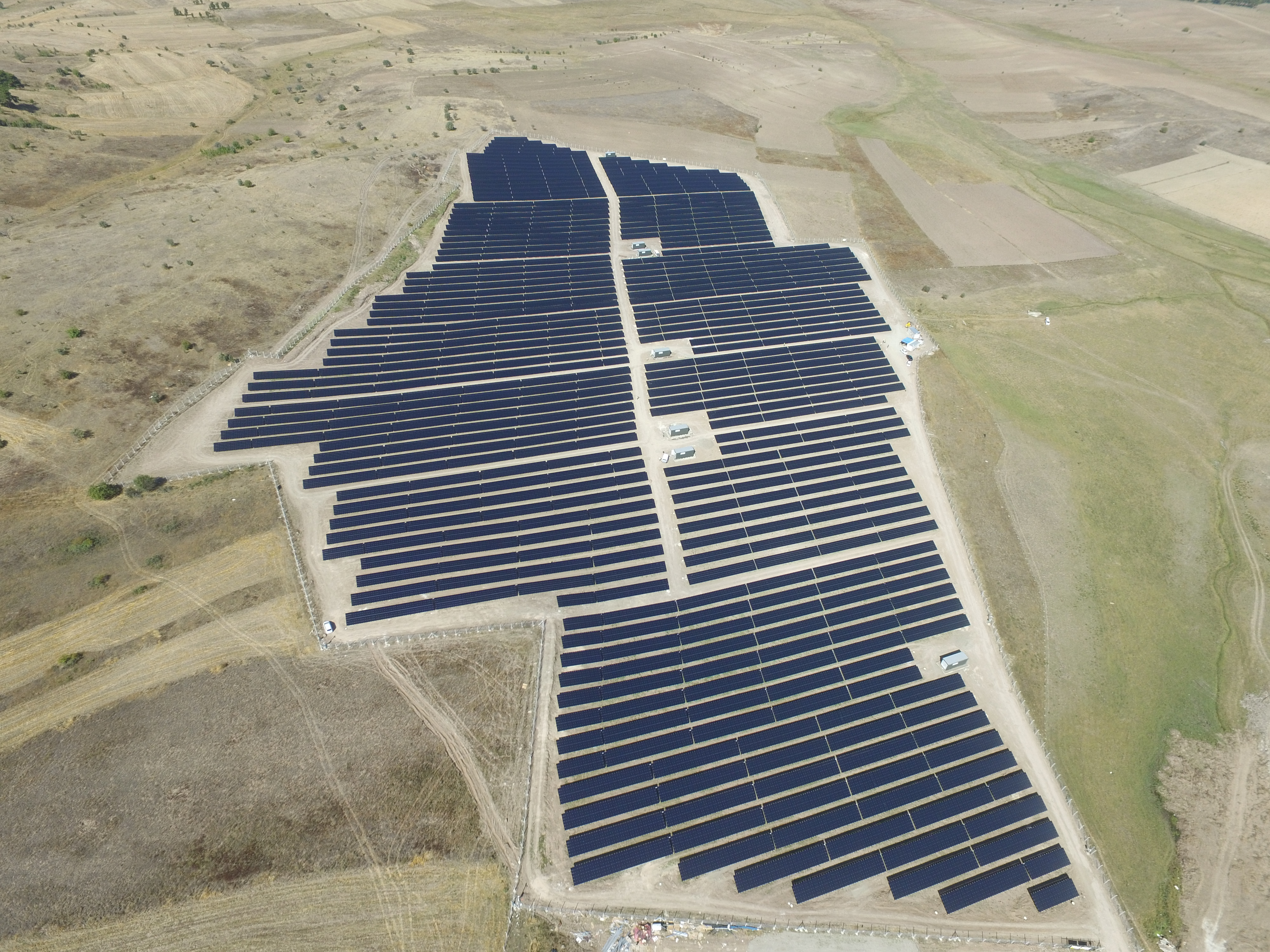
Karabük solar farm is close to researchers at Karabük University.

Photovoltaics installed capacity and production in Turkey

Photovoltaics (PV) growth was supported by the government during the 2010s. Monthly average efficiencies are from 12–17% depending on tilt and climate type; specific yield decreases with elevation. In 2020 solar cell manufacturing started in Turkey, and in 2022 Minister of Energy and Natural Resources Fatih Dönmez claimed that Turkey could assemble enough solar panels annually to produce 8 GW of power. Industry sometimes uses its own solar power for processes which need a lot of electricity, such as electrolysis. Turkey's solar capacity passed 21 GW in 2025.

The table below shows the growth of installed solar PV capacity in Turkey:

Installed solar photovoltaic capacity in Turkey
Year	Capacity (GW)
2019	6.0
2020	6.7
2021	7.8
2022	9.4
2023	11.3
2024	20
2025	25

At the end of 2025, unlicensed solar plants generating power mostly for commercial and industrial self-consumption accounted for the large majority of installed capacity, while licensed power plants made up the rest:

Turkey's solar capacity by plant type, end of 2025
Type	Capacity (MW)	Share
Unlicensed (self-consumption)	22,255	89.8%
Licensed	2,540	10.2%
Total	24,795	100%

As of 2020, unlike in the EU, obsolete solar panels are not classified as electronic waste and recycling criteria are not defined. Solar PV has been suggested at public charging stations. Turkey's greenhouse gas emissions attributable to solar PV are estimated at around 30 g Co2eq/kWh for utility scale and 30–60 g for rooftop; emissions for coal and natural gas are over 1000 g and about 400 g respectively.

=== Solar farms ===
The largest solar farm is Karapınar, which started generation in 2020 and is planned to exceed 1 GW by the end of 2022. If a solar power plant is not cleaned for a year it can lose over 5% efficiency. Environmental groups say that half of opencast mines for brown coal (lignite) in Turkey could be converted to 13 GW of solar farms (some with battery storage) generating 19 TWh per year, as much of the electrical infrastructure is already in place for the 10 GW of the 22 adjacent lignite-fired power stations. Aluminium producers favour solar as they use a lot of electricity for electrolysis.

=== Rooftop ===
As of 2022 there is about 1 GW of rooftop solar, companies are installing a lot, and the government is aiming for 2–4 GW by the early 2030s. If total electricity generated by solar panels exceeds 50% of the capacity of the local distribution transformer, no more will be approved in that area.

==== Residential ====
The limit for a household is 10 kW. The payback period is very long because electricity from the grid to householders is subsidised a lot. As of 2019, the payback period of rooftop solar with net metering for homeowners and businesses was estimated at 11 years; removal of VAT and the fixed government approval fee, and attaching borrowing for installation to the property's mortgage has been suggested to shorten this.

==== Non-residential ====
In general non-residential grid power is more expensive than residential, so the payback period is much shorter. From 2023 new buildings larger than 5,000 square meters will have to generate at least five per cent of their energy from renewables. A 2021 study in Ankara found far more rooftop potential for public and commercial buildings than residential. The study also suggested increasing technical potential by suitable roof design in new buildings. Solar PV used with heat pumps may be able to make buildings zero energy in the Mediterranean Region. Aluminium producer Tosyalı claimed in 2022 to be installing the world's largest rooftop solar power system on the roofs of its buildings.

=== Floating solar ===
Floating solar is allowed up to 30% of a reservoir’s minimum level.

=== Agriculture ===
Farmers are financially supported to install solar panels, for example to power irrigation pumps, and can sell some electricity. Agrivoltaics has been suggested as suitable for wheat, maize and some other shade-loving vegetables. Hybrid solar and biogas has been suggested, for example on dairy farms. Rainwater harvesting has been suggested.

== Alternatives to photovoltaics ==
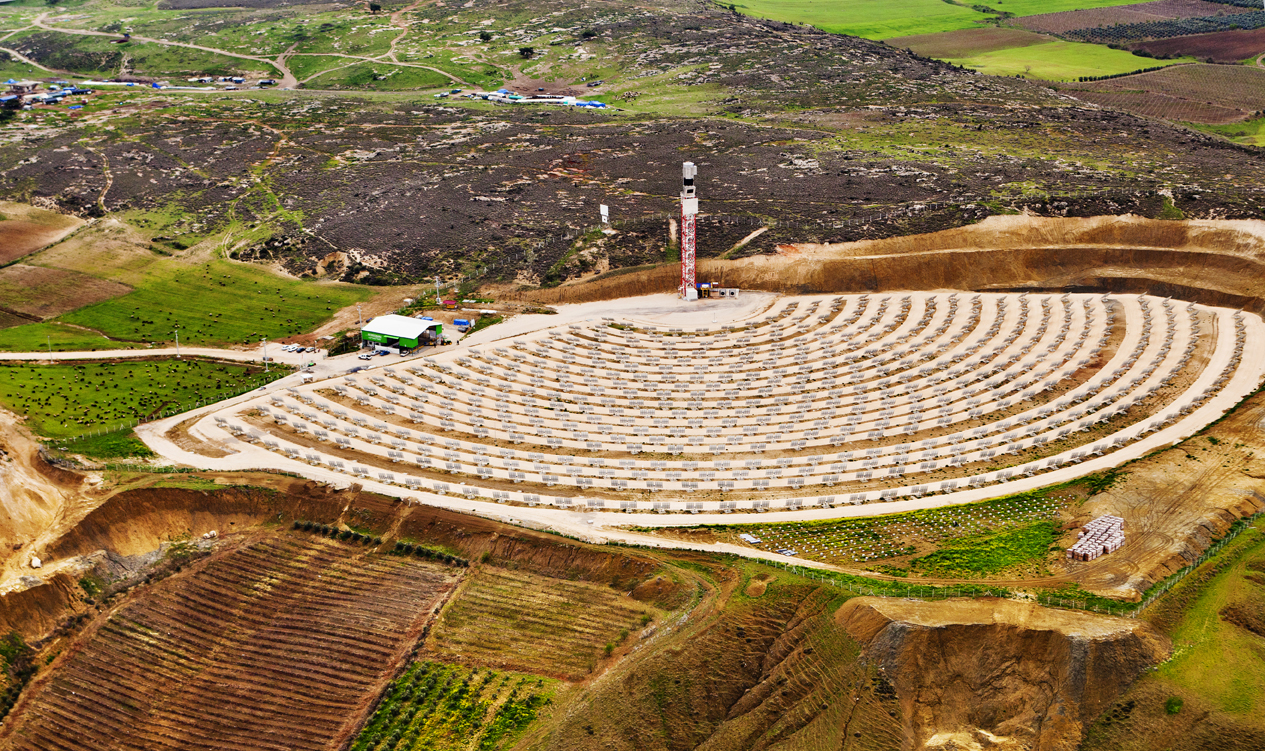
Greenway in Mersin is the only solar power tower in the country.

Turkey's first solar power tower, the Greenway CSP Mersin Solar Tower Plant in Mersin, was constructed in 2013 and has an installed power of 5 MW. A solar updraft tower has been suggested for Antalya Province.

== See also ==
- Renewable energy in Turkey
- Wind power in Turkey
- Geothermal power in Turkey
