= Renewable energy in Turkey =

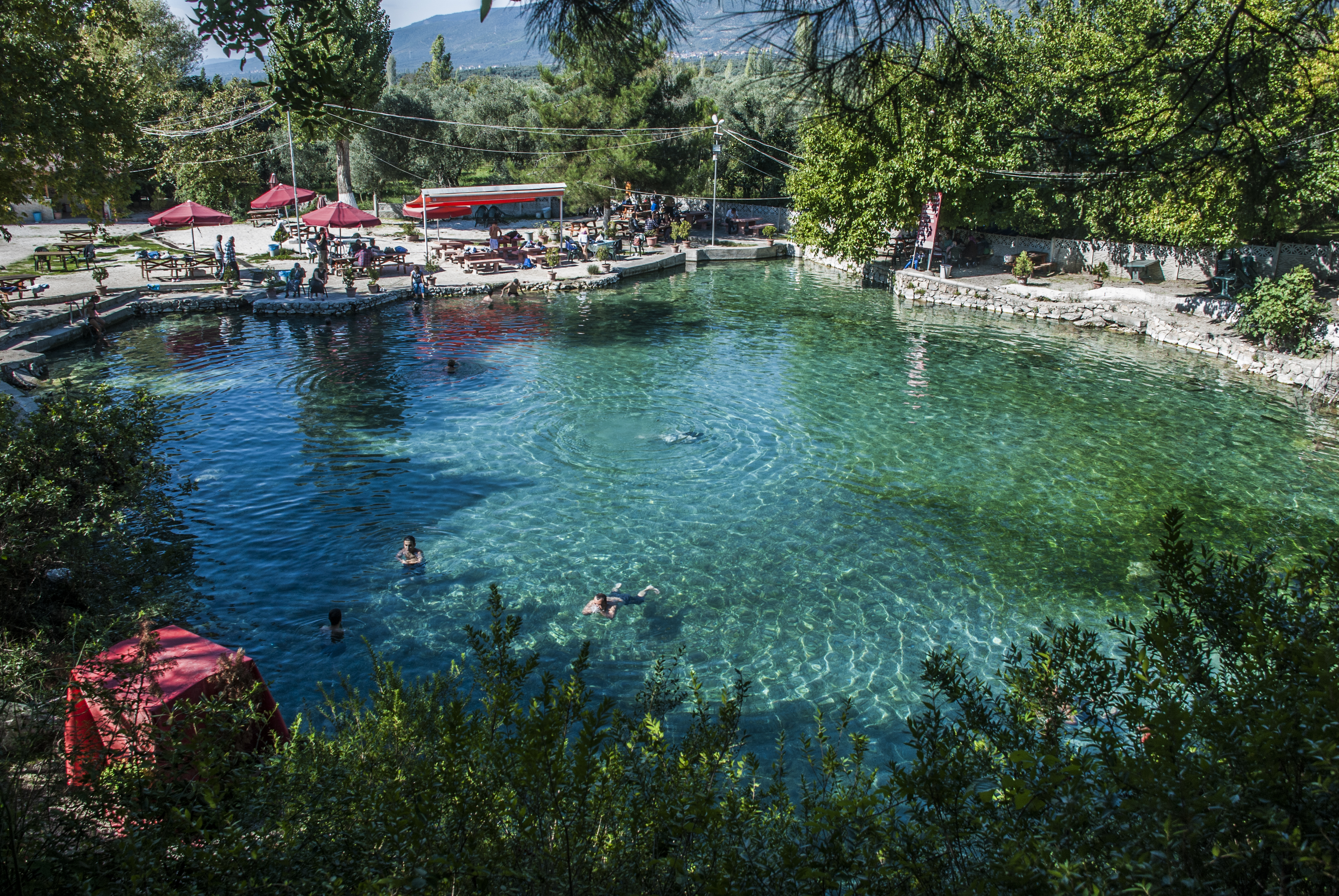
Geothermally heated spa in Keramet, Orhangazi

Slightly under a quarter of energy is renewable

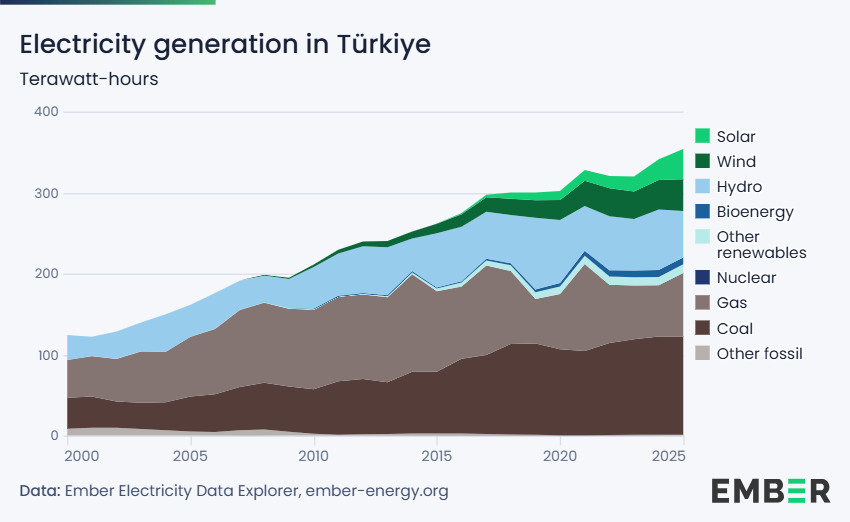
Wind and solar electricity generation is increasing slowly, but renewables still total less than coal and gas. Gas generation makes up for hydropower during drought years.

Renewables supply a quarter of energy in Turkey, including heat and electricity. Hot water from underground warms many spas and greenhouses, and some houses have rooftop solar water heating. In parts of the west hot rocks are shallow enough to generate electricity as well as heat. Wind turbines, also mainly near western cities and industry, generate a tenth of Turkey’s electricity. Hydropower, mostly from dams in the east, is the only modern renewable energy which is fully exploited. Hydropower averages about a fifth of the country's electricity, but much less in drought years. Apart from wind and hydro, other renewables; such as geothermal, solar and biogas; together generated almost a tenth of Turkey’s electricity in 2022. Over half the installed capacity for electricity generation is renewables.

Turkey has a long history of wood burning, windmills, and bathing in hot springs. Many dams were built from the mid-20th to early 21st century, but some say that governments have not allowed civil society enough influence on energy policy, leading to protests against building dams, geothermal power plants, and at least one wind farm. Despite Turkey’s sunny climate solar power is underdeveloped. As the electricity system is already flexible increasing to 70% renewables is easily feasible.Solar power could be expanded more quickly if the electricity grid was improved faster and energy policy revised, especially by abolishing fossil fuel subsidies.

Many hybrid power plants are planned, and batteries are being integrated. Companies with a lot of renewables include the state electricity generation company (mainly hydro), Aydem, and Kalyon. If renewables could help phase-out coal by 2030, instead of by the national net zero greenhouse gas emissions target year of 2053, that would have significant health benefits and reduce inflation in Turkey. As of 2022 renewables are not sufficient to meet that target year. Various electric vehicles are being manufactured, which will use some of the increased renewable generation and help reduce air pollution. As of 2024, renewables made up 44% of Turkey's electrical power production, consisting of 22% hydro, 8% solar, 11% wind, and 3% other. They are important for the country’s energy security.

== Sources of renewable energy ==
=== Solar power ===
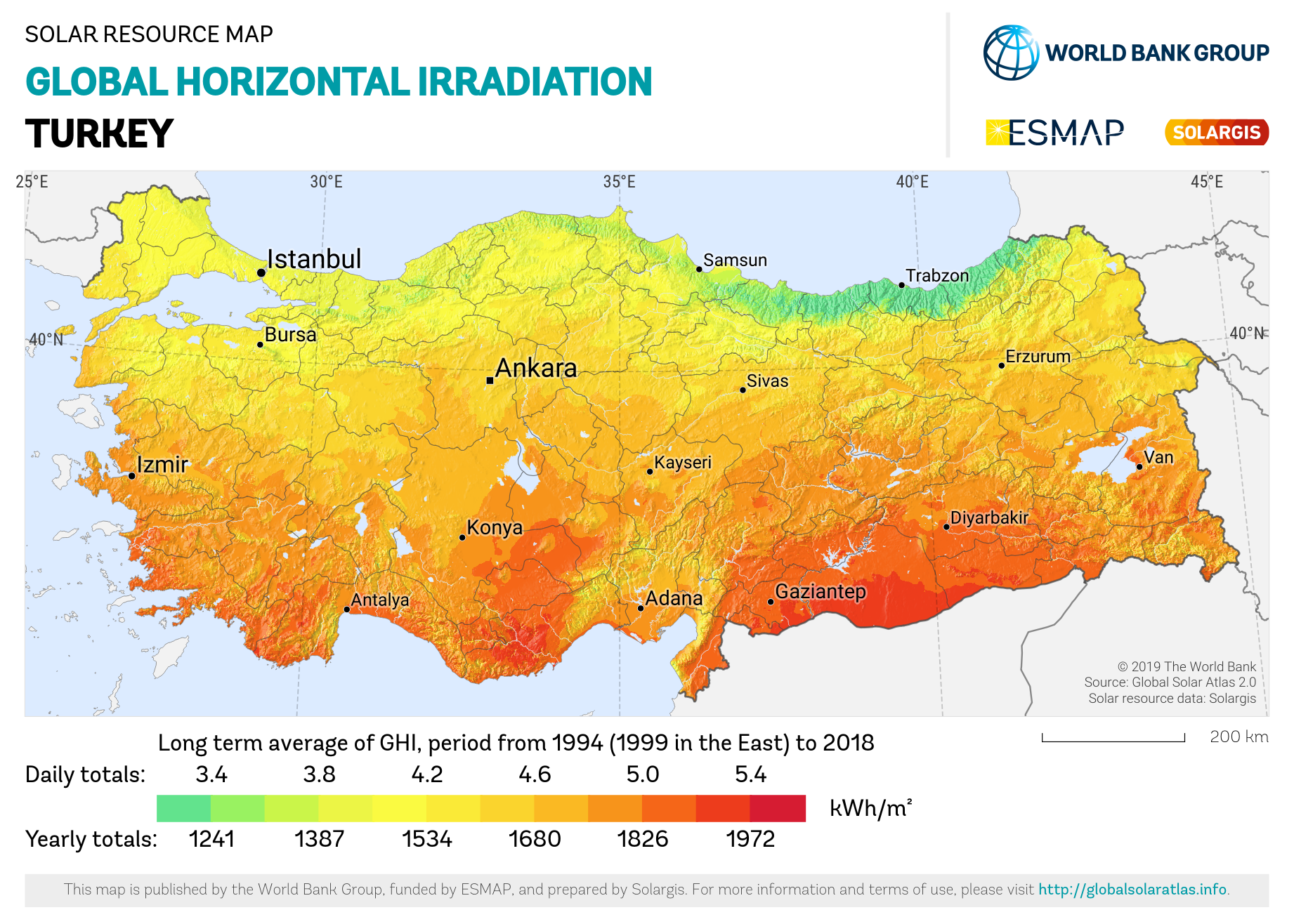
Solar irradiation map of Turkey

Solar power suits Turkey's climate, especially in the South Eastern Anatolia and Mediterranean regions. Solar power is a growing part of renewable energy in the country, with almost 25 gigawatts (GW) of solar panels in 2025, of which 22 GW is commercial and industry rather than traditional power companies or residential rooftop solar as in many other countries. It generates 6% of the country's electricity. Solar thermal is also important.

Despite its similar suitability to solar power, Turkey has installed far less solar power than Spain. Solar power is the cheapest source of power and subsidizes coal and fossil gas power. Every gigawatt of solar power installed would save over US$100 million on gas import costs, and more of the country's electricity might be exported.

Most new solar power is tendered as part of hybrid power plants. Building new solar power plants would be cheaper than running existing import-dependent coal plants if they were not subsidized. However, think tank Ember has listed several obstacles to building utility-scale solar plants, such as insufficient new grid capacity for solar power at transformers, a 50 MW cap for any single solar power plant's installed capacity, and large consumers not allowed to sign long-term power purchase agreements for new solar installations. Ember says there is technical potential for 120 GW of rooftop solar, almost 10 times 2023 capacity, which they say could generate 45% of the country's 2022 demand.

=== Wind power ===
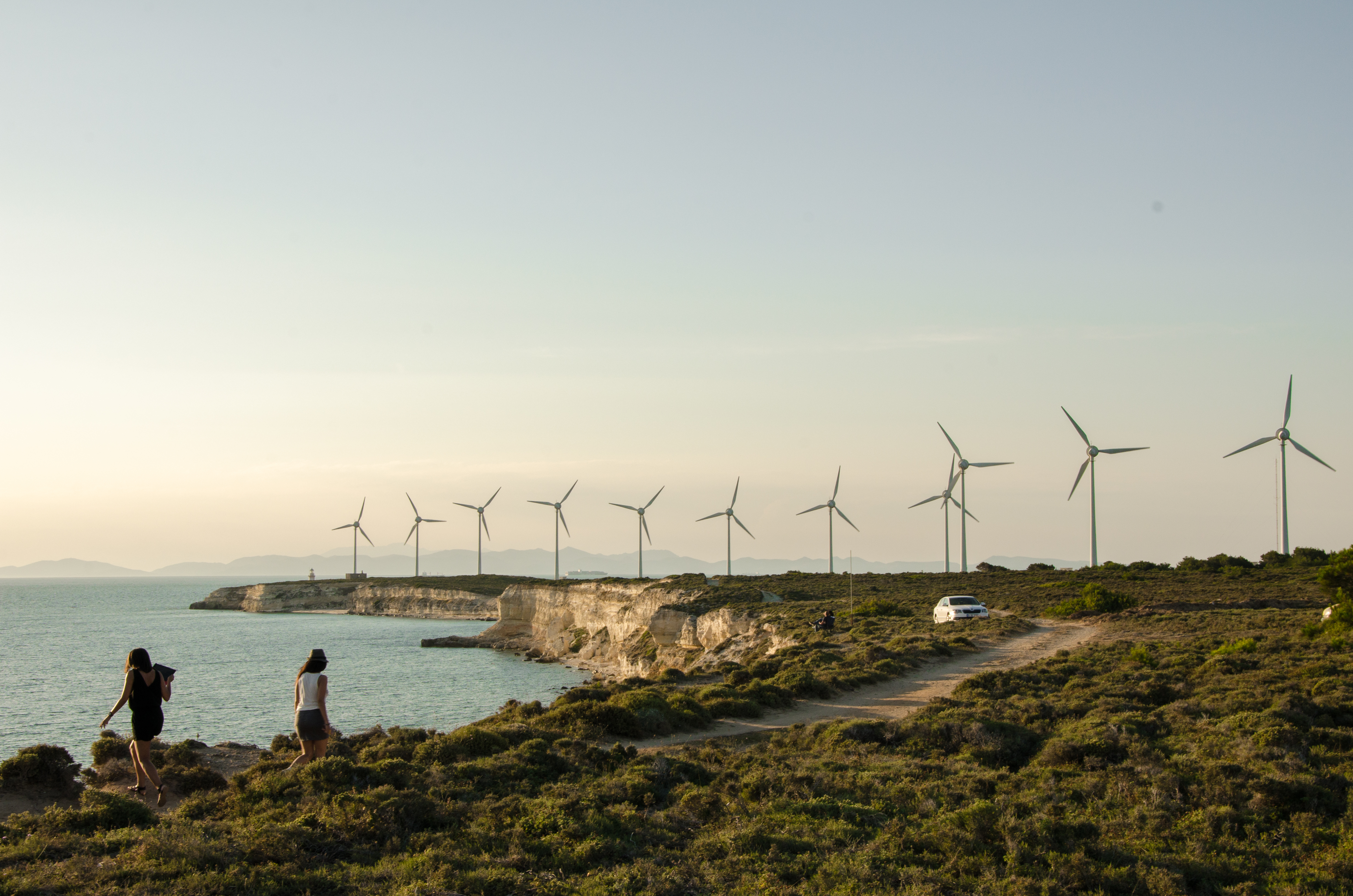
Wind turbines on the island of Bozcaada in the far west

Wind power installed capacity and generation in Turkey

Wind power generates about 10% of Turkey's electricity, mainly in the west in the Aegean and Marmara regions, and is gradually becoming a larger share of renewable energy in the country. As of 2025, Turkey has over 13 gigawatts (GW) of wind turbines. The Energy Ministry plans to have almost 30 GW by 2035, including 5 GW offshore.

In 2021, the state-owned Electricity Generation Company (EÜAŞ) had about 20% of the market, and there were many private companies. The highest ever daily share of wind power was 25%, in 2022.

Building new wind farms is cheaper than running existing coal plants which depend on imported coal. According to modelling by Carbon Tracker in 2020, new wind will be cheaper than all existing coal plants by 2027.

=== Hydroelectricity ===
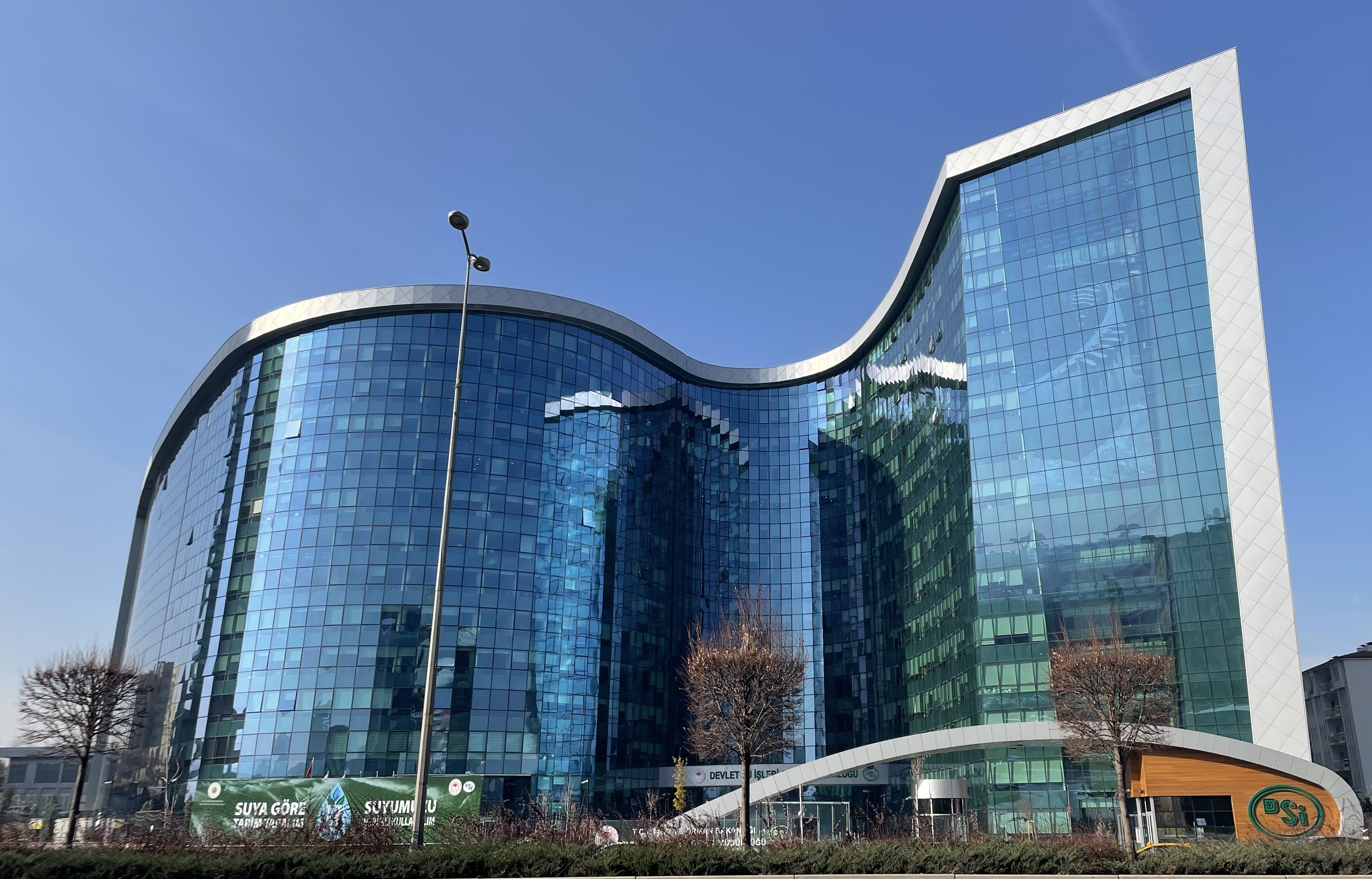
State Hydraulic Works headquarters in Ankara

Hydroelectricity is a major source of electricity in Turkey, due to its mountainous landscape and many rivers. The country's main river basins are the Euphrates and Tigris. Over 700 hydropower plants have been built, and they make up about 30% of the country's electricity generating capacity. Annual generation varies greatly, (Note: For example, drought in 2020 caused a generation drop of over 10% compared to the previous year.) and in rainy years lots of hydroelectric power can be generated. Government policies have generally supported building dams, but some are controversial in neighbouring countries, and some raise concerns about damage to the environment and wildlife.

In 2021, 56 terawatt-hours of hydroelectricity was generated, which was 17% of Turkey's total electrical generation, from 31 GW of capacity. When there is drought in Turkey during the peak demand for electricity in July or August, the aim of the State Hydraulic Works to conserve water for irrigation or drinking can conflict with the Turkish Electricity Transmission Corporation's goal of generating electricity, and water supply is prioritised. Although Turkey's energy strategy may change in the future, due to climate change causing more frequent droughts, hydropower is predicted to remain important for load balancing with solar and wind power. However little new capacity is expected to be built, as the Energy Ministry says hydropower has reached its limit. Converting existing dams to pumped storage has been suggested as more suitable than building new pumped storage.

=== Geothermal energy ===
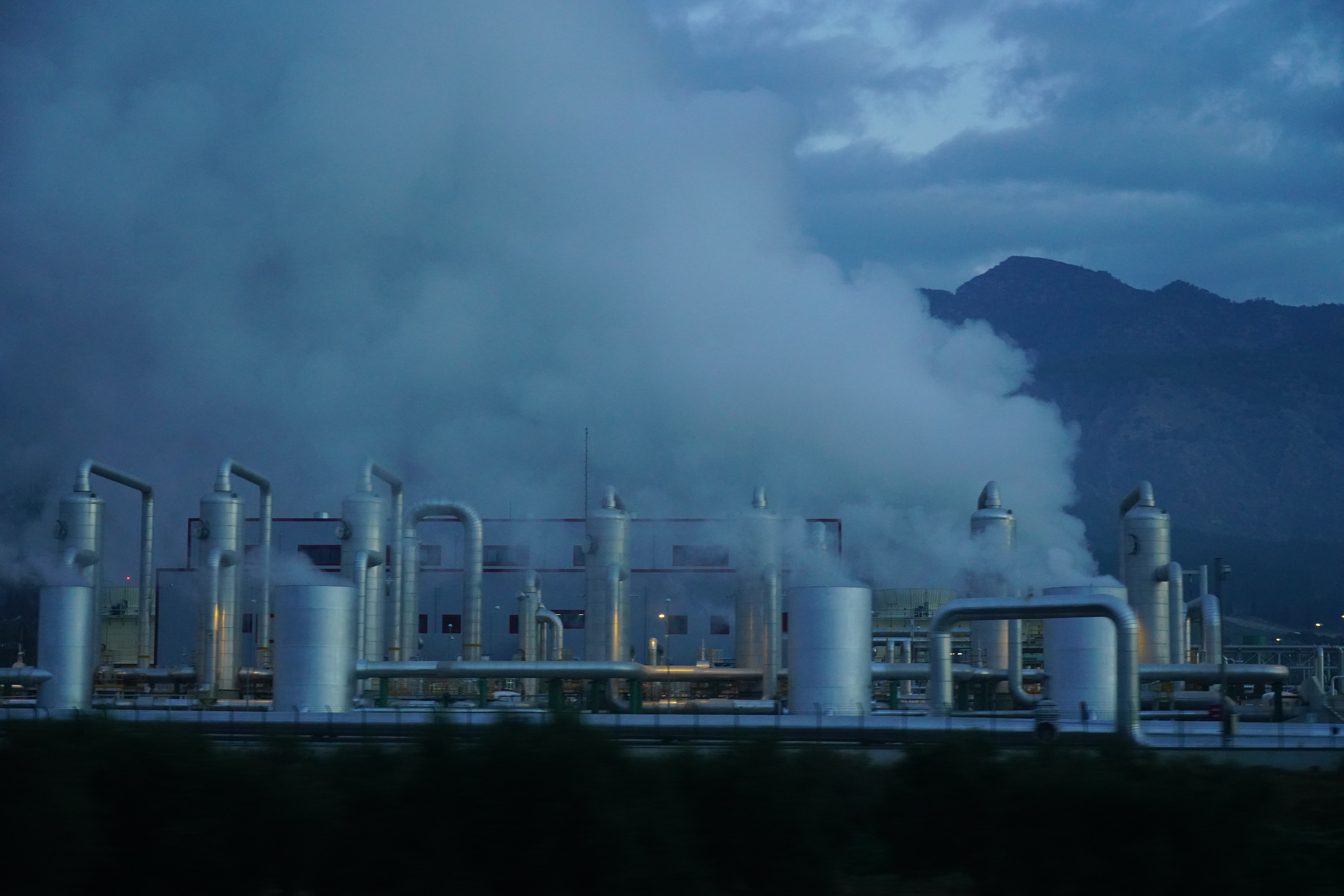
Kızıldere geothermal power plant in Denizli Province. All of Turkey's geothermal plants are in the west of the country.

Geothermal energy is a significant part of renewable energy in Turkey: it is used for geothermal heating and generates 3% of the nation's electricity. Turkey is the world's second largest user of geothermal heating, after China. Many greenhouses, spas and homes are heated by underground water; and many more buildings could be heated in this way.

People have been bathing in hot springs since antiquity. In Turkey electricity from underground steam was first generated in the late 20th century, and 63 geothermal power plants operate in Turkey as of 2022. Turkey has almost 2 GW of geothermal power installed, the fourth largest in the world. All geothermal plants are in Western Anatolia, due to its favorable geology. There is potential for 5 GW of geothermal power in total, including enhanced geothermal systems.

Carbon dioxide emissions from new geothermal power plants are high in Turkey, as the metamorphic rocks can release carbon, but the emission rate declines over a few years. Public opinion is sometimes against geothermal due to emissions of foul smelling hydrogen sulfide. To reduce the emission of both carbon dioxide and hydrogen sulfide, the fluid is sometimes completely reinjected back into the reservoir.

=== Bioenergy ===
Bioenergy forms a small part of the Turkish energy sector. There is unrealised potential to generate bioenergy using waste from the country's vast agricultural sector and forest resources. The possibility of expanding biogas, biofuel and bioethanol production and use has been suggested to supplement Turkey's energy needs, reduce dependency on fossil fuel imports and cut greenhouse gas emissions.

== Hybrid projects, storage and integration ==
Solar is often added to existing power plants, such as geothermal, hydro, and wind. A solar and biomass hybrid is also feasible. Up to 15% of the existing installed capacity can be added without requiring a new licence, provided generation does not exceed that limit, although the extra capacity cannot receive a USD subsidy. There is a virtual power plant which operates with geothermal, wind, solar and hydro. Combining wind and/or solar with storage is also popular. Increasing Turkey's proportion of electric cars in use to 10% by 2030 would help integrate variable electricity.

Transmission and distribution cables are at medium risk from earthquakes and transformers at high risk whereas solar is low risk: Think tank Shura suggests that microgrids of solar and batteries could increase resilience against earthquakes.

== Future ==
Wind, and especially solar, could supply much more energy in Turkey. It is estimated that over half of electricity generation could be from renewables by 2026, but Turkey has invested less in solar and wind power than similar Mediterranean countries. More renewable energy could be used to reduce the nation's greenhouse gas emissions, and thus avoid paying other countries' carbon tariffs. Turkey is a net exporter of wind power equipment, but a net importer of solar power equipment. Total non-hydro renewables overtook hydro in 2021. Solar is expected to overtake wind before 2030. The Energy Minister said in 2023 that by 2035 renewables would supply almost a quarter of the nation’s energy. According to one study, by massively increasing solar power in the south and wind power in the west the country's entire electricity demand could be met from renewable sources.

A 2022 simulation by Shura of typical spring 2030 generation shows that wind and nuclear could provide baseload, and solar much of daytime demand, reserving dammed hydro for evening flexibility. Other experts believe that nuclear power will keep the grid stable from fluctuations in variable renewable energy, while some state that more geothermal baseload capacity should be added.

Think tank Ember said in 2022 that Turkey needs to expand renewables at least twice as fast, to decarbonize the electricity sector and lower import bills. In 2023 they said that solar power rollout should be accelerated in the sunny south. Shura states that renewables could generate 70% of electricity by 2030, with coal reduced to 5%. Many new 400kV transmission lines are planned to be built by 2030.

The national energy plan published in 2022 expects an increase in the share of renewable energy and intermittent renewable energy sources in electricity generation to 55% and 34% respectively by 2035. According to the plan by 2035 installed capacity will increase to: 30 GW (25 GW onshore, 5 GW offshore) of wind power, and 53 GW of solar power. The plan is for installed capacity to increase to 35 GW of hydroelectricity and 5 GW total of geothermal and biomass power. The plan expects the share of renewable energy in primary energy consumption, which was 16.7% in 2020, to increase to 23.7% by 2035. The plan expects the share of electricity from variable renewable energy, which was 12% in 2020, to increase gradually to 34% by 2035.

== Economics ==
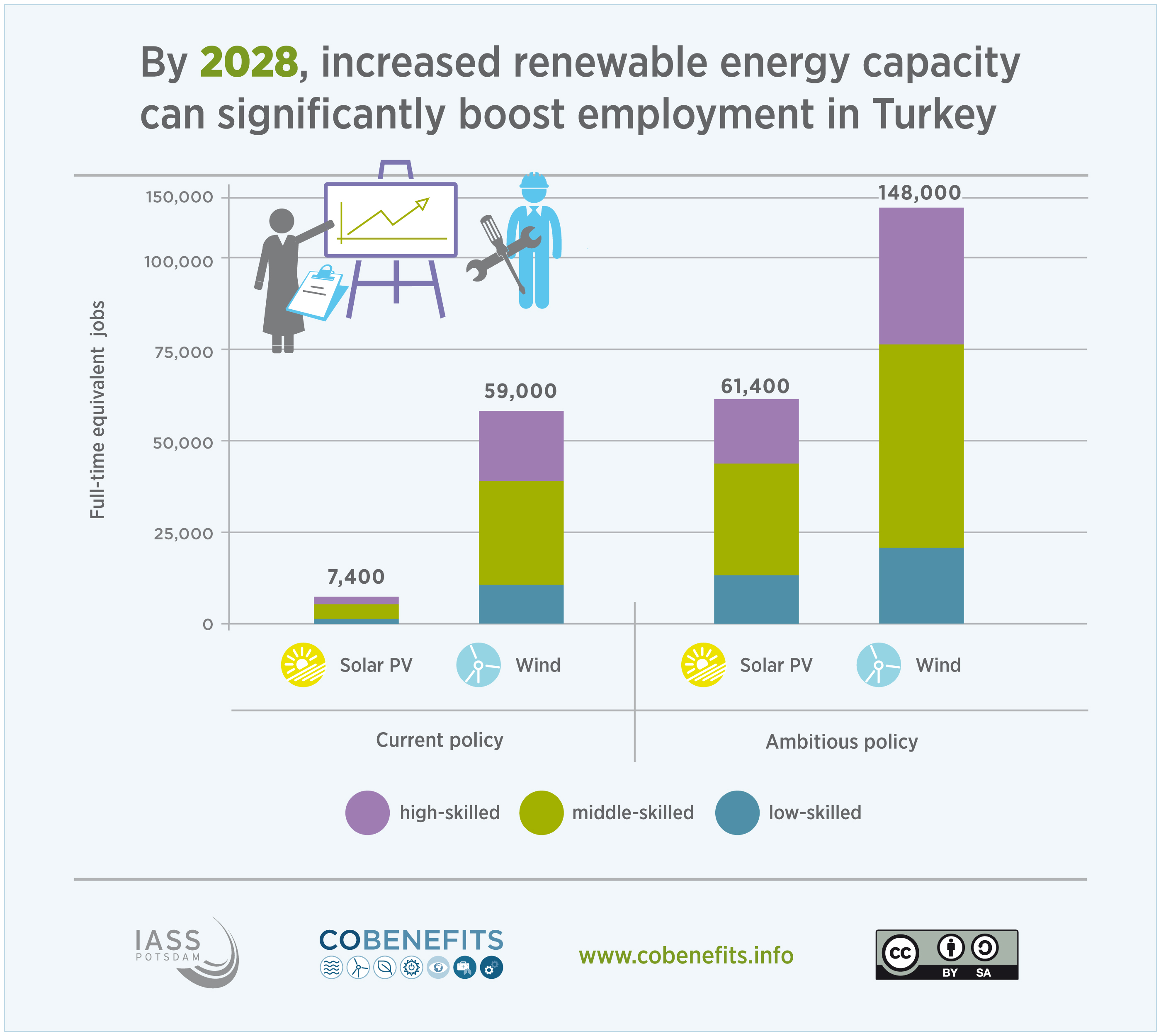
According to studies a coal-phase out in favour of renewable energy would increase employment.

The fuel-only cost of fossil gas-fired power in early 2022 was 128 USD/MWh, which was more than double that of the levelized cost of electricity of new utility scale solar PV and new onshore wind. Renewable energy is competitive with domestic coal. However in 2022 wind and solar remained more expensive than energy efficiency measures, which were estimated at 14 USD/MWh.

There are feed-in-tariffs in lira (but partly adjusted to USD) per kWh depending on the source and there may be extra if local components are used. Geothermal and pumped storage get 15 years of this YEKDEM. Otherwise tariffs apply for 10 years and any local bonus for 5 years, and are revised quarterly. Although feed-in tariffs continue to 2030 investors are concerned about the volatility of the lira.

Following the invasion of Ukraine in early 2022 the cost of imported fuel soared and the Energy Market Regulatory Authority (EMRA) was empowered to intervene in the electricity market. According to the Industrial Development Bank of Turkey, the support fee based on source model depends on transferring money from low-cost solar, wind and hydroelectric power plants to those with high operating expenses, examples of which include imported coal and natural gas. Despite some renewables generators calling for it to be scrapped, it was extended into 2023. This applies to both the market exchange price and fixed prices determined by bilateral agreements. EMRA determining such fees has been criticised by some lawyers, who say that the fees are like a tax on low cost generators, and that according to the constitution taxes can only be imposed by parliament.

The World Bank said in 2022 that "the war in Ukraine and attendant energy supply disruptions and price increases highlight risks for countries like Türkiye that rely on fossil fuel imports, underscoring the urgency of climate action in support of energy security and affordability" and proposed a plan to integrate development with action on climate change.

Türkiye can achieve energy security through an accelerated pace of least-cost investments in domestic solar and wind—building on its track record of tripling renewable energy capacity in the last decade—and investing in energy efficiency, battery and pumped storage, geothermal, and gas generation with carbon capture and storage (as well as completion of the nuclear plant under construction). This would enable the country to meet a doubling of energy demand by 2053 to fuel its growth ambitions, with the added benefit of lowering emissions and improving energy security by reducing reliance on imported coal, gas, and oil.

— World Bank, Türkiye - Country Climate and Development Report, page 8

Earlier reports from other organisations say that such an expansion of renewables benefits employment, industrial production, and balance of trade.

A 2022 study by Ember in advance of the Energy Ministry long-term plan suggested that dependence on imported energy could be reduced from a half to a quarter by 2030 by energy efficiency and increasing solar capacity to 40 GW and wind to 30 GW: this would mean the increase in wind and solar accelerating from 1 GW a year each to 2.5 and 4 GW respectively. They said that domestic solar manufacturing capacity could achieve 8 GW a year. The report was based on 4 modeling studies by: the Istanbul Policy Center, the World Bank’s Climate and Development report, a report from Europe Beyond Coal and other local environmental organizations, and analysis from Turkish energy transition think tank Shura. In 2023 Shura estimated that doubling the capacity of wind and solar compared to 2022 would cut the wholesale cost of electricity by a quarter.

If more renewable energy is generated it may be possible to export green hydrogen to the EU. Another example of such “sector coupling” would be using excess renewable energy for desalination. Eser Özdil at the Atlantic Council said in 2022 that interconnectors with the EU need to be greatly increased, and suggested joint electricity projects with Balkan companies. A green tariff has been offered since 2021. Companies with a lot of renewables include the state electricity generation company (mainly hydro), Aydem, and Kalyon.

Increasing export of electricity to the EU has also been proposed but analyst Kadri Taştan pointed out that this depends on "reliable and solid political relations between the two and an ambitious environmental policy in Turkey". Using renewable electricity to produce green hydrogen for export has also been suggested, but would require substantial investment. The 60% import tariff on Chinese components has been criticised as favouring large companies over SMEs. As of 2023 Chinese companies consider Turkey high risk, in part due to unpredictable and changeable regulations. SMEs buy solar parts from Malaysia due to the trade agreement.

== Regulations ==
Unlicensed (about 2% of supply and over 90% of which is solar) generators must apply to distribution companies or industrial park license holders in their region for technical checks and approval. Production could increase far more quickly if subsidies for coal were abolished and the auction system was improved. In 2022 the Unlicensed Electricity Generation Regulation was amended so that the amount of surplus energy that can be sold may not exceed the total consumption of the consumer the previous year: the excess goes to the Renewable Energy Resources Support Mechanism. This regulation might be unconstitutional by being retrospective.

== Politics ==
The Turkish Electricity Industry Association has suggested a taxonomy, including investments in renewable energy, based on the EU taxonomy for sustainable activities. Some academics say that governments have not allowed civil society enough say on energy policy, leading to protests against building hydropower, geothermal power, and at least one wind farm. In 2022 the EU complained about local content requirements, saying that they did not meet World Trade Organization and European Union–Turkey Customs Union rules. Think tank Shura says that renewables could replace coal power by 2035. Better co-operation between city government and central government has been suggested.

== Health ==
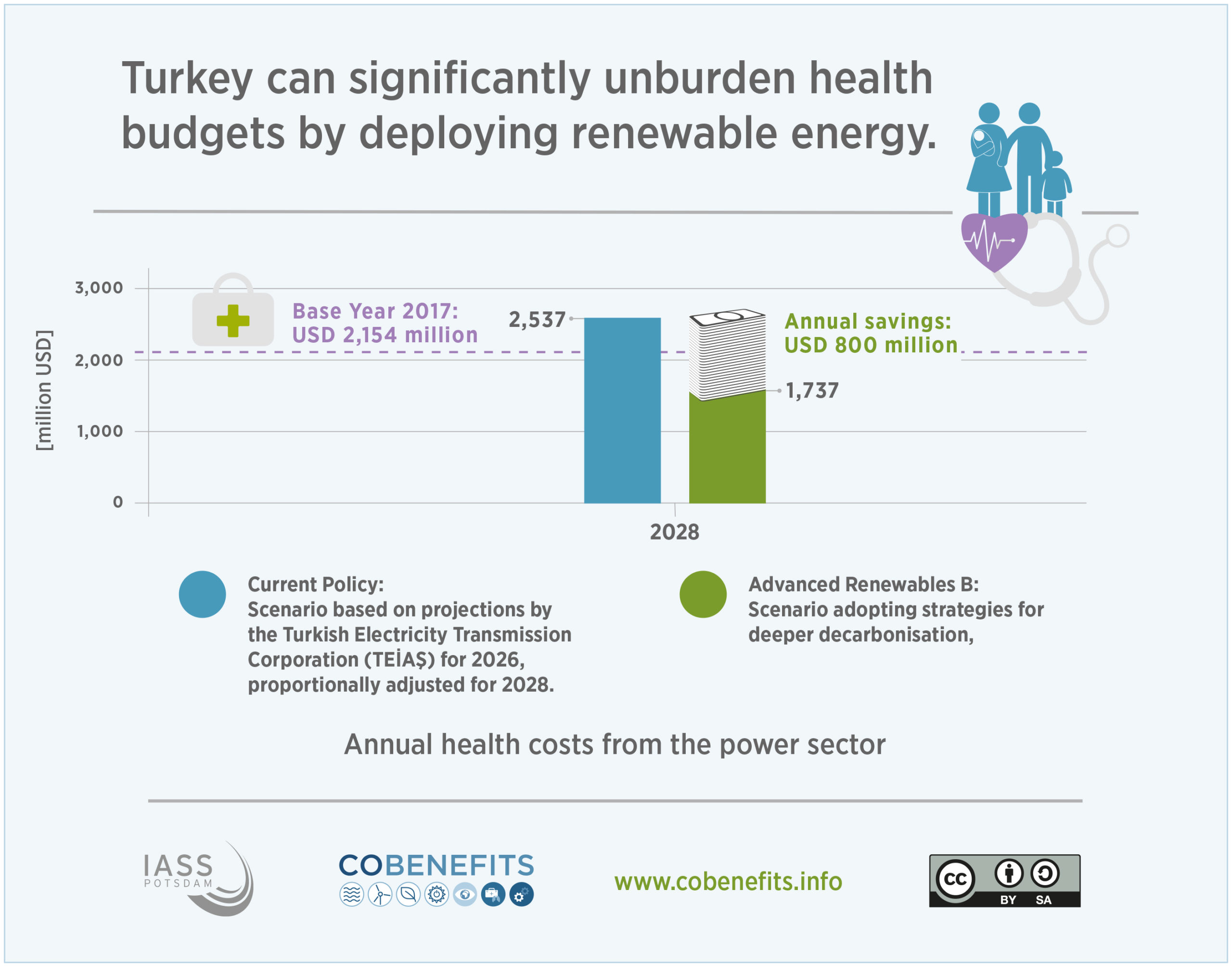
Renewable energy reduces health costs in Turkey.

Geothermal power in Turkey is used mainly for heating, and solar water heating is also widespread. However, burning wood for home heating (classified as "traditional biomass" within academic reports) has been causing indoor air pollution throughout history, and still poses such problems.

Possible health benefits of expanding modern renewable energy have been estimated at US$800 million a year. Health benefits could be greater if renewables succeeded in phasing out coal by 2030.

== History ==
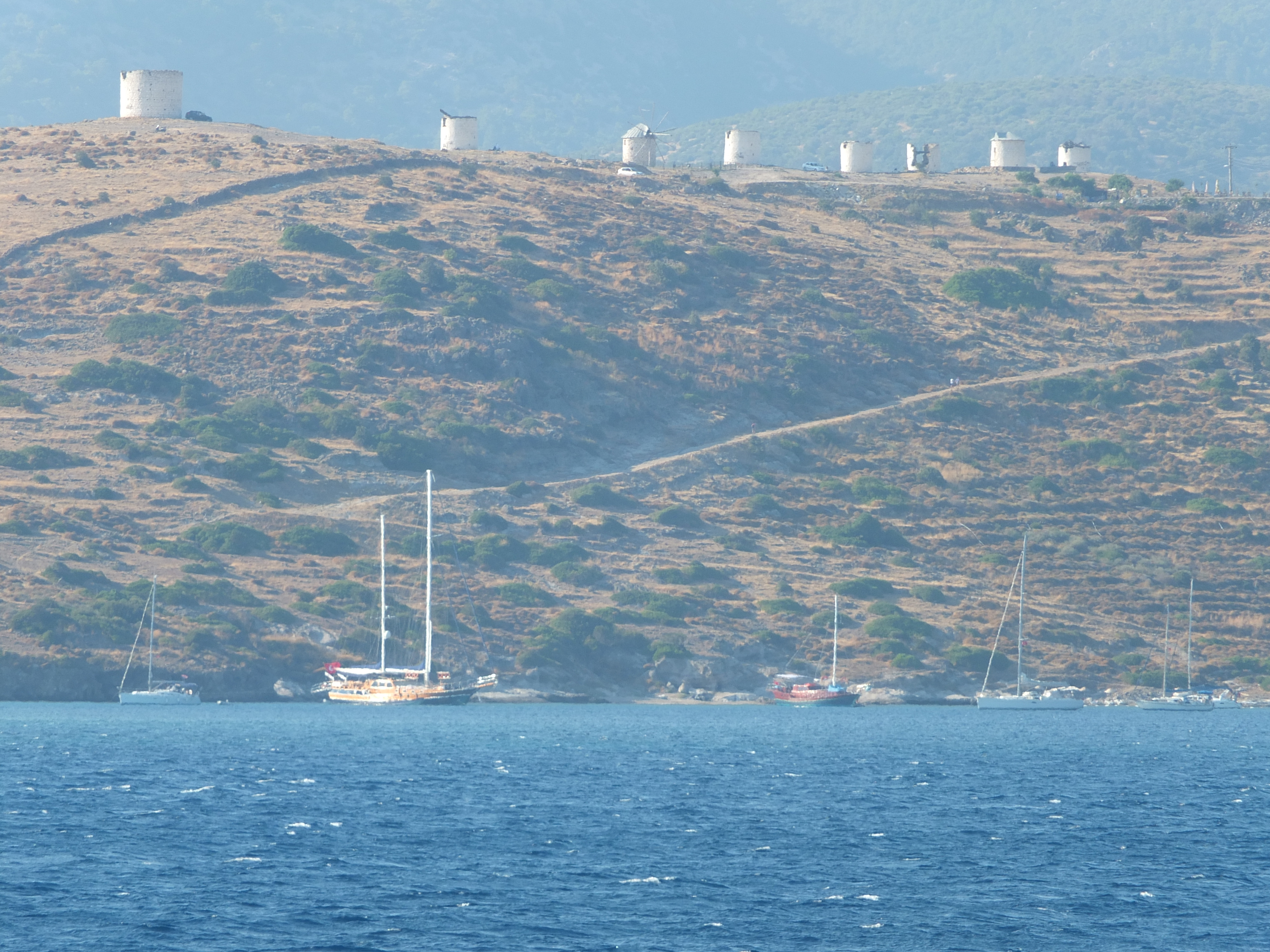
Bodrum windmills

Neolithic people in the Fertile Crescent burnt dung. The use of wood as "traditional biomass" in pre-republican times particularly affected Turkish forests in central and southeast Anatolia, whereas forests in coastal regions proved somewhat more renewable because these regions receive more precipitation. Due to deforestation in arid regions, poor communities continued to burn dry dung in some remote villages into the late 20th century. In the early 21st century wood was the major source of energy in rural areas.

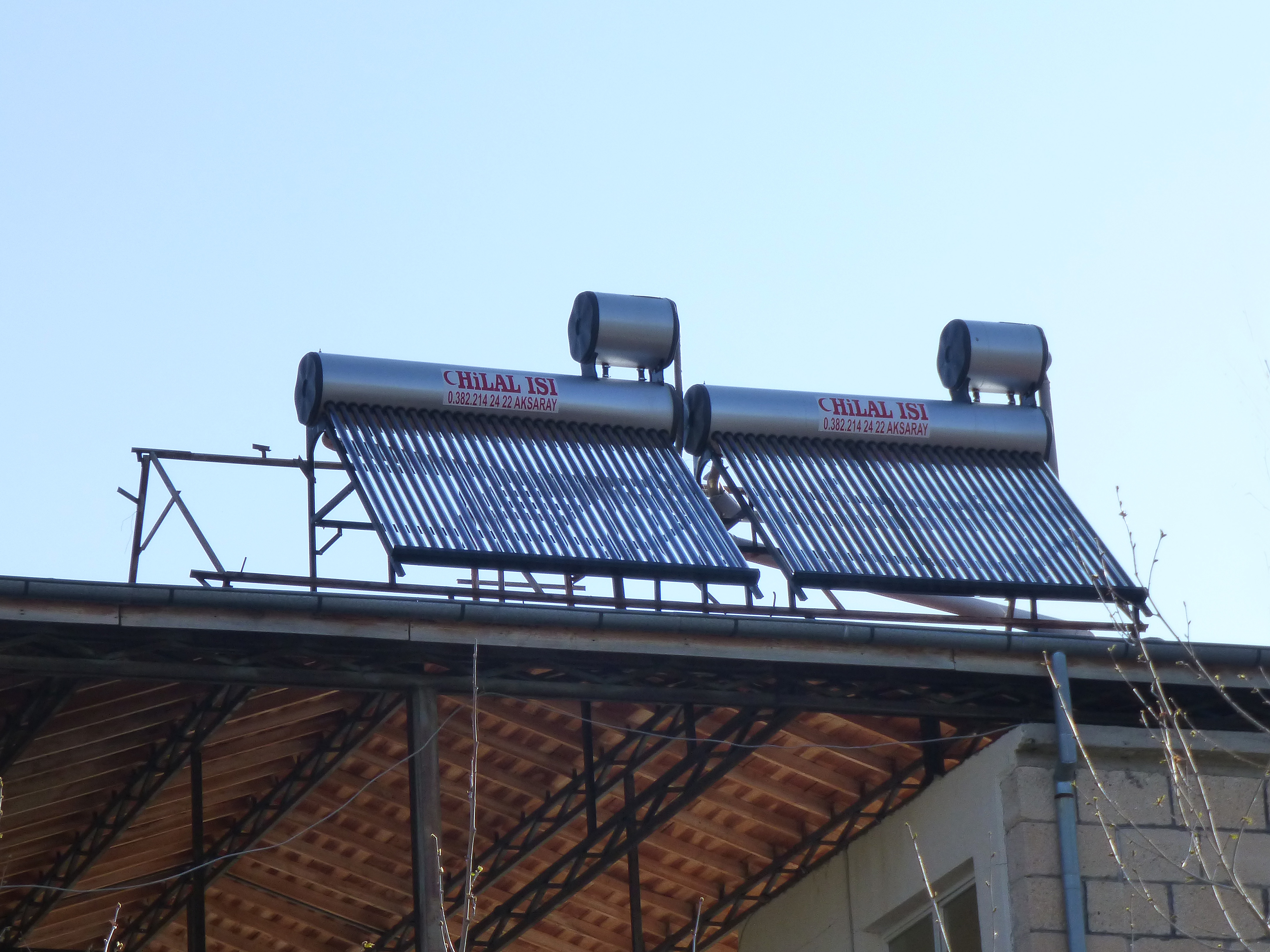
Many rooftop solar water heaters were installed in the late 20th and early 21st centuries

In late 20th century, biogas became the focus of much research. The first residential heat pump was installed at the turn of the century. Geothermal heat and solar heat were developed early. Hydropower was expanded for many decades with geothermal, wind and solar electricity following. Although there has been some academic research on solar houses since the 1970s this has been criticised as insufficient given the importance of the construction industry.

== See also ==
- Energy conservation in Turkey
- Greenhouse gas emissions by Turkey
