= Bioenergy in Turkey =

Bioenergy forms a small part of the Turkish energy sector. There is unrealised potential to generate bioenergy using waste from the country's vast agricultural sector and forest resources. The possibility of expanding biogas, biofuel and bioethanol production and use has been suggested to supplement Turkey's energy needs, reduce dependency on fossil fuel imports and cut greenhouse gas emissions.

== Overview ==
Turkey is highly dependent on fossil fuels for its energy needs, contributing to increasing greenhouse gas emissions and raising concerns over energy security. Since 1980, Turkey has considered using biomass for energy and heating, and in the 2010s included a biomass component in its target of achieving 20% renewable energy by 2023. The economic biomass potential of Turkey is 32 million tons of oil equivalent (Mtoe)/year. Total biomass production is estimated to reach 52.5 Mtoe by 2030. An estimated 6.5 million homes in Turkey use biomass as their main source of heating fuel.

Waste from the country's vast agricultural sector has potential as a source of heat and energy, and could reduce dependency on foreign fuel imports. Bio-waste from Marmara Region has potential to generate almost half its energy needs. The country's rich forest resources have also been proposed as a source of renewable bioenergy.Forest residues (wood chips and pellets) from industrial activities are also a potential source of biomass - their use in energy generation could reduce Turkeys' greenhouse gas emissions by 1.5% and save $0.5 billion annually by reducing the need for fossil fuel imports. Sources of biomass energy include grain dust, wheat straw, and hazelnut shell. Biomass as an energy source is advantageous due to its ability to be readily available all year round.

Tupraş intends to make sustainable aviation fuel. The Shura Energy Transition Centre in Istanbul suggests that Bioenergy with carbon capture and storage can remove residual greenhouse gas emissions after net zero in 2053.

There are drawbacks to using biomass as energy in Turkey. These include but are not limited to: availability (seasonally and geographically), production (based on climate conditions), and cost of transportation. Overall, the cost of biomass waste varies depending on Turkey's economic status and crop production. As of 2022 there are no reliable production or export statistics.

== Biogas ==
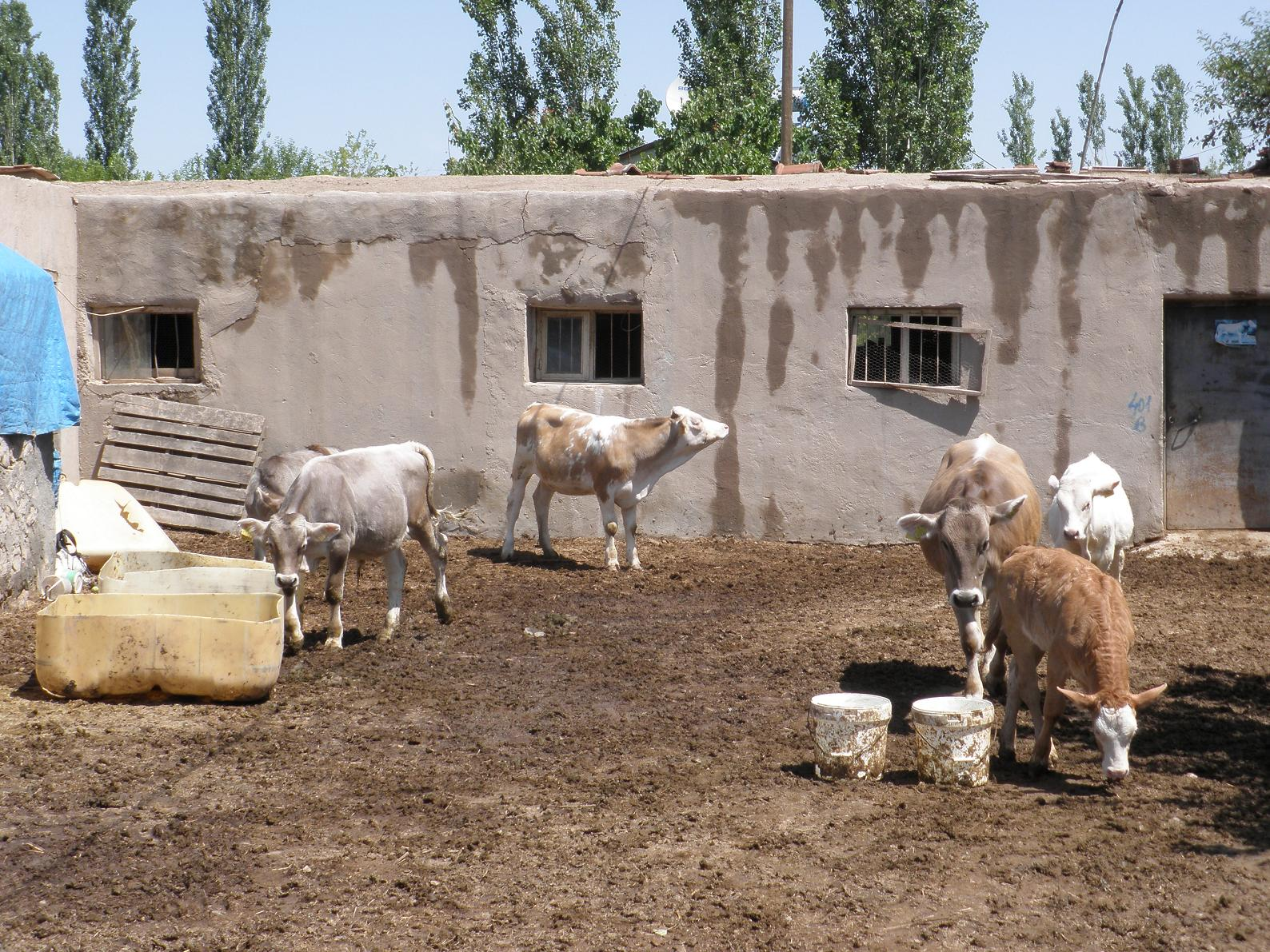
Manure from animal agriculture in Turkey has potential to generate significant biogas for energy.

There is significant biogas generation potential in Turkey. More than eighty five million tons of animal waste is produced annually in Turkey. This could be used to produce over 1.8 million tons of oil equivalent (toe). With plant waste included the potential raises to over 5.3 million tons of oil equivalent (toe). A 2022 study estimated the country's biogas potential at 7 billion m^{3} per year. However, only 85 biogas facilities with 36 plants are currently in operation in Turkey. Eastern and Central Anatolia have the greatest potential for electricity generation from animal waste. The world's largest landfill gas power plant began operating in 2020 in Istanbul.

== Biofuel ==
One percent of fuel requirements in Turkey are produced by biofuels, with an estimated increase of seven percent in 2023.

Biojet production is hoped to be certified in 2022. A biodiesel plant is planned. The European Union and Ministry of Industry and Technology funded the establishment of a biorefinery in Istanbul, which converts processes algae biomass into biofuel and other products.

== Bioethanol ==
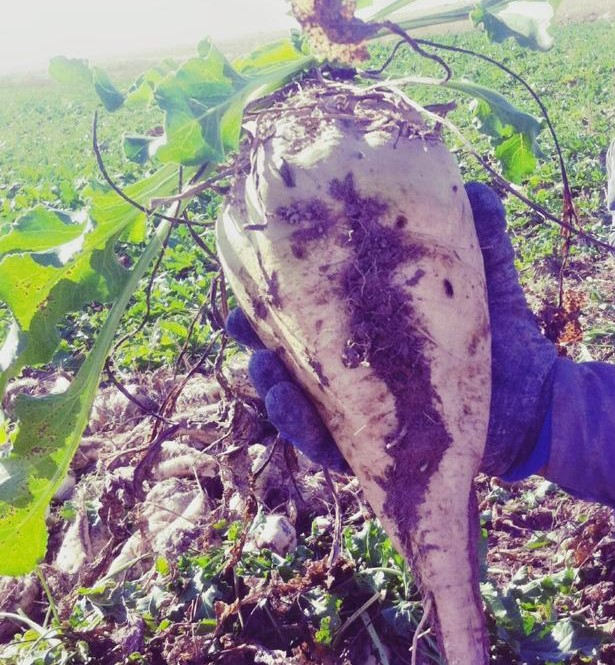
Sugar beets are the main source of bioethanol production in Turkey.

In 2011, Turkish Energy Regulatory Agency (EMRA) mandated biofuel blending for bioethanol (2%) and biodiesel (1%). Approximately 1.5 million tons of biodiesel and 3 million tons of bioethanol are produced in Turkey. Sugar beets are the main source of bioethanol production in Turkey, followed by corn and wheat, with a yearly production of 15, 4.3 and 20 tons per year, respectively.

== See also ==
- Renewable energy in Turkey
- Solar power in Turkey
- Wind power in Turkey
- Geothermal power in Turkey
- Hydroelectricity in Turkey
- Renewable energy by country
