= Greenway CSP Mersin Solar Tower =

Solar power tower

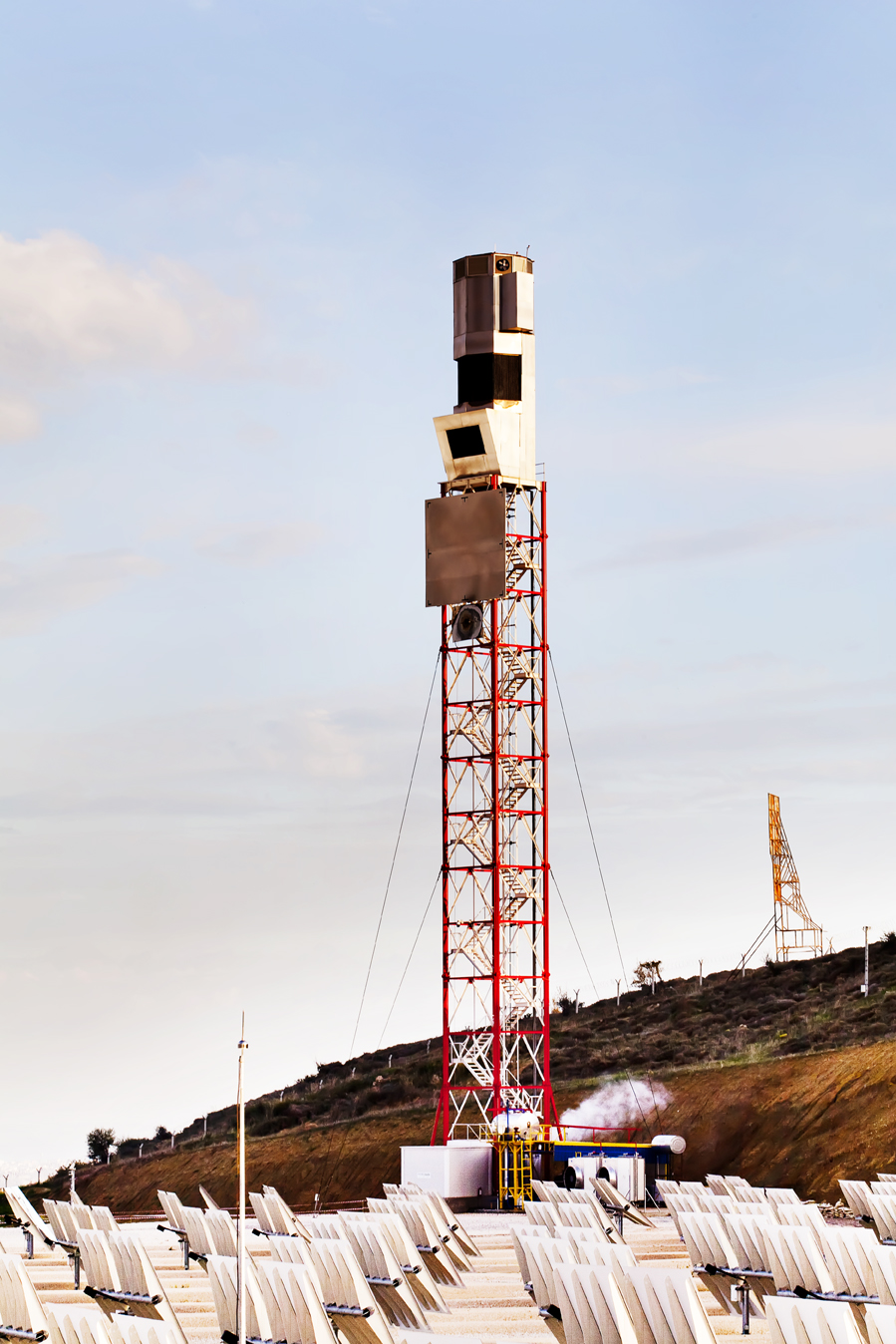
- Greenway Mersin CSP field solar tower
- Country: Turkey
- Location: Mersin
- Coordinates: 36°51′57″N 34°36′35″E
- Status: Operational
- Commission date: 2013
- Owner: Greenway CSP

Solar farm
- Type: CSP
- CSP technology: Solar power tower
- Collectors: 510
- Solar tracker: Dual-axis

Power generation
- Nameplate capacity: 5 MWth, 1 MWe

External links
- Website: www.greenwaycsp.com
- Commons: Related media on Commons

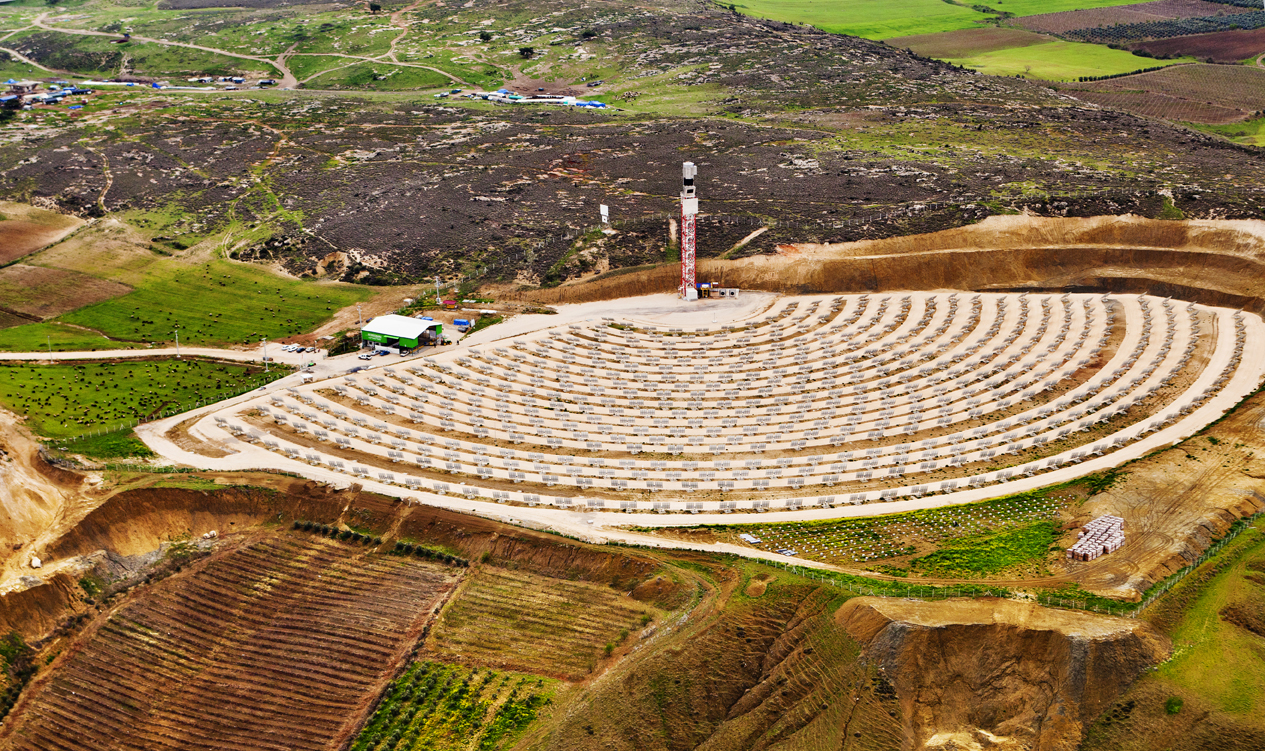
Mersin CSP field

The Greenway CSP Mersin Solar Tower is a 60-metre (200 ft) high solar power tower in Mersin Province, southern Turkey. A natural circulation direct steam generation boiler operates at 550 °C and 55 bars pressure. The receiver has four evaporators and a super-heater, and is angled at 135°.

Greenway invested 50 million dollars in the project, which was supported by the Scientific and Technological Research Council of Turkey (TÜBİTAK) and the Technology Development Foundation of Turkey (TTGV). After extensive research and development, the Greenway CSP Mersin Solar Plant began operation in March 2013. The power plant consists of 510 heliostats and has a capacity of 5 MWth. The complete heliostat field is Greenway's own proprietary design, with many innovative features like wireless heliostat field communication, precise solar position calculation, automated heliostat tracking correction, accurate reflection angle calculation, and positioning of heliostats autonomously in dual axis for optimum exposure to solar rays. In addition the Greenway heliostat design allows high reflecting efficiency and reduced manufacturing and assembly costs.

The solar tower plant is situated in the Toroslar district in the northern outskirts of Mersin city, south of the Adana-Erdemli O51 motorway, and is the first concentrated solar power tower in Turkey. Most solar power in Turkey is rooftop solar thermal collector and photovoltaic.
