= Yunus Emre power station =

Coal fired power station in Turkey

Yunus Emre Power Station
- Country: Turkey
- Coordinates: 39°59′06″N 31°38′10″E
- Status: Operational
- Commission date: 2023
- Owner: Doruk mining and electricity generating company

Thermal power station
- Primary fuel: Lignite

Power generation
- Nameplate capacity: 290 MW
- Annual net output: 0 GWh (2022); 247 GWh (2023)

Yunus Emre power station is a coal-fired power station in Turkey in Eskişehir Province. As of 2023 it is partially operational.

== Description ==
The power station was originally owned by Adularya Energy, one of the Naksan Holding companies. An environmental impact assessment was done in 2009. Adularya contracted with the builders in 2010 and construction started in 2011.

The power station was financed by the Czech Export Bank,which loaned 433 million euros interest free, with export guarantee from the Export Guarantee and Insurance Corporation. After the 2016 Turkish coup d'état attempt Naksan Holding was confiscated for allegedly helping to finance the attempt. The Savings Deposit Insurance Fund made several attempts to reprivatize the power station, and eventually sold it to Doruk (part of Yıldızlar SSS Holding).

All the lignite is mined locally then washed. The 2 units of 145 MW each are fluidized bed with electrostatic precipitators to control dust emissions. The plant was built with desulphurisation technology (Andritz dry FGD (Turbo-CDS) which was up to EU standard in 2014) but without controls on emissions of nitrogen oxides. No electricity was generated in 2019. Two million tonnes of lignite can be burned each year and net generation efficiency was estimated at 35%. The engineering, procurement, and construction contractor was Czech company Vitkovice Power Engineering. Electrical and control equipment was supplied by ABB. An ash pond was constructed. Although Turkey's net zero target is the year 2053 the power station is licensed to 2054.
