= Geothermal energy in Turkey =

Geothermal heating and electricity generation in Turkey

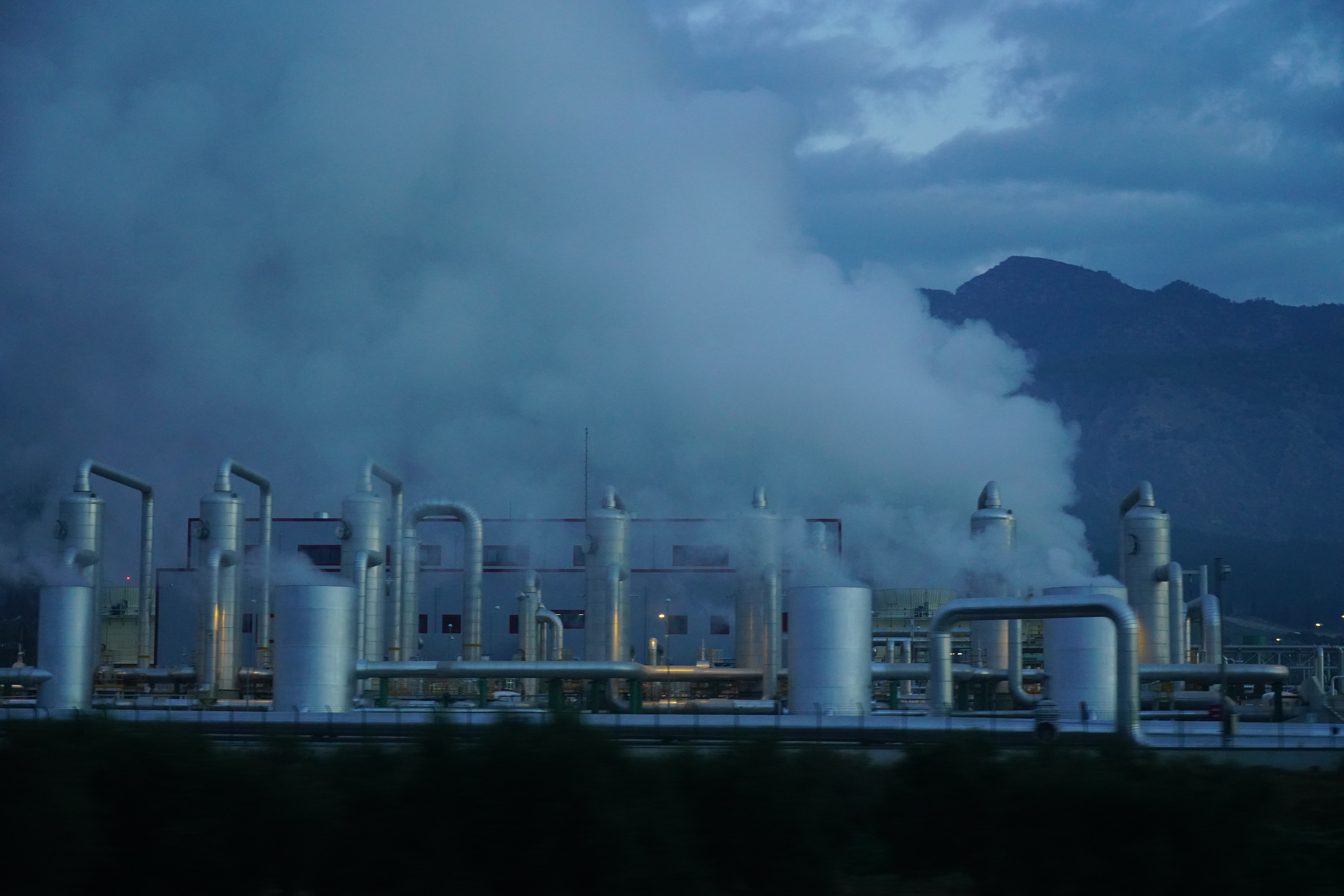
Kızıldere geothermal power plant in Denizli Province. All of Turkey's geothermal plants are in the west of the country.

Geothermal energy is a significant part of renewable energy in Turkey: it is used for geothermal heating and generates 3% of the nation's electricity. Turkey is the world's second largest user of geothermal heating, after China. Many greenhouses, spas and homes are heated by underground water; and many more buildings could be heated in this way.

People have been bathing in hot springs since antiquity. In Turkey electricity from underground steam was first generated in the late 20th century, and 63 geothermal power plants operate in Turkey as of 2022. Turkey has almost 2 GW of geothermal power installed, the fourth largest in the world. All geothermal plants are in Western Anatolia, due to its favorable geology. There is potential for 5 GW of geothermal power in total, including enhanced geothermal systems.

Carbon dioxide emissions from new geothermal power plants are high in Turkey, as the metamorphic rocks can release carbon, but the emission rate declines over a few years. Public opinion is sometimes against geothermal due to emissions of foul smelling hydrogen sulfide. To reduce the emission of both carbon dioxide and hydrogen sulfide, the fluid is sometimes completely reinjected back into the reservoir.

== History ==
Geothermal hot water has been used in spas since at least the 2nd century BC at Heiropolis, for example Roman baths. Thousands of such hot springs and hundreds of spas have been used for tourism and health (such as balneotherapy for rheumatic diseases) since ancient times, including by the Romans. In 2007 the government published a master plan for thermal tourism.

In 1965, the government's Directorate of Mineral Research and Exploration began the first geological and geophysical surveys in southwestern Turkey. The Kızıldere geothermal reservoir, on the western branch of the Büyük Menderes Graben, was found in 1968 to be suitable for electricity generation. A small 500 kW pilot power plant was built in 1974, and free electricity distributed to nearby households. The state-owned Electricity Generation Company enlarged the plant in 1984, to average around 10 MW. In 2008, the plant was privatized to Zorlu Energy with a 30 year operating lease, and they continued increasing the power, so that as of 2022 the Kızıldere Geothermal Power Plant remains Turkey's largest. In the early 21st century more power plants were built, mostly in Aydın.

In 2007, Turkey passed the Law on Geothermal Resources and Natural Mineral Waters, which accelerated geothermal exploration by making investment easier for the private sector. For example, the law reduced the number of licenses required to two.

For plants started between 2010 and 2021 the Renewable Energy Support Scheme feed-in tariff was 10.5 US cent/kWh, guaranteed for ten years. In 2021 the feed-in tariff was changed to lira and reduced.

In 2010 the installed geothermal electricity generation capacity was 100 MW while direct use installations were almost 800 MWt. By 2017 electricity generation capacity had been expanded over tenfold, to over 1 GW; and from 2009 to 2019 the number of geothermal power plants increased from 3 to 49.

== Geology ==
Down to a few kilometers under the surface (drilling has been done to almost 5 km) most rock is cooler than the boiling point of water, but there are a few high-temperature resources in the Menderes Massif, up to almost 300 °C. Due to extensional tectonism the highest temperatures are in the west. There are 16 fields hotter than 130 °C, one in the Marmara region and the rest in the Aegean Region. The high geothermal potential is due to the geology of Turkey, such as the radiogenic granites of western Anatolia and the Western Anatolian Graben systems (Büyük Menderes and Gediz Grabens). The heat generated by the radioactivity of these granites, which cover over 4000 sq. km, ranges from around 5 to 16 μW/m^{3}.

However the carbon content of non-condensable gases in the geothermal fluids are high at many plants, therefore care must be taken to avoid excessive carbon emissions.

=== Carbon-dioxide emissions ===
The geology of the metamorphic rocks of the Buyuk Menderes and Gediz grabens is unusual: especially in acid conditions the calcite in the rocks can release a lot of CO_{2} into the surrounding very hot water. The CO_{2} emissions from new geothermal plants in Turkey are some of the highest in the world, ranging from 900 to 1300 g/kWh (similar to coal power) but gradually decline. According to a 2020 report, these short-term high CO_{2} emissions can be dealt with. (Note: A European study showing no net increase in CO_{2} did not include Turkey.) Measures might include reinjection into the reservoir, or removal methods such as CarbFix. Because emissions decline over time the World Bank has estimated that lifetime emissions will be similar to the world geothermal average. The problem is not expected outside these two grabens.

== Direct use of heat ==
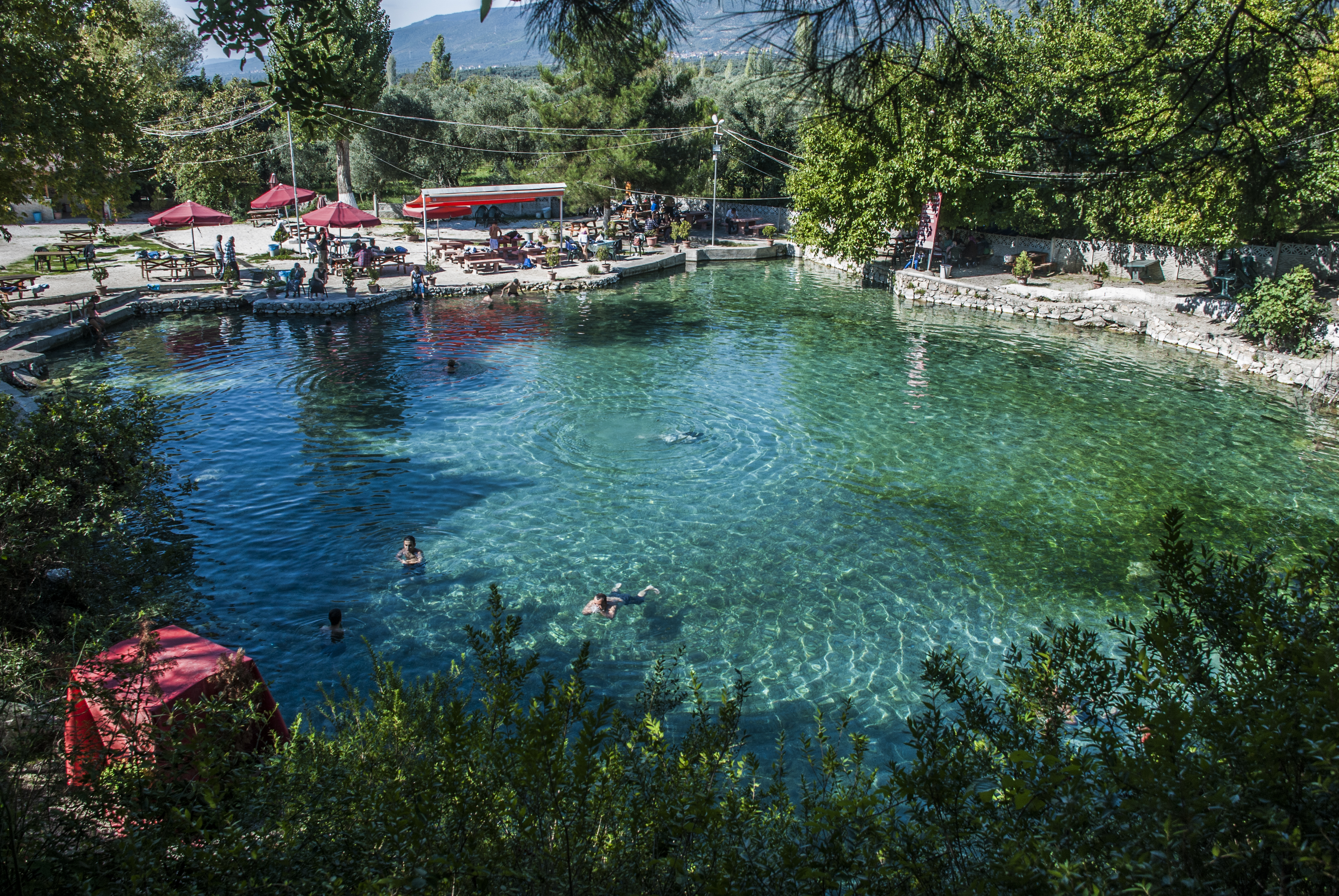
Geothermally heated spa in Keramet, Orhangazi

Although in most places the rocks are not hot enough to make steam to generate electricity, almost every region has heating possibilities, with theoretical total potential of 60 gigawatt thermal (GWth – meaning gigawatts of thermal power which means how fast heat is produced). As low as 40 to 45 °C is used. Turkey is second only to China in direct use, with almost 4 GWth, including 1120 MWt district heating, 855 MWt greenhouse heating and many spas and hotels. It is hoped that spas will extend the season for tourism in Turkey.

Direct-use heating is mostly district heating serving over 125,000 households. There is also 4.5 million m2 of heated greenhouses; and 520 spas, bathing and swimming pools (1400 MWth). Further heat is sometimes pumped out of the waste water, for example to heat houses. With these heated greenhouses crops can be grown even in the coldest areas; tomatoes are exported and fruit dried.

Nevertheless in 2021 the International Energy Agency said that there was still untapped potential to heat buildings, and in 2022 Ufuk Senturk, president of the Geothermal Power Plant Investors Association, said that the number of homes heated could be increased from 160 thousand to a million. According to the Greenhouse Investors and Manufacturers Association there are 5,400 decares of geothermally heated greenhouses (first in the world) as of 2022 with payback in 4 to 7 years, but this could be increased to 30 thousand decares. District heating is sometimes combined with electricity generation, and can save money compared to gas heating.

== Power plants in operation ==
Geothermal power plants in Turkey (commons:Data:PowerPlant/Turkey/geothermal-operational.map)

Geothermal electricity generation (red), shown as part of total electricity generation in Turkey (2015–2021), has increased slowly.

As of 2022 there were 63 plants on 27 geothermal fields. Turkey is fourth in the world for geothermal power; with about half that of the United States, and slightly less than Indonesia and the Philippines. The regulator is the Energy Market Regulatory Authority.

Almost all geothermal power plants are south or east of Izmir, Turkey's third largest city. Kızıldere is the most powerful, followed by Efeler. Electricity generation potential from hydrothermal (conventional geothermal rather than enhanced) was estimated at 4 GW in 2020, over double the actual capacity.

Two-thirds of the installed capacity uses binary technology (hot water from the ground evaporates a fluid with a lower boiling point which drives the turbines) while the rest use the flash cycle (some of the high pressure and very hot water from the ground "flashes" to steam which drives the turbines directly). Suppliers of binary-cycle technology; such as Atlas Copco, Exergy and Ormat; are prominent in the market. At high enthalpy and high temperature combined flash-binary plants are more efficient. Sometimes wells owned by competing companies interfere with each other.

== Environmental impact and public opinion ==
There are both existing and planned plants in areas with vulnerabilities, such as the valuable soils in Buharkent.

In 2019 Enel sponsored the 88KEYS Institute to conduct a public opinion survey in Aydın, the province with the most geothermal potential. At that time, over a fifth of people over 45 believed geothermal power was damaging to health. About half of that age group also believed that it is not harmful if properly managed, as did about two-thirds of younger people. In the 2010s there were concerns about the possibility of heavy metals being released to water or soil, but as of 2022 no heavy metal pollution from power plants has been found, although boron was found in irrigation water in 2017 which may damage crops. However arsenic has been found in greywater from direct heating and it has been suggested such water could be filtered by biochar.

In 2020 the Ministry of Environment and the European Bank for Reconstruction and Development published a guide which recommended various social, environmental and technical best practices, including that the World Health Organization (WHO) recommends that the concentration of foul smelling H_{2}S gas in the air should not exceed 7 μg/m3 in an average of 30 minutes. The WHO says that due to the strong public reaction against odor from geothermal power plants and the resulting social perceptions, the odor problem needs to be taken very seriously and solutions need to be implemented. WHO recommended technologies that guarantee the re-injection of the entire source (liquid + non-condensable gases) during operation as the most effective method to prevent gases from being released into the atmosphere. WHO further advised that H_{2}S could be reinjected together with CO_{2}, as is sometimes done in Iceland. However the carbon price in Iceland is the same as the EU Allowance (around 80 euros a tonne in mid-2022), whereas in Turkey there is no immediate financial penalty for releasing it because the Turkish Emissions Trading System is not yet charging.

== Financing ==
Geothermal has high upfront costs and is financially risky, but if public money is invested at an early stage of a project that gives private investors confidence to complete the financing. In 2022 the World Bank loaned $300 million for geothermal energy, some to private companies via the state industrial development bank Türkiye Sınai Kalkınma Bankası. According to the Geothermal Power Plant Investors Association the cost of a kilometre deep well is about 1 million USD. However it may be possible to use existing oil exploration boreholes in Southeast Anatolia. The feed-in-tariff is in lira and adjusted quarterly, but capped at 8.6 US cents/kWh. In 2021, the Geothermal Energy Association said that development costs (measured in lira) were increasing 70% annually (official inflation of the economy of Turkey was also about 70% in mid-2022), but that the feed in tariff quarterly increases were not keeping pace; so they called for monthly increases. After YEKDEM was changed to lira in 2021 investment decreased.

== Research and development ==
International conferences on geothermal energy are held most years in Turkey, such as the Women in Geothermal conference in Istanbul and the International Geothermal Energy Congress & Exhibition in Izmir. Dry hot rock geothermal fields in eastern Turkey have not been fully explored and such enhanced geothermal has expensive engineering challenges. It has also been estimated that 30% of Turkish residences could be heated through geothermal energy. Studies show that geothermal energy could also be used for desalination or to produce hydrogen by electrolysis; but as of 2022 this has not been applied practically. As Turkey is prone to earthquakes, research on induced seismic risk is also a significant topic, and the increased number of geothermal plants may have caused the increased surface cracks observed in the area. Construction is an important part of the Turkish economy, and it has been suggested that the technology used to produce dry ice (solid carbon dioxide) at Kızıldere and Tuzla geothermal power plants could be adapted to capture CO_{2} emissions from cement production. Produced dry ice can also be used to fight wildfires in Turkey. Extracting lithium from geothermal water is being researched, to meet some of the demand from increasing battery production.

Development is supported by the World Bank and the European Bank for Reconstruction and Development via the Green Economy Financing Facility. As of 2021 further research is needed on CO_{2} emissions, but projects with estimated average annual lifetime emissions above 540 gCO_{2}/kWh (this is roughly similar to a gas-fired power plant) will not be financed.
