= Circulating water plant =

Industrial equipment

A circulating water plant or circulating water system is an arrangement of flow of water in fossil-fuel power stations, chemical plants, and oil refineries. Such a system is required because various industrial process plants uses heat exchangers, and also for active fire protection measures. In chemical plants, for example in caustic soda production, water is needed in bulk for the preparation of brine. The circulating water system in any plant consists of a circulator pump, which develops an appropriate hydraulic head, and pipelines to circulate the water in the entire plant.

== System description ==
=== Circulating water pumps ===
Circulating water systems are normally of the wet-pit type, but for sea-water circulation, both the wet-pit type and the concrete-volute type are employed. In some industries, one or two standby pumps are also connected parallel to CW pumps. It is recommended that these pumps must be constantly driven by constant-speed squirrel-cage induction motors. CW pumps are designed as per IS:9137, standards of the Hydraulic Institute, USA, or equivalent.

=== Cooling tower ===
In the present era, mechanical induced draft–type cooling towers are employed in cooling of water. Performance testing of cooling towers (both IDCT and NDCT) shall be carried out as per ATC-105 at a time when the atmospheric conditions are within the permissible limits of deviation from the design conditions. As guidelines of Central Electricity Authority, two mechanical-draft cooling towers or one natural-draft cooling tower must be established for each 500 MW unit in power plants. The cooling towers are designed as per Cooling Tower Institute codes.

=== CW treatment system ===
Some coastal power stations or chemical plants intake water from sea for condenser cooling. They use either closed-cycle cooling by using cooling towers or once-through cooling. The selection of the type of system is based on the thermal pollution effect on seawater and techno-economics based on the distance of the power station from the coast and the cost of pumping seawater.

== Mechanical description of CW plants ==
- Five (4 working + 1 standby) circulating water pumps of vertical wet-pit type, mixed-flow design and self-water-lubricated, along with motors and associated accessories.
- Electro-hydraulically operated butterfly valve (with actuators), isolating butterfly valve, and rubber expansion joints at the discharge of each pump. Electrically operated butterfly valves for interconnection of standby pumps to operate as common standby for both units.
- One CW recirculation line for each unit, suitable for handling a flow of 50% of one CW pump flow with electrically operated butterfly valve (with actuators).
- Complete piping, including discharge piping/header of CW pumps, a CW duct from the CW pumphouse to the condensers, and from the condensers to the cooling towers, blowdown piping (up to an ash-handling plant and central monitoring basin of ETP), fittings & valves and other accessories as required.
- EOT crane for handling & maintenance of CW pumps and monorail and electrically operated pendant control hoist arrangement for maintenance of stoplog gates and trash racks.
- One trash rack for the CW pumphouse bay and two stop logs for the CW pumphouse.
- Air release valves, with isolation valves, in CW piping as per the system requirement.
- Hydraulic transient analysis of the CW system.
- CW pump model study and CW pumphouse/sump model studies as required.

== Codes and standards ==
Sr No.	IS CODE	Specification
1	IS: 804	Rectangular pressed steel tanks
2	IS: 1239	Mild steel tubes, tubular, & other wrought steel fittings
3	IS: 1520	Horizontal, centrifugal pumps for clear, cold fresh water
4	IS: 1536	Centrifugally cast (spun) iron pressure pipes for water, gas, and sewage
5	IS: 1537	Vertically cast iron pressure pipes for water, gas, and sewage
6	IS: 1710	Vertical turbine pumps for clear, cold fresh water
7	IS: 2002	Steel plates for boilers
8	IS: 2062	Structural steel (Fusion welding quality)
9	IS: 2594	Horizontal mild-steel welded storage tanks
10	IS: 2825	Code for unfired pressure vessels
11	IS: 3589	Electrical welded pipes for water, gas, & sewage (200 to 2000mm)
12	IS: 3832	Hand-operated chain pulley block
13	IS: 4682	Code of practice for lining of vessels and equipment for chemical processes-rubber lining
14	IS: 5120	Technical requirements for rotodynamic special-purpose pumps
15	IS: 5639	Pumps handling chemicals and corrosive liquids
16	IS: 5659	Pumps for process water
17	IS: 6393	Steel pipe flanges
18	IS: 6547	Electric chain hoist
19	BS: 5155	Cast-iron & carbon-steel butterfly valves for general purpose
20	AWWA-C-504	Rubber seated butterfly valves
