= Aydem Holding =

Turkish holding company

- Headquarters: Turkey
- Subsidiaries: Aydem Energy

Aydem Holding is a conglomerate headquartered in Turkey with companies in energy such as Aydem Energy (formerly called Bereket Energy). Aydem Energy owns Çatalağzı power station and Yatağan power station. Due to these coal-fired power stations in Turkey it is on the Urgewald Global Coal Exit List. In July 2025 the government legislated that mining companies will not have to wait for EIA approval from the ministry before extending their mine.
