= Ember (non-profit organisation) =

Global energy think tank

Coordinates: 51°31′14.6″N 0°5′55″W

- Formation: 2008; 18 years ago
- Type: Non-profit
- Region served: Global
- Website: ember-energy.org
- Formerly called: Sandbag

Ember, formerly Sandbag, is an independent global energy think tank that uses data and policy to accelerate the clean energy transition. Headquartered in the UK, the organisation was launched in 2008 by Bryony Worthington.

== History ==
Ember was originally founded in 2008 as Sandbag, focussing on the European Union's Emission Trading Scheme, allowing its members to campaign to reduce the number of permits in circulation and to purchase permits and cancel them.

Sandbag was re-branded as Ember in 2020 with a focus on the global power sector, while a separate Brussels-based organisation was established to continue work on the ETS.

== Research ==
Ember currently produces research on global electricity trends and coal mine methane emissions, including research on the EU, India, Indonesia, Australia and Türkiye.

== Data ==
Ember’s open data covers annual electricity generation data for over 200 countries and regions, and monthly electricity generation data for 85 countries and regions. It also provides 16 open data tools which track regional and global electricity transitions and coal mine methane emissions standards.

- Electricity Data Explorer
- India electricity data explorer
- 2030 Global Renewable Target Tracker
- US electricity data explorer
- European power price tracker
- Live EU NECP Tracker
- Data tacker: coal mine methane emissions
- China's Solar PV exports
- Türkiye electricity data tools
- Electricity Interconnection in Europe
- Europe's Clean Power Pathways Explorer
- EU power plant emissions
- Asia Data finder
- Carbon Price Tracker
- Indian State RES target and progress tracker (2022)
- Coal mine-to-plant explorer

== Key publications ==
- Global Electricity Review
- European Electricity Review
- India’s State Electricity Transition
- Türkiye Electricity Review
- In The Dark: underreporting of coal mine methane is a major climate risk
