= Social Insurance Institution =

Social Insurance Institution may refer to:

- Social Insurance Institution (Poland)
- Social Insurance Institution (Turkey)
