= Health in Turkey =

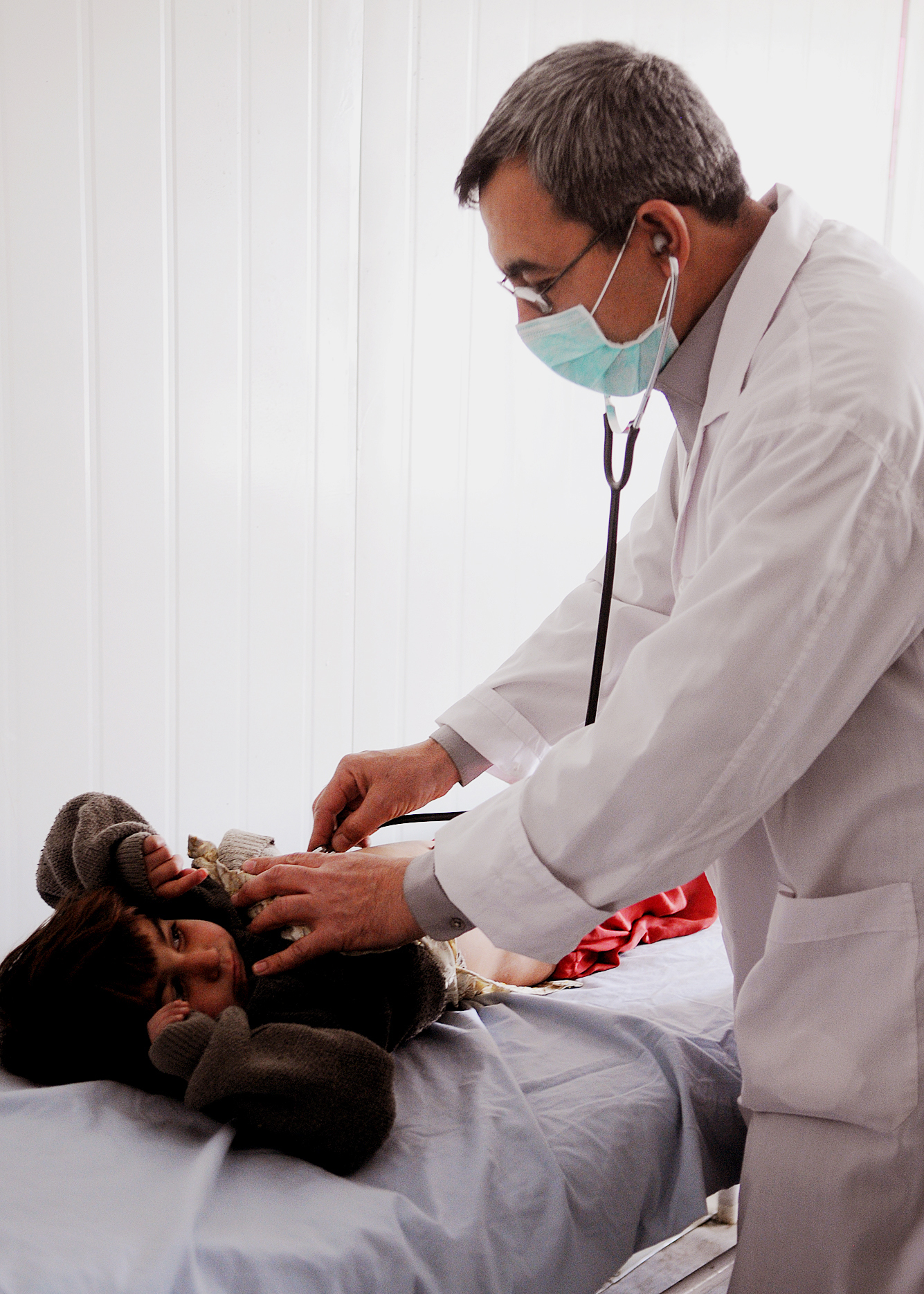
Turkish pediatrician listens to a child's heartbeat.

The healthcare system in Turkey has seen substantial improvements since the implementation of the Health Transformation Program (HTP) in 2003, which sought to expand access to healthcare services and increase efficiency and equity in service delivery under the motto "Health for All." The program established the General Health Insurance Scheme, primarily financed through contributions from employers, employees, and the government via the Social Security Institution, resulting in near-universal health coverage. While overall health indicators such as life expectancy and child mortality have improved, regional disparities and challenges in reproductive health persist. As of 2023, Turkey does not conduct systematic health impact assessments, and its performance in fulfilling the right to health—particularly reproductive health—lags behind international expectations relative to its income level.

== Background ==
Prior to the Health Transformation Program, Turkey’s healthcare system faced limitations in accessibility, efficiency, and equity. The introduction of the HTP in 2003 marked a comprehensive reform aimed at overhauling the structure and financing of health services. By extending health insurance coverage and integrating service delivery, the program significantly improved population health outcomes. However, inequalities remain: for instance, the under-5 mortality rate in 2021 was 7.9 in Western Marmara, compared to 16.3 in Southeastern Anatolia, reflecting persistent regional imbalances. Demographically, Turkey is experiencing a shift marked by population aging and declining fertility; between 2007 and 2022, fertility rates dropped from 2.16 to 1.62, while life expectancy rose to 78.3 years (2018–2020). According to the Human Rights Measurement Initiative, Turkey fulfills 81.6% of its right-to-health obligations based on its income' performing well in child and adult health but poorly in reproductive health, meeting just 57.3% of expectations in that area.

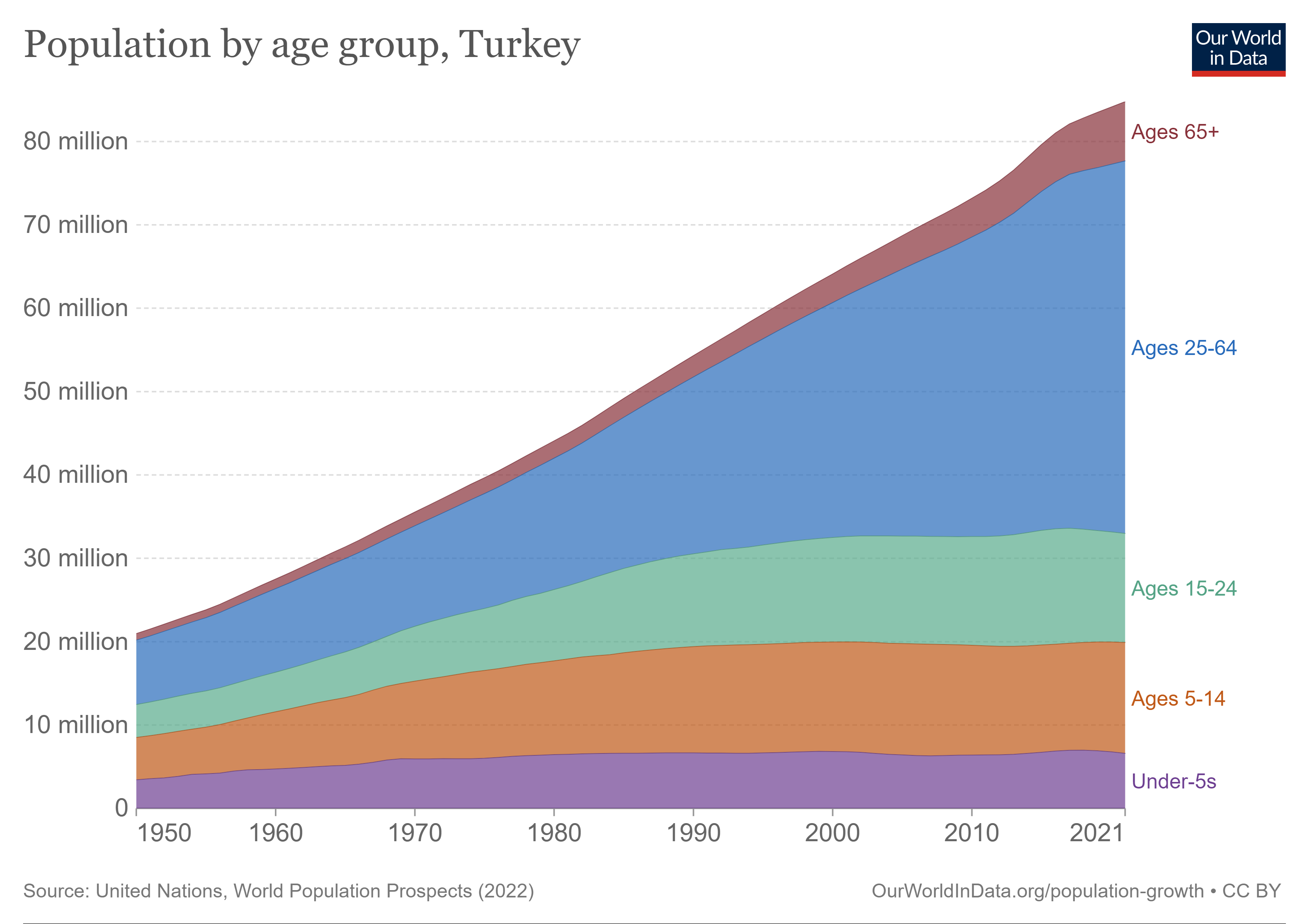
Population by age group in Turkey between 1950 and 2021

== Turkish health system ==
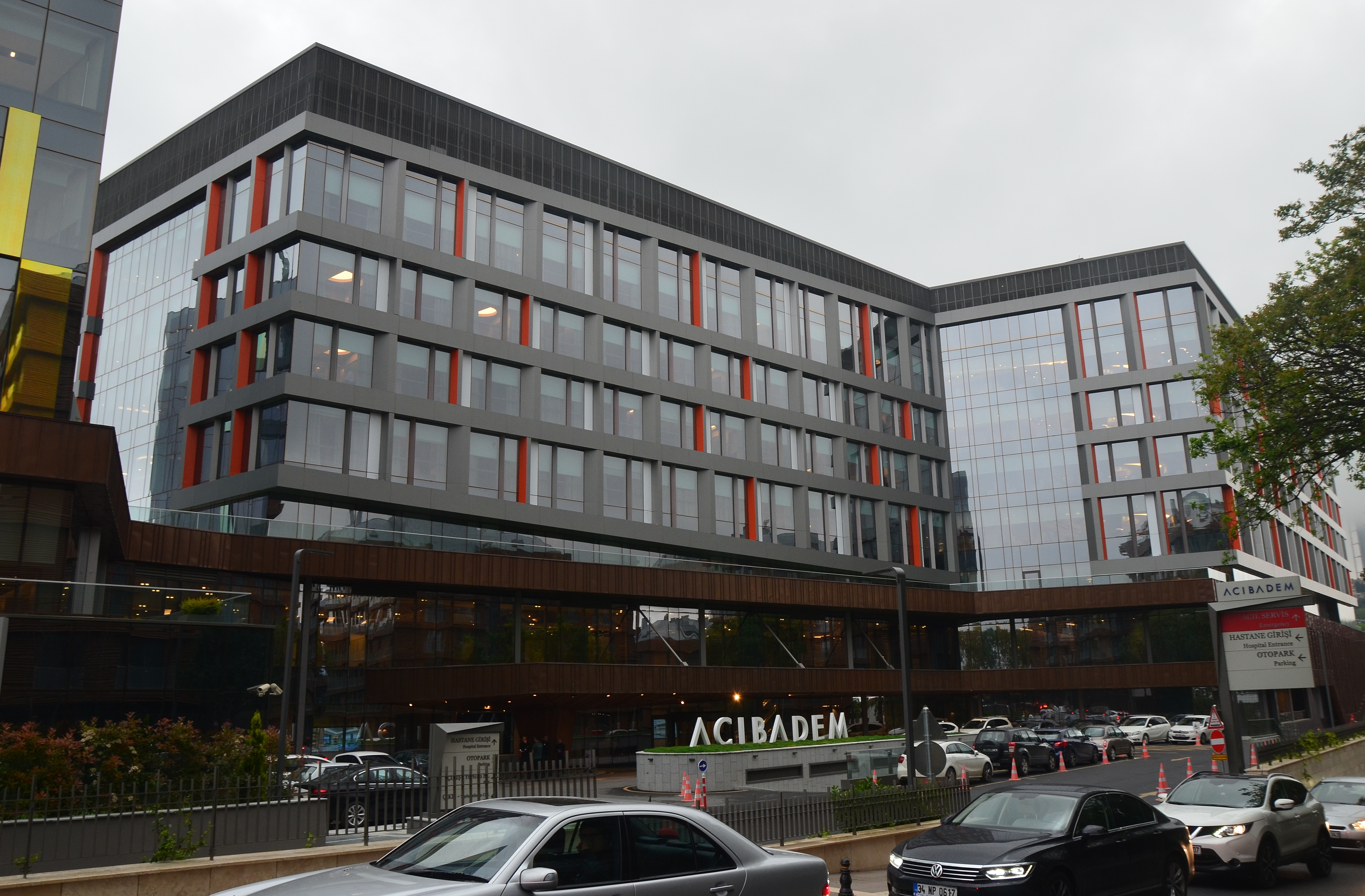
Acıbadem Hospital in Altunizade neighborhood of Üsküdar, Istanbul

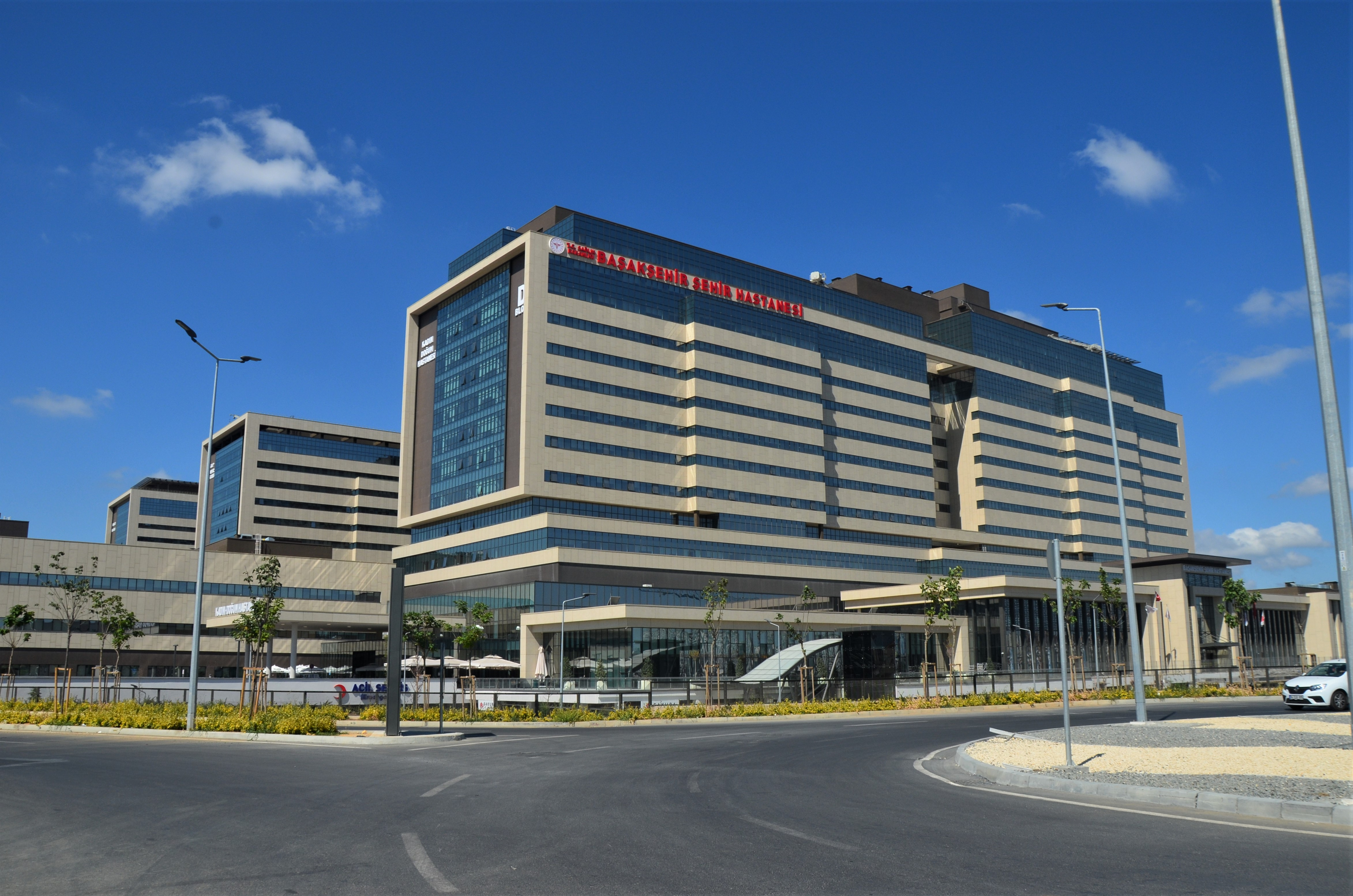
Modern Başakşehir Çam and Sakura City Hospital in Istanbul

Health services in Turkey are controlled by the Ministry of Health through a centralized state system. In 2003, the government introduced a comprehensive health reform program aimed at increasing the budget rate allocated to healthcare services and ensuring that a large part of the population is healthy. The Turkish Statistical Institute announced that it had spent 76.3 billion TL in health services in 2012; the Social Security Institution covered 79.6% of the service fees while the remaining 15.4% were paid directly by the patients." According to 2013 figures, there are 30,116 health institutions in Turkey and per one doctor there are an average of 573 patients. In addition, the number of beds per 1000 people is 2.64. Life expectancy in Turkey is 75.6 years for males and 81.3 years for females, and the life expectancy of the total population is 78.3 years. The three most common causes of mortality in the country are cardiovascular diseases (35.4%), cancer (15.2%), respiratory diseases (13.5%).

Healthcare in Turkey is majorly provided by Ministry of Health and some private health institutions.

=== Primary healthcare system ===
The Turkish Public Health Association is accountable for the primary healthcare delivery in Turkey.

Services that are managed, developed and supervised by the Public Health Association are (health related units):

==== Primary Health Care Services ====
- Supervising the Family Medicine Unit (which consists of a Family Physician and a health personnel) and General Practitioners
- Immigration Healthcare Services

==== Communicable Diseases Control Programmes ====
- Early warning-response field epidemiology unit
- Communicable Diseases Unit
- Preventable diseases -Vaccination Unit
- Vector-borne and Zoonotic Diseases Unit
- Tuberculosis Unit
- Microbiology Laboratories Unit

==== Non-communicable Diseases Programmes and Cancer ====
- Tobacco and other addictive substances campaign Unit
- Cancer Unit
- Mental Health Programmes Unit
- Obesity, Diabetes, Other Metabolic Diseases Unit
- Chronic Diseases, Elderly and Disabled Unit
- Women and Reproductive Health unit
- Child and Adolescent Health Unit

== Maternal mortality ratio ==
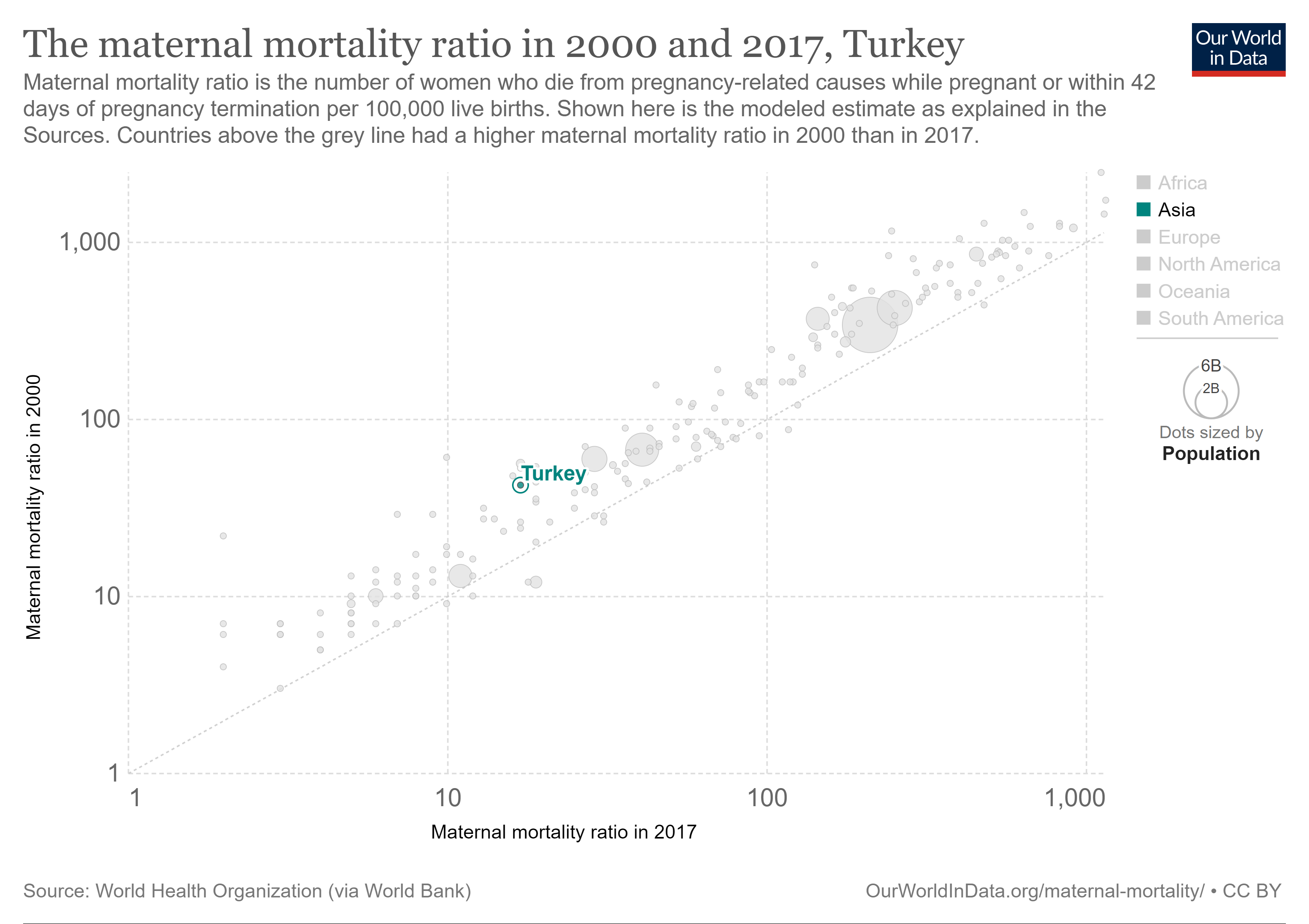
The maternal mortality ratio in 2000 and 2017, Turkey and other countries behind

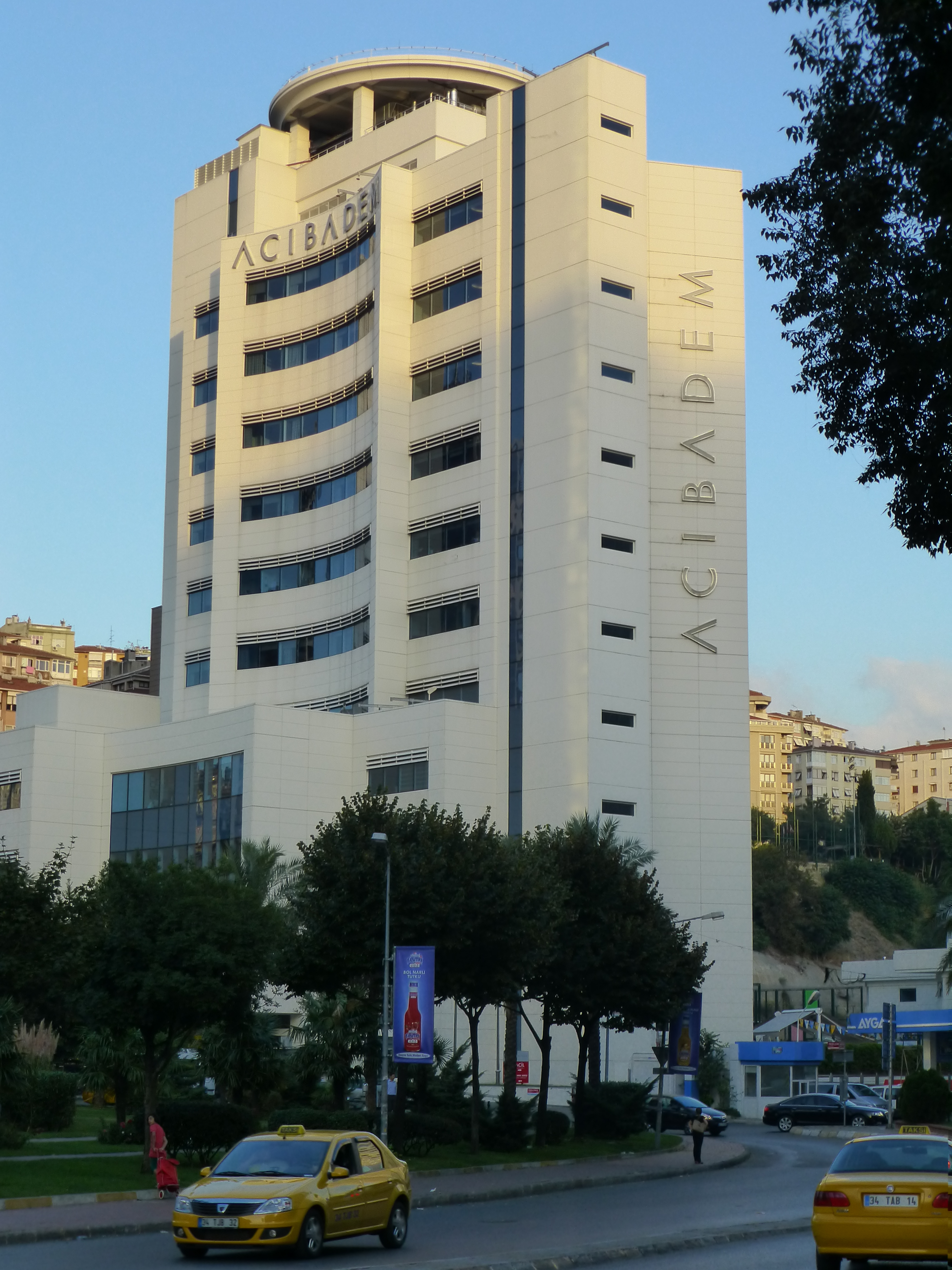
Acibadem Hospital in Istanbul

According to the WHO data between the years 2000 to 2017, Maternal mortality ratio (MMR) in Turkey has decreased from 42 to 17 in 17 years. In 2010, Turkey was nearly on par with some of the other OECD countries such as South Korea and Hungary and had a lower maternal mortality ratio than the United States.

	2000	2005	2010	2015	2017
MMR(Per 100,000 live births)	42	33	24	19	17

== Under-five Mortality Rate (U5MR) ==
Turkey's U5MR in 2021 was reduced by 88% over 1990 levels, while in the rest of the world the total reduction was %59 between 1990 and 2021. Even though Turkey has accomplished to reduce U5MR, it has always been higher than the Europe and Central Asia averages between 1990 and 2021.

	1990	1995	2000	2005	2010	2015	2021
U5MR (per 1000 live births)	74	54	38	26	18	13	9

== Causes of death ==
The top 5 causes of death are cardiovascular diseases (35.4%), cancer (15.2%), respiratory diseases (13.5%), endocrine and nutritional diseases (4.5%), and others (13%). When the diseases causing death are examined on a gender basis; deaths from circulatory and endocrine diseases were found mostly in women and deaths from cancers and external causes were seen in men.

YEARS (%)	cardiovascular system diseases	benign and malignant tumors	respiratory system diseases	endocrine, nutrition and metabolism related diseases	COVID-19	nervous system and sensory organs diseases
2021	33.5	14.0	13.4	4.2	11.5	3.3
2022	35.4	15.2	14.4	4.5	4.4	3.6

NCDs already account for over 89 percent of all mortality in Turkey.

Top ten causes of deaths in 2019 from the most causes to the least are:

- Ischemic heart disease
- Stroke
- Lung cancer
- COPD
- Alzheimer's disease
- Diabetes
- Chronic kidney disease
- Hypertensive heart disease
- Lower respiratory infections
- Colorectal cancer

However, combining death causes with disability causes is changing the top ten list and, it includes low back pain, neonatal disorders, depressive disorders, headache disorders, and gynecological diseases.

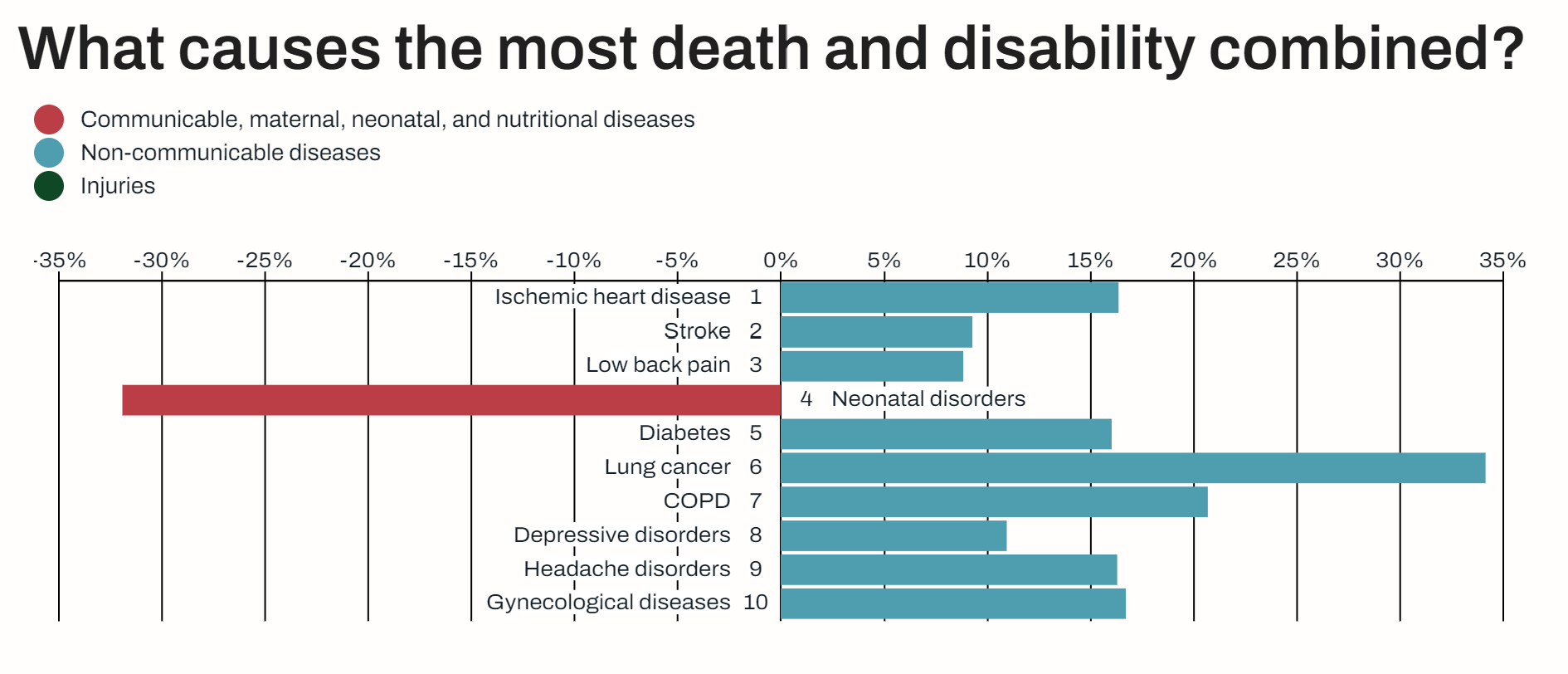
Top 10 causes of death and disability (DALYs) in 2019 and percent change 2009–2019, all ages combined

The risk factors the drive most death and disability in Turkey are tobacco use, high body-mass index and high blood pressure. WHO estimates that 42% of men are tobacco smokers.

"Multisectoral action plan of Turkey for non-communicable diseases 2017–2025" has been established by the Turkish Ministry of Health in order to halt and manage the NCDs in Turkey. The action plan is coordinated with the Sustainable Development Goals.

== Obesity and Dietary Behaviors ==
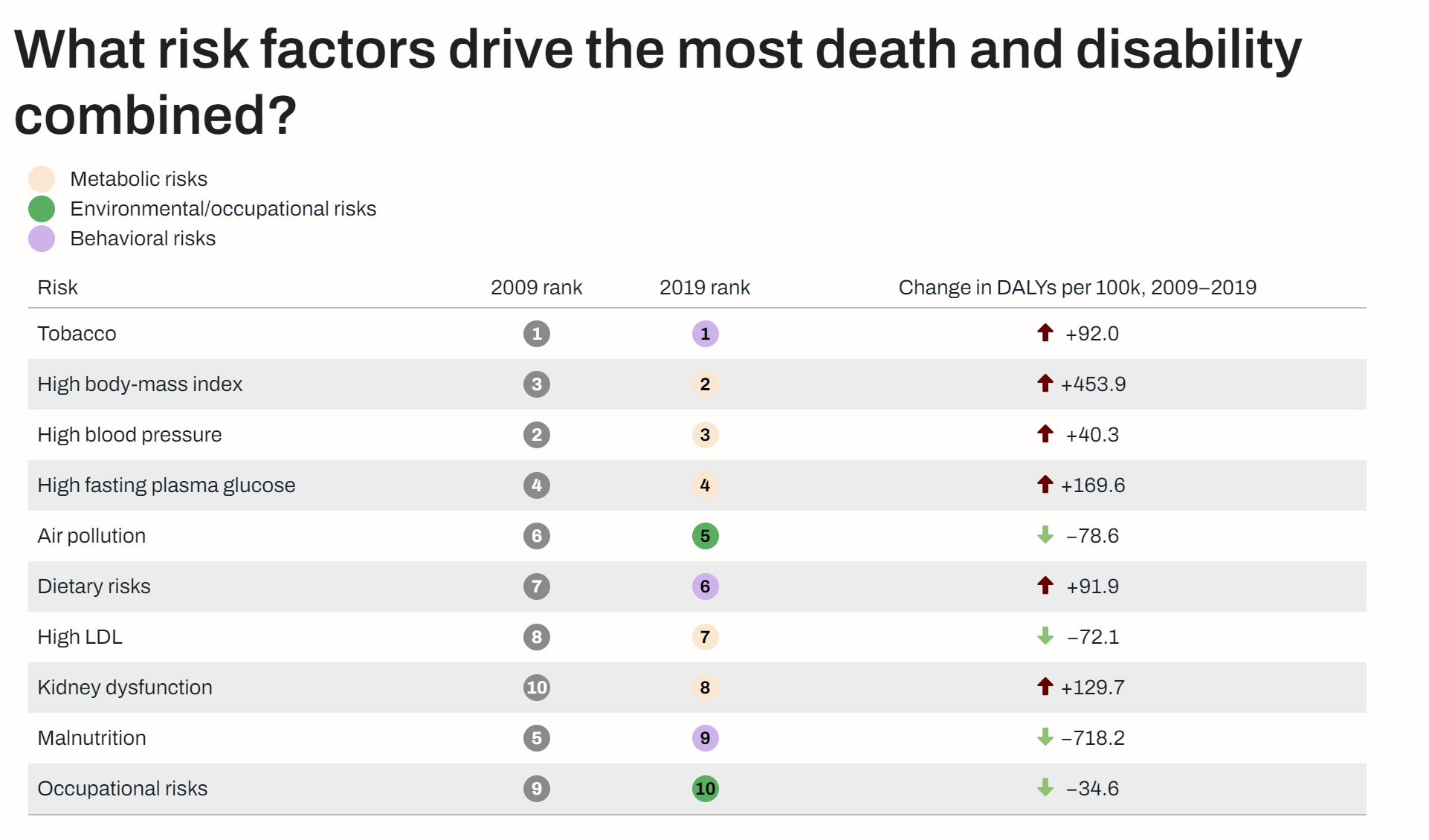

One of the risk factors that causes death and disability is a high body-mass index, which increased the DALYs (per 100.000) +453.9 between 2009 and 2019 in Turkey. The other risk factors that are on the top ten list, many of them related to eating behaviors. Turkey has the highest rate of obesity in the WHO European Region; according to the European Obesity Report 2022 by WHO, more than 65% of adults are overweight or obese in Turkey. Further, obesity in females (39.1%) is higher than in males (24.6%).

The increased prevalence of obesity in Turkey is attributed to the changes in dietary behaviors. Turkish people eat fewer grains, bread, vegetables, and fruits than before. This causes an increase in fat intake and energy percentage from fats and a decrease in vitamin C intake. Although the energy and macronutrient intakes are within the recommended ranges (carbonhydrates: 50%, protein: 15%, and fat: 35%), it is seen that the diet of Turkish people has shifted to a Western-type diet in terms of micronutrients and food groups.

Additionally, one of the determinants of obesity is urbanization in Turkey due to sedentary lifestyle in the cities, availability of public transportation, working more at office jobs, and changes in social and economic structure. Migrating to big cities is popular and causes high unemployment rates, which might also cause less physical activity. The other social determinants of obesity are being married and having a lower educational level in Turkey. A lack of knowledge about health and the health consequences contribute to the high percentage of excessive weight.

Obesity and being overweight is higher among women for several reasons. A majority of women do not have jobs outside of the home and lead more sedentary lifestyles as a result. Housework is often the only source of physical activity for women, as there is no prior tradition of women participating in sports.

"Turkey Health Nutrition and Active Life Program (2014–2017)" is implemented by the Ministry of Health in Turkey in order to prevent obesity and reduce obesity-related diseases (cardiovascular diseases, diabetes, some types of cancer, hypertension, and musculoskeletal diseases) by encouraging people to have adequate and balanced nutrition and regular physical activity habits. In 2019, the Ministry of Health in Turkey extended the program and introduced the "Adult and Childhood Obesity Prevention and Physical Activity Action Plan (2019-2023). One of the actions in the program addresses the decreased purchasing power problem in Turkey by minimizing inflation on healthy products such as fish, milk, fruit, and vegetables and taking actions to increase purchasing power.

In 2022 half of children ate fruit every day, and a third ate vegetables every day. Placing fruit and vegetables outside shops attracts customers. In 2022 a lawsuit was started claiming that the ban on vegan cheese was unconstitutional. Sugar beet is subsidized. Although a healthy amount of sugar is less than 50g a day for an adult the sugar production quota for market year 26/27 was 3 million tonnes, thus for the population of under 90 million about twice as much sugar is produced than is healthy. On average Turks consume 35 kilograms a year, mostly as confectionery.

== Diabetes ==
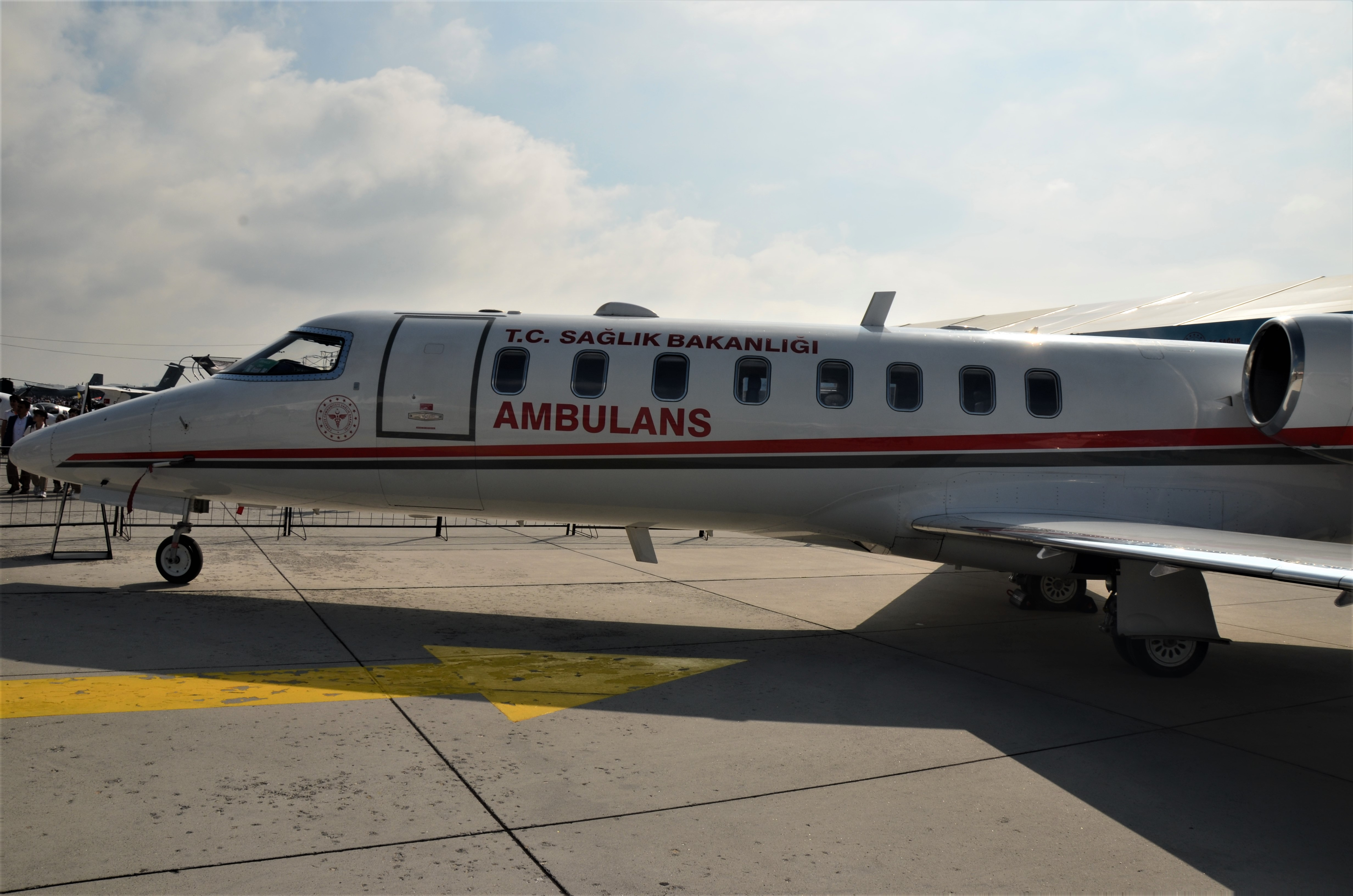
Learjet 45 air ambulance of the Ministry of Health

Diabetes causes 2% of total deaths in all ages in Turkey. Furthermore many more Turks die from Diabetic Kidney disease, a complication of Diabetes and non-diabetic High blood sugar, and some say that the consequences of Diabetes could cause up to 20% of all deaths in Turkey.

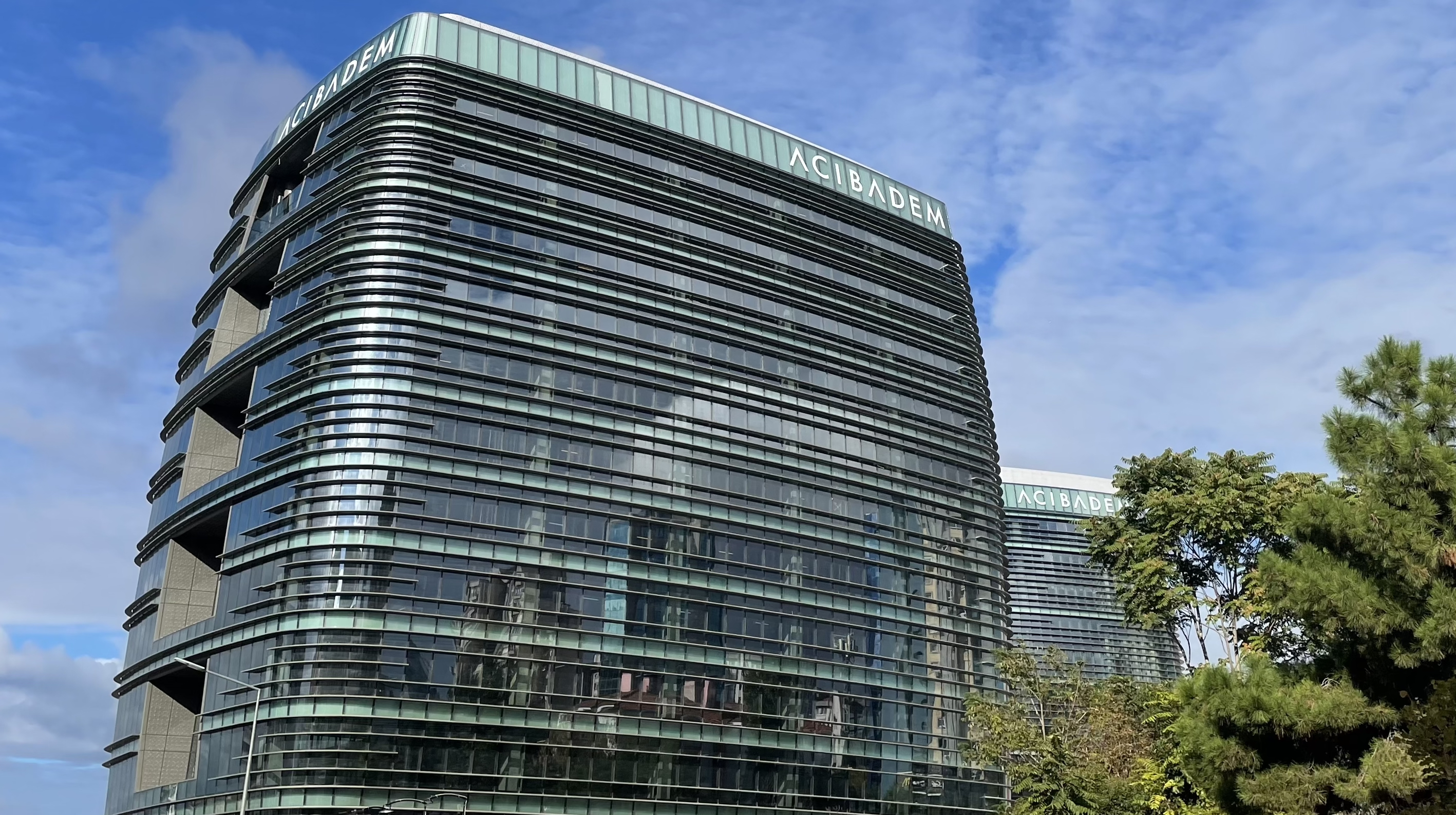
Acıbadem Headquarters and Hospital in Istanbul

In 2016 it was estimated that 13.2% of the population had diabetes and there is an increasing trend in the prevalence of diabetes. The main cause of this could be the fact that over Nearly 2 in 3 Turks are overweight and that 1 in 3 are obese.

Diabetes has been described as "one of the top priorities" for the Turkish government. An operational action plan for diabetes, overweight and obesity exists as a national response to the diabetes.

== Air pollution and climate change ==
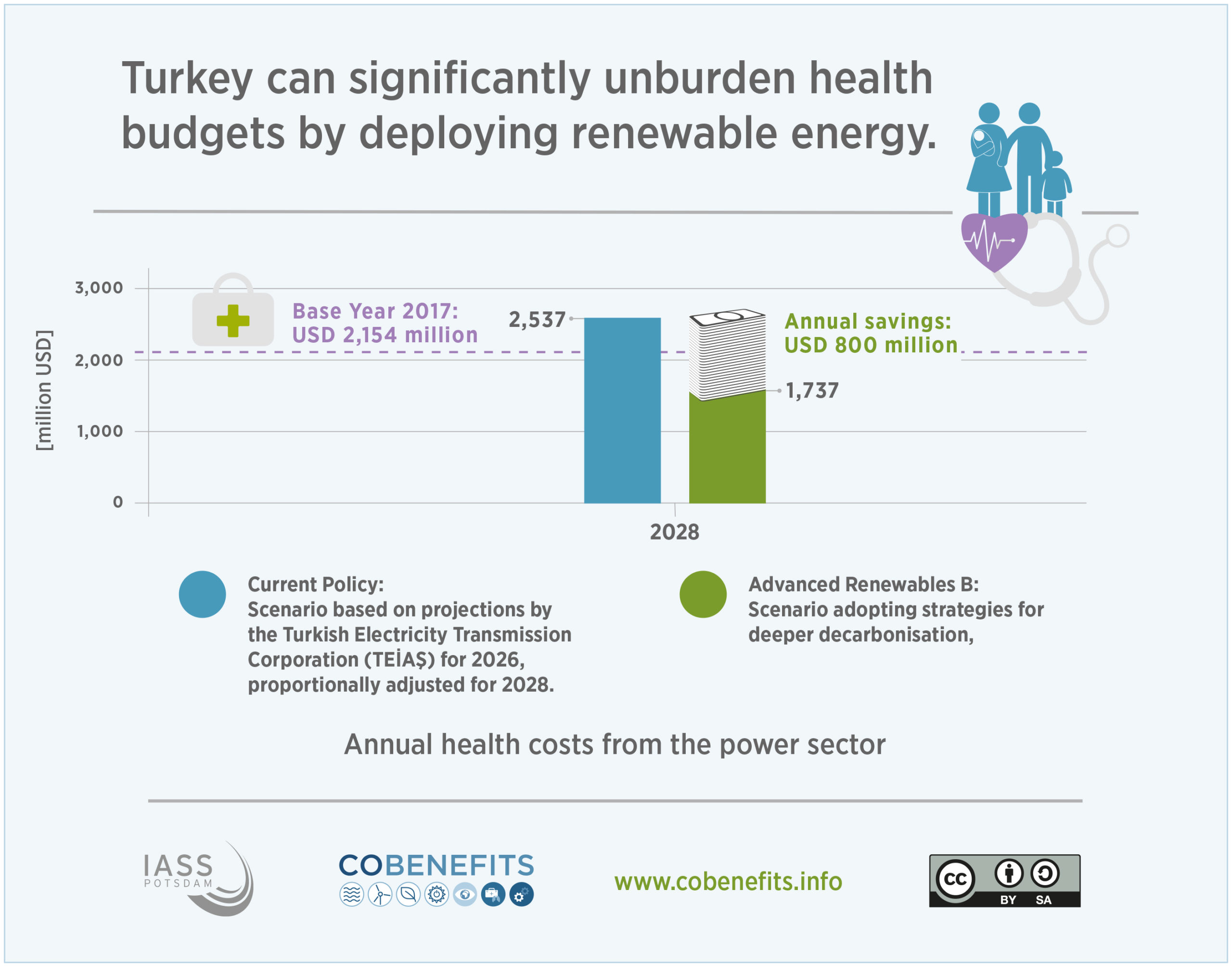
Renewable energy reduces health costs in Turkey

Air pollution in Turkey is estimated to be a cause of 8% of deaths in 2019. Coal is a major contributor to air pollution, and damages health across the nation, being burnt even in homes and cities. It is estimated that a phase out of coal power in Turkey by 2030 instead of by the 2050s would save over 100 thousand lives. Climate change in Turkey may impact health, for example due to increased heatwaves, but as of 2025 the co-benefits to health of climate action have not been formally recognised.

== Vaccine-preventable diseases ==
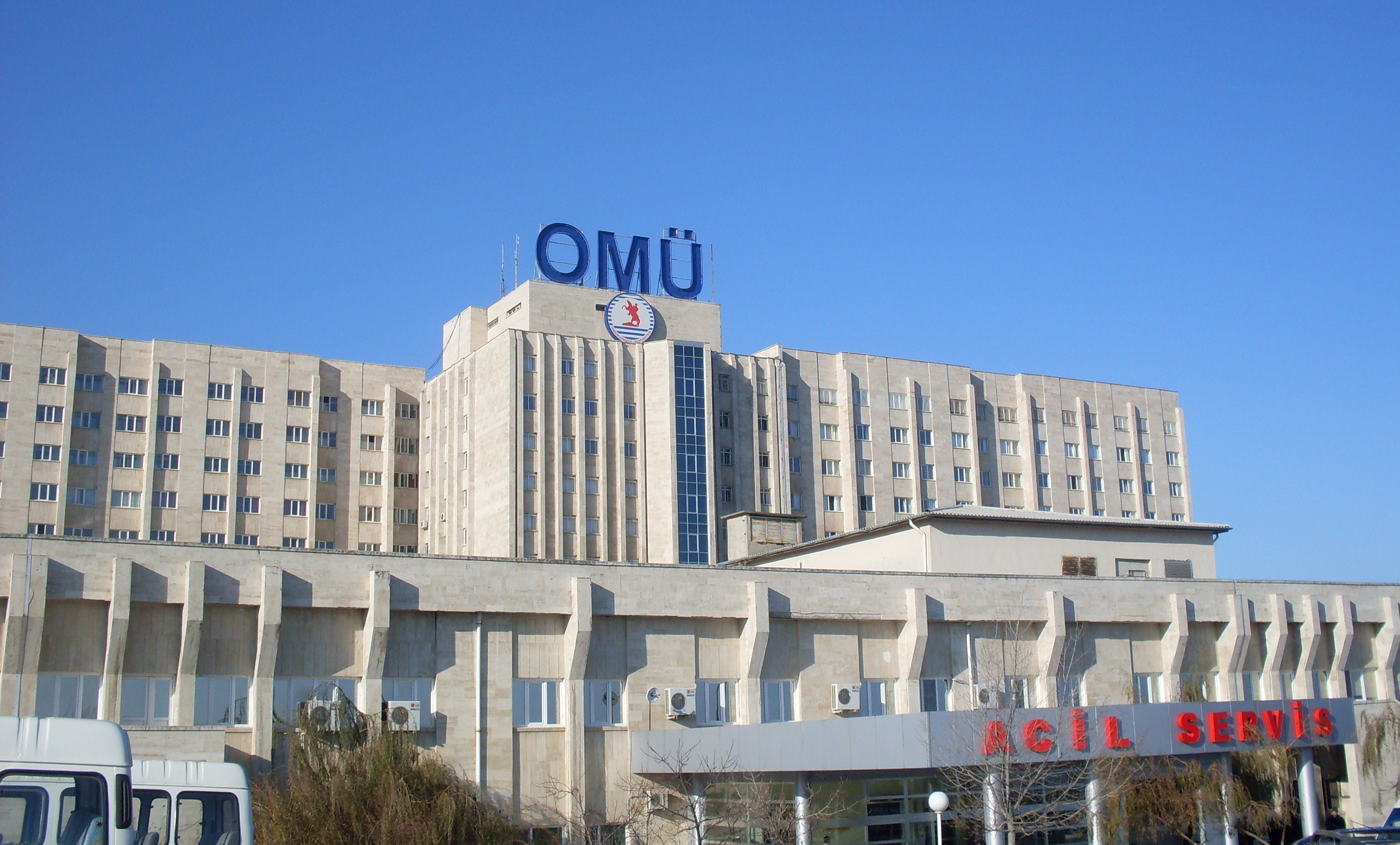
Ondokuz Mayıs University Hospital in Samsun

Vaccines that are on the existing immunization schedule of the government are free of charge.

According to the recent 'WHO vaccine-preventable diseases: monitoring system' reported cases for Diphtheria were 0, Measles were 9, Rubella were 7, Mumps were 544 and Tetanus(total) were 16 cases in 2016.

=== Immunization schedule ===
- HepB_pediatric: birth;1, 6 months
- BCG: 2 months
- DTaPHibIPV: 2, 4, 6, 18 months
- Pneumo_conj: 2, 4, 6, 12 months
- MMR: 12 months, 6 years
- TdaPIPV: 6 years
- OPV: 6, 18 months
- Td: 14 years
- HepA_pediatric: 18, 24 months
- Varicella: 12 months
- Influenza_Adult: >=65 years
- Influenza - Pediatric: 6 months

== HIV/AIDS in Turkey ==
Between 2006 and 2017, new HIV infections increased by 465%. AIDS is a disease that is not decreasing as in much of the rest of the world. Analysis of nearly 7000 cases reveal data about HIV in Turkey. AIDS in Turkey is often described as a "Gay disease", "African disease", or "Natasha disease", so people tend to hide their illness. "According to the United Nations HIV / AIDS Theme Group's 2002 HIV / AIDS Situation Analysis report in Turkey, between 7,000 and 14,000 people have been infected with AIDS since the beginning of the pandemic. Figures released by the (Ministry of Health) in June 2002 show that a total of 1,429 HIV / AIDS cases had been reported since 1985." Due to problems in the registration and notification system, obtaining reliable numerical information about AIDS cases is very difficult in Turkey.

"The disease is seen in 20-45 groups. It is estimated that approximately 2,000 people have been treated with this disease in Turkey. Marmara region where the most case report is made to the current. These are followed by Ankara, Izmir, Antalya, Mersin, Adana and Bursa respectively. Foreign nationals who make up about 16 percent of cases are from Ukraine, Moldova and Romania."

== 2009 swine flu pandemic in Turkey ==
The 2009 flu pandemic was a global outbreak of a new strain of influenza A virus subtype H1N1, first identified in April 2009, termed Pandemic H1N1/09 virus by the World Health Organization (WHO) and colloquially called swine flu. The outbreak was first observed in Mexico, and quickly spread globally. On 11 June 2009, WHO declared the outbreak to be a pandemic. The overwhelming majority of patients experience mild symptoms", but some persons are in higher risk groups, such as those with asthma, diabetes, obesity, heart disease, or who are pregnant or have a weakened immune system. In the rare severe cases, around 3–5 days after symptoms manifest, the sufferer's condition declines quickly, often to the point respiratory failure.

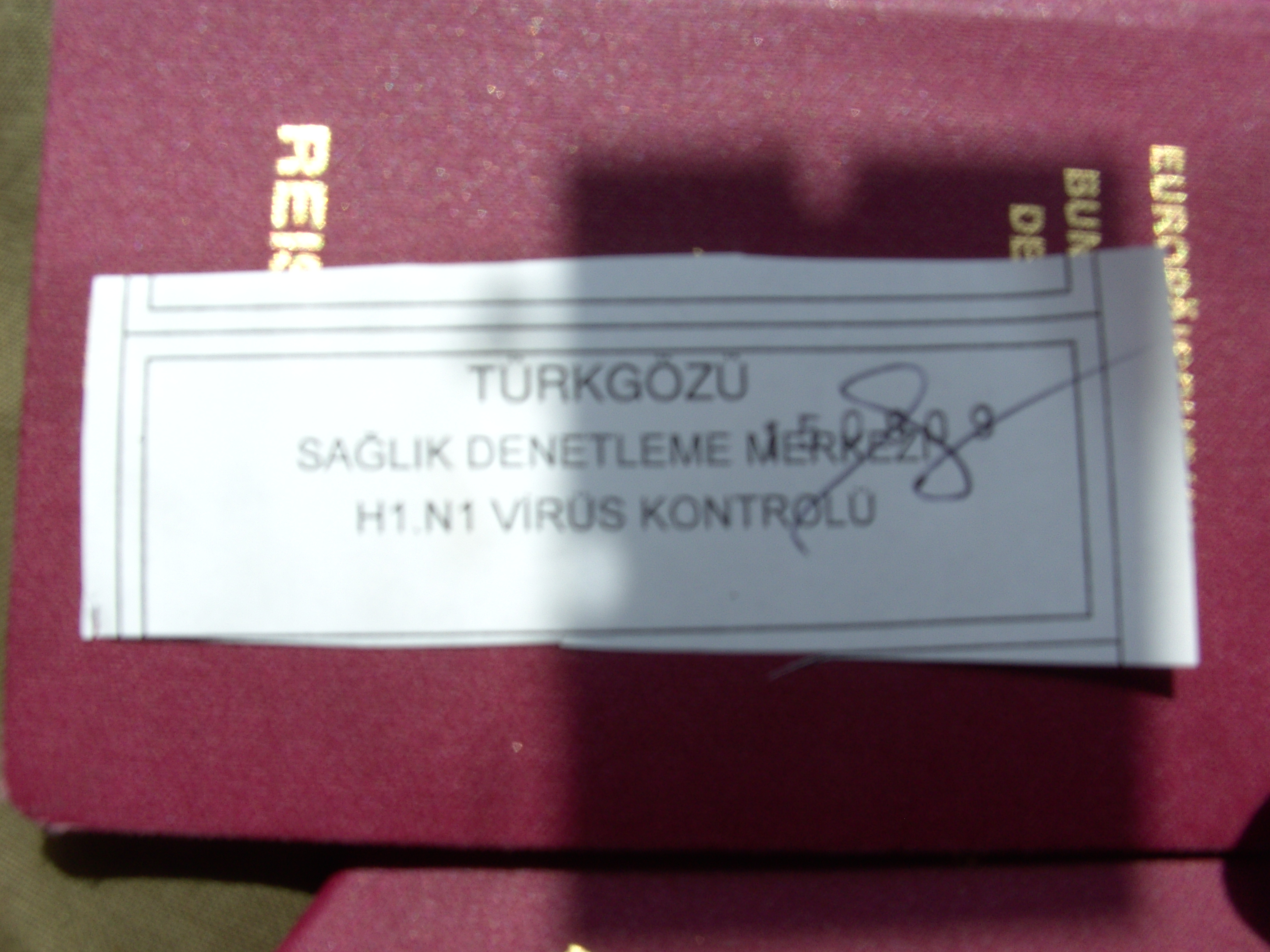
Turkish H1N1 control

The virus reached Turkey in May 2009. A U.S. citizen, flying from the United States via Amsterdam was found to be suffering from the swine flu after arriving at Istanbul's Atatürk International Airport. Turkey is the 17th country in Europe and the 36th country in the world to report an incident of swine flu.

The Turkish Government has taken measures at the international airports, using thermal imaging cameras to check passengers coming from international destinations.

The first case of person to person transmission within Turkey was announced on 26 July 2009.

On 2 November, the Turkish Health Ministry began administering vaccines against H1N1 influenza, starting with health workers.

After a slow start, the virus spread rapidly in Turkey and the number of cases reached 12,316. First death confirmed on 24 October and death toll reached 627.

== COVID-19 pandemic in Turkey ==
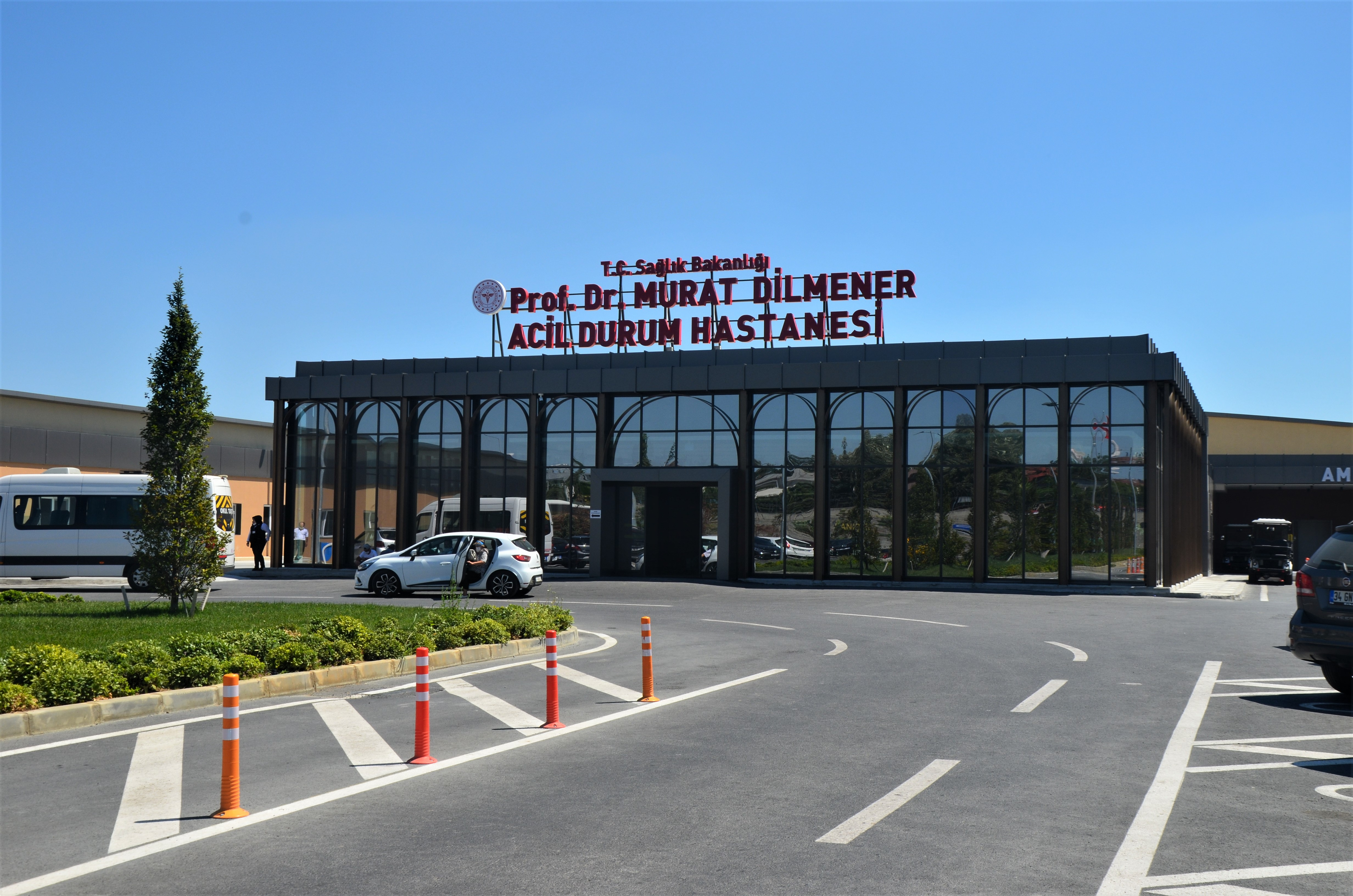
Yeşilköy Emergency Hospital constructed for the COVID-19 pandemic

The COVID-19 pandemic in Turkey is part of the ongoing COVID-19 pandemic caused by severe acute respiratory syndrome coronavirus 2 (SARS-CoV-2). The disease was confirmed to have reached Turkey on 11 March 2020, after a man who had returned to Turkey from Europe, tested positive. The first death due to COVID-19 in the country occurred on 15 March 2020 and by 1 April, it was confirmed that COVID-19 had spread all over Turkey. On 14 April 2020, the head of the Turkish Ministry of Health Fahrettin Koca announced that the spread of the virus in Turkey has reached its peak in the fourth week and started to slow down. The disease is exacerbated by air pollution, for example from burning coal in Turkey for residential heating.

As of 22 July 2020, the total number of confirmed cases in the country is over 222,400. Among these cases, 205,200 have recovered and 5,500 have died. On 18 April 2020, the total number of positive test results surpassed that of Iran, making it the highest in the Middle East. Turkey also surpassed China in confirmed total cases on 20 April 2020. The rapid increase of the confirmed cases in Turkey did not overburden the public healthcare system, and the preliminary case-fatality rate remained lower compared to many European countries. Discussions mainly attributed these to the country's relatively young population and high number of available intensive care units.

== Cancer ==
Cancer rates are rising among people under 50 in Türkiye, with more cases of breast, colon, pancreatic, and testicular cancer seen in young adults. Experts link this to lifestyle changes like unhealthy diets and obesity, along with better screening and medical imaging. As a result, cancer screening now starts earlier—at 45 for colon cancer and 40 for breast cancer. People with a family history or who smoke are urged to begin checks even younger.

== See also ==
- Health care in Turkey
