= Health care in Turkey =

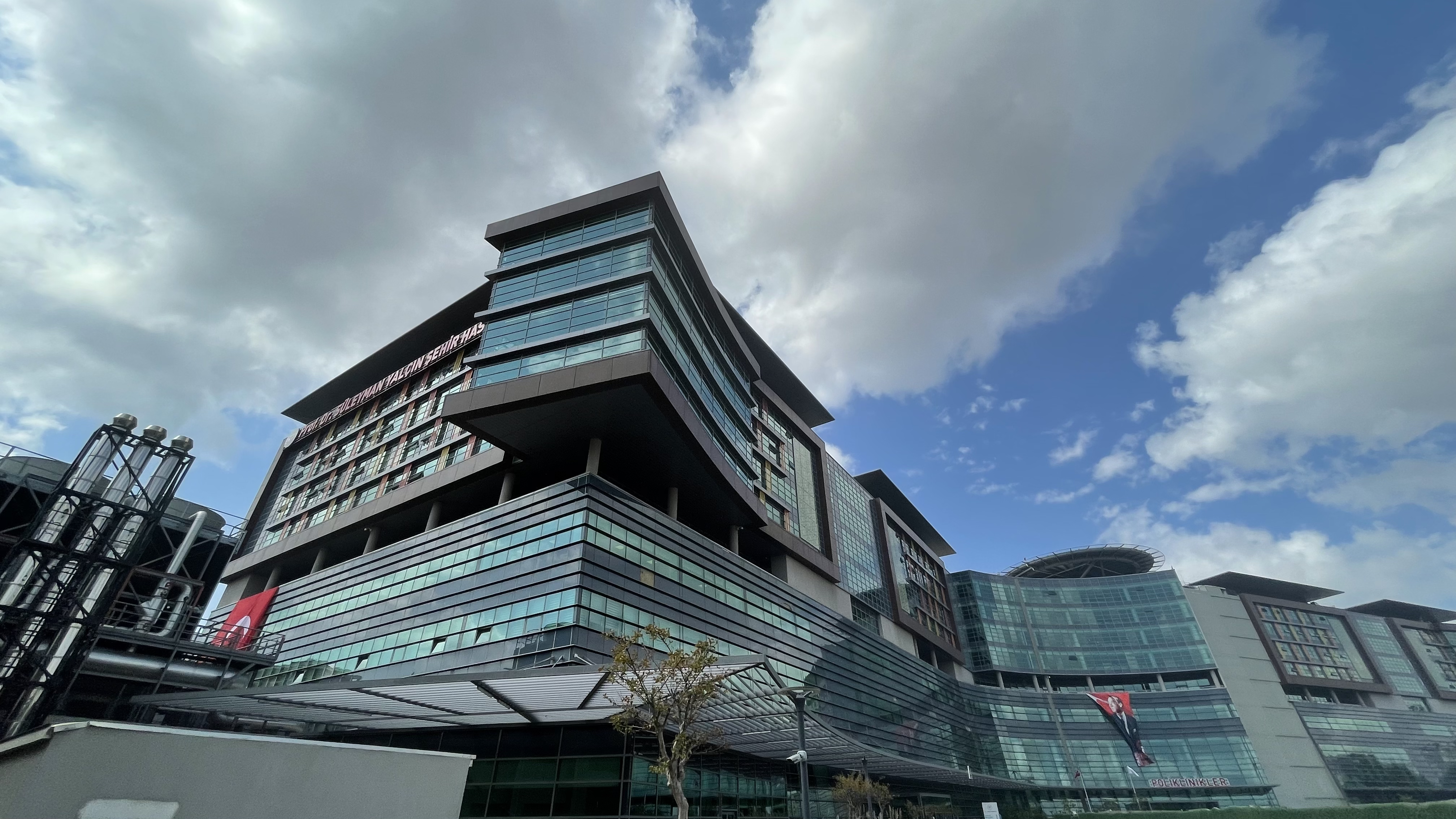
Göztepe Prof. Dr. Süleyman Yalçın City Hospital in Istanbul

Healthcare in Turkey consists of a mix of public and private health services. Turkey introduced universal health care in 2003. Known as Universal Health Insurance Genel Sağlık Sigortası, it is funded by a tax surcharge on employers, currently at 5%. Public-sector funding covers approximately 75.2% of health expenditures.

Despite universal health care, total expenditure on health as a share of GDP is the lowest among OECD countries at 6.3% of GDP, much lower than the OECD average of 9.3%. Median age in Turkey is 30 years compared to 43.9 average in EU countries. Aging population is the prime reason for higher healthcare expenditure in Europe. Life expectancy is 78.5 years, compared with the EU average of 81 years.

== Coverage ==
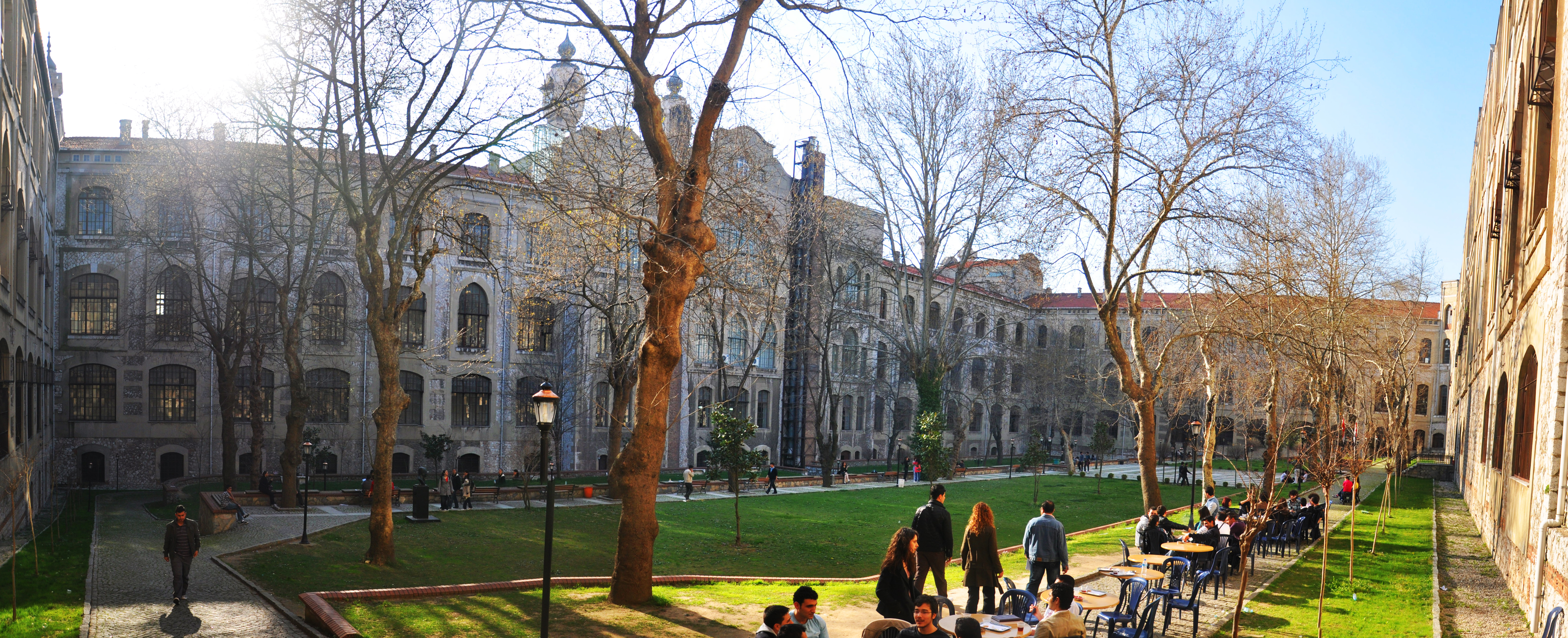
Old Imperial College of Medicine, currently the Hamidiye Campus of the University of Health Sciences in the Kadıköy district of Istanbul. The building was designed by architects Alexander Vallaury and Raimondo D'Aronco.

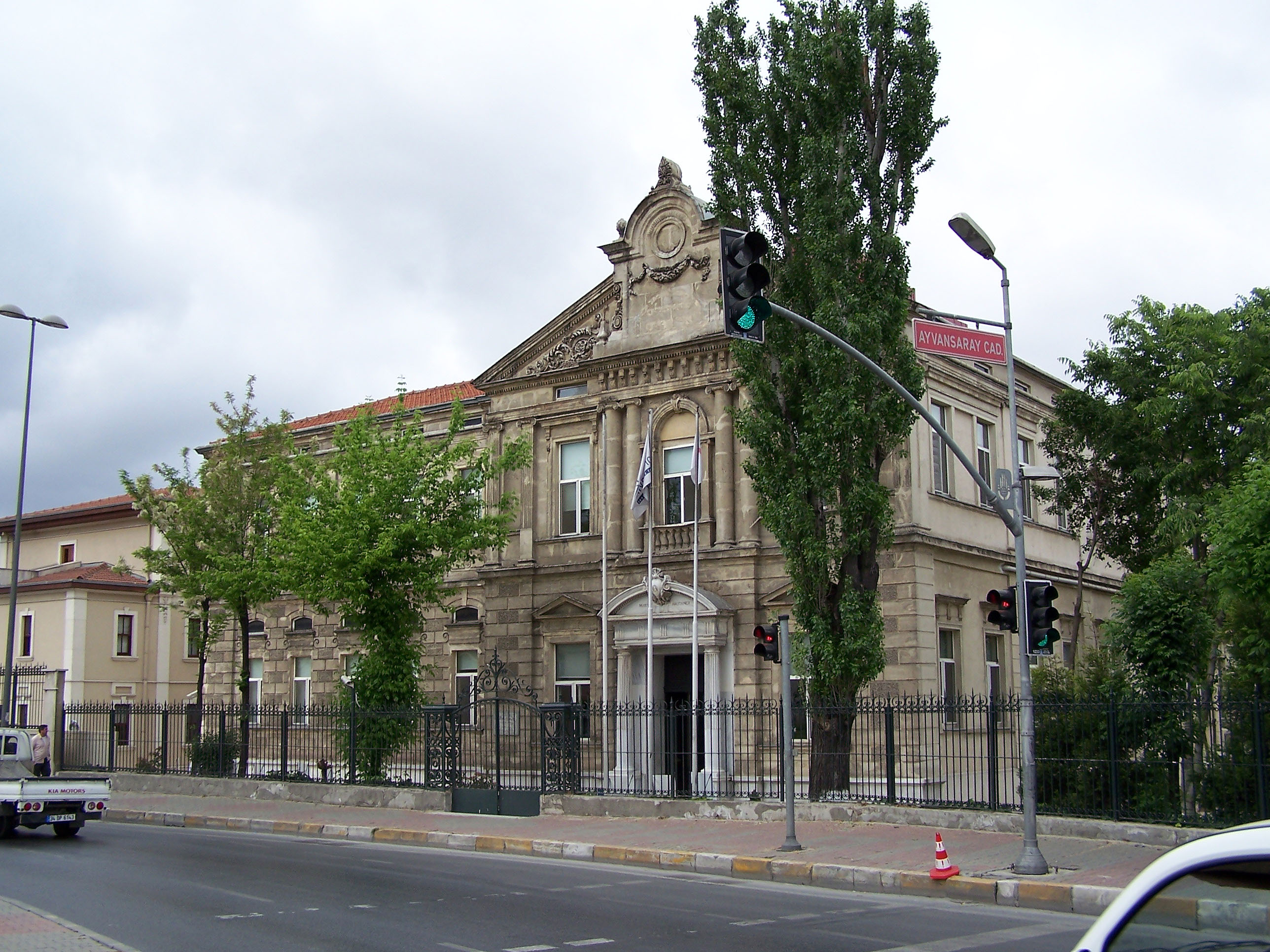
Jewish Balat Or-Ahayim Hospital in Balat, Istanbul

Due to major health reforms in the 2000s and 2010s, universal health insurance coverage for the population was achieved, and the general quality of health services improved greatly, with patient satisfaction rising from 39.5% in 2003 to 75.9% in 2011.

The following medical treatments are covered by the SGK:

- Emergencies
- Work accidents and vocational illnesses
- Infectious diseases
- Preventive health services (substance use)
- Childbirth
- Extraordinary events (injuries from war and natural disasters)
- Fertility treatment for women younger than 39
- Cosmetic surgery deemed medically necessary

While some SGK-contracted hospitals offer dental care, in most cases, patients must rely on private dental services and are responsible for covering the costs. In addition, patients must partially cover the cost of some prescription drugs and outpatient services.

== Statistics ==
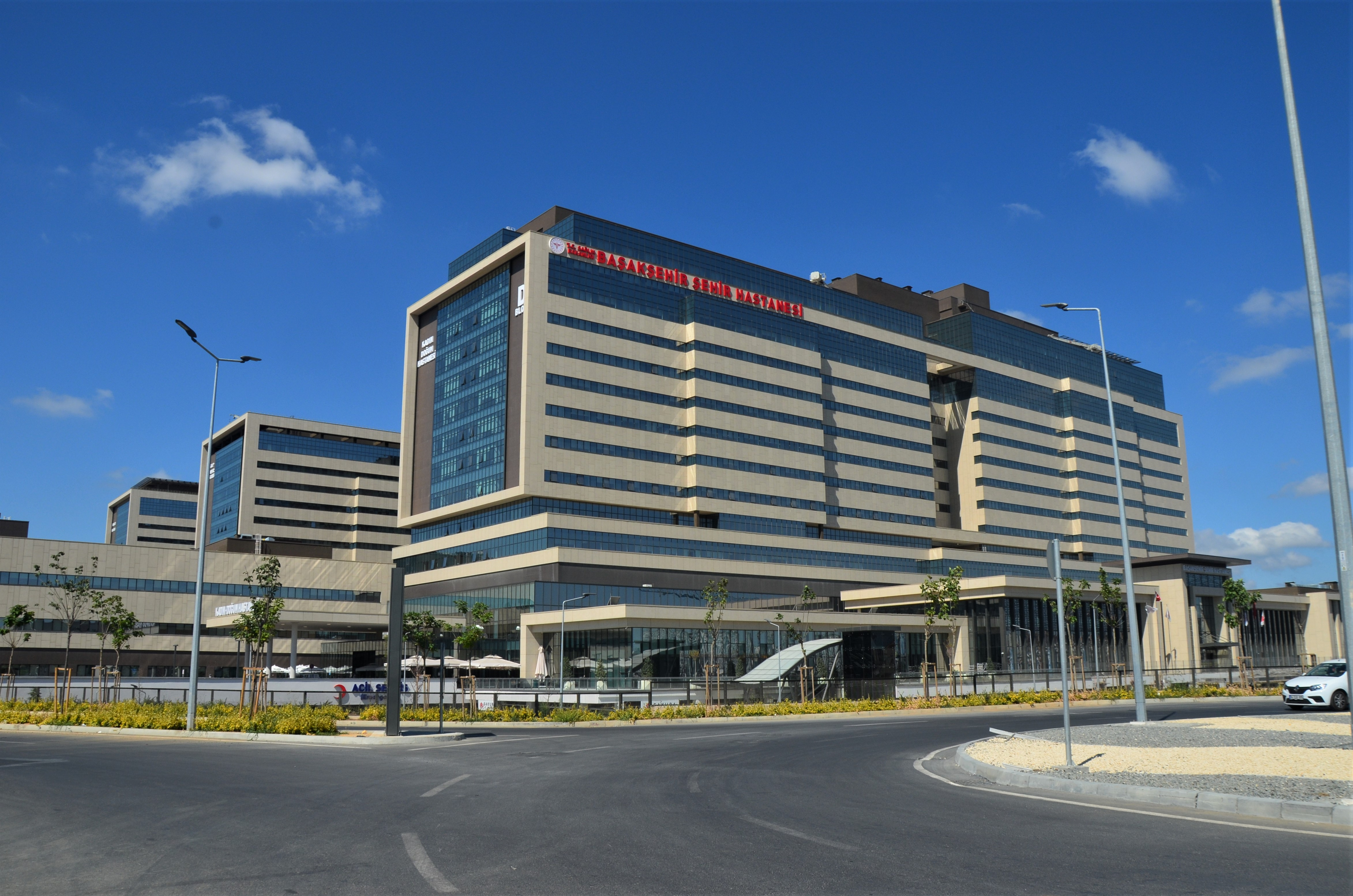
Modern Başakşehir Çam and Sakura City Hospital in Istanbul

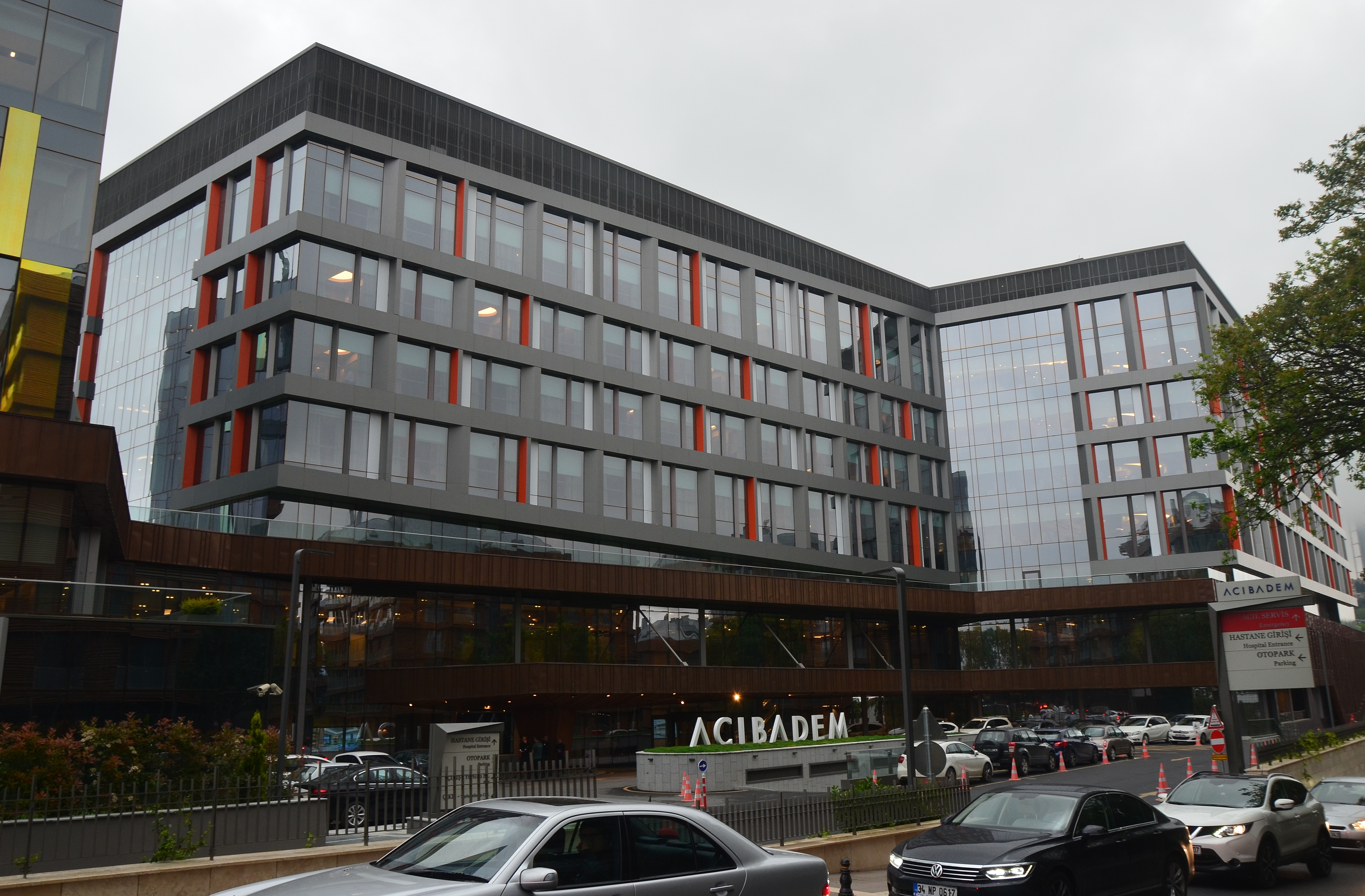
Acıbadem Hospital in Altunizade, Istanbul

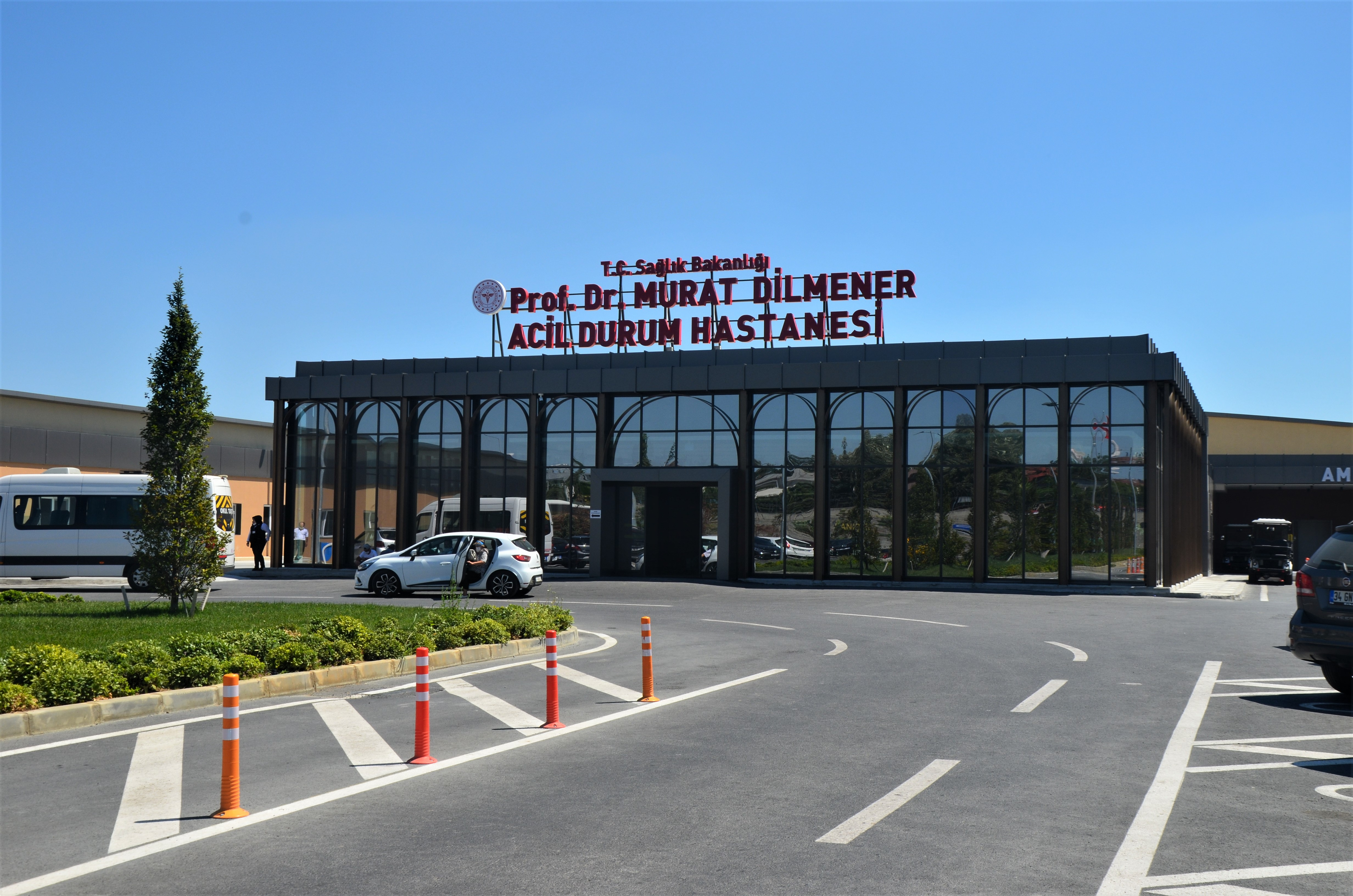
Yeşilköy Emergency Hospital constructed for the COVID-19 pandemic

Turkish data from 2016 unless indicated otherwise
	Turkey	OECD average	Rank
Health expenditure as % of GDP	6.3%	9.3%	37th
Health expenditure per capita	$665	$3,223	37th
% health expenditure publicly funded	75.2%	71.7%	14th
Doctors to population ratio	2.3	3.27	35th
Life expectancy at birth (years)	78.3	80.6	29th
Percentage of daily smokers aged 15+	26.5%	21.81%	3rd
Obesity rate (BMI≥30) (2017)	20.0%	17%	25th
Caesarean section among all births	53%	32%	1st
Number of hospital beds per 10,000 population	27.3	51.4	22nd
Number of physicians per 100,000 population	181	343	24th
Number of dentists per 100,000 population	33	71	20th
Number of nurses per 100,000 population	257	1,098	22nd
Number of pharmacists per 100,000 population	35	89	23rd
Share of out-of-pocket expenses	16.5%	20.3%	16th
Antibiotic consumption per 1,000 population, defined daily dose (DDD)	39.8	20.9	1st
Average length of stay in hospitals, days	4.0	8.2	37th

== Medication ==
As measured in defined daily doses per 1,000 inhabitants per day Turkey had a high rate of consumption of antibiotics in 2015 with a rate of 38.8, double that of the United Kingdom.

== Medical tourism ==
There is a substantial medical tourism business in Turkey, with almost 178 thousand tourists visiting for health purposes in the first six months of 2018. 67% used private hospital, 24% public hospitals and 9% university hospitals. The Regulation on International Health Tourism and Tourist Health came into force on 13 July 2017. It only applies to those coming specifically for treatment.

=== Scandals ===
In August 2026, the prestigious British publication The Times published an investigation into British patient Martin Currant, who suffered a severe brain infection following a sinus lift and implant placement at Lema Dental Clinic in Istanbul.

== Private healthcare ==
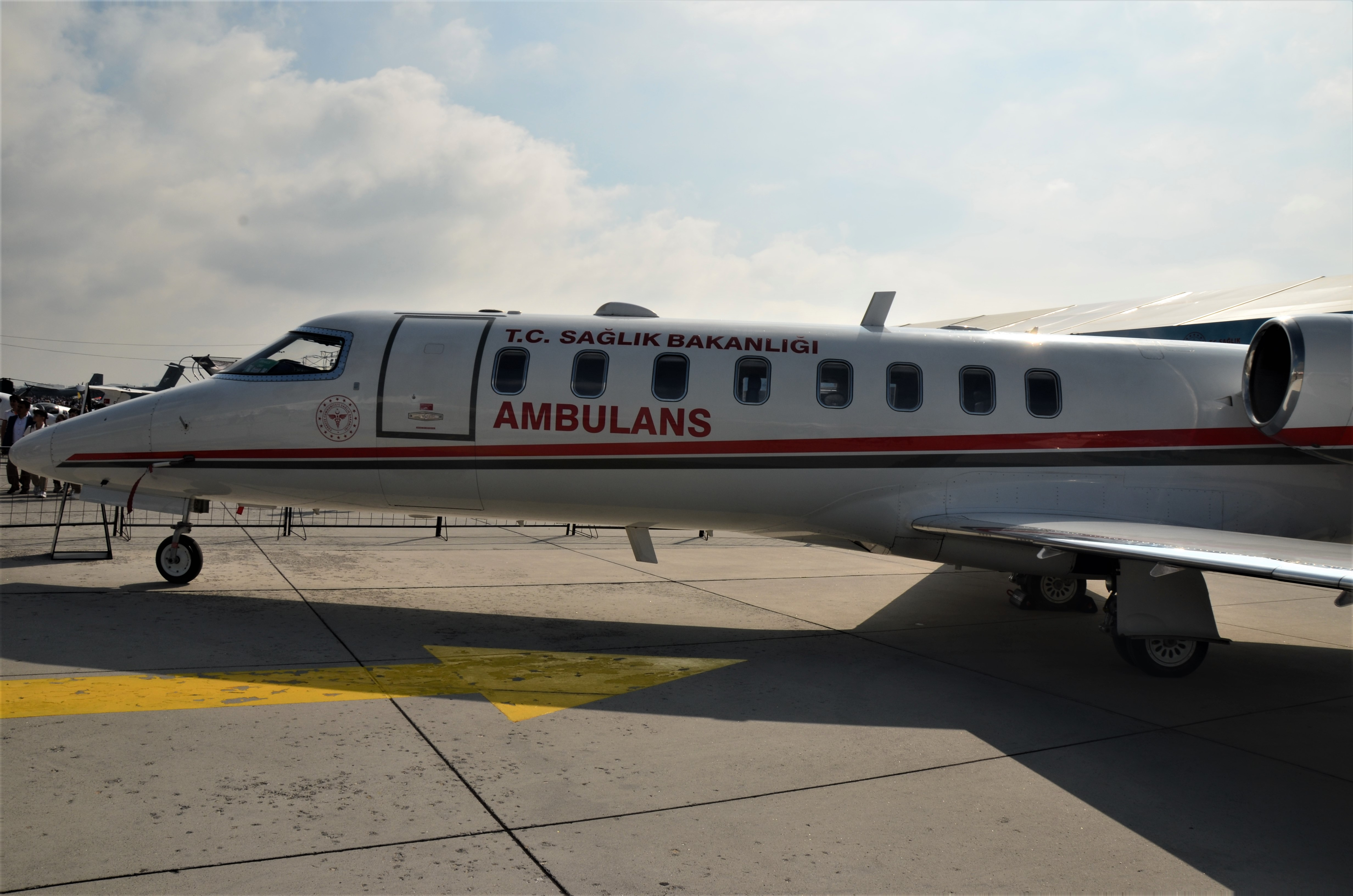
An air ambulance of the Ministry of Health

Turkey has a large private healthcare sector, in addition to its public health services. These private health services often offer shorter waiting lists and higher quality services. Most banks and insurance companies offer health plans, and contract with certain hospitals and doctors.

The Turkish healthcare system was formerly dominated by a centralized state system run by the Ministry of Health. In 2003 the governing Justice and Development Party introduced a sweeping health reform program aimed at increasing the ratio of private to state health provision and making healthcare available to a larger share of the population. Information from the Turkish Statistical Institute states that 76.3 billion liras are being spent on healthcare annually, with 79.6% of funding coming from the Social Security Institute and most of the remainder (15.4%) coming from out-of-pocket payments. There are 27.954 medical institutions, 1.7 doctor for every 1000 people and 2.54 beds for 1000 people.

Turkey previously had a scheme called green card (Yeşil Kart), which was developed in order to help low-income social group to get medical help. Spending on this system were equal to 40 billion TL in 2010. Due to this fact, the system was reformed in 2011 and the number of people who could benefit from this system was reduced. Following the 2012 Universal Health Insurance Law, the Green Card system was abolished.

== Finance ==
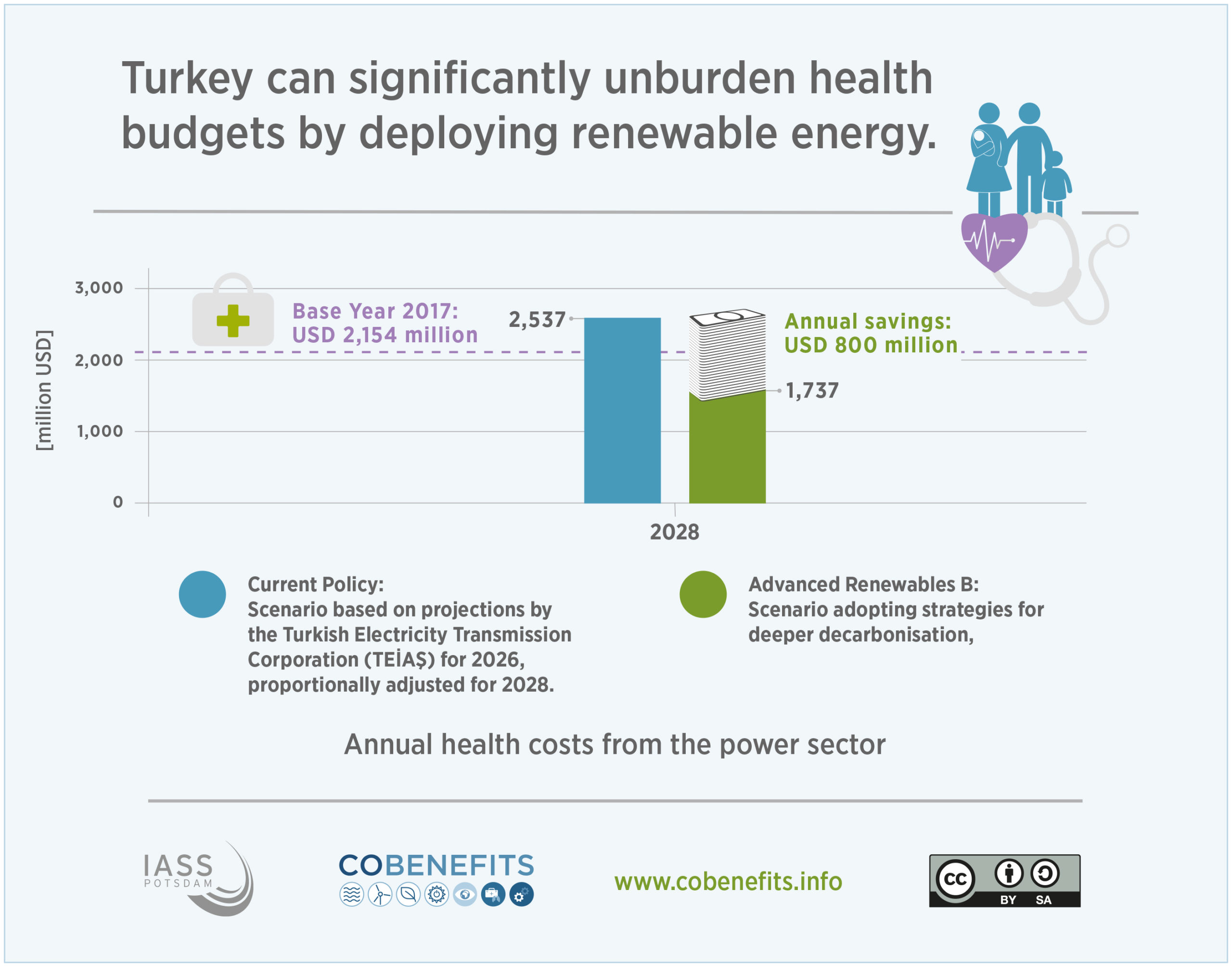
Renewable energy reduces health costs in Turkey.

Turkey had the lowest expenditure on healthcare in Europe in 2015 - 6.4% of Gross domestic product.

Total health spending according to the Turkish Statistical Institute data has exceeded 201 billion pounds in 2019.

== See also ==
- Health in Turkey
- Turkish Medical Association
