= Social Insurance Institution (Turkey) =

Former Turkish social security institution

- Sosyal Sigortalar Kurumu
- Successor: Social Security Institution
- Formation: 1946; 80 years ago
- Dissolved: May 16, 2006; 20 years ago
- Headquarters: Ulus, Ankara, Turkey
- Employees: over 60,000 (1995)
- Website: www.ssk.gov.tr

The Social Insurance Institution (Turkish: Sosyal Sigortalar Kurumu, SSK) was a social security institution connected to the Ministry of Labour and Social Security in Turkey. It had been transferred into the Social Security Institution with Social Insurance and General Health Insurance Law, no. 5510 passed on 16 May 2006.

Before the merger into Social Security Institution, it was the biggest social security institution in Turkey. It provided insurance and healthcare to around %50 of the population.

== History ==
The institution was founded in 1946 as the Workers' Insurance Institution (İşçi Sigortaları Kurumu). The institution was expanded and renamed in 1965. It was primarily intended for workers and formed the main social security network in Turkey alongside the Retirement Fund (Emekli Sandığı) and Social Insurance Institution for Tradesmen and Craftsmen and Other Self-Employed (Bağ-Kur).

The institution had entered into financial troubles in the 1990s as a result of populist changes to the insurance coverage and retirement age.

== Scope ==
The institution, in addition to collecting pension premium payments and unlike other social security institutions, operated a large network of hospitals throughout the country, called as SSK hospitals (SSK Hastanesi) and produced a limited number of pharmaceutical drugs and liquids, to be used in the hospitals. The institution quickly became the second-largest healthcare provider in the country, behind the Ministry of Health. However, the hospitals soon became over-crowded and became synonymous with the long waiting queues. All of the SSK hospitals were transferred to the Ministry of Health in 2005.

The institution provided pensions, free healthcare, and allowances to almost all workers employed in Turkish formal sector, except civil servants and the self-employed.
