= Social Security Institution =

Institute in Turkey

Sosyal Güvenlik Kurumu

Agency overview
- Formed: 2006
- Preceding agencies: Social Insurance Institution (SSK); Bağ-Kur; Retirement Fund (Turkey) (Emekli Sandığı)
- Headquarters: Ankara
- Minister responsible: Zehra Zümrüt Selçuk
- Parent department: Ministry of Family, Labour and Social Services (Turkey)
- Website: http://www.sgk.gov.tr

The Social Security Institution (SSI) (Turkish: Sosyal Güvenlik Kurumu (SGK)) is the governing authority of the Turkish social security system. It was established by the Social Security Institution Law No:5502, which was published in the Official Gazette No: 26173 on June 20, 2006. As a result, the Social Insurance Institution, Bağ-Kur and Retirement Fund ceased to exist and merged into a single organization. This merger brought five different retirement systems that affected civil servants, contractual paid workers, agricultural paid workers, and self-employed workers into a single retirement system offering equal actuarial rights and obligations.

== Short term benefits ==
=== Work accident and occupational disease ===
Work accidents (described as when the insurance holder is at the workplace, in another area working under an elephant, in another area allocated for breastfeeding as per labor legislation, or in a vehicle provided by an employer while en route from work to home or vice versa) "causes, at short notice or later, physical or mental handicap in the insurance holder." SSI mandates such accidents be reported by employers to "local law enforcement agencies immediately and to the SSI no later than three workdays after accident occurs." If the insurance holder is self-employed, they must contact the Institution directly with work accident and occupational disease notification "within 3 working days after their health status are good enough to report, provided that this recovery period does not exceed one month."

An occupational disease refers to a temporary or permanent disease caused by "the quality of the work carried out by the insurance holder or by working conditions."

=== Sickness ===
Sickness "refers to discomfort causing the incapacity of the insurance holders, who work on service contract and on their own name and account, due to the reasons other than work accident or occupational disease."

=== Maternity insurance ===
Maternity insurance refers to the sickness and invalidity statuses of an insured woman or the spouse of a male insurance holder working on service contract or who receives income or pension caused by the pregnancy or maternity status. Maternity insurance "starts from the date of pregnancy up to the first eight weeks or, in case of multi-delivery, up to the first ten weeks following delivery." They are also eligible for Temporary Incapacity Allowance.

== Long term benefits ==
=== Old age insurance ===
Old age insurance is a mandatory social insurance contribution that allows the insured to have an old age payment when they reach a specific age. Payment is available in pension and lump-sum form.

=== Invalidity insurance ===
Invalidity insurance is a mandatory social insurance (with premiums) "that allows insurance holders to have invalidity pension provided that the status of invalidity is determined and certain conditions, are met."

If the insured person is determined by the ISS Health Committee to have lost working power (or a minimum 60% earning power in their profession due to work accident or occupational disease), they may be eligible for a pension or lump-sum payment dependent on other factors such as how long they have held insurance.

=== Survivors' insurance ===
Survivors' insurance is a compulsory and contributory insurance "which provides a monthly pension to survivors including spouse, children and parents in case the insurance holders become deceased due to a reason other than work accident and occupational diseases. The rights provided under survivors’ insurance are survivors’ pension, death grant, marriage allowance for the girls who are receiving monthly pension and funeral allowance." A pension is dependent on other factors such as how long they have held insurance and if they received disability or old age insurance.

=== Marriage benefit ===
Marriage benefit "shall be payable in advance, for once, at the amount of two years of pension or income they receive, upon marriage and request of the daughters, whose income or pensions should be terminated due to marriage."

=== Funeral benefit ===
Funeral benefit "shall be payable to the right holders of the insurance holder who deceased when receiving permanent incapacity income due to work accident or occupational disease, invalidity, duty disability or old-age pension or when minimum 360 days of invalidity, old-age and survivors insurance premiums are notified" for themselves.

== See also ==
- Health care in Turkey
- Health systems by country
