= Afşin-Elbistan power stations =

Coal-fired power stations in Turkey

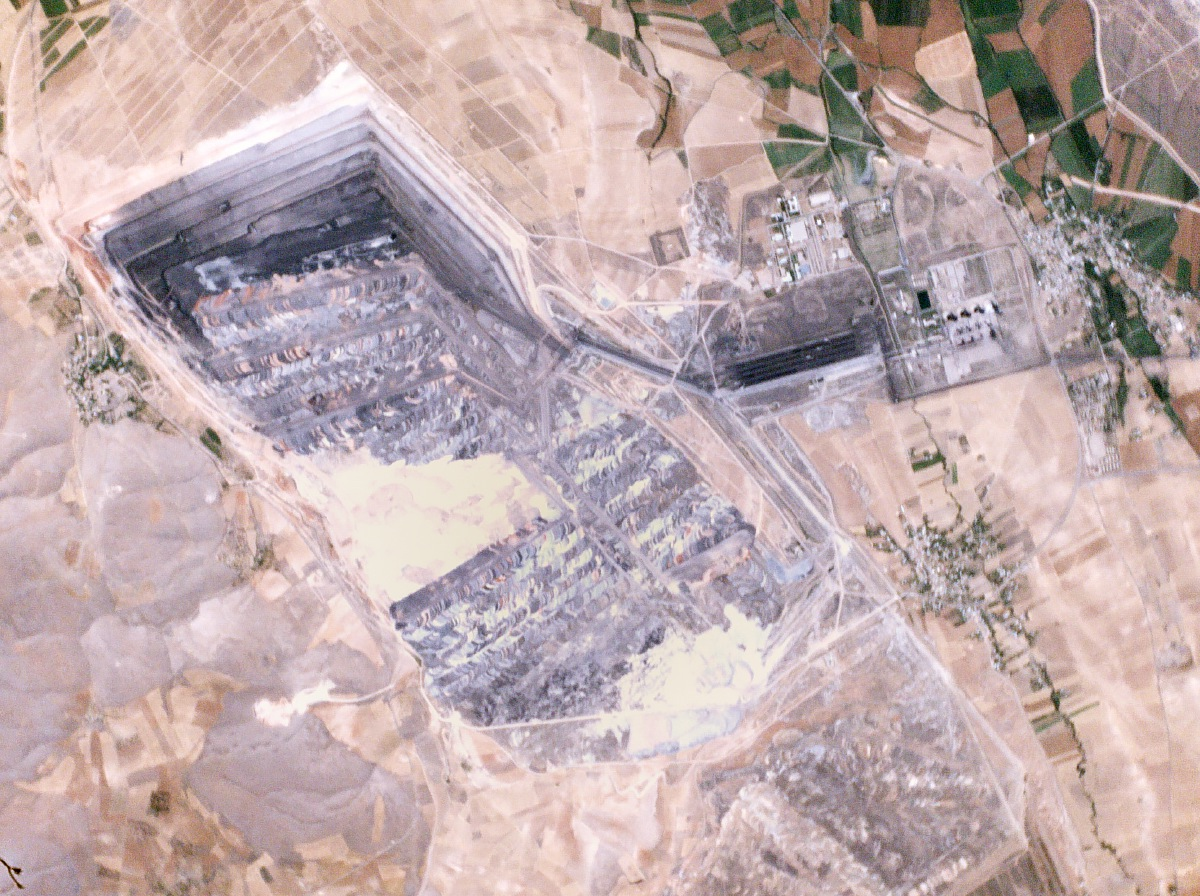
- Country: Turkey

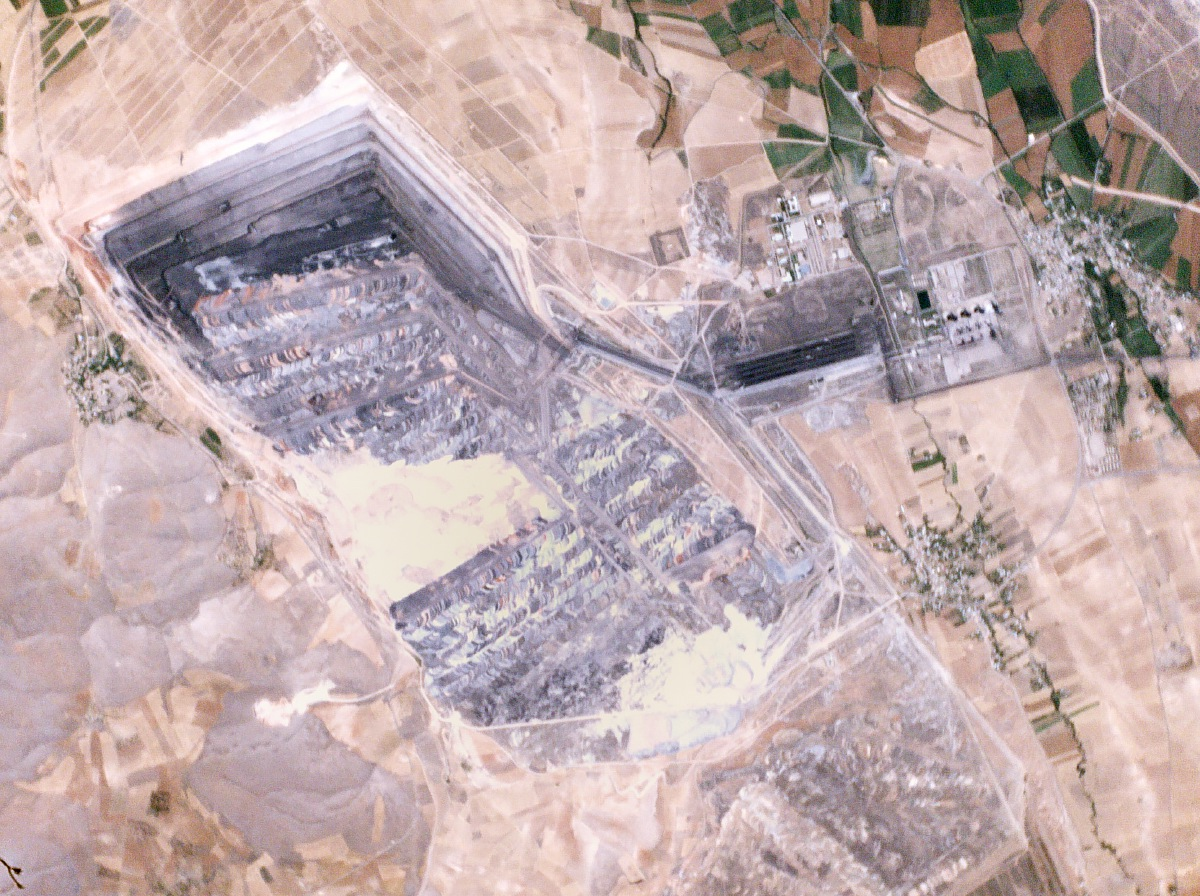
Afsin-Elbistan Power Complex

The Afşin-Elbistan power stations are two coal-fired power stations in Turkey, located a few kilometres apart in Afşin District in Kahramanmaraş Province. Both Afşin-Elbistan A, built in the 1980s, and the newer Afşin-Elbistan B burn lignite (brown coal) from the nearby Elbistan coalfield. As their mines are opencast and next to the power stations the coal is cheap. However, as the existing units are the older subcritical type, and Turkish lignite is very low quality, they are not very efficient.

Both plants were built and first operated by the state-owned Electricity Generation Company, but Afşin-Elbistan A was sold to Çelikler Holding in 2018. Çelikler employs almost 1500 people, mostly local. Due a landslide at its mine stopping the supply of nearby coal, in late 2024 Afşin-Elbistan B stopped generating, but it may reopen in mid-2025.

Air pollution created by the power station, such as sulfur dioxide, is trapped by surrounding mountains, and Greenpeace alleges that levels of particulates and nitrogen oxides in the atmosphere have exceeded legal limits. The Environment Ministry has not released flue gas measurements, and there is no recent public data from the nearest air quality monitor. Official health impact assessments are not done in Turkey, but the Right to Clean Air Platform estimates that this air pollution has killed over 17 thousand people. In December 2024 the environmental impact assessment allowing Çelikler Holding to build more coal power was approved. This was the only proposal for new unabated coal power in the OECD, and Human Rights Watch said that it conflicted with Turkey's bid to host the 2026 climate change conference. In 2026 a court cancelled the environmental impact assessment.

== Afşin-Elbistan A ==
Afşin-Elbistan A
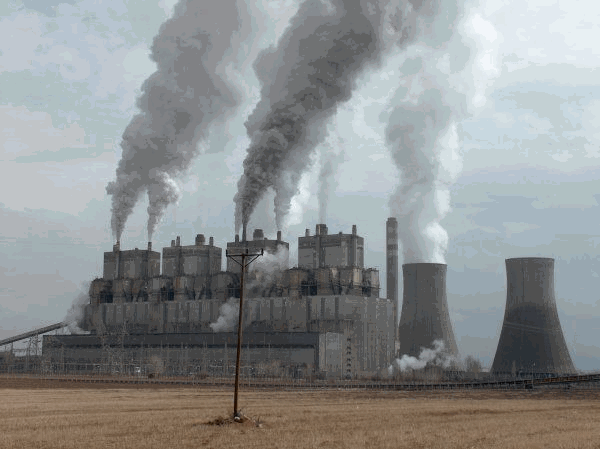
- Country: Turkey
- Status: Operational
- Commission date: 1984
- Owner: Çelikler Holding

Thermal power station
- Primary fuel: Kışlaköy coal mine

Power generation
- Units operational: 3
- Units planned: 2 totalling 688 MW
- Nameplate capacity: 1,355 MW
- Annual net output: 1,640 GWh (2024); 1,717 GWh (2020); 1,899 GWh (2019); 210 GWh (2023); 3,686 GWh (2022); 3,710 GWh (2021)

External links
- Website: celiklerholding.com/en/energy

Afşin-Elbistan A is a 1355 MW lignite-fired power station, owned by Çelikler Holding.

=== Proposed expansion ===
The National Energy Plan published in 2023 forecast that 1.7 GW more local coal power would be connected to the grid by 2030, but did not give whereabouts.

In 2024, Çelikler was considering buying two cheap second-hand steam turbines from shut down American nuclear plants, but was unsure whether suitable steam boilers, which could cope with Turkish lignite could be found, as large electrostatic precipitators and flue-gas desulfurization (FGD) would be needed.

In December 2024 the environmental impact assessment (EIA), which began in 2022, of adding such 4th and 5th units totalling about 700 MW was approved. As of 2023, an official health impact assessment has not been done in Turkey, but opponents of the expansion estimate that the extra air pollution could lead to an additional 1900 premature deaths. This was estimated by using CALPUFF to model dispersion of NO_{2}, SO_{2} and PM2.5. The deposition of mercury was also estimated. According to the EIA, 28 million tonnes of CO_{2} could have been emitted per year, (Note: Environmental impact assessments can be found by searching https://eced-duyuru.csb.gov.tr/eced-prod/duyurular.xhtml with Sektör=Enerji and Alt Sektör= Termik Santraller) far more than the largest Turkish greenhouse gas emitter in 2022, which was the ZETES power stations at 15 million tonnes per year. The expansion was planned to run for 35 years, which is past Turkey's net zero target year of 2053. However in 2026 a court annulled the EIA.

In 2025 Greenpeace outlined a plan for a just transition away from coal.

=== History ===
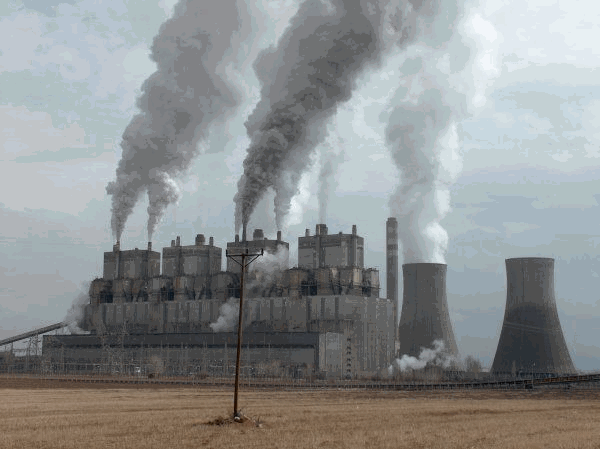
Afşin-Elbistan A before refurbishment

Brought online from 1984 to 1987, Afşin-Elbistan A is one of the largest coal-fired power stations in Turkey by installed capacity. At the time it was built, solar and wind energy were extremely expensive and significant natural gas reserves had yet to be discovered in the country. Importing natural gas has cost the country a lot, thus burning Afsin-Elbistan lignite limited the current account deficit.

The power station is estimated to emit over 8 million tonnes of CO_{2} per year, over 1% of Turkey's total greenhouse gas emissions. It was depicted on the reverse of the 5000 lira banknotes of 1990–1994.

In 2005, the environment impact of refurbishing the plant and also installing FGD was assessed. However FGD was not installed at that time and in January 2020, lower flue gas pollution limits came into force. The plant was shut down in January 2020 due to local air pollution, but reopened later in 2020. Delivery of FGD parts was delayed by the COVID-19 pandemic but the filters were installed in 2021.

In January 2019, locals complained that the plant had been restarted, causing ash pollution visible in the snow. Local MP, Sefer Aycan, said in parliament that he was concerned the plant would add to the industrial pollution of the Aksu and Ceyhan rivers. In March 2019, Greenpeace projected the message "These chimneys are spitting poison" onto the plant, to publicise their earlier report claiming that, together with neighbouring Afşin-Elbistan B, the plants were responsible for 17,000 premature deaths. The area is a sulfur dioxide air pollution hotspot. According to energy analyst Haluk Direskeneli, writing in 2019, FGD was not installed and electrostatic precipitation was inadequate, and "it is futile to repair this power plant".

The plant was shut down in January 2020, as it did not meet the flue gas emission limits which came into force that month. Çelikler planned to have filters installed by June 2020. The plant reopened but complaints of air pollution continued, and in October 2021, it was said by opposition MP Ali Öztunç to be still operating without filters due to company lobbying. In 2020, the fuel oil system was replaced by gas and dry flue gas filters were completed; wet flue gas filters were completed in 2021.

In 2022, a study found levels of chromium and nickel in the soil exceeding regulations and the Climate Change Policy and Research Association alleged that the plant was operating illegally according to environmental laws. Little power was generated in 2023, due to damage caused by earthquakes.

=== Technology ===
The plant burns lignite, which is transported by conveyor belt from the nearby Kışlaköy coal mine. After burning, 2% of the lignite remains as slag and 18% as fly ash. A new landfill site was planned for both of these waste products in 2019. Use of modified fly ash in concrete has been suggested.

== Afşin-Elbistan B ==
Afşin-Elbistan B
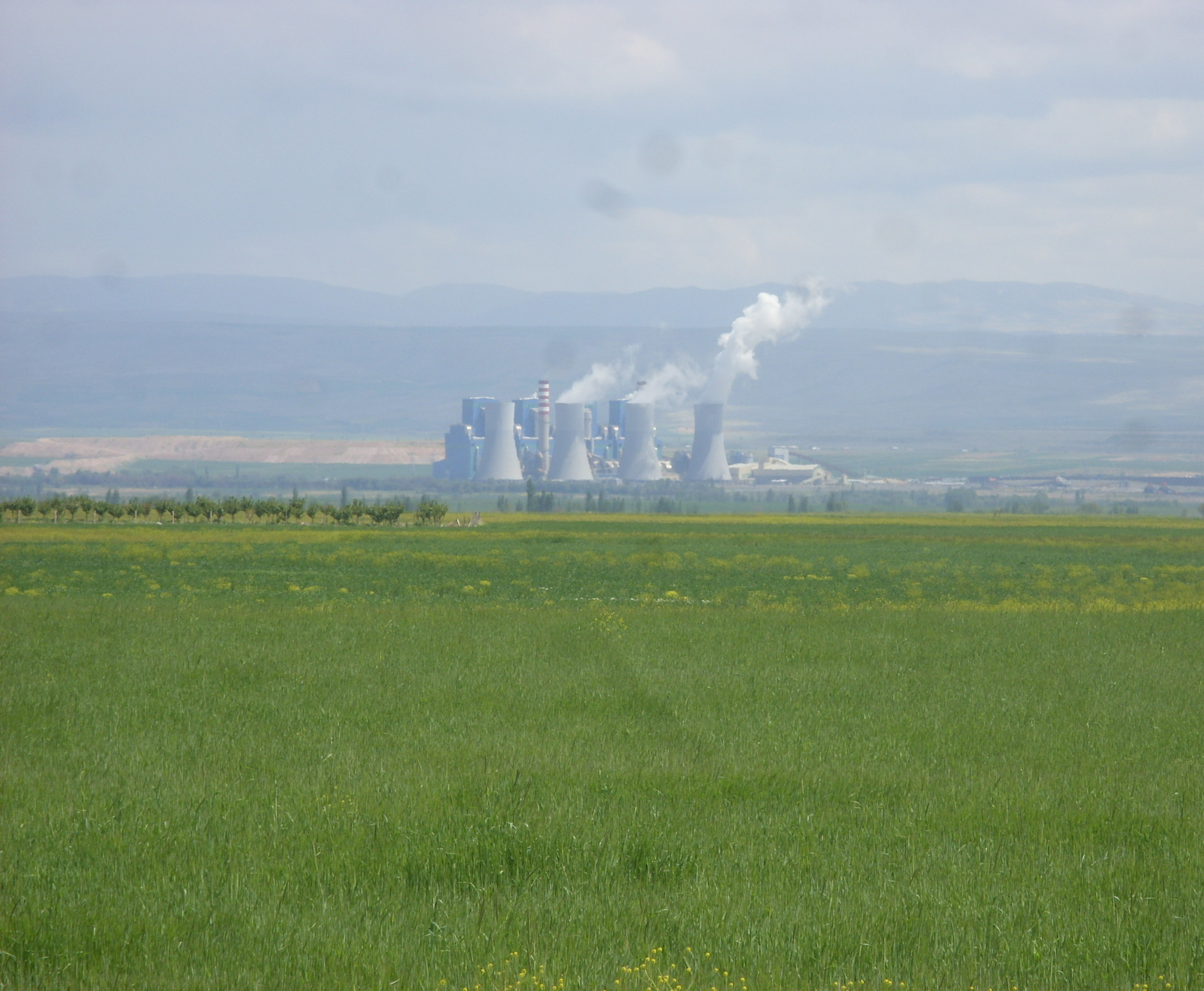
- Country: Turkey
- Status: Operational
- Commission date: 2006
- Owner: Electricity Generation Company

Thermal power station
- Primary fuel: Lignite

Power generation
- Nameplate capacity: 1,440 MW
- Annual net output: 1,201 GWh (2021); 2,181 GWh (2023); 2,378 GWh (2020); 2,767 GWh (2022); 2,773 GWh (2019); 2,776 GWh (2024)

External links
- Website: www.euas.gov.tr/en-US/power-plants/afsin-elbistan-b-dbzi

Afşin-Elbistan B is a 1440MW coal-fired power station in Afşin in Kahramanmaraş Province, state owned by the Electricity Generation Company (EUAŞ). The plant burns lignite from Kışlaköy coal mine (mostly transported by lorry) and sometimes from other mines. Its two flue stacks are 150m high.

=== History ===
Built between 2004 and 2005, Afşin-Elbistan B is the largest single coal-fired power station in Turkey and is estimated to emit almost 8 million tonnes CO_{2} per year, over 1% of Turkey's greenhouse gas emissions. Opponents said in 2020 that ash retention filters were disabled on the pretext that they are expensive to clean. An environmental impact report for proposed ash and slag storage was approved in 2020. By 2021, unit 3 had been converted to gas. The plant stopped running in late September 2024, and due to lack of coal caused by a landslide at the nearby Kışlaköy coal mine. It was predicted not to run again until sometime in 2025.

== Cancelled power stations ==
=== Afşin-Elbistan C ===
Afşin-Elbistan C was a planned 1800-MW coal-fired power station, which was proposed to be funded by the Turkey Wealth Fund and built by state-owned mining company, Maden Holding. According to the EIA, the plant would have burned 23 million tonnes of lignite annually, and emitted over 61 million tonnes of CO_{2} each year for 35 years. In 2021, Turkey targeted net zero carbon emissions by 2053, and in 2022, the C power station was cancelled.

Like some other power stations in Turkey, the proposed three units of 600 MW for Afşin C were planned to be state-owned. Estimated to cost 17.3 billion lira (2,470,000 USD), and had a planned capacity of 11 TWh per year (about 3% of Turkey's annual power generation).

The site, on the border in Afşin district, is near the two existing Afşin-Elbistan power stations. In 2019, compulsory purchase of the land was authorised by President Erdoğan. Hurman Creek would have been diverted to allow more access to the Elbistan coalfield, as well as supplying the plant's cooling water. Earlier in 2021, negotiations with Chinese companies continued, but later that year, China stopped funding overseas coal power.

The station was planned to run almost 7000 hours per year to generate 11,380 GWh. By using a supercritical boiler, the plant would have been more efficient and emitted less local air pollution than all other large (over 400 MW) local lignite-fuelled power stations in Turkey, as they use subcritical boilers. According to the Turkey Wealth Fund, the plant would have been environmentally friendly, using the latest emission control technologies. Cooling water would have been supplied from Hurman Creek via the Karakuz Dam, (which was completed in 2024). According to Climate Action Network Europe, the plant would have increased the risk of drought in the area.

=== Afşin-Elbistan D and E ===
The coalfield also has D and E sectors but, although D and E power stations were planned in the early 21st century, they are not in use.

== Coal ==
Elbistan coalfield, also known as Afşin Elbistan Lignite Reserve, is a large lignite coalfield in Kahramanmaraş Province in the south-east of Turkey. Elbistan is the field with the most coal in Turkey. Former Çöllolar coal mine also supplied a local power station, but after that closed, Kışlaköy was the only mine. 200 million tons of CO_{2} were emitted by burning lignite from this field before 2016. The lignite is high in sulfur and moisture, and the energy value of this coal is only 1,000 to 1,500 kcal/kg, or less than 5 MJ/kg, which is a quarter of typical thermal coal. The coalfield supplies the Afşin-Elbistan power stations.

== Mine ==
Kışlaköy Coal Mine or Afşin Elbistan Mine is a lignite mine in Elbistan coalfield. The largest operating lignite mine in Turkey, it is open pit and can produce 7 million tonnes a year, which feeds the Afşin-Elbistan power stations.

The average energy value of coal is 1.031 Kcal/kg, seam depths are 50 – 175 m, moisture content 53%, ash content 20% and sulfur content 1.2%.

Electricity exports to the EU will be subject to the EU Carbon Border Adjustment Mechanism from 2026 unless Turkey implements its own carbon price. Energy thinktank Shura suggests that people whose jobs are at risk of this could be offered retraining or early retirement.

After a slope failure at an overburden dump site in 2024, the Chamber of Engineers said they had warned about it 4 years before. Although there were no injuries this time, one independent expert said that lessons had not been learned from the fatal 2011 landslides at nearby Çöllolar coal mine, and that safety measures still lacked oversight.

== Disease and deaths ==
Article 56 of the constitution says that "Everyone has the right to live in a healthy and balanced environment. It is the duty of the State and citizens to improve the natural environment, to protect the environmental health and to prevent environmental pollution." In 2024, Human Rights Watch alleged that the existing power stations and proposed expansion contravene the constitution and violate the human rights of nearby residents by damaging their health.

According to the Right to Clean Air Platform Turkey the power stations have caused over 17 thousand premature deaths as of 2024. The Health and Environment Alliance estimate almost one hundred thousand cases of bronchitis have been caused, mostly in children. There is an air quality monitoring station in Elbistan, which is 22 km away from the power stations, and its data is public: however data from air quality monitoring 3 km from the power stations is not public.

The Health and Environment Alliance estimate that phasing out coal by 2030, instead of when the A and B power plant licences end in 2038 and 2052 respectively, would prevent over 2000 premature deaths. There is a pollutant release and transfer register, but as of 2025, no years are publicly searchable because it is not yet technically complete, and it is not known what pollution sources will be granted exemptions. (Note: As of 2025 it seems the website is only accessible from within Turkey) According to Greenpeace, many people in nearby villages, such as Çoğalhan and Altınelma, complain of asthma. Çoğulhan has 3 times the SO_{2} level of Elbistan. Climate Trace has estimated 2023 local air pollution from the A plant at: 120t PM_{2.5}, 9.35Kt NO_{x}, and 10.52Kt SO_{2}.

== Economics ==
According to Çelikler, the A plant and mine employed 1450 people, mostly local, in 2024.

The C plant was planned to operate for 35 years and was proposed to be partially funded by the Turkey Wealth Fund (TWF), the country's sovereign wealth fund, a major partner. This is in accordance with the energy policy of Turkey, which prioritises local sources of energy to reduce coal and natural gas imports, partly in order to maintain energy security. Verus Partners advised on finance, but despite low production costs, the private sector was not interested, as the coal is low-quality. The TWF claimed the plant would have an economic life of 35 years, create "serious employment", and Vice President Fuat Oktay said in 2020 that it would reduce the current account deficit. According to Greenpeace, local farmers say ash has reduced their crop yields. In 2024, Greenpeace argued that the proposed 36b lira investment in new coal power would be better spent on solar power and energy storage.

== Pollution ==
After a long-running legal case, some data from the continuous emissions monitoring system requested by Greenpeace was released.

=== Greenhouse gas emissions ===
The Afşin-Elbistan C EIA estimated CO_{2} emissions would be more than 60 million tonnes of CO_{2} per year: and was accepted by the government. For comparison, total annual greenhouse gas emissions by Turkey are less than 575 million tonnes; thus about a tenth of greenhouse gas emissions by Turkey would have been from the planned power station. (Note: 62 megatonnes would be emitted annually if run at the targeted capacity factor, whereas Turkey's total annual emissions are less than 575 megatonnes. By simple arithmetic 62 megatonnes is about 10% of 575+62 megatonnes.) (Note: This power station aimed to generate just over 12.5 TWh (gross) per year. The calculation in the EIA assumes an emission factor of 94.6 tCO2/TJ, which is three times the average of about 30 for Turkish lignite, but it is unclear whether this is the only reason the CO2 emissions per kWh were predicted to be very high. Since 2020, more stringent filtering of local air pollutants from the smokestack has been compulsory. Moreover, although the average is about 2800, the net calorific value of Turkish lignite varies between 1000 and 6000 kcal/kg.) Space-based measurements of carbon dioxide means the public will know the level of emissions almost in real time.

== Opposition ==
Environmentalists claimed the country already had too much electricity generating capacity. Environmental and public health groups criticised the proposed C plant EIA for describing coal as clean energy and, in February 2020, thousands of people filed petitions against its approval. It was approved by the Ministry of Environment and Urbanisation in March 2020. In 2021, an expert report commissioned by the Maraş Regional Administrative Court said that the EIA positive decision given to Afşin-Elbistan C was faulty as it failed to accurately assess the project's environmental pollution and impact on agricultural activities, water basins and human health. Environmental group TEMA Foundation said, as Turkey had recently ratified the Paris Agreement to limit climate change, the plans to build the C plant should be immediately abandoned. In 2021, the C plant was cancelled.

In 2024, the mayors of Elbistan and nearby Nurhak opposed the proposed expansion of the A plant. Lawsuits were filed in 2025 against the EIA approval of the expansion, and HRW has filed an amicus brief.

== Public opinion ==
According to a 2020 survey from nearby Kahramanmaraş Sütçüimam University, most locals say they have chronic illness, and almost all believe that environmental protection measures taken by power plant managers are insufficient. Opponents of the plants say that: "a significant portion of the people living in Afşin Elbistan are struggling with cancer or respiratory tract diseases."

== See also ==
- Coal power in Turkey
