= Elbistan coalfield =

Afşin Elbistan Lignite Reserve

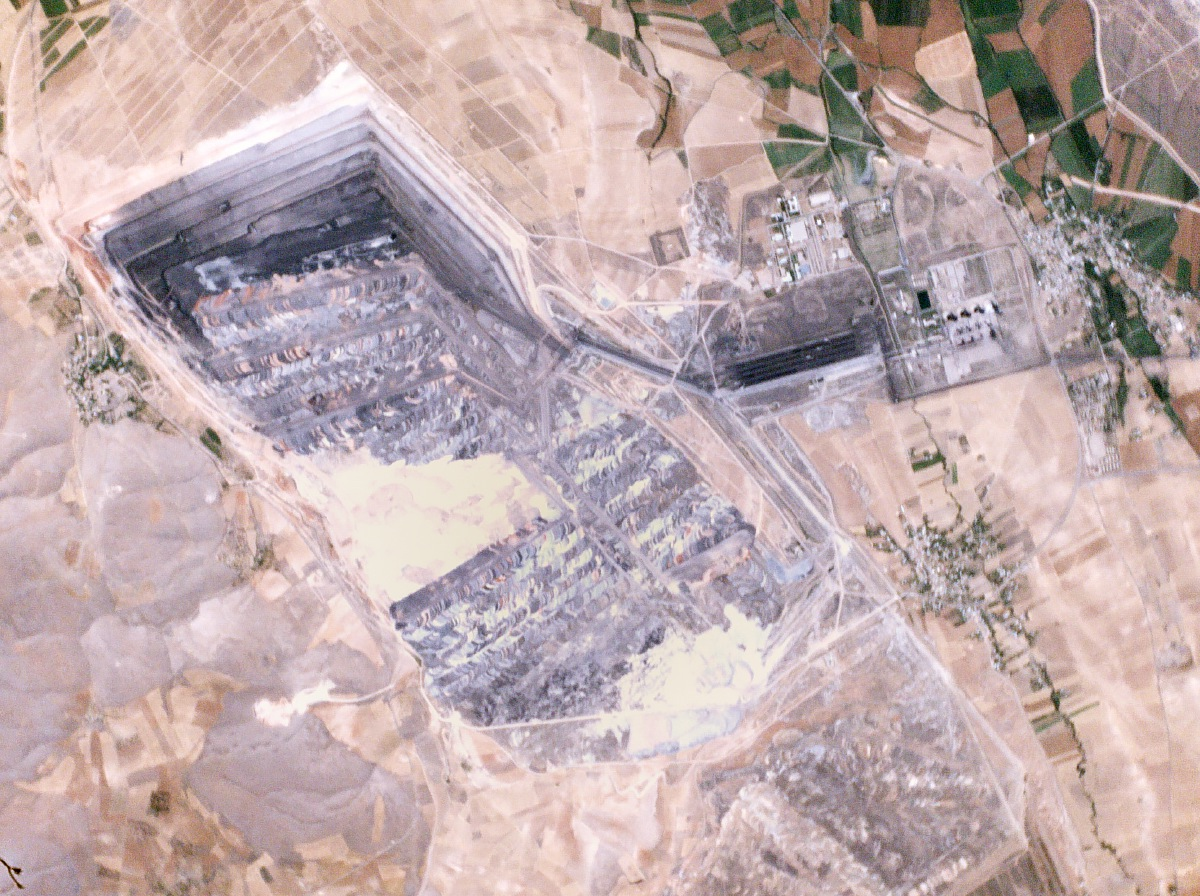
- Afsin-Elbistan Power Complex
- Location: Kahramanmaraş Province, Turkey
- Products: lignite

Elbistan coalfield, also known as Afşin Elbistan Lignite Reserve, is a large lignite coalfield in Kahramanmaraş Province in the south-east of Turkey. Elbistan is the field with the most coal in Turkey. Former Çöllolar coal mine also supplied a local power station, but after that closed, Kışlaköy was the only mine. 200 million tons of CO_{2} were emitted by burning lignite from this field before 2016. The lignite is high in sulfur and moisture, and the energy value of this coal is only 1,000 to 1,500 kcal/kg, or less than 5 MJ/kg, which is a quarter of typical thermal coal. The coalfield supplies the Afşin-Elbistan power stations.

== Sources ==
- EÜAŞ - A briefing for investors, insurers and banks (PDF). Europe Beyond Coal (Report). January 2020.
