= Kışlaköy coal mine =

Mine in Turkey

Kışlaköy Coal Mine
- Interactive map of Kışlaköy Coal Mine
- Location: Kahramanmaraş Province, Turkey; 38.340685°N 37.082979°E
- Products: Lignite

Kışlaköy Coal Mine or Afşin Elbistan Mine is a lignite mine in Elbistan coalfield. The largest operating lignite mine in Turkey, it is open pit and can produce 7 million tonnes a year, which feeds the Afşin-Elbistan power stations.

The average energy value of coal is 1.031 Kcal/kg, seam depths are 50 – 175 m, moisture content 53%, ash content 20% and sulfur content 1.2%.

Electricity exports to the EU will be subject to the EU Carbon Border Adjustment Mechanism from 2026 unless Turkey implements its own carbon price. Energy thinktank Shura suggests that people whose jobs are at risk of this could be offered retraining or early retirement.

After a slope failure at an overburden dump site in 2024, the Chamber of Engineers said they had warned about it 4 years before. Although there were no injuries this time, one independent expert said that lessons had not been learned from the fatal 2011 landslides at nearby Çöllolar coal mine, and that safety measures still lacked oversight.
