= Air pollution in Turkey =

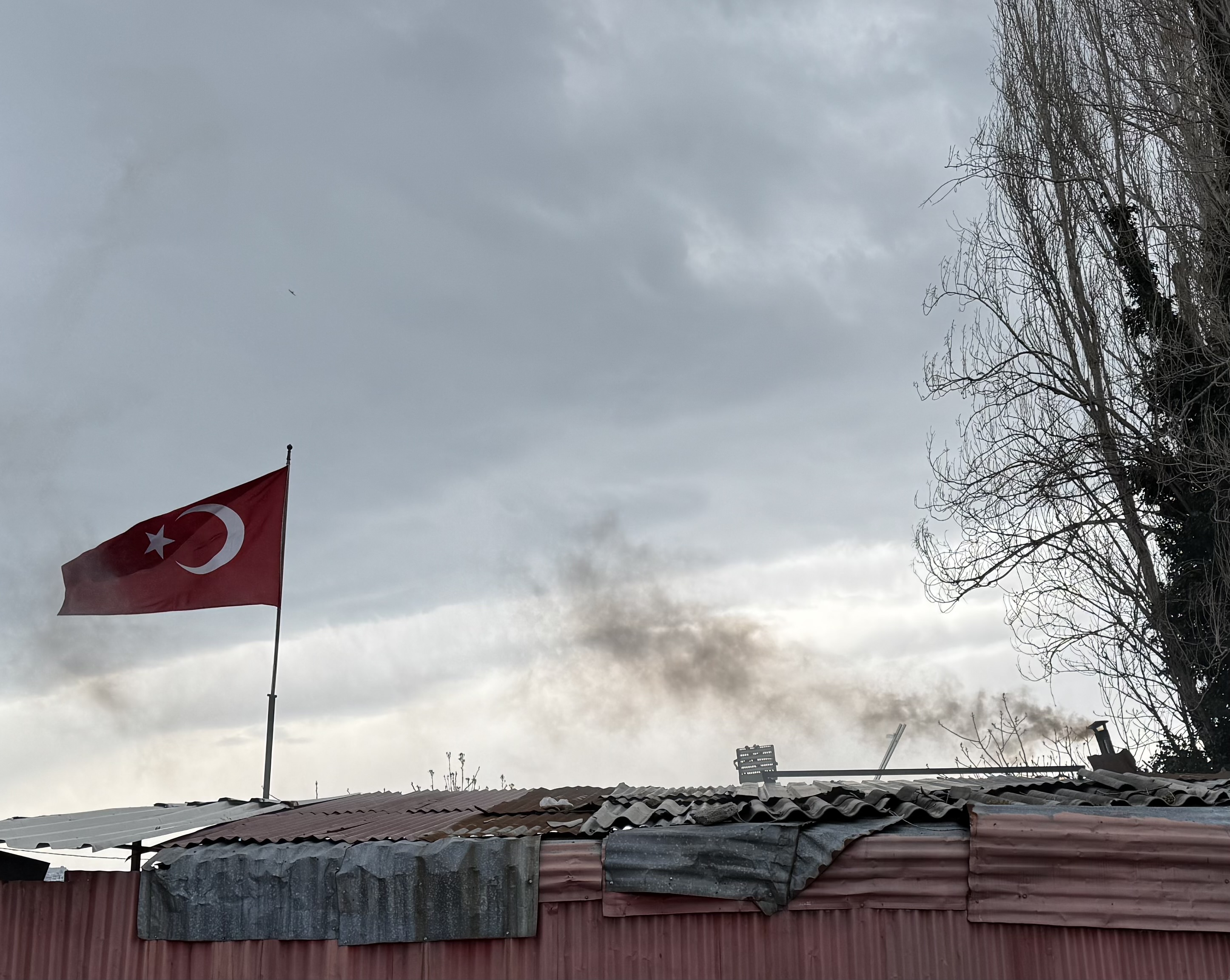
Samsun city in 2025

In Turkey, air pollution kills more people than any other environmental issue. Data from the World Health Organization (WHO) says 99% of the global population breathes unsafe air. No province in Turkey meets the WHO guidelines for clean air. In 2024, more than 60,000 people in that country are estimated to have died from air-pollution-related illnesses. Air pollution is particularly damaging to children's health.

Road transport and sometimes coal burning pollute towns and cities. There is no legal limit on fine particulates that cause lung and other diseases. Cars and lorries spread diesel exhaust, dust, nitrogen oxides (NOx) and other fumes. There are no clean-air zones and tariffs on electric cars are higher than on cars with combustion engines. Although electric-vehicle manufacturing and sales are increasing, policy is poorly co-ordinated, and as of 2023, health impact assessment is not done in Turkey.

Soot from the burning of wood for cooking and heating pollutes households and some cities. Low-quality lignite coal, which is burnt in cities and in the oldest of the country's coal-fired power stations, is also a big part of the problem. Some plant-specific pollution data is collected by the Environment Ministry but is not usually published. As of 2025, air quality in Turkey is below that of standards set by the European Union (EU). The civil-society organization Right to Clean Air Platform Turkey estimates the lack of a legal limit on fine particulates cost Turkey's economy 10% of gross domestic product (GDP) in 2024.

== Illness and death ==
Air pollution has been shown to cause cancer, and to contribute to respiratory, cardiovascular and cerebrovascular diseases. Asthma is expensive to treat and can be caused by exposure to nitrogen oxides. A study of air pollution and asthma in Niğde between 2006 to 2010 showed reporting of asthma cases was closely related to ambient sulfur dioxide (SO_{2}) concentrations. Daily variations in air pollutants were studied in Istanbul from 2013 to 2015 in relation to respiratory hospital admissions. The air pollutants PM_{2.5}, nitrogen dioxide (NO_{2}), and PM_{10} were shown to increase the risk of hospital admissions for respiratory diseases. Another study examined air pollutants and pediatric emergency-room visits to a tertiary hospital in Istanbul between January 2016 and December 2023. They reported increases in nitric oxide (NO), NOx, PM_{2.5}, NO_{2}, and PM_{10} were associated with more asthma-related pediatric visits to the emergency room.

Right to Clean Air Platform Turkey estimates one in seven deaths (68,000) in 2022 were due to air pollution. Other estimates of annual excess mortality range from 37,000 due to PM_{2.5} to 60,000 from fossil-fuel use. In many places, the health effects of air pollution cannot be estimated because there is not enough monitoring of PM_{10} and PM_{2.5} particulates; average early mortality, compared to if World Health Organization (WHO) air-pollution guidelines were followed, is estimated to be 0.4 years per person. This will vary by location because air pollution is more severe in some cities.

== Sources of air pollution ==
Air pollution in Turkey is a health risk mainly due to the burning of fossil fuels, such as coal and diesel.

=== Traffic ===
As of 2024, Turkey's National Energy Balance statistics do not split road-transport fuel into petrol and diesel. As of 2025, fewer than 5% of the country's cars were electric or hybrid, with diesel, petrol and liquefied petroleum gas (LPG) each over 30%. Increasing the proportion of electric cars in use in Turkey to 10% by 2030 would also reduce the country's greenhouse-gas emissions. There are high purchase taxes on new cars. There are no clean air zones and tariffs on electric cars are higher than on combustion cars. Continued electrification of the rail network and high-speed line expansion are underway. The Right to Clean Air Platform argues that there should be a legal limit on fine airborne dust, much of which comes from car and lorry exhaust.

=== Home heating and cooking ===
In 2022, most fine-particulate (PM_{2.5}) pollution in Turkey came from residential combustion for cooking and heating. Despite economic growth, the country's poorest families still use solid-biomass fuels such as wood, which pollutes some cities. Low-quality Turkish coal is also burnt. The use of these fuels increases indoor air pollution and is a health hazard; low-tier fuels are more harmful to human health. Higher-income families may use modern fuels such as natural gas or electricity, which cause less pollution and can lead to better health outcomes. Electricity supply, however, is often insufficient to meet a family's heating needs. If electricity is supplemented with low-quality biofuels, indoor air-pollution levels will increase and negatively affect health outcomes.

Women, children, and the elderly, who may spend more time indoors and deal with cooking, are most likely to suffer ill health due to indoor air pollution. Income, education and home ownership are associated with use of higher-grade fuels for heating and cooking, and with better health.

=== Passive smoking ===
More than a quarter of adults in Turkey smoke tobacco; passive smoking is a danger and increases the risk of respiratory infection.

=== Industry and construction ===
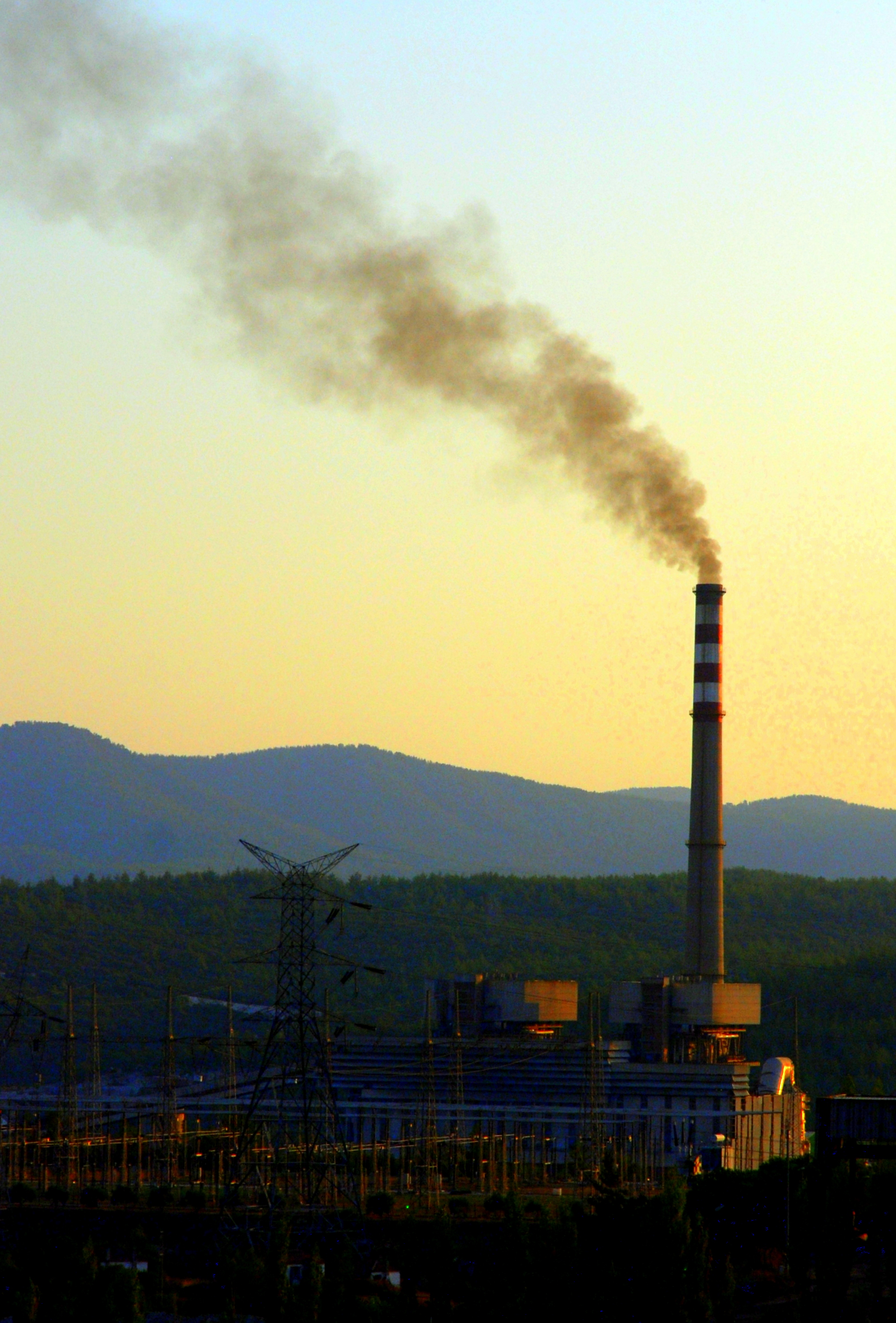
Yeniköy Power Plant in Muğla

Under Turkish legislation, new industrial facilities must achieve at least a Class D Industrial Green Transformation Certificate (70% compliance with Best Available Techniques), whereas existing facilities will be required to obtain a minimum Class F (50%) before 2029 and a minimum Class D certification before 2030. This is below the recommended levels of the EU Industrial and Livestock Rearing Emissions Directive (IED 2.0).

Air pollution is one of the environmental impacts of concrete. Although asbestos was completely banned in 2010, it can still be a risk when older buildings are demolished, and in dumps. In some rural areas of Turkey, deposits of regulated asbestos minerals and non-regulated fibrous minerals such as erionite naturally occur, increasing the risk of mesothelioma.

The Health and Environment Alliance (HEAL) says pollution from coal-fired power stations causes significant illness and early deaths. As of 2025, legal action continues, as do allegations of inadequate filtering. Power plants less than 50 MW do not have to register for an SYD certificate.

According to Greenpeace Mediterranean, the coal-fired power plants in Afşin-Elbistan are the highest health risk in a European country, followed by Soma power station.

=== Other ===
Wildfires and dust blown from the Sahara (PM_{10}) sometimes pollute.

== Types and levels ==
Levels of all types of pollutants across the country exceed World Health Organization guidelines. Wood burning is a major source of indoor air pollution and contributes to outdoor air pollution. Particulates from transport fuel use and tyre wear of vehicles are a danger to people's lungs. Regulations in Turkey do not restrict particles less than 2.5 microns in diameter (PM_{2.5}) , which cause lung diseases. There is no limit on PM_{2.5} and limits for other pollutants (except SO_{2}) are above WHO guidelines:

Pollutant (μg/m^{3})	Averaging time	World Health Organization guideline	Turkey limit
PM_{2.5}	Annual	5	
PM_{2.5}	24 hour	15	no limit
PM_{10}	Annual	15	40
PM_{10}	24 hour	45	50
O_{3}	Peak Season	60	
O_{3}	8 hour	100	120
NO_{2}	Annual	10	40
NO_{2}	24 hour	25	
NO_{2}	Hourly		250
SO_{2}	24 hour	40	20
SO_{2}	Hourly		350
CO	24 hour	4000	
CO	8 hour		10000

Although there is some monitoring of air pollution, many air pollution indicators are not available. The country's air quality index omits particles smaller than 2.5 microns (PM_{2.5}) but includes nitrogen dioxide, sulfur dioxide, carbon monoxide, tropospheric ozone, and particles between 10 and 2.5 microns in diameter (PM_{10}).

There are hourly, daily and yearly average limits for pollutants around coal-fired power stations in a radius 50 times the chimney height:

Pollutant		Duration	Unit	Limit
SO_{2}		Hourly (not to be exceeded more than 24 times in a year)	μg/m^{3}	350
SO_{2}		24 hours	μg/m^{3}	125
SO_{2}		Long-term limit	μg/m^{3}	60
SO_{2}		Yearly and winter (1 Oct - 31 Mar)	μg/m^{3}	20
NO_{2}		Hourly (not to be exceeded more than 18 times in a year)	μg/m^{3}	250 (200 from 2024)
NO_{2}		Yearly	μg/m^{3}	40
PM10		Hourly (not to be exceeded more than 35 times in a year)	μg/m^{3}	50
PM10		Yearly	μg/m^{3}	40
Pb		Yearly	μg/m^{3}	0.5
CO		Maximum daily 8-hour average	mg/m^{3}	10
Cd		Long-term limit	μg/m^{3}	0.02
HCI		Short-term limit	μg/m^{3}	150
HCI		Long-term limit	μg/m^{3}	60
HF		Hourly	μg/m^{3}	30
HF		Short-term limit	μg/m^{3}	5
H_{2}S		Hourly	μg/m^{3}	100
H_{2}S		Short-term limit	μg/m^{3}	20
Total organic compounds		Hourly	μg/m^{3}	280
Total organic compounds		Short-term limit	μg/m^{3}	70
Settling dust		Short-term limit	mg/m^{2}/day	390
Settling dust		Long-term limit	mg/m^{2}/day	210
In settling dust	Pb and compounds	Long-term limit	mg/m^{2}/day	250
In settling dust	Cd and compounds	Long-term limit	mg/m^{2}/day	3.75
In settling dust	Tl and compounds	Long-term limit	mg/m^{2}/day	5

=== Other ===
NO_{2} in cities such as Ankara is visible from satellites. Diesel exhaust from vehicles contains NOx and other air pollutants. Emissions of sulfur dioxide from coal-fired power stations are significant. Volatile organic compounds (VOCs) come from some industries. Emission levels of persistent organic pollutants are regulated but emission totals for these chemicals were not reported in 2019. Ankara suffers from ground-level ozone pollution. There is ammonia pollution from agriculture.

Turkey emits about one percent of the world's greenhouse gas emissions. Because most of the country's air pollution is caused by the burning of fossil fuels, Turkey's air pollution would be reduced by low emission zones for city traffic, and the replacement of free distribution of coal for poor families with a different support. Climate-change mitigation would be a co-benefit of the main health benefits, and health improvement would be a co-benefit of climate-change mitigation. For example, the closure of Afşin A power plant to reduce carbon dioxide emissions would also reduce local air pollution and benefit the health of local residents.

== Monitoring and reporting ==
In 2023, Right to Clean Air Platform Turkey said half of the 360 Ministry of Environment and Urbanization monitoring stations were not working properly. Turkey has no pollutant release and transfer register law so there is no obligation for industry to publish pollution levels. Turkey has not ratified the Gothenburg Protocol on air pollution.

Some industrial companies reach Global Reporting Initiative (GRI) 305 emissions standard. There is a pollutant release and transfer register, but as of September 2024 no years are publicly searchable because it is not yet technically complete, and it is unknown what exemptions will be granted or when the register will be completed. As of 2026 the http://www.kstk.gov.tr/ link which is supposed to be the register is not working. Turkey has eight regional clean-air centres.

== Cities ==
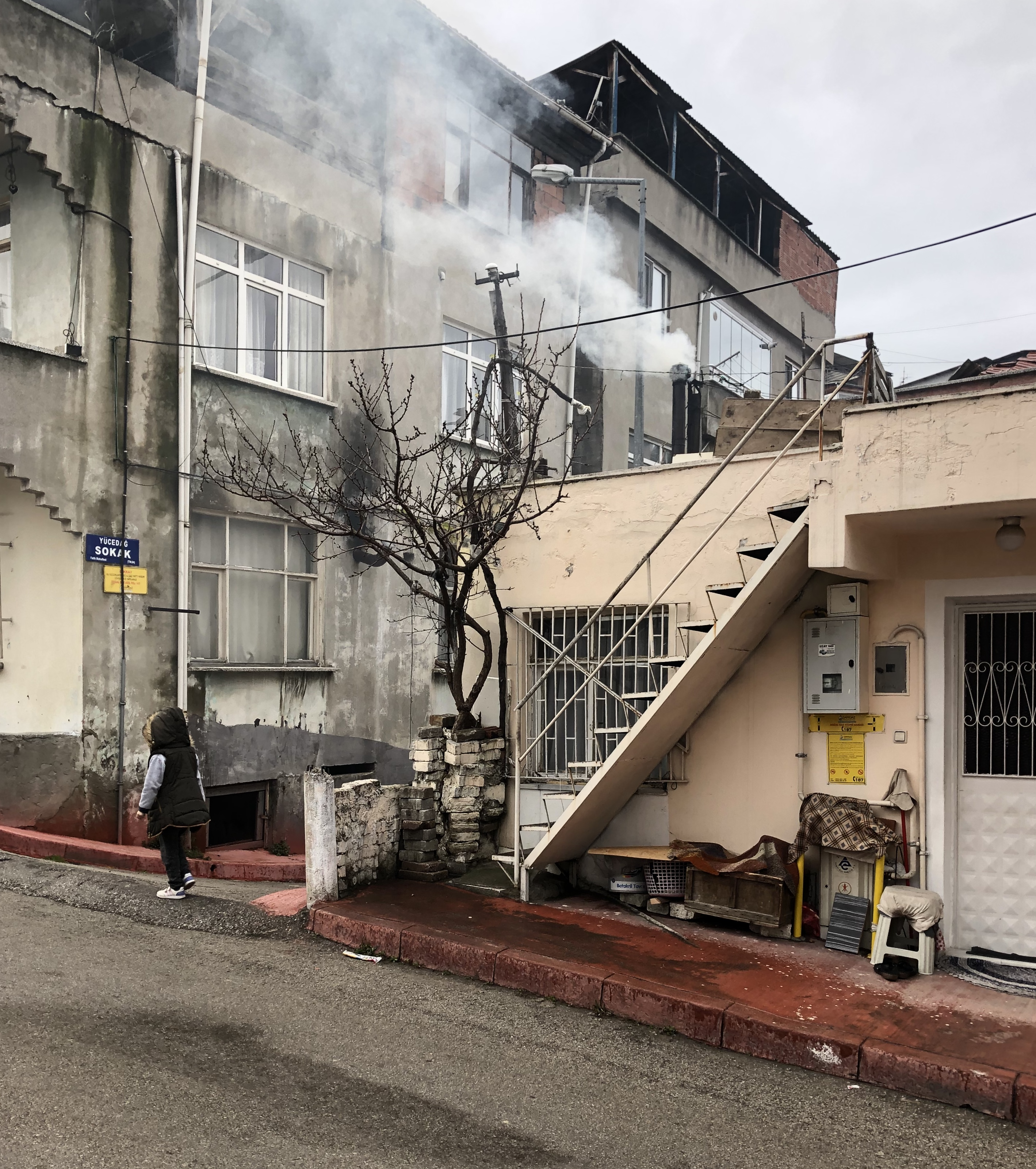
Coal and wood are still burnt to heat some older buildings in Turkey. This is a big city and the yellow plaque shows natural gas is available in the street.

Many cities in Turkey are more polluted than typical European cities. Some nearby cities are taking steps to counter pollution; Sofia, Bulgaria, is introducing a low-emission zone, and restricting the burning of coal and wood.

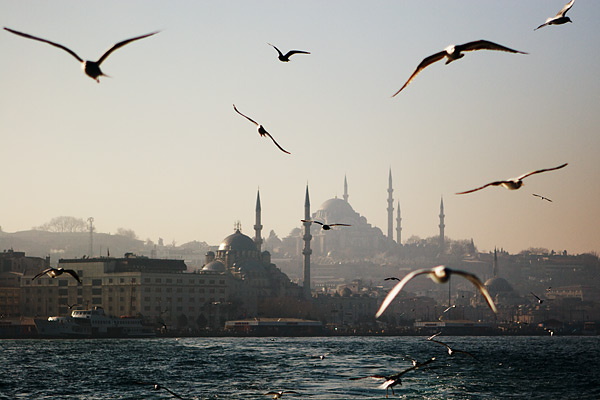
Smog in Istanbul in the early 21st century

Pollution in Istanbul has lessened since the 1990s but traffic is still unhealthy. Street dust is potentially toxic. NO_{2} is visible in measurements by Orbiting Carbon Observatory 3. Pollution worsens when high-pressure areas trap pollutants near the ground and prevent them from dispersing. Most particles are ultrafine; researchers say ultrafine and black carbon should be continuously monitored.

As of 2022, industry in Bursa is a particular problem. NO_{2} is visible in satellite measurements. A higher-than-average rate of multiple sclerosis (MS) may be related to local industry in Ereğli.

== Politics ==
The Climate Change and Air Management Coordination Board is responsible for coordination between government departments. As of 2019, however, according to the EU, better-coordinated policies need to be established and implemented.

Turkey has not ratified the Gothenburg Protocol, although it has ratified the original Convention on Long-Range Transboundary Air Pollution, and those reports are public. Pollution from Turkey affects neighbouring countries. The Armenian Nuclear Power Plant, 16 kilometres (9.9 miles) over the border, is old and said to be insufficiently earthquake proof.

== Economics ==
In 2025 the Organisation for Economic Co-operation and Development (OECD) said poor air quality is a structural weakness in the economy. The impact of air pollution on the economy via damage to health may be billions of euros. A study of 2015-16 hospital admissions in Erzincan estimated direct costs of air pollution as 2.5% of total health-related expenditures for the 15–34 and over-65 age groups, but stated the total cost is likely much higher; for example, the economic costs of reductions in the intelligence of adults and children have not been estimated. According to medical group Health and Environment Alliance (HEAL), reducing PM_{2.5} air pollution in Turkey would substantially increase GDP.

According to the OECD, in 2019, the exemption of bitumen (asphalt) from special consumption tax was a subsidy of 5.9 billion lira. In hot weather, bitumen, which is used for road surfaces, releases secondary organic aerosols, which can damage health.

== Proposed solutions ==
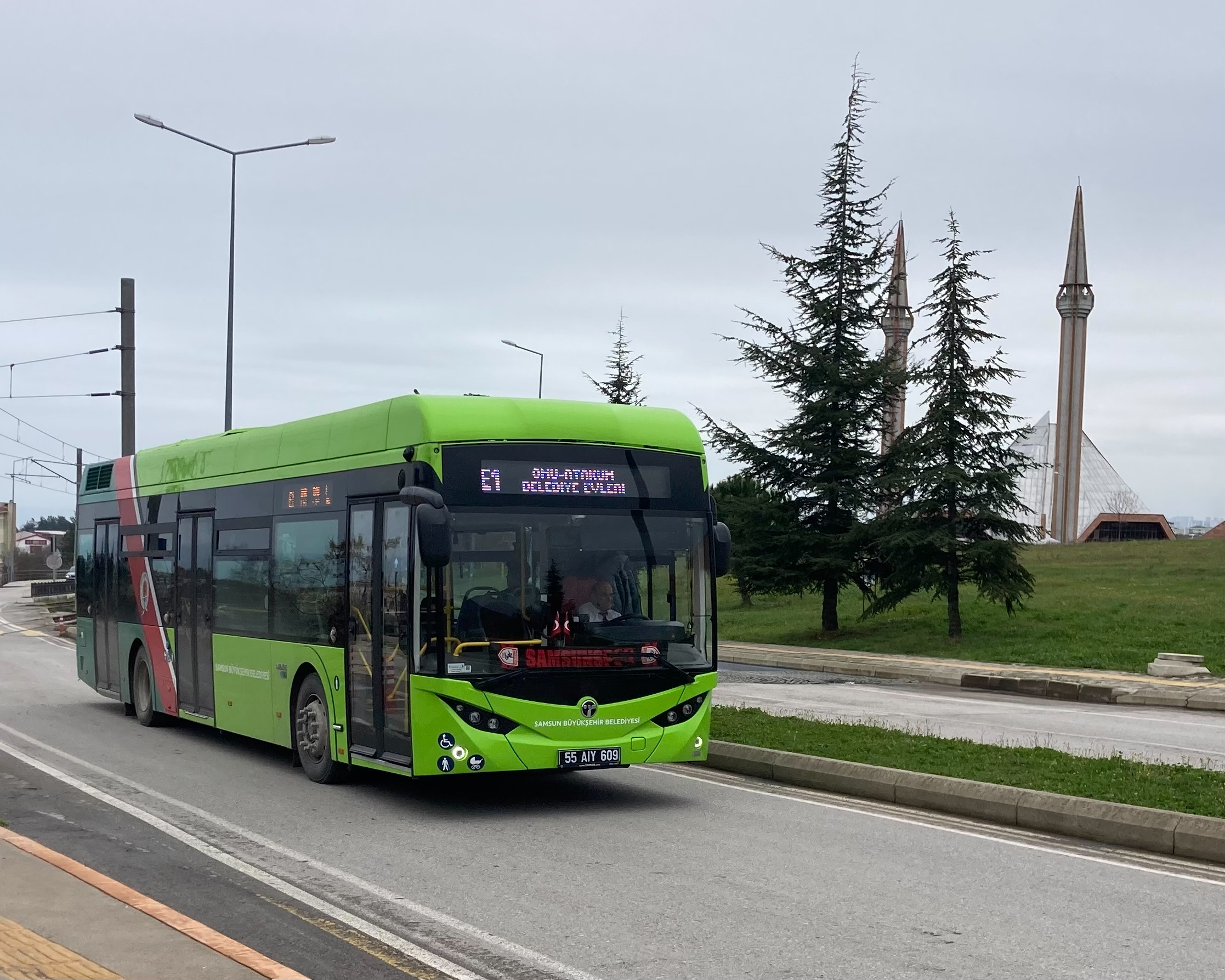
Electric buses were introduced in the early 2020s but are not widespread

In the Constitution of Turkey, Article 56 says: "Everyone has the right to live in a healthy and balanced environment. It is the duty of the State and citizens to improve the natural environment, to protect the environmental health and to prevent environmental pollution."

The phasing out of coal is said to be essential. The strengthening of environmental laws would benefit Turkey's economy. According to HEAL, over 500 premature deaths per year could be avoided by closing three power stations in Muğla.

Electric ferryboats have been proposed for the Bosphoros. A low-emission zone for road traffic has been suggested for Istanbul, and it has been suggested Turkey's vehicle tax system should be changed to better charge for pollution. More green space is suggested for cities. The taxing of pollution by internal flights and a further improvement of the country's railways have also been suggested.

== History ==
The burning of wood indoors in Turkey has caused pollution since at least the Neolithic. Lead was first smelted around 5,000 BC in Anatolia. In 535 AD, Justinian I acknowledged the importance of clean air. In the 19th century, air pollution was thought of in terms of miasma, the idea foul smells could cause disease.

Due to the high cost of oil after the 1970s oil crisis, cities increased the burning of lignite for residential heating. An Air Pollution Control Regulation was issued in the 1980s and the monitoring of air quality began in that decade. In early 2020, air pollution in most major cities in Turkey significantly decreased due to COVID-19 restrictions, but tropospheric ozone, a leading cause of smog, increased because fewer particles were available to block sunlight. Air pollution started to rise again by the middle of the year.

== Sources ==
- "Turkey 2019 Report" (PDF). European Commission (EC). May 2019.
- The European environment — state and outlook 2020 (Report). European Environment Agency (EEA). 2019.
- Jensen, Genon K. (December 2018). Lignite coal – health effects and recommendations from the health sector (PDF) (Report). Health and Environment Alliance (HEAL). Archived from the original (PDF) on 2018-12-11.
- Air Pollution Report 2018 (Report). Chamber of Environmental Engineers.
- Hava Kirliliği Raporu 2019 [Air Pollution Report 2019] (PDF) (Report) (in Turkish). Chamber of Environmental Engineers. Archived from the original (PDF) on 2020-05-21.
- Türki̇ye'ni̇n Enerji̇ Görünümü 2020 [Turkey's energy overview 2020] (PDF) (in Turkish). TMMOB Maki̇na Mühendi̇sleri̇ Odasi. May 2020. ISBN 978-605-01-1367-9. Archived from the original (PDF) on 2020-09-21.
- Aytaç, Orhan (May 2020). Ülkemi̇zdeki̇ Kömür Yakitli Santrallar Çevre Mevzuatiyla uyumlu mu? [Are Turkey's coal-fired power stations in accordance with environmental laws?] (PDF) (Report) (in Turkish). TMMOB Maki̇na Mühendi̇sleri̇ Odasi. Archived from the original (PDF) on 2020-09-21.
- IEA (March 2021). Turkey 2021 – Energy Policy Review (Technical report). International Energy Agency.
