= Acid Rain Program =

Initiative taken by the United States Environmental Protection Agency

The Acid Rain Program is a market-based initiative taken by the United States Environmental Protection Agency in an effort to reduce overall atmospheric levels of sulfur dioxide and nitrogen oxides, which cause acid rain. The program is an implementation of emissions trading that primarily targets coal-burning power plants, allowing them to buy and sell emission permits (called "allowances") according to individual needs and costs. In 2011, the trading program that existed since 1995 was supplemented by four separate trading programs under the Cross-State Air Pollution Rule (CSAPR). On August 21, 2012, the United States Court of Appeals for the District of Columbia issued its Opinion and Order in the appeal of the Cross State Air Pollution Rule (CSAPR) for two independent legal reasons. The stay on CSAPR was lifted in October 2014, allowing implementation of the law and its trading programs to begin.

A 2021 study found that the "Acid Rain Program caused lasting improvements in ambient air quality," reducing mortality risk by 5% over 10 years.

== History ==
Title IV of the Clean Air Act Amendments of 1990 established the allowance market system known today as the Acid Rain Program. Initially targeting only sulfur dioxide, Title IV set a decreasing cap on total SO_{2} emissions for each of the following several years, aiming to reduce overall emissions to 50% of 1980 levels. The program did not begin immediately, but was implemented in two stages: Phase I (starting January 1, 1995) and Phase II (starting January 1, 2000).

The Clean Air Act Amendments of 1990 set as its primary goal the reduction of annual SO_{2} emissions by 10 million tons below 1980 levels of about 18.9 million tons. To achieve these reductions by 2000, when a nationwide sulfur dioxide emissions cap of 8.95 million tons per year began, the law required a two phase tightening of operating restrictions placed on fossil fuel fired (e.g., coal, oil, natural gas) power plants. The operation and pricing of a market for emissions allowances would not be viable in the absence of an effective regulatory cap on the total number of allowances available.

=== Scope of Phase I requirements ===
In Phase I, half the total reductions were required by January 1, 1995, largely by requiring 110 electric power generating plants (261 units in 21 states) to cut sulfur dioxide emission rates to 2.5 pounds per million British thermal units (3.9 kg/MWh). Each of these generating units was identified by name and location, and a quantity of emissions allowances was specified in the statute in tons of allowable SO_{2} emissions per year.

For comparison, new generating units built since 1978 were required to limit sulfur dioxide to a "lowest achievable emissions rate" of about 0.6 pounds per million British thermal units (0.93 kg/MWh). Coal with 1.25% sulfur and 10,000 British thermal units per pound (6.5 kWh/kg) produces sulfur dioxide emissions of 2.5 pounds per million British thermal units (3.9 kg/MWh), with lower emissions produced by either lower sulfur content or higher Btu content.

As an incentive for reducing emissions, for each ton of sulfur dioxide reduced below the applicable emissions limit, owners of a generating unit received an emissions allowance they could use at another unit, keep for future use, or sell. This legitimized a market for sulfur dioxide emissions allowances, administered by the Chicago Board of Trade. Units that installed flue-gas desulfurization equipment (e.g., scrubbers) or other "qualifying Phase I technology" which reduced sulfur dioxide emissions by 90%, qualified for a two-year extension of the 1995 deadline, provided they owned allowances to cover their total actual emissions for each year of the extension period.

=== Scope of Phase II requirements ===
In Phase II, all fossil-fired units over 75 MWe were required to limit emissions of sulfur dioxide to 1.2 pounds per million British thermal units (1.9 kg/MWh) by January 1, 2000. Thereafter, they were required to obtain an emissions allowance for each ton of sulfur dioxide emitted, subject to a mandatory fine of $2,000.00 for each ton emitted in excess of allowances held. The U.S. Environmental Protection Agency (EPA) distributes allowances equivalent to 8.95 million tons each year (the emissions cap), based on calculations of historical Btu usage for each unit, and may allocate various small "bonus reserves" of allowances.

=== Nitrogen oxide reduction ===
The 1990 Amendments also required reductions in nitrogen oxide (NO_{x}) emissions at Phase I units. The key factors in NO_{x} formation are flame temperature and oxygen levels present for combustion. Installation of low-NO_{x} burner retrofits are the most common means of compliance, generally reducing emissions from uncontrolled levels by up to 50%. Many utilities complied with requirements by installing stack-gas scrubbers and low-NO_{x} burners at the same time. Low-NO_{x} burner technology was readily available, and considerably less expensive than installation of scrubbers, so control of NO_{x} was considered less demanding by most electric utilities.

== Compliance strategies ==
The market based SO_{2} allowance trading component of the Acid Rain Program was intended to allow utilities to adopt the most cost effective strategy to reduce SO_{2} emissions. Every Acid Rain Program operating permit outlines specific requirements and compliance options chosen by each source. Affected utilities also were required to install systems that continuously monitor emissions of SO_{2}, NO_{x}, and other related pollutants in order to track progress, ensure compliance, and provide credibility to the trading component of the program. Monitoring data is transmitted to EPA daily via telecommunications systems.

Strategies for compliance with air quality controls have been major components of electric utility planning and operations since the mid-1970s, affecting choice of fuels, technologies and locations for construction of new generating capacity. Utility strategies for compliance with new sulfur dioxide standards included a mix of options with varying financial costs:

- several existing and new stack-gas scrubbing and clean coal technologies;
- switching to all, or blending high-sulfur coal with, low-sulfur coal;
- switching to all natural gas, or cofiring coal and natural gas;
- "trimming," or reducing annual hours of plant utilization;
- retiring old units;
- repowering existing units with new coal or non-coal boilers;
- purchasing or transferring emissions allowances from other units;
- increasing demand-side management and conservation; or
- bulk power purchases from other utilities or non-utility generators from units using coal or other fuels.

Some coal cleaning may occur in combination with other actions such as scrubbing, or blending coals with varying sulfur content, but utilities generally prefer that coal suppliers bear the costs of cleaning operations. Some observers estimated 20% - 30% of the sulfur can be removed through coal cleaning or blending, and 50%–70% taken out with emissions control equipment.

For Phase II compliance the options were numerous, but for Phase I they were constrained by the time available to implement a decision. Because it takes 3–5 years to design and build a scrubber at an existing coal-fired unit, and longer to repower or build a new facility (e.g., 6–11 years for coal, 10–14 years for nuclear units), electric utility decision options for Phase I plants were limited to scrubbing, switching fuels, purchasing or transferring emissions allowances to allow continued use of high-sulfur coal, retiring units, or trimming unit utilization and substituting capacity from another source.

Delays in allocating "early scrub" bonus credits and scheduling of the first auction of emissions allowances in March 1993 effectively removed these incentives from actual compliance decision making of most electric utilities. Because of the time it takes to build air pollution control equipment, financial and contractual commitments to scrubbers had to be made by summer 1992 if plant modifications were to be operational in time to meet new standards in 1995. Thus, decisions had to be made before price and allocation of emissions allowances were known. Consequently, most scrubber projects to meet the 1995 deadline were well under way by fall of 1992.

=== Windfalls ===
Of the 261 units at 110 plant locations affected by Phase I emission limitations, five were oil-fired, five coal-fired units were retired, and one coal-fired unit was placed on cold standby status prior to passage of the legislation in 1990. The 6 inactive coal-fired units were statutory recipients of a total of 36,020 tons of Phase I sulfur dioxide emissions allowances.

This marketable windfall was estimated by the U.S. Department of Energy (DOE) in 1991 to be worth $665 to $736 per ton, totaling $23.9 to $26.5 million. However, actual purchases of emissions allowances in 1992 were reported at a lower price than expected of $300 per ton. Allowances auctioned in March 1993 sold for $122 to $450 per ton, reducing the windfall from these allowances to $4.4 to $16.2 million. In the interim, owners of one unit retired in 1985, the 119 MWe Des Moines Energy Center, received $93 million in DOE funding for a Clean Coal Technology project to repower with a coal-fired 70 MWe pressurized fluidized-bed combustion unit, bringing it back into production in 1996.

=== Location of generating units ===
Excluding those 11 units, 250 active coal-fired units at 105 plants in 21 states were subject to Phase I sulfur dioxide emissions reductions in 1995. States having the greatest number of generating units affected by the Phase I requirements were: Ohio (40), Indiana (37), Pennsylvania (21), Georgia (19), Tennessee (19), Kentucky (17), Illinois (17), Missouri (16) and West Virginia (14). Together, Phase I units represented 20% of the 1,250 operable coal-fired generating units in the U.S. in 1990.

These 250 units had a summer peak generating capability of 79,162 MWe in 1990, with a mean of 317 MWe/unit. This capacity represented about 27% of installed summer coal-fired capability, and about 11.5% of total U.S. installed summer generating capability in 1990. About 207 million tons, almost 90% of the coal purchased by Phase I plants in 1990, produced sulfur dioxide emissions exceeding the 1995 emissions rate of 2.5 lbs/mm Btu using no pollution control equipment.

=== Age matters ===
Age of the 250 Phase I coal units ranged from 17 to 46 years when the standards took effect, with a mean of 34 years. In 1995, 111 active Phase I units (23%) were 35 years of age or older, and only 8 (6%) were less than 20 years old. The average age of 35 coal-fired units retired during 1988-1991 was 44.6 years, with a range of 14–74 years. These units ranged in size from 1-107 MWe summer capability. Several had been on standby (e.g., available for use during regularly scheduled outages of other units for maintenance) for many years prior to retirement. About half (often the older units) were designed to "cofire" with natural gas or fuel oil, and could be operated using these fuels instead of coal if desired.

Both the number and average age of coal-fired units retired increased substantially from 1988 to 1991, indicating utilities were removing very old units from available status that they no longer expected to use, thereby avoiding maintenance costs necessary to keep them on standby. For comparison, the 6 Phase I coal units retired before 1990 ranged in age from 21–35 years when taken out of service, with a mean of 31 years.

Age of these units was significant for several reasons. All of the Phase I units were either built or under construction when the Clean Air Act of 1977 was enacted, and all but eight were built or under construction when the 1970 Act was enacted. Consequently, these units were built when labor costs were significantly less than in the 1990s, and they avoided major investments in pollution control equipment. In the 1990s, these units were often among the least expensive of any operated by their respective owners, in terms of cost per megawatt-hour of energy produced. Compared to other plants on a utility company system, these units provided incentives for their owners to maximize operating time, minimize downtime for repairs or retrofit, and minimize further capital investments in them.

Because capital in such plants is typically amortized over 20–30 years, investments in most of them were fully recovered by 1995. Justifying large additional capital investments in plants which may have a remaining useful life of 10 years or less, absent reconstruction of boilers, is often difficult. Further, because large coal-fired generating units tend to reach peak operating and combustion efficiencies during the first three years of operation, declining incrementally thereafter throughout their lifetimes, these old plants were among the dirtiest sources of air pollution in the electric utility industry. They were able to operate for many years without substantially reducing emissions, when other plants were required to install "best available" air pollution control equipment pursuant to the Clean Air Act Amendments of 1977.

=== Uncertainties ===
Substantial uncertainties confronted electric utilities when planning compliance strategies. These included the future price and availability of fuels; the value of emissions allowances and operation of markets for them; the manner in which state public utilities commissions and the Internal Revenue Service would allocate the costs of scrubbing or switching fuels and the value of emissions allowances; accounting guidelines, revisions to interstate bulk power sales contracts, and possible intervention by the Federal Energy Regulatory Commission in interstate transfers of emissions allowances by multi-state holding companies. Changes in the competitiveness of various generating and pollution control technologies; a myriad of new rule making actions required by the Clean Air Act; and the possibility of new legislation limiting emissions of carbon dioxide, imposing a tax on carbon emissions, or on Btu usage were also of great concern. A final rule easing some uncertainty on continuous emissions monitoring, permit requirements, and operation of the emissions allowance system was not issued until January 1993, well after compliance strategies had to be developed and major investment decisions made.

In this context, utility executives were required to make investment decisions committing millions of dollars over extended periods. As summarized by one utility manager: "Major decisions must be made without adequate information or even the ability to obtain adequate information." For example, after a protracted struggle involving the Ohio Public Utilities Commission, the Ohio Office of Consumer's Counsel, industrial customers, the Ohio Sierra Club, and the United Mine Workers at American Electric Power Company's affiliate Meigs high-sulfur coal mines, construction of scrubbers by AEP at its two-unit, 2,600 MWe Gavin plant in Ohio were expected to cost about $835 million, reducing sulfur dioxide emissions there by 95%. In February 1993, AEP was still unsure whether it would be allowed by the Ohio Public Utilities Commission to transfer emissions credits from the Gavin scrub to Phase I units in other states. Thus, substantial financial commitments had to be made on the basis of best judgments by utility planners and construction begun in the absence of definitive information or final regulatory approvals.

=== Innovations in coal supply contracts ===
The risks associated with such uncertainty stimulated innovation in contracts for purchase of coal by electric utilities. In a buyer's market, utilities renegotiated old contracts and signed new ones with a variety of provisions designed to manage risks and increase flexibility for future decisions. For example, Ohio Edison signed "high/low" contracts at the end of 1991 with three coal suppliers. Under these agreements, the utility could elect to shift purchases from high-sulfur to low-sulfur coal produced by the same supplier. The supplier retained the option of continuing to ship high-sulfur coal in lieu of low-sulfur coal if it provided sufficient emissions allowances so this coal could be burned without penalty. In this event, the supplier paid for the allowances, and the utility paid the contract price for lower sulfur coal.

Additional innovative contract terms under consideration would link price premiums and penalties paid for coal with different levels of sulfur content to changes in the market price of sulfur dioxide emissions allowances; trade emissions allowances to coal suppliers as partial payment for low-sulfur coal; or establish larger variances in quantity and prices for different qualities of coal in a single contract. AMAX Energy purchased an undisclosed number of emissions allowances from Long Island Lighting Company, which it said it would offer in packages with its coal and natural gas contracts. Thus, coal suppliers began participating along with electric utilities as buyers and sellers of marketable sulfur dioxide emissions allowances.

== Market prices ==
The U.S. Department of Energy in 1991 estimated the installed retrofit cost per ton of SO_{2} pollution control equipment (scrubbers) on existing units would be in the $665– $736/ton range. However, 2005 was the first year the price of an SO_{2} allowance reached this level. In December 2005, a few trades were registered at slightly over $1,600/ton. At those rates, it was less expensive to install scrubbers and reduce air pollution than to purchase SO_{2} emissions allowances and continue polluting. Subsequently, the market price of SO_{2} allowances decreased to around $88/ton in August 2009.

== Participation by citizen groups ==
Citizens and groups can purchase sulfur dioxide emissions allowances alongside electric utilities and other producers of air pollution in annual auctions conducted by the U.S. Environmental Protection Agency (EPA) and on the Chicago Board of Trade. Each year the U.S. EPA auctions off to the highest bidder about 250,000 pollution allowances that enable their owners to emit one ton of sulfur dioxide.

No national environmental group has ever bid in the annual EPA Auction, but a small number of local groups have participated for many years, apparently on the theory that reducing the supply of allowances may someday drive up the price of acquiring them. For example, one of the oldest of these groups is the "Acid Rain Retirement Fund" (A.R.R.F.), a non-profit, all-volunteer, community educational group. A.R.R.F. has raised money and bid alongside polluters since 1995 for as many allowances as their funds can buy. But instead of using or trading them, A.R.R.F. retires them permanently, taking allowances off the market and keeping sulfur dioxide out of the air.

Along with allowances purchased in prior years, A.R.R.F. in 2013 owns the right to emit 2,826,000 pounds (1,413 tons) of sulfur dioxide per year, plus whatever amount it did not emit under allowances purchased in previous years. Because it did not exercise its right to emit any pollution during 1996–2013, "banking" its emissions allowances for the future, A.R.R.F. holds the legal right to emit a total of 4,644,000 pounds—or 2,322 tons—of sulfur dioxide in 2013. That amount will increase by another 100 tons in 2018, when allowances A.R.R.F. purchased in the 7-year advance auction of 2011 are eligible for use.

Examination of EPA Auction results 1993–2013 indicates groups or individuals like A.R.R.F. who purchased emissions allowances for purposes other than releasing air pollution now own the right to emit 3,188 tons per year. Although most have purchased only one or a few tons, this adds up to considerably more than the 760 tons/year allocated by law to the Miami Fort #5 coal-fired generating unit in Ohio.

Since many purchases were made in earlier years, and unused allowances have accumulated, these groups own the right to emit 23,012 tons of sulfur dioxide in 2013. That's more than the annual allocation of allowances to 168 of the 250 dirtiest generating units in the United States (some are allowed to emit almost 95,000 tons/year).

== Effectiveness ==
Overall, the Program's cap and trade program has been hailed as successful by the EPA, industry, economists and certain environmental groups such as the Environmental Defense Fund, while skeptical environmentalists have argued that reduction in emissions occurred due to broad trends unconnected to the program. The EPA has used what is called the Integrated Planning Model (IPM) to estimate the effect of the Acid Rain Program (ARP). The output from the model says that annual emissions of sulfur dioxide were reduced by 8 million tons (from 17.3 to 9.3), nitrogen oxides by 2.7 million tons (from 7.6 to 5), and mercury by 10 tons (from 52 to 42). However, it is difficult to estimate the emissions which would have occurred without the ARP. For example, the EPA updated its analysis to reflect the effect of low-sulfur coal becoming more economical due to reduced transportation, leading the EPA to reduce its estimate of the impact of ARP by sulfur dioxide emissions by one million tons.

Since the 1990s, SO_{2} emissions have dropped 40%, and according to the Pacific Research Institute, acid rain levels have dropped 65% since 1976. However, although it reduced emissions by 40%, the US Acid Rain Program has not reduced SO_{2} emissions as much as the conventional regulation applied in the European Union (EU), which reduced SO_{2} emissions by more than 70%. Therefore, the effectiveness of the emissions trading element as a mechanism has been criticised, since the EPA also used regulations to achieve the reductions, as all areas of the country "had to meet national, health-based, air quality standards that are separate from the Acid Rain Program’s requirements".

In 2007, total SO_{2} emissions were 8.9 million tons, achieving the program's long-term goal ahead of the 2010 statutory deadline. In 2008, SO_{2} emissions dropped even lower—to 7.6 million tons, which was considerably lower than of command-and-control regulations.

The EPA estimates that by 2010, the overall costs of complying with the program for businesses and consumers will be $1 billion to $2 billion a year, only one fourth of what was originally predicted.

A general issue with cap and trade programs has been overallocation, whereby the cap is high enough that sources of emissions do not need to reduce their emissions. ARP had "early overallocation" during Phase I, and this allowed emission sources to "bank" their allowances for future years. In Phase II, emission sources drew down their banked allowances. In 2006, emissions were again below the cap, leading to further banking.

== Retirement fund ==
The Acid Rain Retirement Fund (A.R.R.F) is an all-volunteer, non-profit environmental educational organization, incorporated in Maine, dedicated to reducing pollution by purchasing and "retiring" marketable sulfur dioxide emissions allowances issued by the U.S. Environmental Protection Agency’s Acid Rain Program. A.R.R.F. was created in 1995 and purchased its first allowances in that year. It provides citizens with information about access to pollution markets, along with the ability to directly prevent pollution.

=== Marketable emissions allowances ===
Pursuant to the Clean Air Act of 1990, each year in March the U.S. Environmental Protection Agency auctions off to the highest bidder about 250,000 pollution allowances that enable companies to emit one ton of sulfur dioxide. Those companies face statutory penalties of $2,000/ton for every ton of sulfur dioxide they emit in excess of those for which they own allowances. Emissions allowances are bought and sold daily through the Chicago Board of Trade like soybeans, rice or any other commodity. Only a limited number of allowances are available each year. After those allowances are used, no more can be issued. The Acid Rain Retirement Fund raises money and bids alongside polluters in the annual auctions for as many allowances as their funds can buy. But instead of using or trading them, A.R.R.F. retires them permanently, taking allowances off the market and keeping sulfur dioxide out of the air. Thus, every pollution allowance A.R.R.F. removes from circulation prevents that pollution from being legally emitted into the air.

=== Impact of sulfur dioxide ===
Sulfur dioxide is the principal contributor to acid rain, causing respiratory disorders, impairing visibility, harming the health of fish and wildlife, and degrading lakes and ponds. Research has shown lakes and streams in New England have been slow to recover from the effect of acid rain, compared to some in Wisconsin, New York and Pennsylvania. Acid rain brings with it mercury deposition, and together they cause tremendous damage to human health and the environment. Research by the Hubbard Brook Research Foundation recently identified nine suspected mercury hotspots in the northeastern U.S. and Canada. Harvard University economist Robert Stavins estimates about $1 billion per year has been saved in the United States by cleaning up since the Acid Rain Program went into effect.

=== Educational programs ===
The Acid Rain Retirement Fund uses participation in pollution markets as a way to educate children and adults about the sources and detrimental effects of air pollution and acid rain, and actions people can take to reduce such pollution. Presentations are made in school classrooms about the causes and effects of acid rain, and students are encouraged to design their own fundraising efforts.

=== Accomplishments ===
A.R.R.F. has participated in annual EPA auctions of emissions allowances every year since 1995, and in 2013 owns the right to emit 1,413 tons of sulfur dioxide per year, plus whatever amount it has not emitted in previous years. Because A.R.R.F. did not exercise its right to emit any pollution during 1996-2013, “banking” its emissions allowances for the future, A.R.R.F. in 2013 holds the legal right to emit a total of 2,322 tons (4,644,000 pounds) of sulfur dioxide in 2013. That amount will increase by another 100 tons in 2018 when allowances A.R.R.F. purchased in the 7-year advance auction of 2011 are eligible for use.

According to A.R.R.F., EPA auction results 1993-2013 indicate groups or individuals who purchased emissions allowances for purposes other than releasing air pollution own the right to emit 3,188 tons per year of sulfur dioxide. Although most have purchased only one or a few tons, this adds up to considerably more than the 760 tons/year allocated by law to the Miami Fort #5 generating unit in Ohio.

Since many purchases were made in earlier years, and unused allowances have accumulated, these groups now own the right to emit 23,012 tons of sulfur dioxide in 2013. That's more than the annual allocation of allowances to 168 of the 250 dirtiest generating units in the United States (some are allowed to emit almost 95,000 tons/year).

== See also ==
- Continuous emissions monitoring system
