= Altınelma =

Coordinates: 38.367°N 36.874°E

Altınelma is a village of about 1700 people in Turkey. The Afşin-Elbistan power stations are nearby and according to Greenpeace this is why many people complain of asthma.
