= Çoğulhan =

Village in Kahramanmaraş Province, Turkey

- Village
- Location within Turkey
- Coordinates: 38°20′33″N 37°01′02″E
- Country: Turkey
- Province: Kahramanmaraş Province
- District: Afşin
- Time zone: UTC3

Çoğulhan is a village in Afşin district of Kahramanmaraş province in Turkey. Due to the nearby Afşin Elbistan power stations it has almost three times the level of sulfur dioxide in the air than Elbistan.
