= Right to Clean Air Platform Turkey =

Group of Turkish non-governmental organizations against air pollution

- Temiz Hava Hakkı Platformu
- Formation: 2015
- Type: non-governmental organization
- Location: Turkey
- Region served: Turkey
- Website: www.temizhavahakki.org

Right to Clean Air Platform Turkey (RtCAP) (Turkish: Temiz Hava Hakkı Platformu) is an independent non-governmental organisation exclusively focused on the issue of air pollution in Turkey.

In 2023 they said that air pollution is four times World Health Organization guidelines.

== Objectives ==
To protect public health RtCAP aims to clean up Turkey's air until it at least meets the World Health Organization's (WHO) recommended safe level.

In 2018 RtCAP published 10 policy recommendations for the government:

1. Reliably measure air pollution
2. Legislate to meet WHO air pollution guidelines
3. Include PM 2.5 in the above
4. Release more data to the public
5. Use up to date atmospheric dispersion modeling in environmental impact assessments
6. Introduce health impact assessment
7. Stop subsidizing fossil fuels
8. Improve legislation to prevent and compensate for air pollution
9. Promote alternatives to polluting activities
10. Cooperate between government departments and also with NGOs and professional associations

== Members ==
The members of the platform are: CAN Europe, General Practitioner Association of Turkey, Greenpeace Mediterranean, Green Peace Law Association, Green Thought Association, Health and Environment Alliance (HEAL), Physicians for Environment Association, TEMA Foundation (The Turkish Foundation for Combating Soil Erosion, for Reforestation and the Protection of Natural Habitats), Turkish Medical Association (TTB), Turkish Neurological Society, Turkish Respiratory Society, Turkish Society of Occupational Health Specialists (İMUD), Turkish Society of Public Health Specialists (HASUDER), Yuva Association, WWF Turkey, 350.org

== Work ==
The platform follows on from Byzantine emperor Justinian I who acknowledged the importance of clean air in 535 AD, and the constitution of the Turkish republic which says that "It is the duty of the State and citizens to improve the natural environment, to protect the environmental health and to prevent environmental pollution.

=== Coal ===
In 2019 the platform lobbied parliamentarians to restrict pollution from coal fired power stations in Turkey, and carried out awareness raising and advocacy through the national press. Parliament later voted to restrict this pollution. They also campaign against Turkey's subsidies to coal.

=== Particulates ===
The platform is campaigning for Turkey to set a legal limit on the atmospheric fine particulates known as PM 2.5. They state that over 50,000 deaths could have been prevented in 2017 if PM2.5 had been below WHO guidelines. In 2023 they published a report saying that Turkey’s average PM 2.5 was 20, four times the WHO guidelines.

=== Air quality monitoring ===
In 2023 the group said that half of the 360 Ministry of Environment, Urbanization and Climate Change air quality monitoring stations were inadequate.
