= Continuous emissions monitoring system =

Tool to monitor the effluent gas streams resulting from combustion in industrial processe

Continuous emission monitoring systems (CEMS) are used as a tool to monitor the effluent gas streams resulting from combustion in industrial processes. CEMS can measure flue gas for oxygen, carbon monoxide and carbon dioxide to provide information for combustion control in industrial settings. They are also used as a means to comply with air emission standards such as the United States Environmental Protection Agency's (EPA) Acid Rain Program, other US federal emission programs, or state permitted emission standards. CEMS typically consist of analyzers to measure gas concentrations within the stream, equipment to direct a sample of that gas stream to the analyzers if they are remote, equipment to condition the sample gas by removing water and other components that could interfere with the reading, pneumatic plumbing with valves that can be controlled by a PLC to route the sample gas to and away from the analyzers, a calibration and maintenance system that allows for the injection of calibration gases into the sample line, and a Data Acquisition and Handling System (DAHS) that collects and stores each data point and can perform necessary calculations required to get total mass emissions. A CEMS operates at all times even if the process it measures is not on. They can continuously collect, record and report emissions data for process monitoring and/or for compliance purposes.

The standard CEM system consists of a sample probe, filter, sample line (umbilical), gas conditioning system, calibration gas system, and a series of gas analyzers which reflect the parameters being monitored. Typical monitored emissions include: sulfur dioxide, nitrogen oxides, carbon monoxide, carbon dioxide, hydrogen chloride, airborne particulate matter, mercury, volatile organic compounds, and oxygen. CEM systems can also measure air flow, flue gas opacity and moisture. A monitoring system that measures particulate matter is referred to as a PEMS.

In the U.S., the EPA requires a data acquisition and handling system to collect and report the data. Measurements of concentration can be converted to mass/hour by including flow rate measurements. The types of gases being measured and the calculations required are dependent upon the source type and each source type has its own subpart under 40 CFR part 60 and part 75. SO_{2} emissions are measured in pounds per hour using both an SO_{2} pollutant concentration monitor and a volumetric flow monitor. For NO_{x}, both a NO_{x} pollutant concentration monitor and a diluent gas monitor are used to determine the emissions rate in weight per volume or weight per heat value (for example lbs/million Btu, lbs/ft^{3}, kg/kWh or kg/m^{3}). Opacity measurements are sometimes required, depending on the source type. CO_{2} measuring is sometimes a requirement, however if monitored, a CO_{2} or oxygen monitor plus a flow monitor should be used. The DAHS must be able to collect, record and store data, usually at 1-minute intervals. For compliance purposes, a DAHS must be in continuous operation 24/7/365 even when no process is on. For a valid measurement, the DAHS must record at least one reading every 15 minutes for 3 out of 4 quarters. The readings are then averaged hourly.

== Operation ==
A small sample of flue gas is extracted, by means of a pump, into the CEM system via a sample probe. Facilities that combust fossil fuels often use a dilution-extractive probe to dilute the sample with clean, dry air to a ratio typically between 50:1 to 200:1, but usually 100:1. Dilution is used because pure flue gas can be hot, wet and, with some pollutants, sticky. Once diluted to the appropriate ratio, the sample is transported through a sample line (typically referred to as an umbilical) to a manifold from which individual analyzers may extract a sample. Gas analyzers employ various techniques to accurately measure concentrations. Some commonly used techniques include: infrared and ultraviolet adsorption, chemiluminescence, fluorescence and beta ray absorption. After analysis, the gas exits the analyzer to a common manifold to all analyzers where it is vented out of doors. A Data Acquisition and Handling System (DAHS) receives the signal output from each analyzer in order to collect and record emissions data.

Another sample extraction method used in industrial sources and utility sources with low emission rates, is commonly referred to as a "dry extractive", "hot dry" extractive, or "direct" CEMS. The sample is not diluted, but is carried along a heated sample line at high temperature into a sample conditioning unit. The sample is filtered to remove particulate matter and dried, usually with a chiller, to remove moisture. Once conditioned, the sample enters a sampling manifold and is measured by various gas analyzers, typically NO_{x} and O_{2} (and sometimes CO) for combustion turbines and engines running natural gas or diesel. NO_{x} analyzers typically work using chemiluminescence. O_{2} analyzers a magnetic field which attracts O_{2} to measure the concentration. The O_{2} causes movement of a suspended mirror within the analyzer which then changes the amount of light being reflected by that mirror onto a photocell. The amount of current required to move the mirror back to center is proportional to the O_{2} concentration. The ability to measure % oxygen in the sample is required to perform the required calculations.

== Quality assurance ==
Accuracy of the system is demonstrated in several ways. An internal quality assurance check is achieved by daily introduction of a certified concentration of gas to the sample probe. The CEMS measurement is then compared against the known concentration to arrive at a Calibration Error percentage. A zero gas reading is also taken and compared. If the calibration error % exceeds 2x the performance specification for 5 consecutive days or 4x the performance specification in 24 hours, the CEMS is considered out of control meaning the data can not be relied upon as accurate until it is brought back into control. Data substitution will be used for out of control periods. The data substitution method is generally not advantageous so it is critical to get the CEMS back into control as soon as possible.

The EPA also allows for the use of Continuous Emissions Monitoring Calibration Systems which dilute gases to generate calibration standards. The analyzer reading must be accurate to a certain percentage. The percent accuracy can vary, but most fall between 2.5% and 5%. In power stations affected by the Acid Rain Program, annual (or bi-annual) certification of the system must be performed by an independent firm. The firm will have an independent CEM system temporarily in place to collect emissions data in parallel with the plant CEMS. This testing is referred to as a Relative Accuracy Test Audit (RATA).

In the U.S., periodic evaluations of the equipment must be reported and recorded. This includes daily calibration error tests, daily interference tests for flow monitors, and semi-annual (or annual) RATA and bias tests. CEMS equipment is expensive and not always affordable for a facility. In such cases, a facility will install non-EPA compliant analysis equipment at the emissions point. Once yearly, for the equipment evaluation, a mobile CEMS company measures emissions with compliant equipment. The results are then compared to the non-compliant analyzer system.
