= Health and Environment Alliance =

European environmental non-profit

- Abbreviation: HEAL
- Type: Nonprofit
- Headquarters: Brussels
- Website: env-health.org

The Health and Environment Alliance is a European non-profit organization addressing how the natural and built environments affect health in Europe. It was created in 2004 and is a network of health and environmental groups. It has campaigned against the herbicide glyphosate, coal power in Turkey, and also wants EU air quality standards to meet World Health Organization guidelines.
