= Energy value of coal =

The energy value of coal, or fuel content, is the amount of potential energy coal contains that can be converted into heat. This value can be calculated and compared with different grades of coal and other combustible materials, which produce different amounts of heat according to their grade.

While chemistry provides ways of calculating the heating value of a certain amount of a substance, there is a difference between this theoretical value and its application to real coal. The grade of a sample of coal does not precisely define its chemical composition, so calculating the coal's actual usefulness as a fuel requires determining its proximate and ultimate analysis (see "Chemical Composition" below).

== Chemical composition ==
Chemical composition of the coal is defined in terms of its proximate and ultimate (elemental) analyses. The parameters of proximate analysis are moisture, volatile matter, ash, and fixed carbon. Elemental or ultimate analysis encompasses the quantitative determination of carbon, hydrogen, nitrogen, sulfur and oxygen within the coal. Additionally, specific physical and mechanical properties of coal and particular carbonization properties

The calorific value Q of coal [kJ/kg] is the heat liberated by its complete combustion with oxygen. Q is a complex function of the elemental composition of the coal. Q can be determined experimentally using calorimeters. Dulong suggests the following approximate formula for Q when the oxygen content is less than 10%:

Q = 337C + 1442(H - O/8) + 93S,

where C is the mass percent of carbon, H is the mass percent of hydrogen, O is the mass percent of oxygen, and S is the mass percent of sulfur in the coal. With these constants, Q is given in kilojoules per kilogram.

== See also ==
- Coal assay techniques
- Energies per unit mass
- Heat of combustion
