= Çöllolar coal mine =

Coal mine in Turkey

Çöllolar Coal Mine
- Location: Kahramanmaraş Province, Turkey
- Products: Lignite
- Closed: 2011

Çöllolar Coal Mine was a coal mine in Kahramanmaraş Province in Turkey which was destroyed in a landslide in 2011 with the loss of 10 lives. In 2019 it was tendered for sale.
