= Alparslan Bayraktar =

Turkish engineer and politician (born 1975)

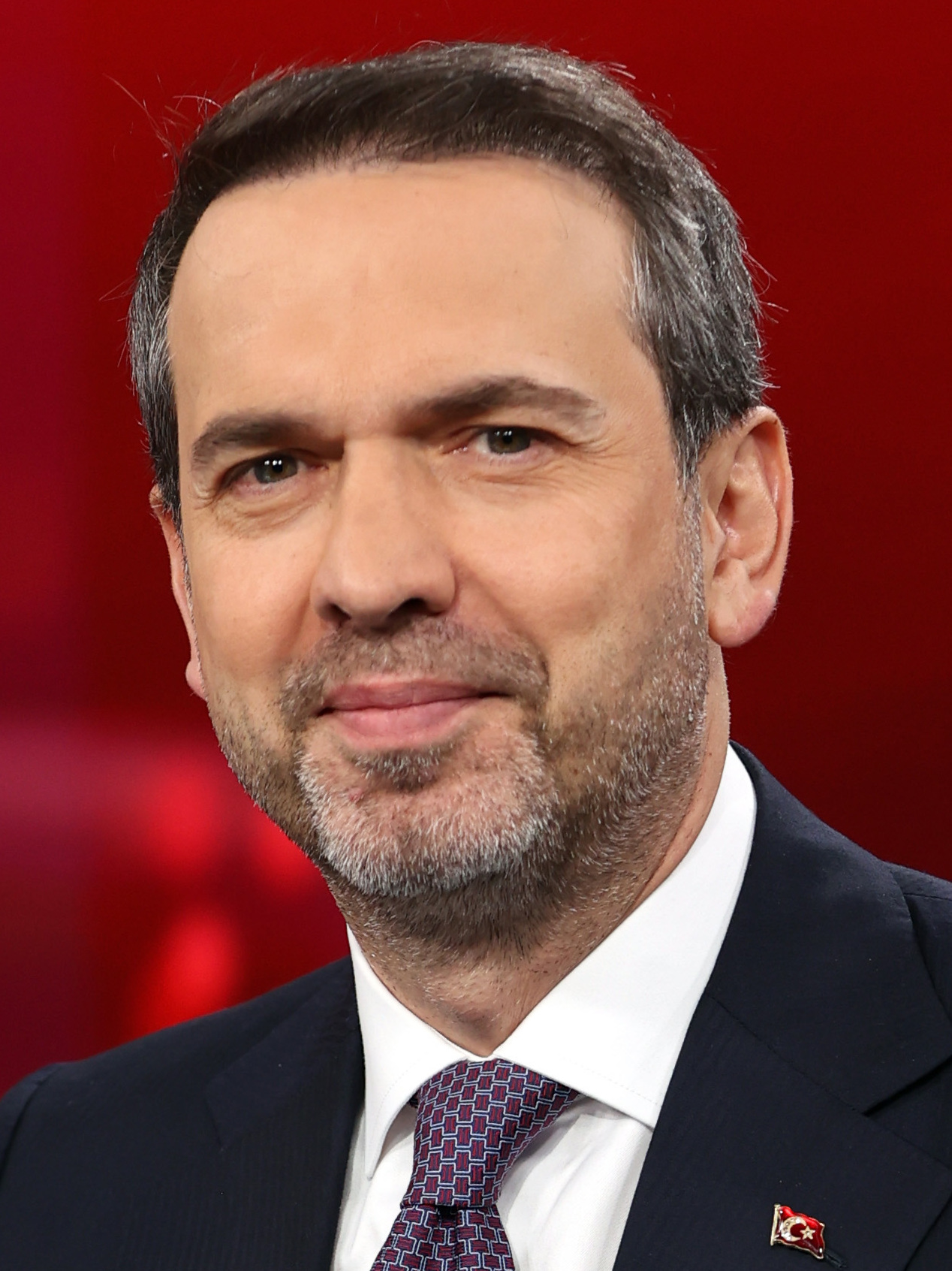
- Bayraktar in 2024

Minister of Energy and Natural Resources
- Incumbent
- Assumed office 4 June 2023
- President: Recep Tayyip Erdoğan
- Preceded by: Fatih Dönmez

Personal details
- Born: 1975 (age 50–51) Kırıkhan, Hatay, Turkey
- Party: Justice and Development Party
- Education: Istanbul Technical University (BS); Tufts University (MA); Bilkent University (MA); Middle East Technical University (PhD)

Alparslan Bayraktar (born 1975) is a Turkish academic, engineer, and politician. He has served as the Minister of Energy and Natural Resources since 2023. Before being elected to this position, he served as the deputy minister and a commissioner of the Energy Market Regulatory Authority. Bayraktar has also served as the chair of the World Energy Council for Turkey since 2015, and as the chair of the Istanbul Center for Regulation since 2018.

== Early life and education ==
Bayraktar was born on July 9, 1975, in Kırıkhan, Hatay Province, Turkey. His family was originally from Trabzon but later relocated to Ankara, where he completed his education.

Bayraktar earned a Bachelor of Science in Mechanical Engineering from Istanbul Technical University, and a Master of Arts, as well as education in International Relations, from the Fletcher School of Law and Diplomacy, Tufts University in Massachusetts. Moreover, he also obtained a Master's Degree in Law and Economics from Bilkent University in Ankara. He received his PhD in Energy, Environmental Economics, and Policy from Middle East Technical University (METU) in Turkey, focusing his research on "A Multidimensional Analysis of Turkish-German Low Carbon Energy Transitions."

== Career ==
=== Academic career ===
Bayraktar has lectured at Bilkent University in Ankara for the Energy Economics, Policy, and Security (EEPS) program and at Middle East Technical University in Ankara.

=== Political career ===
Bayraktar was appointed Minister of Energy and Natural Resources of Turkey on June 4, 2023. He began his political career as a Commissioner of the Energy Market Regulatory Authority from 2010 to 2016. Following this, he served as the General Director of International Affairs and the European Union from 2016 to 2018, which led to his appointment as Deputy Undersecretary. From 2018 until 2023, he held the position of Deputy Minister.

While Deputy Minister, Bayraktar contributed to the "Turkish Energy Transition 1.0" initiative, which played a role in the development of Turkey's National Energy and Mining Strategy. He earlier worked on guidelines to ensure effective energy supply and encourage the adoption of clean energy. Following the announcement of Turkey's National Energy and Mining Strategy was announced in 2017, Bayraktar then detailed plans for "Turkish Energy Transition 2.0." The second phase of the initiative focused on energy supply security policies decrease the country's reliance on imported energy sources and expanding the role of renewable energy in Turkey's energy mix.

Bayraktar has spoken at international energy conferences, discussing carbon neutrality (global net-zero emissions) and Turkey's nuclear energy policies.

Political offices
Preceded by Fatih Dönmez	Minister of Energy and Natural Resources; 4 June 2023 – present	Incumbent
