= EMRA =

EMRA may refer to:

- East Midlands Regional Assembly, a regional assembly in the United Kingdom
- Eastern and Midland Regional Assembly, a regional assembly in Ireland
- Emergency Medicine Residents' Association, an American medical organization
- Energy Market Regulatory Authority for energy in Turkey
