= Fatih Dönmez =

Turkish engineer and politician (born 1965)

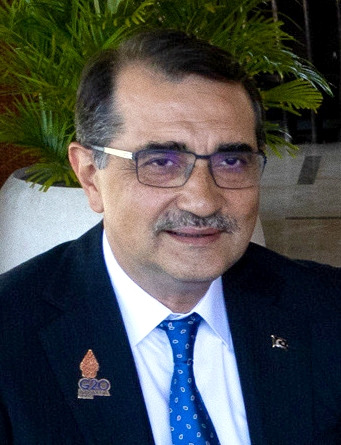

Minister of Energy and Natural Resources
- In office 10 July 2018 – 4 June 2023
- President: Recep Tayyip Erdoğan
- Preceded by: Berat Albayrak
- Succeeded by: Alparslan Bayraktar

Personal details
- Born: 1965 (age 60–61) Bilecik
- Party: Justice and Development Party
- Education: Yıldız Technical University
- Occupation: Engineer and politician

Fatih Dönmez (born 1965) is a Turkish engineer, politician and former Turkish Minister of Energy and Natural Resources from 2018 to 2023.

A member of the Justice and Development Party, he was elected to the Grand National Assembly of Turkey in the 2023 parliamentary election from Eskişehir.

== Education and early life ==
Fatih Dönmez was born in Bilecik and attended primary, secondary and high school in Istanbul. He studied electronic engineering at the Yildiz Technical University, from which he graduated in 1987. In 2005, he obtained also a Master of Business Administration.

== Professional career ==
From 1994 onwards, he worked in several positions at İGDAŞ, one of the main energy providers for Istanbul, which also manages the several gas pipelines surrounding the city. IGDAS is administered by the Municipality of Istanbul. Amongst other positions, he also served as a member of the board and its Vice General Manager.

== Political career ==
He became a member of the board of the Turkish Energy Market Regulatory Authority (EMRA). in 2008, and following was involved in negotiations relating to the interoperability between energy markets of Turkey and the European Union. On 24 December 2015, he began to work as Undersecretary in the Ministry of Energy and Natural Resources of Berat Albayrak. On the 10 July 2018, he succeeded Berat Albayrak and was appointed as Minister of Energy and Natural Resources in the Government of Recep Tayyip Erdoğan. In January 2020, he took part in the launch of the pipeline TurkStream, which transports Russian natural gas to Turkey and Europe. He is also in favor of the re-negotiation of the Treaty of Lausanne, which settled the borders between Greece and Turkey.

He was elected to the Grand National Assembly of Turkey in the 2023 parliamentary election from Eskişehir.

== Personal life ==
Fatih Dönmez is married and the father of three children.

Political offices
Preceded by Berat Albayrak	Minister of Energy and Natural Resources; 10 July 2018 – 4 June 2023	Succeeded by Alparslan Bayraktar
