= SHURA Energy Transition Center =

Clean energy think tank in Turkey

- SHURA Enerji Dönüşümü Merkezi
- Website: shura.org.tr/en/

SHURA Energy Transition Center is a think tank which researches the transition of energy in Turkey from fossil gas, coal and oil to sustainable energy. Some of its recommendations have been incorporated into the policy of the Ministry of Energy and Natural Resources.

== History ==
It was created in 2018 by the European Climate Foundation, Agora Energiewende, and Sabancı University Istanbul Policy Center.
