= Berat Albayrak =

Turkish businessman and politician (born 1978)

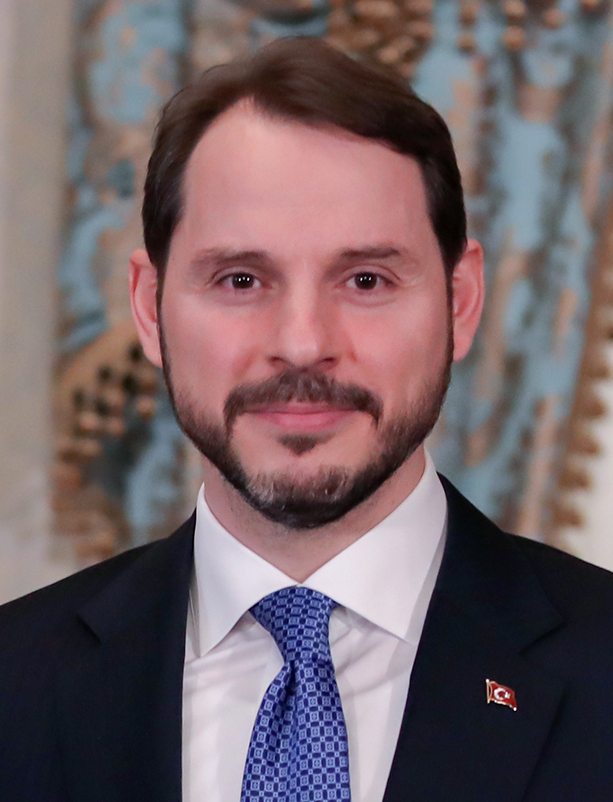

Minister of Treasury and Finance
- In office 10 July 2018 – 10 November 2020
- President: Recep Tayyip Erdoğan
- Preceded by: Naci Ağbal
- Succeeded by: Lütfi Elvan

Minister of Energy and Natural Resources
- In office 24 November 2015 – 10 July 2018
- Prime Minister: Ahmet Davutoğlu; Binali Yıldırım
- Preceded by: Ali Rıza Alaboyun
- Succeeded by: Fatih Dönmez

Member of the Grand National Assembly
- In office 7 June 2015 – 10 July 2018
- Constituency: Istanbul (I) (June 2015, Nov 2015, 2018)

Personal details
- Born: 21 February 1978 (age 48) Istanbul, Turkey
- Party: Justice and Development Party
- Spouse: Esra Erdoğan (m. 2004)
- Children: 4
- Parent(s): Sadık Albayrak; Kıymet Albayrak
- Relatives: Recep Tayyip Erdoğan (father-in-law); Emine Erdoğan (mother-in-law)
- Education: Istanbul University; Pace University; Kadir Has University

Berat Albayrak (Turkish pronunciation: [beɾat aɫˈbajɾak] born 21 February 1978) is a Turkish businessman and politician who served as the Minister of Energy and Natural Resources from 2015 to 2018 and as the minister of treasury and finance from 2018 to 2020. In the general elections of June 2015 and November 2015, he was elected as a member of parliament from Istanbul for the Justice and Development Party. He is married to Esra Erdoğan, the daughter of Turkey's president, Recep Tayyip Erdoğan.

== Early life and education ==
Berat Albayrak was born in Istanbul on 21 February 1978 to Sadık Albayrak and his wife Kıymet. His family is originally from Dernekpazarı, Trabzon. He completed his primary education at Fındıkzade Elementary School and his secondary education at Fatih Boys' High School.

After graduating from Istanbul University's Department of Business Administration (English) in 1999, he earned a master's degree in finance from the Lubin School of Business at Pace University, New York City, in 2004. In 2011, he obtained a PhD from Kadir Has University's Department of Banking and Finance with his dissertation titled "Renewable Energy Resources and Their Financing in Electricity Generation."

== Early career ==
Berat Albayrak began his professional career in 1996. In 1999, he joined Çalık Holding, where he took on various roles. Between 2002 and 2006, he served as the finance director at the company's United States office. Upon returning to Turkey in 2006, Albayrak was first appointed as the deputy general manager of financial affairs and later, in 2007, became the general manager.

In 2007, he oversaw Turkey's first Eurobond issuance by a holding company, managing a process that attracted approximately $1 billion in demand for a $200 million bond issuance. In 2008, Albayrak facilitated the sale of a foreign company in Turkey at 34 times the EBITDA value, marking one of the country's highest-value foreign company sales. During 2007–2008, he contributed to securing nearly $1 billion in direct foreign investment for Turkey.

At the end of 2013, Albayrak left the private sector and began writing for Sabah newspaper. During this period, he also taught courses in Banking and Finance at Marmara University and took on roles in various non-governmental organizations.

== Political career ==
Berat Albayrak entered the Turkish Grand National Assembly as a member of parliament for the Justice and Development Party (AKP) in the 7 June 2015 elections. On 12 September 2015, during the 5th Ordinary Congress of the AKP, he was appointed to the party's Central Executive and Decision Board (MKYK). Following the general elections of 1 November 2015, he became the minister of energy and natural resources in the 64th government, a position he also held in the 65th government. On 21 May 2017, at the 3rd Extraordinary Congress of the AKP, he was once again appointed to the MKYK.

After the 2017 constitutional referendum, which introduced the presidential system of government, Albayrak was appointed as the minister of treasury and finance in the first cabinet of the new system following the 2018 general elections. On 12 September 2018, he was also appointed as the deputy chairman of the Turkey Wealth Fund, and on 2 October 2018, he became a member of the Defense Industry Executive Committee by presidential decree.

Additionally, on 15 July 2018, Albayrak was selected as a member of the Supreme Military Council (YAŞ) by presidential decree. On 8 November 2020, he resigned from his position as Minister of Treasury and Finance for health reasons.

=== Ministry of Energy ===
During Berat Albayrak's tenure, significant energy exploration and infrastructure projects were launched. For the first time in Turkey, airborne gravity-magnetic data collection was implemented over a wide region, including Şemdinli, Cizre, Van, and Siirt. Additionally, the country's first deep drilling project was carried out in Çukurca, Hakkâri, reaching a depth of 4,500 meters. As a result of these initiatives, Turkey Petroleum Corporation (TPAO) is now producing 60,000 barrels of oil per day in the Şırnak/Gabar region, with plans to increase production to 100,000 barrels per day in the near future.

Albayrak also facilitated the inclusion of the Fatih, Yavuz, and Kanuni drilling ships in Turkey's fleet. Turkey's first drilling ship, Fatih, made a historic discovery of 710 billion cubic meters of natural gas in the Black Sea. This reserve, valued at approximately 1 trillion US dollars, is equivalent to Turkey's total export revenue for four years.

Under Albayrak's leadership, the foundation of the Akkuyu Nuclear Power Plant was laid in 2018. With an installed capacity of 4,800 MW and the ability to produce 35 billion kWh annually, Akkuyu is set to meet 10% of Turkey's electricity needs and is considered the largest project in the history of the Turkish Republic, with a total investment value of 20 billion US dollars.

The Trans-Anatolian Natural Gas Pipeline (TANAP), a 3,500-kilometer-long corridor, was also completed during this period. TANAP delivers 16 billion cubic meters of gas annually, with 6 billion cubic meters allocated for Turkey (covering 12% of the country's demand) and 10 billion cubic meters for Europe. The opening ceremony was attended by President of Turkey Recep Tayyip Erdoğan, Azerbaijani President Ilham Aliyev, Serbian President Aleksandar Vucic, Ukrainian President Petro Poroshenko, and TRNC President Mustafa Akıncı, Energy and Natural Resources Minister Berat Albayrak, SOCAR Azerbaijan oil company and TANAP Board chairman Rovnag Abdullayev, energy ministers from partner countries, energy company executives, and senior bureaucrats.

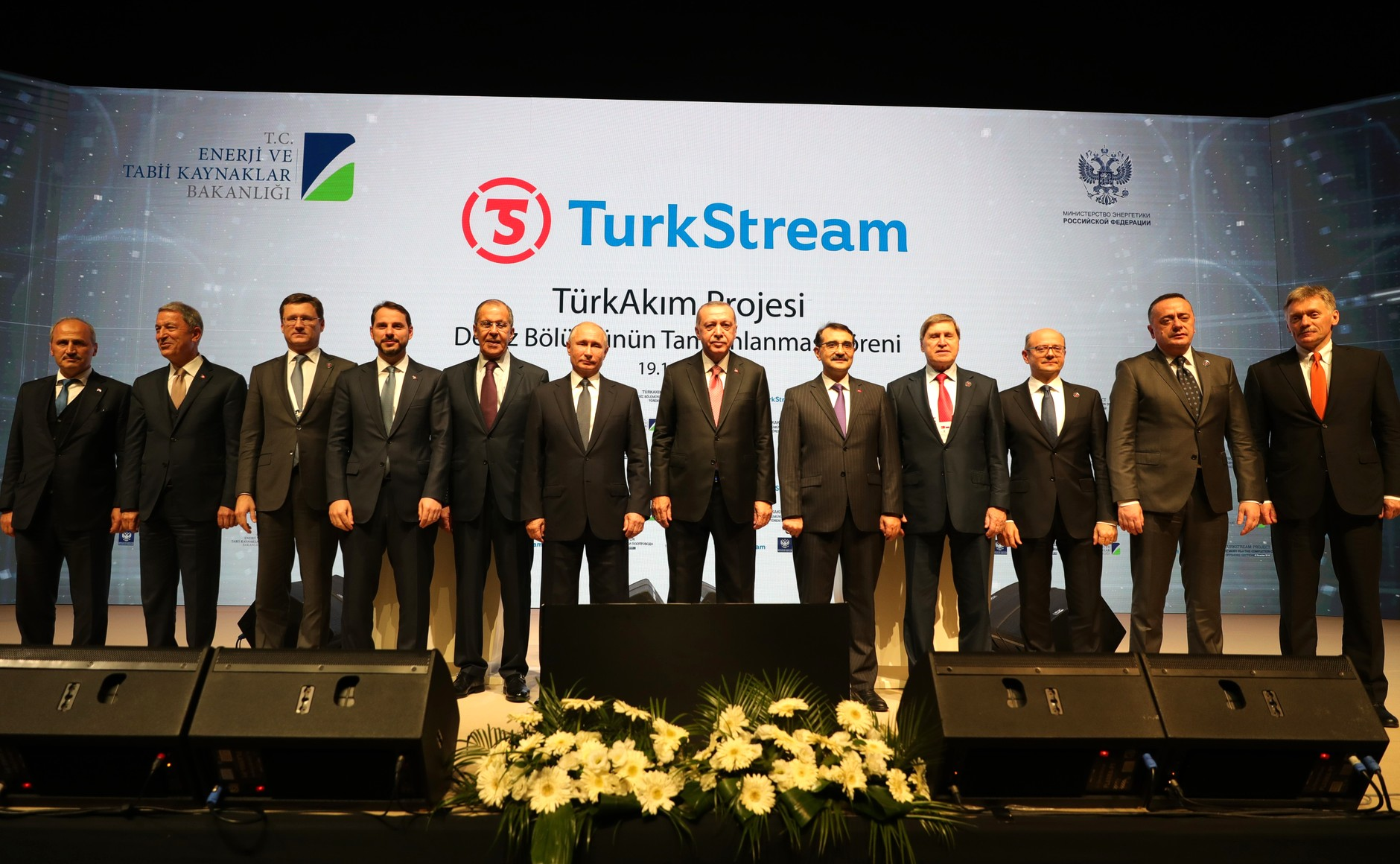
Opening ceremony of the offshore section of the TurkStream natural gas pipeline. 8 January 2020

Another key project completed under Albayrak's direction was the Turkish Stream pipeline, an alternative to the Western Stream, through which Turkey sourced natural gas from Russia via the transit routes of four other countries. With this project, Turkey took on a distribution role for natural gas.

In 2018, Albayrak also laid the foundation for the Bandırma Boron Carbide Production Facility, as part of Turkey's New Boron Strategy, aimed at processing boron for use in defense industries. This facility became operational on 19 March 2023.

As part of the National Energy and Mining Strategy, Albayrak oversaw the planning and implementation of 10,000 MW of wind energy and 10,000 MW of solar energy projects. A significant portion of these projects has already been realized. Under the "Smart Coal Use" strategy, new exploration and drilling activities were initiated, adding 5 billion tons of coal, valued at over 200 billion US dollars, to Turkey's national energy inventory during his tenure.

=== Ministry of Treasury and Finance ===
Berat Albayrak implemented a series of monetary and fiscal reforms to combat inflation, reducing it from around 25% to single digits within a year. Despite the challenges posed by the COVID-19 pandemic, inflation remained at approximately 11%. When he took office, the current account deficit stood at 57 billion dollars, but within a year, he managed to close the gap. By the end of 2019, the Turkish economy recorded a current account surplus of 5.3 billion dollars.

In 2020, through public banks, Turkey offered the longest-term and lowest-rate housing loans in its history (0.49%), allowing hundreds of thousands of lower and middle-income individuals to become homeowners.

One of the most strategic moves during Albayrak's tenure was repatriating Turkey's gold reserves from abroad. Approximately 350 tons of gold, previously held in the United States, Switzerland, and the United Kingdom, were returned to Turkey. The Central bank’s gold reserves increased from 488.9 tons at the end of 2018 to 556 tons by the end of 2019, and reached 719.2 tons by the end of 2020.

When Albayrak assumed office in June 2018, the Central Bank's reserves stood at 98.4 billion dollars. By the time he stepped down in November 2020, the reserves were 85.2 billion dollars, reflecting the impact of the pandemic. Nonetheless, in 2020, Turkey achieved 1.8% economic growth, making it one of the only two G20 countries, alongside China, to record growth during the pandemic year when most global economies contracted. The Central Bank's policy interest rate dropped to as low as 8.25% during this period, and the bank posted profits exceeding 165 billion Turkish lira (approximately 30 billion US dollars).

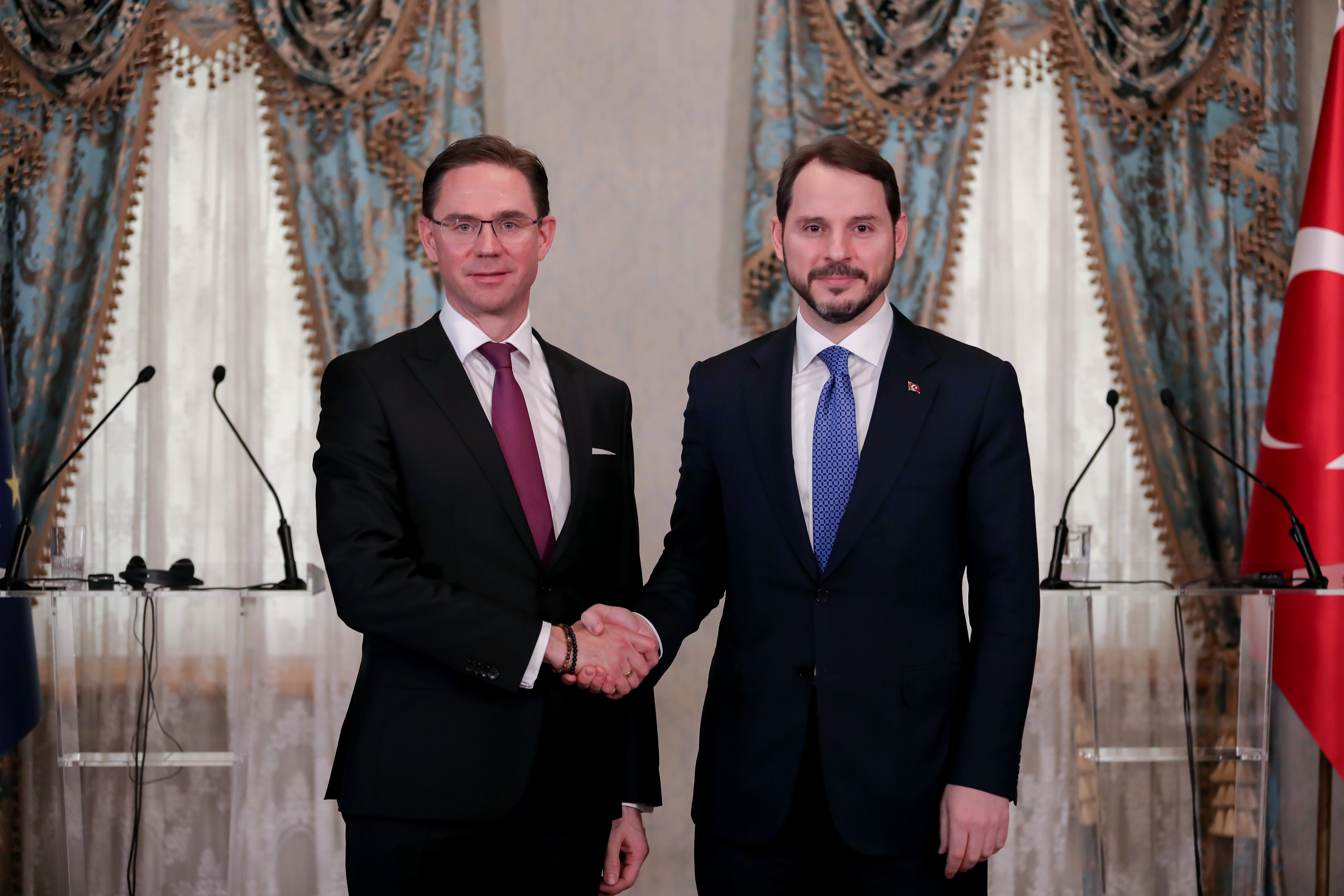
European Commission Vice President Jyrki Katainen and Minister of Treasury and Finance Berat Albayrak. 28 February 2019.

European Commission Vice President Jyrki Katainen and Treasury and Finance Minister Berat Albayrak met with European and Turkish business leaders in Istanbul as part of the High-Level Economic Dialogue. European Commission Vice-President Jyrki Katainen said at the meeting, "On behalf of the EU, I would like to emphasize that we are always willing to promote cooperation and engage in dialogue with the Turkish authorities. We view Turkey as a European country. Economic reforms are promising."

Albayrak's Treasury and Finance Ministry was recognized internationally, with Global Capital naming the ministry's debt management unit as the "Public Debt Management Office of the Year" globally. A leading Uk-based business magazine has awarded the Turkish Ministry of Finance and Treasury, headed by Berat Albayrak, for its successful performance in debt management despite difficult times. This award has caused a great stir among international financial commentators.

During his tenure, Albayrak also met with U.S. president Donald Trump at the Oval Office, where they discussed a range of issues, including the S-400 missile system, regional affairs, and bilateral trade relations. Jared Kushner, son-in-law of US President Donald Trump, was also present at the meeting held at the White House. Berat Albayrak announced at the White House that Turkey will grow by "2.5 percent" next year.

== Events and criticism ==
=== Economy ===
Since his appointment as Minister of Treasury and Finance in 2018, Berat Albayrak has faced various criticisms. Observers noted that his appointment raised concerns within financial circles, with fears about the concentration of too much power in the hands of a single politician.

While it is reported that Berat Albayrak is educated and knowledgeable, it has been stated in the media that his presentations to international investors and industry representatives in his capacity as Minister of Treasury and Finance have been persuasive. International financial commentators have emphasized their confidence in his ability to effectively communicate Turkey's economic policies and attract foreign investment.

=== Berat Albayrak's groundbreaking "green book legacy" ===
EIT RawMaterials, the largest and most active raw materials information and innovation network covering the entire raw materials value chain with 300 partner organizations, and which has established a strategic partnership to set up an interregional center in Turkey, opened the TETHYS Interregional Center in Turkey. Prof. Dr. Leyla Keser Berber, Chair of the TETHYS board of directors, stated, "Our strategy and roadmap for critical materials in Turkey were designed with the Green Book. This book was prepared by former Turkish Minister of Energy and Natural Resources Albayrak. I thank him for leaving us this groundbreaking legacy."

=== Football ===
Treasury and Finance Minister Berat Albayrak watched Trabzonspor play Sparta Prague in the third qualifying round of the UEFA Europa League and saw the fans' great interest in the match. Albayrak was delighted with Trabzonspor's goal.

During his visit to Trabzon, Berat Albayrak was presented with Trabzonspor's new season jersey, to which he replied, "But this jersey is from the 2010–2011 season. So it's the jersey from the championship season! “A video resurfaced of Berat Albayrak's father, Sadık Albayrak, saying at a Trabzonspor board meeting in 2017, "I ask those in management now, who built this stadium? You took out loans from national banks when no one else would give you credit."

== Personal life ==
In 2004, Albayrak married Esra Erdoğan, the eldest daughter of Turkey's then-prime minister and later president Recep Tayyip Erdoğan. The couple have four children.

== Bibliography ==
Berat Albayrak authored a book titled Burası Çok Önemli, in which he outlines the economic approaches and policies implemented during his tenures as Minister of Energy and Natural Resources and Minister of Treasury and Finance. The book is supported by examples and graphs that illustrate the efficiency aspects of the strategies he proposed.

== Awards ==
In October 2019, the U.K.-based business magazine GlobalCapital awarded Turkey's Finance and Treasury Ministry the Public Debt Management Office of the Year, for its "successful performance in debt management albeit difficult periods".

Political offices
Preceded by Ali Rıza Alaboyun	Ministry of Energy and Natural Resources; 24 November 2015 – 10 July 2018	Succeeded by Fatih Dönmez
Preceded by Naci Ağbal	Ministry of Treasury and Finance; 10 July 2018 – 10 November 2020	Succeeded by Lütfi Elvan
