= Sadık Albayrak =

Turkish journalist and author

- Born: 15 February 1942 (age 84); Dernekpazarı, Trabzon Province, Turkey
- Occupations: Journalist, author, politician
- Children: 2, including Berat Albayrak

Sadık Albayrak (born 15 February 1942) is a Turkish journalist and author of around 40 books. He ran for parliament in 1977 general election from National Salvation Party. He again ran for parliament from Welfare Party in 1991 and 1995. His 1980 book Son devir Osmanlı uleması won an award from the Writers Union of Turkey.

Albayrak has been friends with Turkish president Recep Tayyip Erdoğan since around 1980. In 2004, his son Berat married Erdoğan's daughter Esra. Albayrak's son Serhat is CEO of Calik Holding's Turkuvaz Media Group, while Berat is CEO of the holding.

== Books ==
- Son devir Osmanlı uleması (1980), Medrese Yayınevi
