= Energy in Turkey =

Energy consumption by source, Turkey

Energy consumption per person in Turkey is similar to the world average, and over 85 per cent is from fossil fuels. From 1990 to 2017 annual primary energy supply tripled, but then remained constant to 2019. In 2019, Turkey's primary energy supply included around 30 per cent oil, 30 per cent coal, and 25 per cent gas. These fossil fuels contribute to Turkey's air pollution and its above average greenhouse gas emissions. Turkey mines its own lignite (brown coal) but imports three-quarters of its energy, including half the coal and almost all the oil and gas it requires, and its energy policy prioritises reducing imports.

The OECD has criticised the lack of carbon pricing, fossil fuel subsidies and the country's under-utilized wind and solar potential. The country's electricity supplies 20% of its energy and is generated mainly from coal, gas and hydroelectricity; with a small but growing amount from wind, solar and geothermal. However, Black Sea gas is forecast to meet all residential demand from the late 2020s. A nuclear power plant is also under construction, and one half of installed power capacity is renewable energy. Despite this, from 1990 to 2019, carbon dioxide (CO_{2}) emissions from fuel combustion rose from 130 megatonnes (Mt) to 360 Mt. In 2023 energy consumption was forecast to increase almost 40% in the following 12 years.

Energy policy is to secure national energy supply and reduce fossil fuel imports, which accounted for over 20% of the cost of Turkey's imports in 2019, and 75 per cent of the current account deficit. This also includes using energy efficiently. However, as of 2019, little research has been done on the policies Turkey uses to reduce energy poverty, which also include some subsidies for home heating and electricity use. Turkey's energy policies plan to give "due consideration to environmental concerns all along the energy chain", "within the context of sustainable development." These plans have been criticised for being published over a year after work mentioned in it had started, not sufficiently involving the private sector, and for being inconsistent with Turkey's climate policy. For example in 2024 a minister said that by Turkey’s net zero year of 2053 half of primary energy would be from renewables and 30% from nuclear, but did not explain how the remaining 20% could be decarbonized.

== Policy and regulation ==
Development of carbon dioxide emissions

The Energy Market Regulatory Authority was created in 2001.

=== Security of supply ===
Turkey meets a quarter of its energy demand from national resources. The Centre for Economics and Foreign Policy Studies (EDAM), a think tank, says that in the 2010s, fossil fuel imports were probably the largest structural vulnerability of the country's economy: they cost $41 billion in 2019 representing about a fifth of Turkey's total import bill, and were a large part of the 2018 current account deficit and the country's debt problems. Although the country imports 99% of its natural gas and 93% of the petroleum it uses, in the early 2020s fossil gas supply was diversified to reduce dependence on Russia.

To secure energy supply, the government built new gas pipelines, and regasification plants. For example, gas supplies from Azerbaijan surpassed those from Russia in 2020. There is a large surplus of electricity generation capacity, however the government aims at meeting the forecast increase in demand for electricity in Turkey by building its first nuclear power plant and more solar, wind, hydro and coal-fired power plants. The International Climate Initiative says that, as an oil importer, Turkey can increase security of supply by increasing the proportion of renewable electricity it produces. The International Energy Agency has suggested a carbon market, and EDAM says that in the long term, a carbon tax would reduce import dependency by speeding development of national solar and wind energy.

Because the Turkish government is very centralised, its energy policy is national. Lack of transmission capacity was one cause of the nationwide blackout in 2015, therefore policy includes improving electricity transmission. As well as natural gas storage and regasification plants to convert imported liquid natural gas (LNG) to natural gas, the government supports pumped-storage hydroelectricity for long term energy storage.

In 2020, renewables generated 40% of Turkey's electricity, which reduced gas import costs: but, being mainly hydroelectricity, the amount that can be produced is vulnerable to drought. According to Hülya Saygılı, an economist at Turkey's central bank, although imports of solar and wind power components accounted for 12% of import costs in 2017, in EU countries this is largely due to one-time setup costs. She said that compared with Italy and Greece, Turkey has not invested enough in solar and wind power.

At the 2nd Istanbul Natural Resources Summit on 22 May 2026, President Erdoğan stated that Turkey has "distinguished itself both as a reliable partner in energy transport and as a key actor of peace," adding that the country's daily natural gas entry capacity had risen from 90 million to over 495 million cubic meters, making Turkey "one of the most powerful energy hubs of Europe."

=== Energy efficiency ===
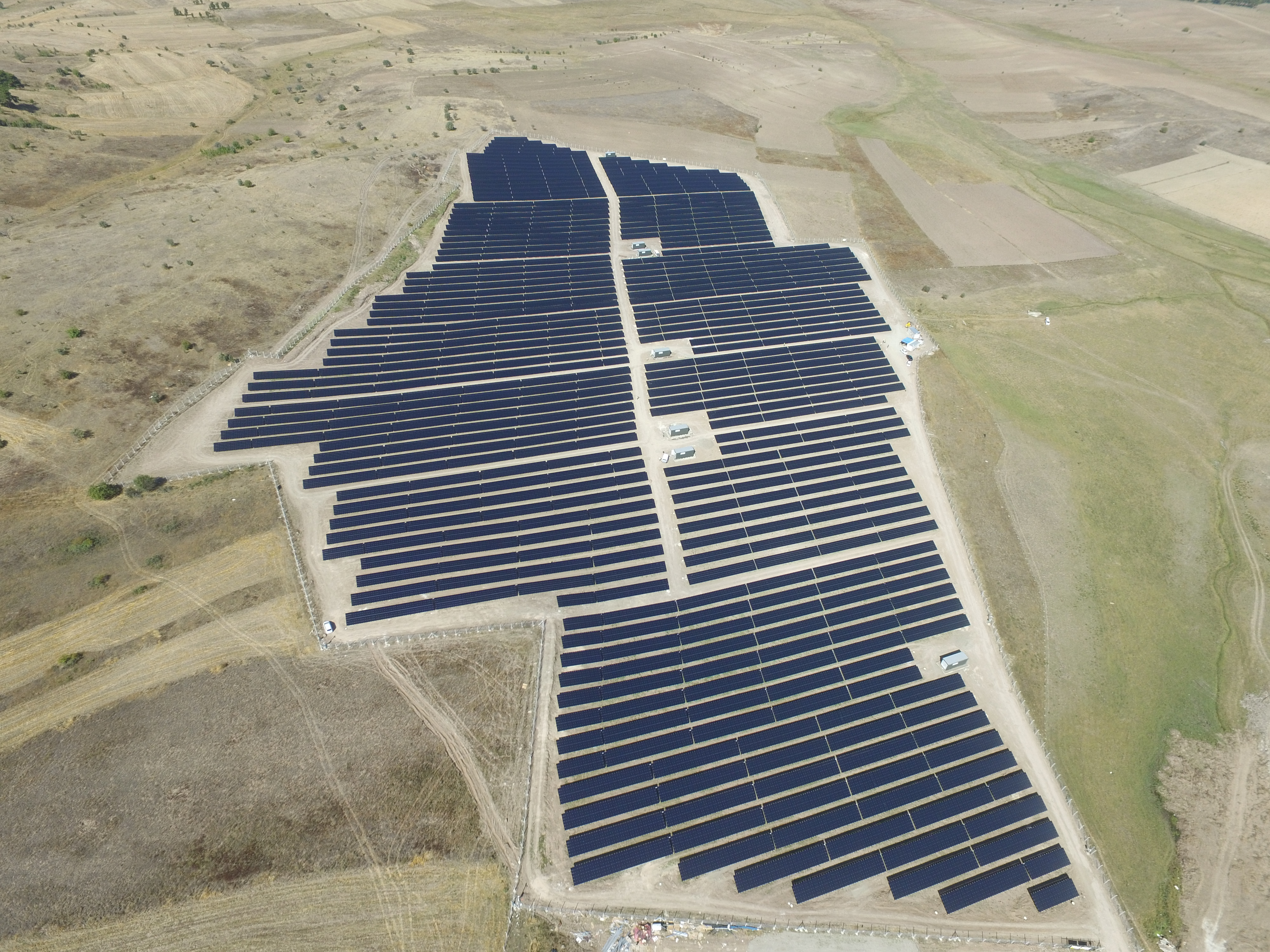
Karabuk Solar Energy Farm

The National Energy Efficiency plan aims to decrease Turkey's energy intensity—the energy required to produce ₺1 (Turkish lira) of GDP—to the OECD average by 2023. Despite the Energy Efficiency Law and a target to reduce its energy intensity by at least 20% between 2011 and 2023; between 2005 and 2015, Turkey's energy intensity increased by seven per cent. According to one study, if energy policy was changed—most importantly the removal of fossil fuel subsidies—at least 20% of energy costs could be saved, and according to the Chamber of Mechanical Engineers, the energy required for buildings could be cut by half. In 2019, Energy Minister Fatih Dönmez said that improvement of the energy efficiency of public buildings should take the lead and that efficiency improvements are an important source of jobs. It has been suggested that more specific energy efficiency targets for buildings are needed.

According to the Ministry of Energy and Natural Resources, Turkey has the potential to cut 15% to 20% of total consumption through energy conservation.

=== Fossil fuel subsidies and taxes ===
In the 21st century, Turkey's fossil fuel subsidies are around 0.2% of GDP, including at least US$14 billion (US$169 per person) between January 2020 and September 2021. If unpaid damages (such as health damage from air pollution) are included road fuel subsidy is estimated at over 400 dollars per person per year and for all fossil fuels over one thousand dollars. Data on finance for fossil fuels by state-owned banks and export credit agencies is not public. The energy minister Fatih Dönmez supports coal and most energy subsidies are for coal, which the OECD has strongly criticised. Capacity mechanism payments to coal-fired power stations in Turkey in 2019 totalled ₺720 million (US$130 million) compared to ₺542 million (US$96 million) to gas-fired power stations in Turkey. In 2022 these payments totalled over US$200 million. As of 2020, the tax per unit energy on gasoline was higher than diesel, despite diesel cars on average emitting more lung damaging NOx (nitrogen oxide).

==== Oil and gas subsidies and taxes ====
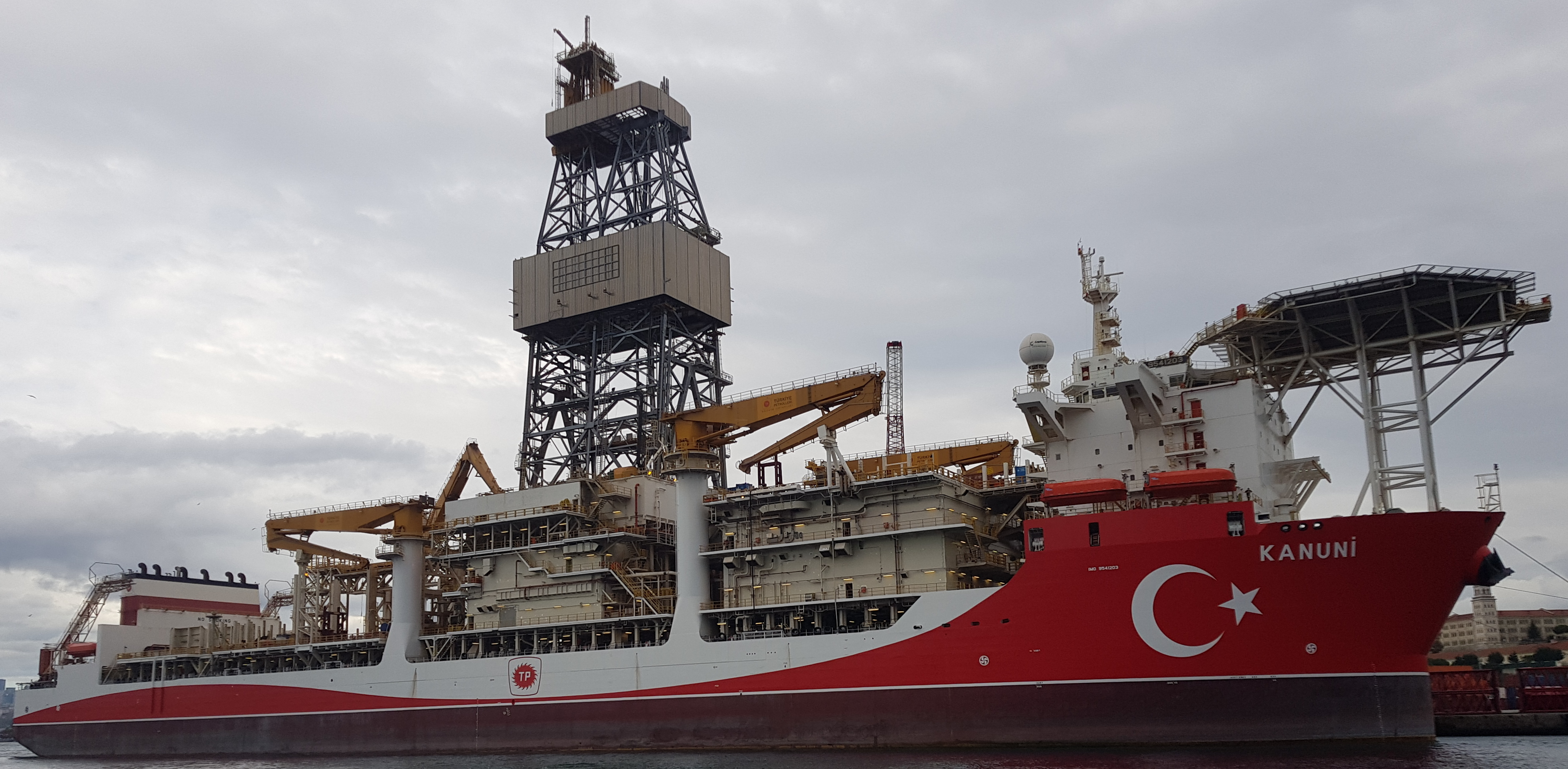
The Kanuni is an offshore deep-sea drilling ship.

In Turkey, tax levied on diesel is lower than that on petrol, and it has been suggested by the Istanbul International Centre for Energy and Climate at Sabancı University that taxes on diesel and petrol should be more-closely aligned with each other to minimise imports, because Turkey has enough petrol-refining capacity.

In 2022 the Turkish Energy Minister said Turkey and Algeria would create a joint oil-and-gas-exploration company.

The wholesale gas market is not as competitive in Turkey as it is in the EU: some analysts say that this is because the government does not want to split up the state-owned gas company BOTAŞ, or give other power companies fair use of BOTAŞ' pipelines. They say Turkey has not joined the European gas network (ENTSO-G) because joining would require this unbundling. BOTAŞ controls over 90% of the natural gas market, and is the gas infrastructure regulator and the only operator of gas transmission. Exploration for gas in the Eastern Mediterranean is subsidised, and is a cause of geopolitical tension because of the Cyprus dispute.

A capacity market (or capacity mechanism) for electricity is payments to make sure that sufficient firm power is available to satisfy peaks in demand, such as late afternoon air conditioning in August. Because gas-fired power stations can usually ramp up and down quickly they are one way of ensuring supply at times of peak demand. Some other countries also have capacity markets but Turkey's has been criticised. The government says the purpose of capacity market payments is to secure national electricity supply. However, despite almost all natural gas being imported, some gas-fired power plants received capacity payments in 2021, whereas some non-fossil firm power, such as demand response, could not. 17 gas-fired power stations were eligible for capacity payments in 2023.

==== Coal subsidies and taxes ====
Coal in Turkey is heavily subsidized. As of 2019, the government aims to keep the share of coal in the energy portfolio at around the same level in the medium to long term. Coal's place in the government's energy policy was detailed in 2019 by the Foundation for Political, Economic and Social Research (SETA), an organisation that lobbies for the Turkish government. Despite protests against coal power plants, construction of Emba Hunutlu was subsidized, and in 2021 Turkey's sovereign wealth fund was still hoping for Chinese partners to start constructing Afşin-Elibistan C. Even in cities where natural gas is available, the government supports poor households with free coal. Electricity from plants which are 40% efficient and burn imported coal never costs less than around 25 USD/MWh to generate: because if the coal costs under 70 USD/tonne it is taxed to bring it up to that price.

=== Politics ===
Without subsidies, new and some existing coal power would be unprofitable, and it is claimed that path dependence or past decisions, political influence, and distorted markets are why they continue. Although the coal industry and the government are said to have a close relationship, the falling cost of wind and solar may increase pressure against maintaining coal subsidies. Hydroelectric plants, especially new ones, are sometimes controversial in local, international and environmental politics. The EU might persuade Turkey to cooperate on climate change by supporting policies that reduce the country's external energy dependency in a sustainable manner.

State energy companies include Eti Mine, Turkish Coal Enterprises, Turkish Hard Coal Enterprises, the Electricity Generation Company, BOTAŞ and TEİAŞ —the electricity trading and transmission company. The government holds a quarter of total installed electricity supply and often offers prices below market levels. Energy deals, such as those with Russia, are said to be politically motivated.

=== Energy transition ===
In 2024 the long-term climate plan said that by 2053, the net zero target year, renewables would supply half of primary energy.The World Bank has estimated the cost and benefits, but has suggested government do far more detailed planning.

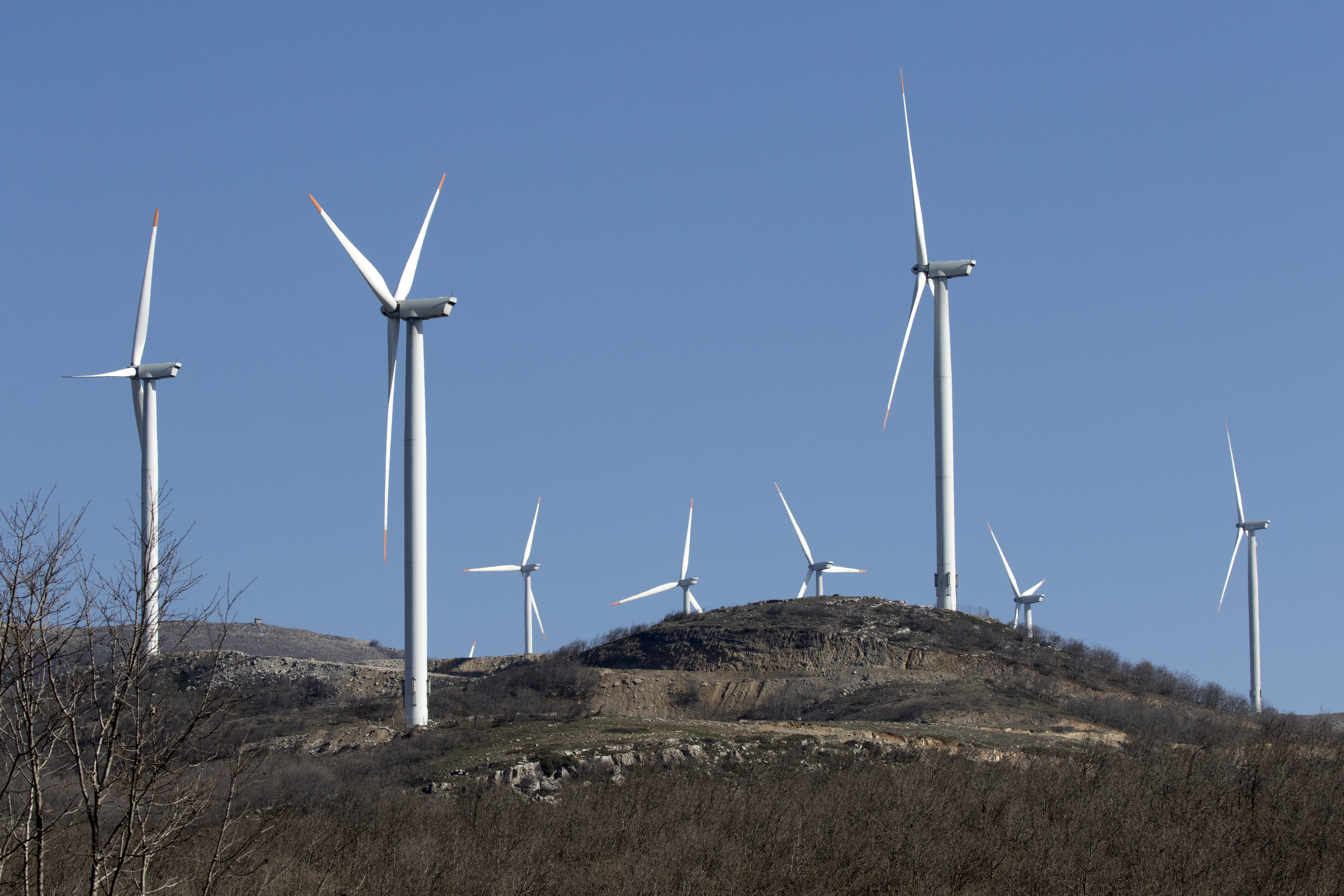
A wind farm in Gaziantep Province

According to the International Renewable Energy Agency and academic study, increasing the share of renewable energy could make the country more energy independent and increase employment especially in Turkey's solar PV and solar heating industries. SHURA Energy Transition Center said in 2018 that a plan for solar power in Turkey beyond 2023 is needed. In an attempt to reduce fossil fuel imports the government supports local production of electric cars and solar cells. Some academics say that funding for renewables such as wind should be decentralized.

For three decades from 1990, carbon intensity remained almost constant around 61 tCO2/TJ (tons of carbon dioxide per terajoule). Nuclear safety regulations and human resources could be improved by cooperation with Euratom ( European Atomic Energy Community). In 2018, a new regulator was set up for nuclear power safety, and $0.15 per kWh of generated electricity will be set aside for waste management.

=== Health and the environment ===
Retrofitting equipment for pollution control, such as flue-gas desulfurization at old lignite-fuelled plants like Soma power station, might not be financially possible, as they use outdated technology. The government collects data on sulfur dioxide (SO_{2}), NO_{x} and particulate air pollution from each large plant, but it is not published.

The energy policy aim of reducing imports (e.g. of gas) conflicts with the climate change policy aim of reducing the emission of greenhouse gases as some local resources (e.g. lignite) emit a lot of CO_{2}. According to Ümit Şahin, who teaches climate change at Sabancı University, Turkey must abandon fossil fuel completely and switch to 100% renewable energy by 2050.

== Economics ==
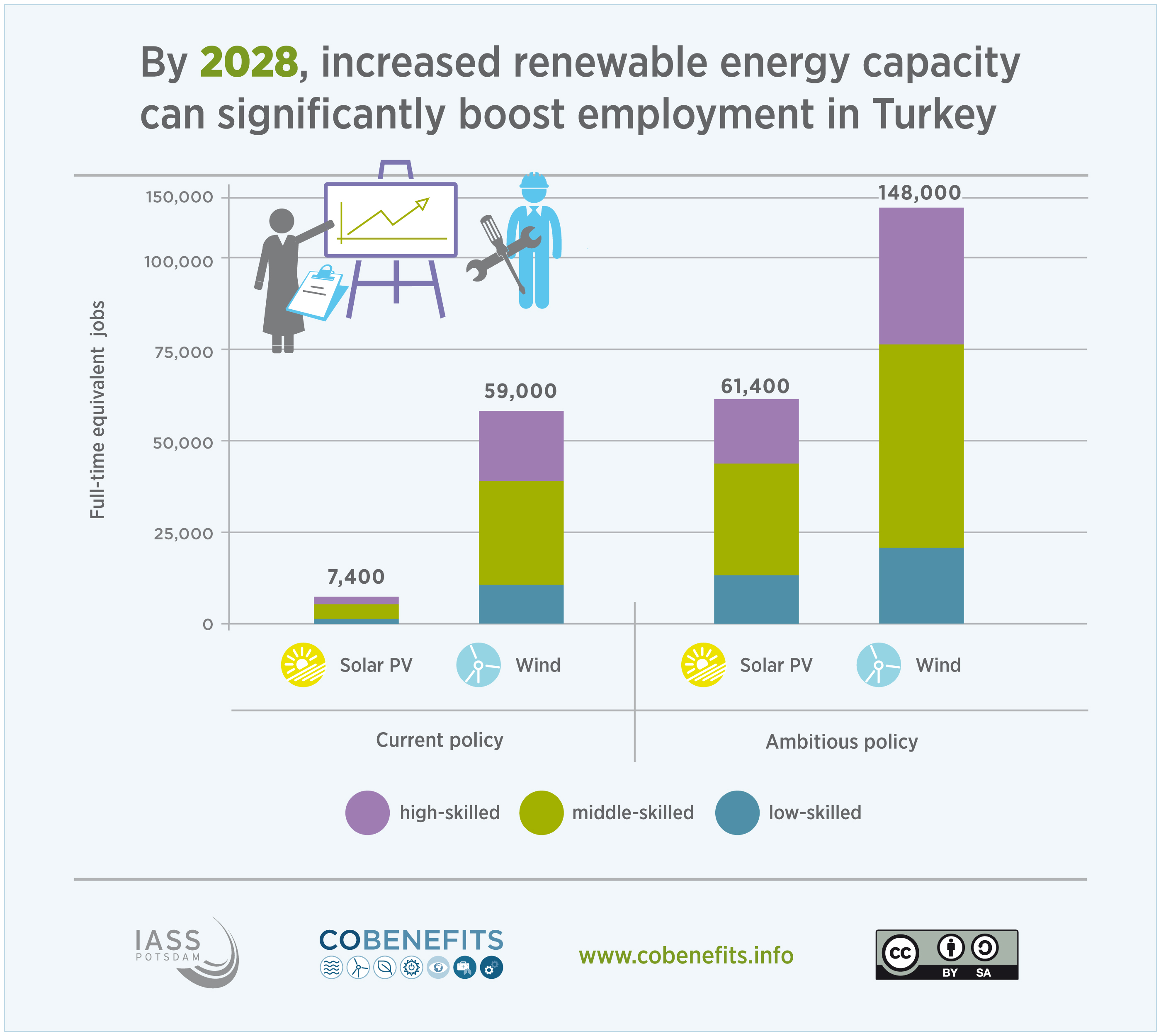
According to some studies, a coal-phase out in favour of renewable energy would increase employment.

Turkey's energy trade deficit was over US$80 billion in 2022, causing a large foreign trade deficit. Europe supports energy efficiency and renewable energy via the €1 billion Mid-size Sustainable Energy Financing Facility (MidSEFF) to finance investments in these areas. Energy subsidies amounted to 200 billion lira in 2021. Up to 150 kWh per month of free electricity is provided to two million poor families.

Fatih Birol, the head of the International Energy Agency said in 2019 that, because of its falling price, the focus should be on maximizing onshore wind power in Turkey. The economics of coal power has been modelled by Carbon Tracker. They estimate that for new plants both wind and solar is already cheaper than coal power. They forecast that existing coal plants will be more expensive than new solar by 2023 and new wind by 2027.

Most energy deals in 2019 were for renewables, and over half the investment in these was from outside the country. The external costs of fossil fuel consumption in 2018 has been estimated as 1.5% of GDP. The government sets the price of residential gas and electricity, and as of 2018, for residential consumers, "high cost is the most important problem of Turkey's energy system".

In 2022, the energy import bill was 97 billion USD. Keeping consumer prices low is a political priority. In 2024, Shura estimated the costs of moving to clean energy at about half the benefits, which are mostly due to reduced air pollution and carbon emissions.

== Energy sources ==
=== Coal ===
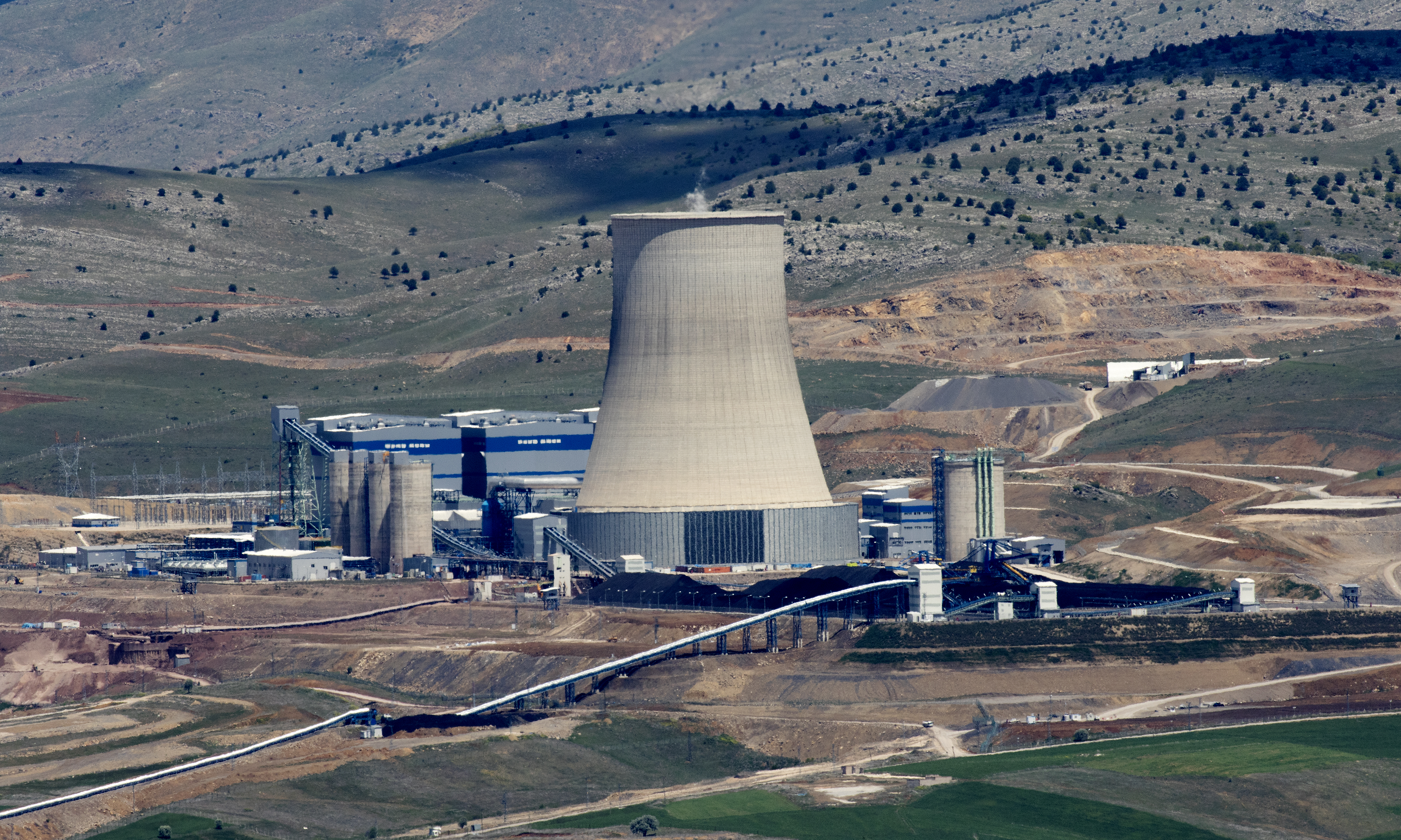
Tufanbeyli coal-fired power station, Adana

Coal supplies over a quarter of Turkey's primary energy. Every year, thousands of people die prematurely from coal-related causes, the most common of which is local air pollution.

Most coal mined in Turkey is lignite (brown coal), which is more polluting than other types of coal. Turkey's energy policy encourages mining lignite for coal-fired power stations to reduce gas imports; and coal supplies over 40% of domestic energy production. Mining peaked in 2018, at over 100 million tonnes, and declined considerably in 2019. In contrast to local lignite production, Turkey imports almost all of the bituminous coal it uses. The largest coalfield in Turkey is Elbistan.

=== Oil and gas ===
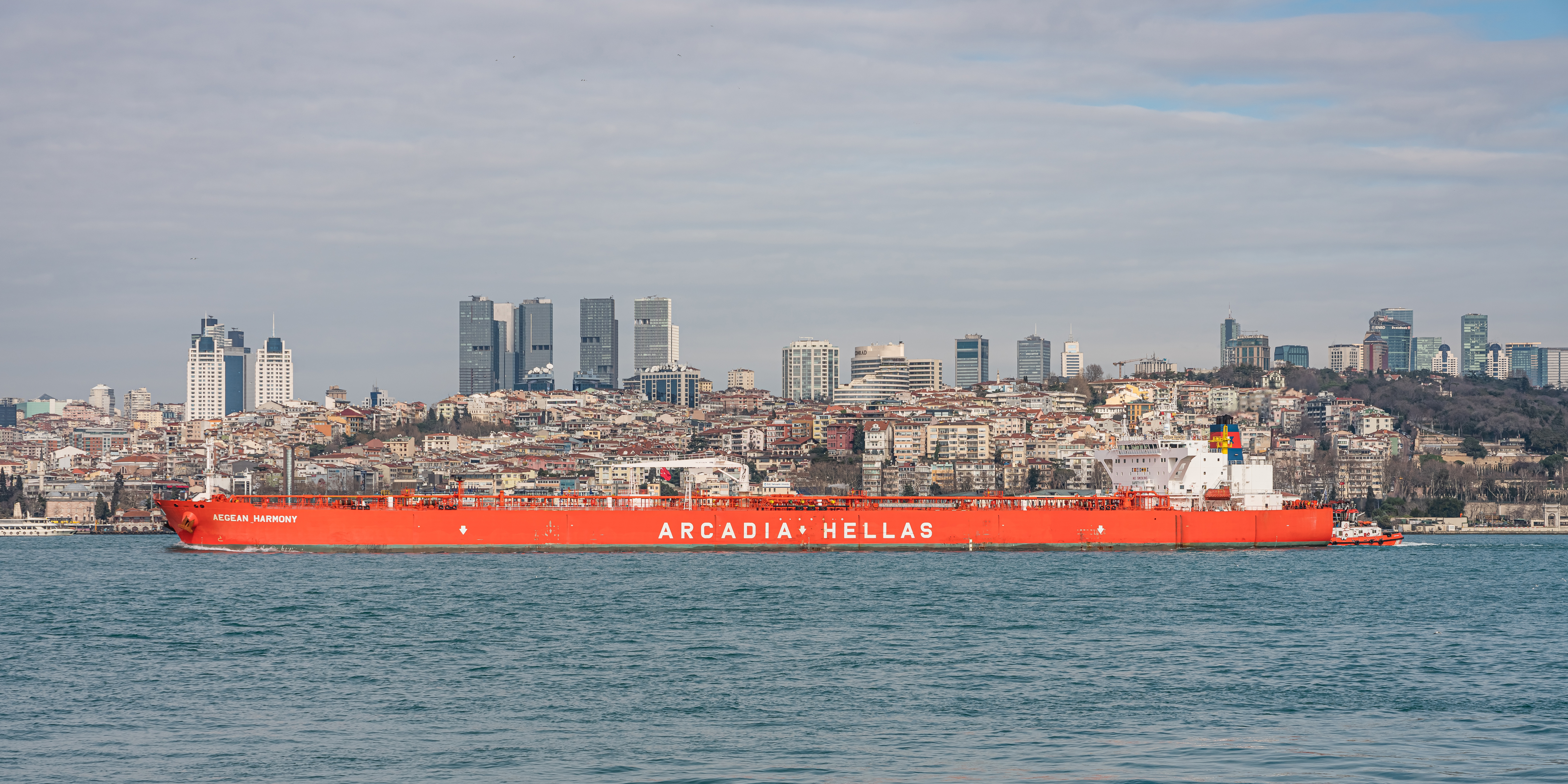
Tankers, like this one in the Bosporus, are one way to export oil from Central Asia.

Oil supplies over a quarter of Turkey's energy. Because the country produces little oil, it is almost completely dependent on imports. Most diesel is also imported. Over half of oil is burnt in the country's road vehicles. Turkey is one of the world's largest users of liquefied petroleum gas, mainly as autogas.

Because Turkey produces only 15% of the crude oil it consumes, the country's total imports are worth more than its exports, which is a problem for its economy. After the 2022 Russian invasion of Ukraine, several European countries stopped buying Russian oil, but Turkey's relations with Russia are such that it supplies most oil imports.

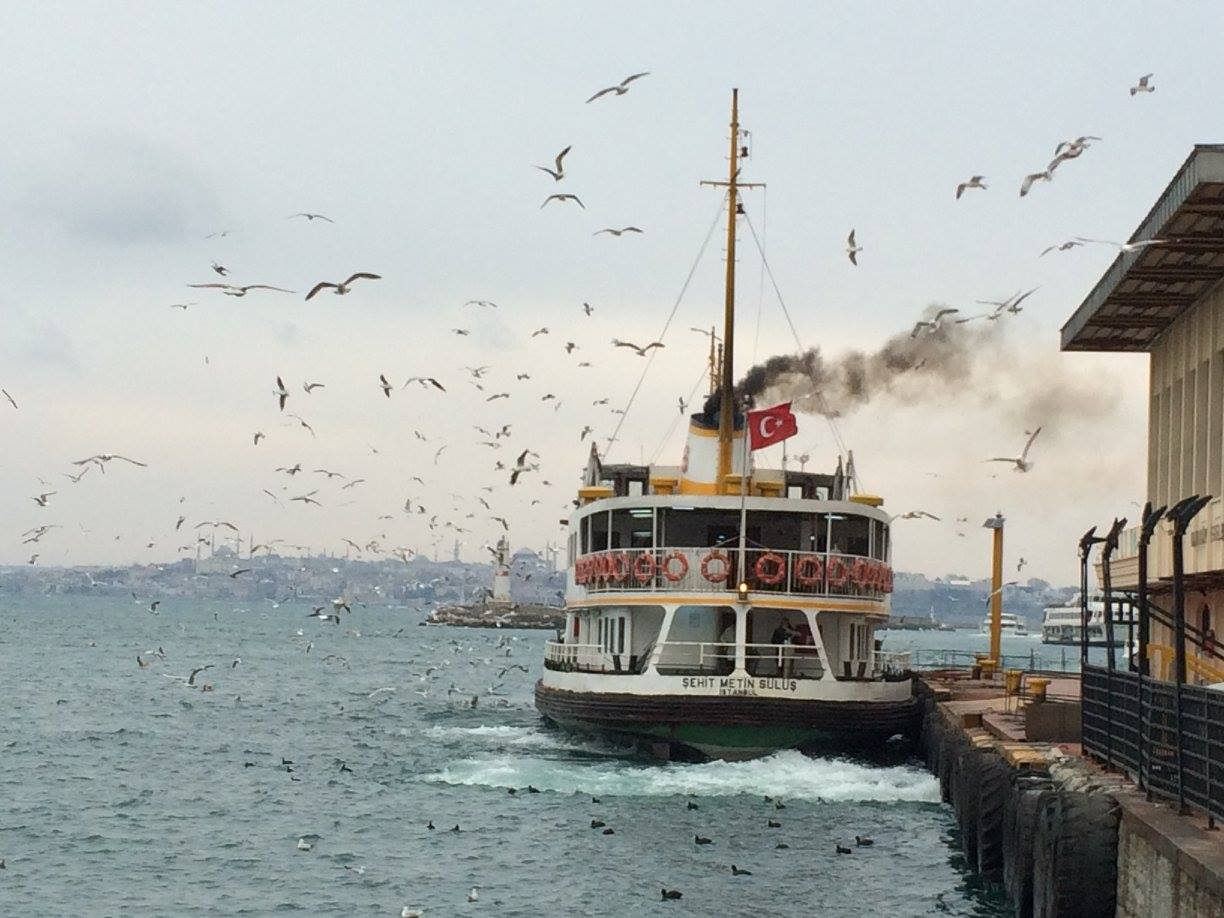
Some ships burn heavy fuel oil near cities.

Exhaust from diesel-fuelled lorries pollutes roads with nitrogen dioxide, carbon monoxide and soot.

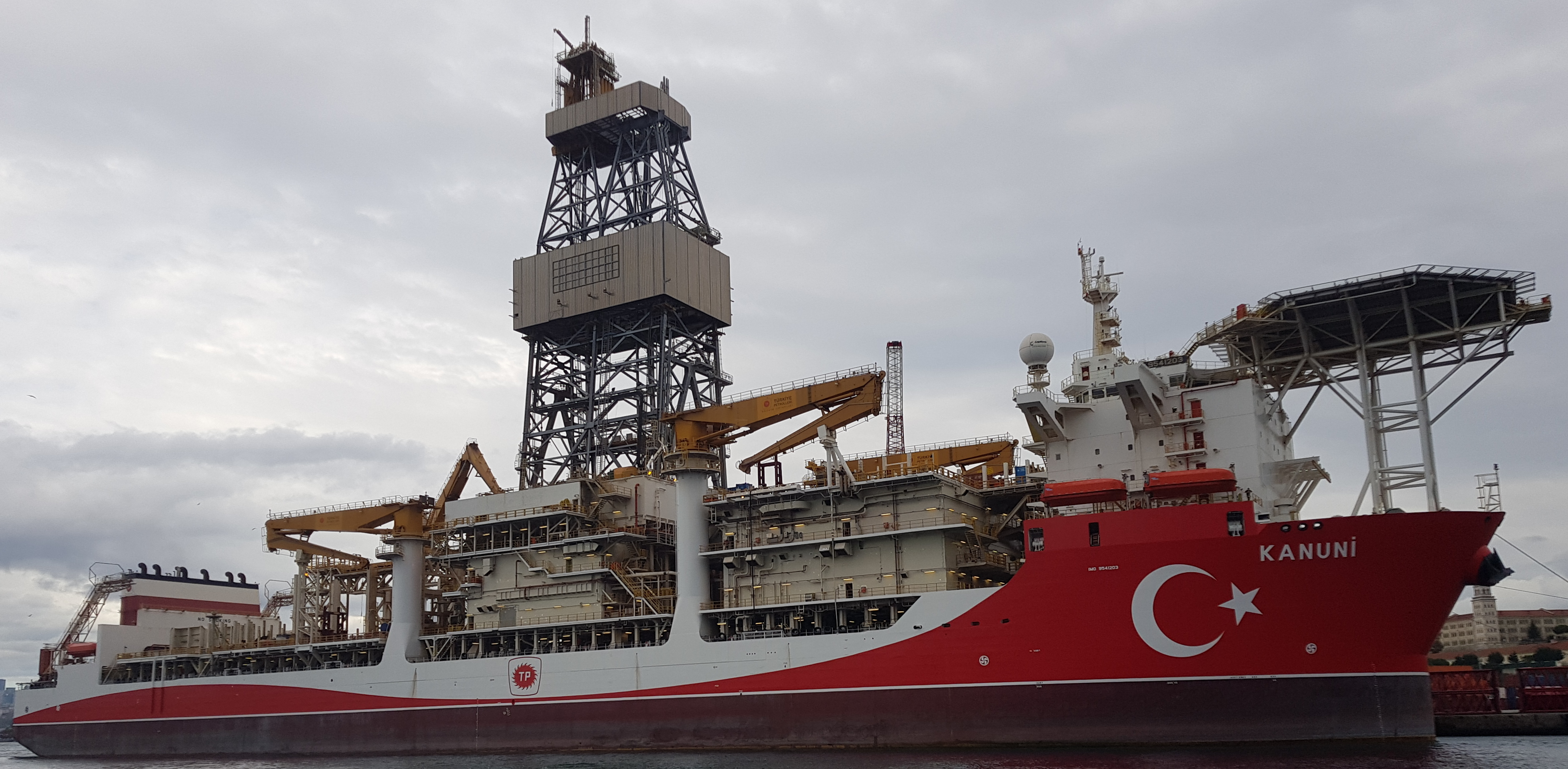
The Kanuni has drilled in the Black Sea.

Natural gas supplies over a quarter of Turkey's energy. The country consumes 50 to 60 billion cubic metres of natural gas each year, nearly all of which is imported. A large gas field in the Black Sea started production in 2023.

After the 2022 Russian invasion of Ukraine several European countries stopped buying Russian oil or gas, but Turkey's relations with Russia are good enough that it continues to buy both. Turkey receives much gas from Russia, which is cheaper than LNG. Households buy the most gas, followed by industry and power stations. Over 80% of the population has access to gas, and it supplies half the country's heating requirements. As the state-owned oil and gas wholesaler BOTAŞ has 80% of the gas market, the government can and does subsidize residential and industrial gas consumers. All industrial and commercial customers, and households using more than a certain amount of gas, can switch suppliers.

=== Nuclear ===
Nuclear power stations in Turkey (view)
Under construction
Proposed

There is no nuclear power in Turkey yet, but Akkuyu Nuclear Power Plant is being built and is expected to start selling power in 2023. The nuclear power debate has a long history, with the 2018 construction start in Mersin Province being the sixth major attempt to build a nuclear power plant since 1960.

Plans for a nuclear plant in Sinop and another at İğneada have stalled.

=== Waste ===
In 2021, the Metropolitan Municipality of Istanbul opened the country's first waste-to-energy plant. The Istanbul Waste Power Plant is capable of generating 175 MW⋅h electrical and 175 MW⋅h thermal energy by 3,000 tons waste incineration daily.

=== Renewable energy ===
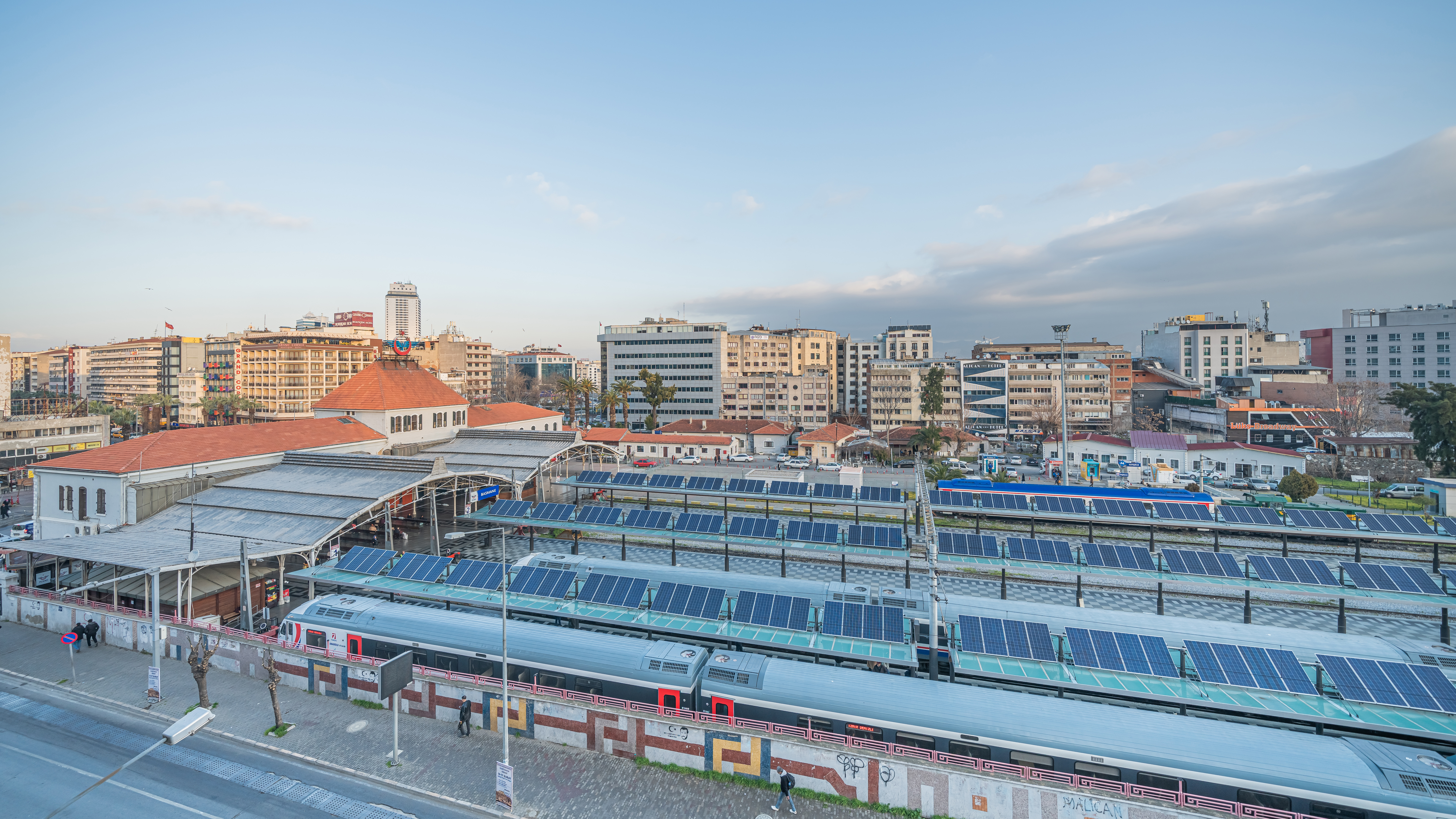
Solar panels on an İzmir train station roof: the country has the potential to get a large part of its energy from the sun.

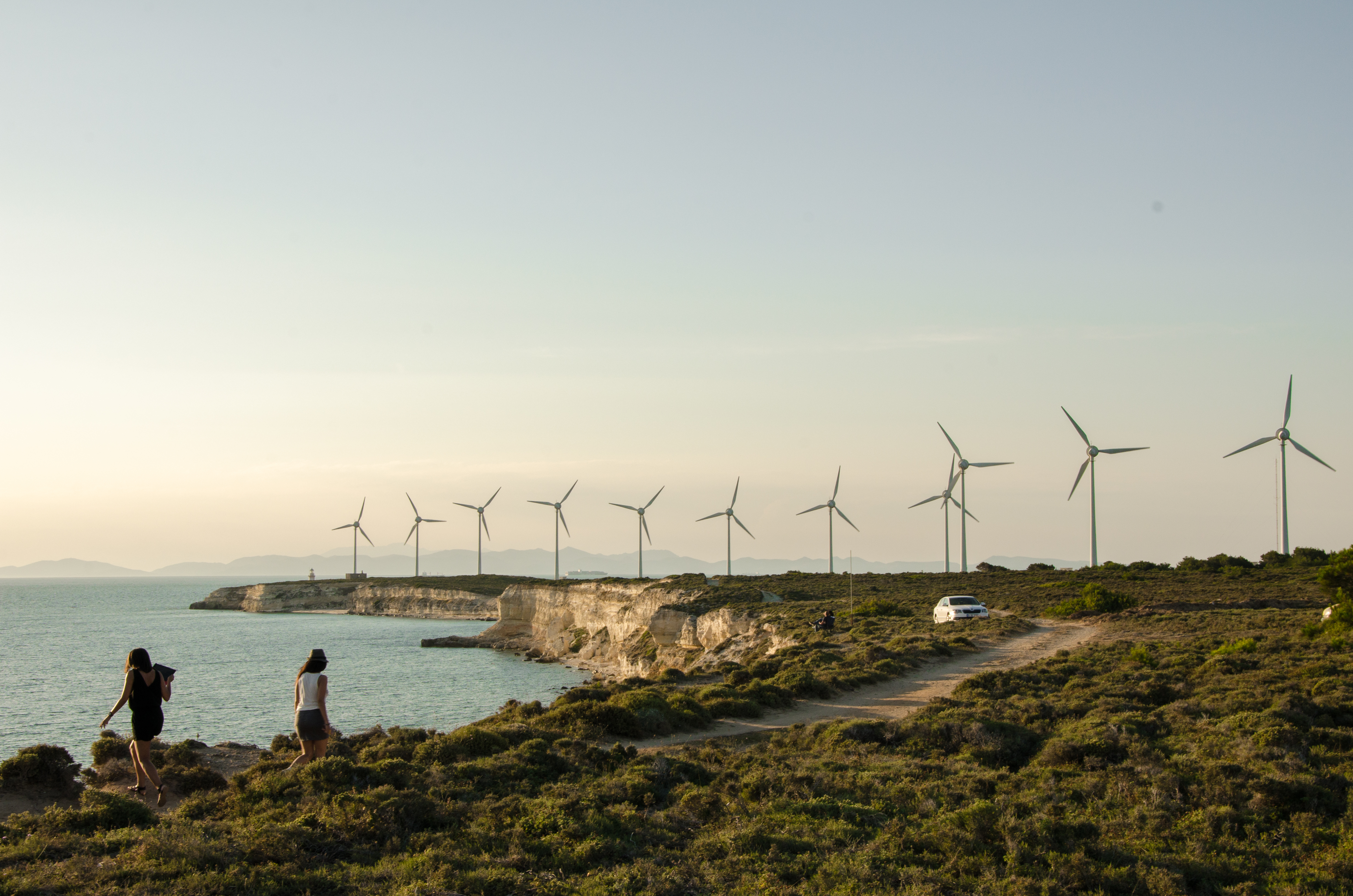
Wind turbines on the island of Bozcaada in the far west

In 2022 over 40% of renewable energy was geothermal.

Although there are plenty of renewable resources for energy in Turkey, for electricity only hydropower has been developed near or to the full, supplying an average of about 20% of Turkey's national electricity supply, with other renewables supplying 12%. However, due to drought in Turkey, hydro has supplied less electricity than usual in recent years, compared to around a third in a wet year. Turkey has invested less in solar and wind power than similar Mediterranean countries. Turkey is a net exporter of wind power equipment, but a net importer of solar power equipment.

By greatly increasing its production of solar power in the south and wind power in the west, the country's entire energy demand could be met from renewable sources by 2050. A 2025 meta-analysis found significant gaps between Turkey's renewable energy potential and current utilisation. Solar energy is the most underutilised resource, with economic potential of 305 TWh/year—nearly matching Turkey's 2024 electricity demand of 340.8 TWh—yet only 24.9 TWh is currently generated. Wind potential estimates range from 48 to 88 GW, while installed capacity stands at 12.6 GW. Hydropower, the most developed renewable source, faces climate-related risks, with reservoir levels in key basins declining significantly since 2010, including Gediz (−45.5%) and Konya (−43.2%). Geothermal utilisation reaches 38% of estimated potential.

Renewable energy potential versus utilisation (2024)
Resource	Economic potential	Current output	Utilisation
Solar	305 TWh/year	24.9 TWh	~8%
Hydropower	125–140 TWh/year	73.1 TWh	~55%
Wind	48–88 GW	12.6 GW	~15–27%
Geothermal	4.5 GW	1.73 GW	~38%
Biomass	45–291 TWh/year	9.8 TWh	~3–22%

== Consumption ==
Consumption of energy in Turkey is around the world average of about seventy gigajoules (GJ) per person per year. In total Turkey uses about six billion GJ of primary energy per year— over 80% from fossil fuels. In 2022 almost a third of energy was used by industry, and a similar share by residential and services, with transport using about a quarter. Most energy used in buildings is for heating. Heating is the main use for geothermal power in Turkey. Gas consumption is concentrated in the north-west due to the concentration of industry, and the population in Istanbul. The government introduced a green electricity tariff in 2021.

== Electricity ==
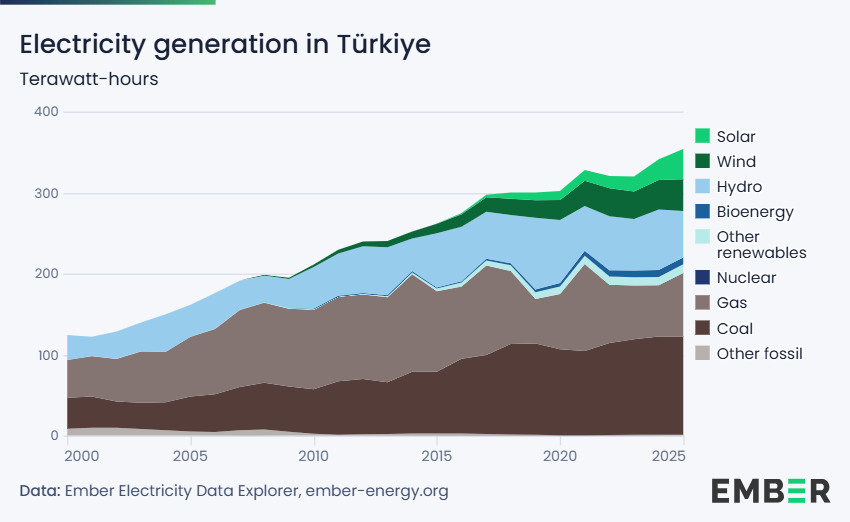
Electricity generation in Turkey by source in terawatt-hours

Turkey uses more electricity per person than the global average, but less than the European average, with demand peaking in summer due to air conditioning. Most electricity is generated from coal, gas and hydropower, with hydroelectricity from the east transmitted to big cities in the west. Electricity prices are state-controlled, but wholesale prices are heavily influenced by the cost of imported gas.

Each year, over 300 terawatt-hours (TWh) of electricity is used, which is almost a quarter of the total energy used in Turkey. On average, about four hundred grams of carbon dioxide is emitted per kilowatt-hour of electricity generated (400 gCO_{2}/kWh); this carbon intensity is slightly less than the global average. As there is 100 GW of generating capacity, far more electricity could be produced. Although only a tiny proportion is exported; consumption is forecast to increase, and there are plans for more exports during the 2020s.

Turkey's coal-fired power stations are the largest source of the country's greenhouse-gas emissions. Many brown coal power stations are subsidized, which increases air pollution. Imports of gas, mostly for Turkey's power stations, are one of the main expenses for the country. In winter, electricity generation is vulnerable to reductions in the gas supply from other countries. Solar and wind power are now the cheapest generators of electricity, and more of both are being built. If enough solar and wind power is built, the country's hydroelectric plants should be enough to cover windless cloudy weeks. Renewables generate a third of the country's electricity, and academics have suggested that the target of 32% renewable energy by 2030 be increased to 50%, and that coal power should be phased out by the mid-2030s. Increased use of electric vehicles is expected to increase electricity demand. Modernizing the grid is important for the country’s energy security.

== History ==
Four thousand years ago most of what is now Turkey was forested. Deforestation occurred during both prehistoric and historic times, including the Roman and Ottoman periods. The forests were cut down by people, partly to burn wood for heating.

Coal has been burnt since late Ottoman times.

During the late 20th and early 21st centuries the country was very exposed to oil and gas price volatility. Around the turn of the century many gas-fired power plants were built, and BOTAŞ extended the national gas pipeline network to most of the urban population. As Turkey had almost no natural gas of its own this increased import dependency, particularly on Russian gas. Therefore, many more regasification plants and gas storage (such as the gas storage at Lake Tuz) were built in the early 21st century, thus ensuring a much longer buffer should the main international import pipelines be cut for any reason. However growth in Turkish electricity demand has often been overestimated. Although much energy infrastructure was privatised in the late 20th and early 21st centuries, energy is still highly state controlled.

== Projections ==
In 2021 the International Energy Agency recommended Turkey includes further electrification in integrated scenario planning.

Mckinsey suggested in 2023 that Turkey may become part of a bloc along with China and India buying fuel from Russia.

== See also ==
- Environmental issues in Turkey
- Historical Tarsus hydroelectric power plant
- Global Energy Monitor
