= Ministry of Energy and Natural Resources =

Government ministry of the Republic of Turkey

- Enerji ve Tabii Kaynaklar Bakanlığı
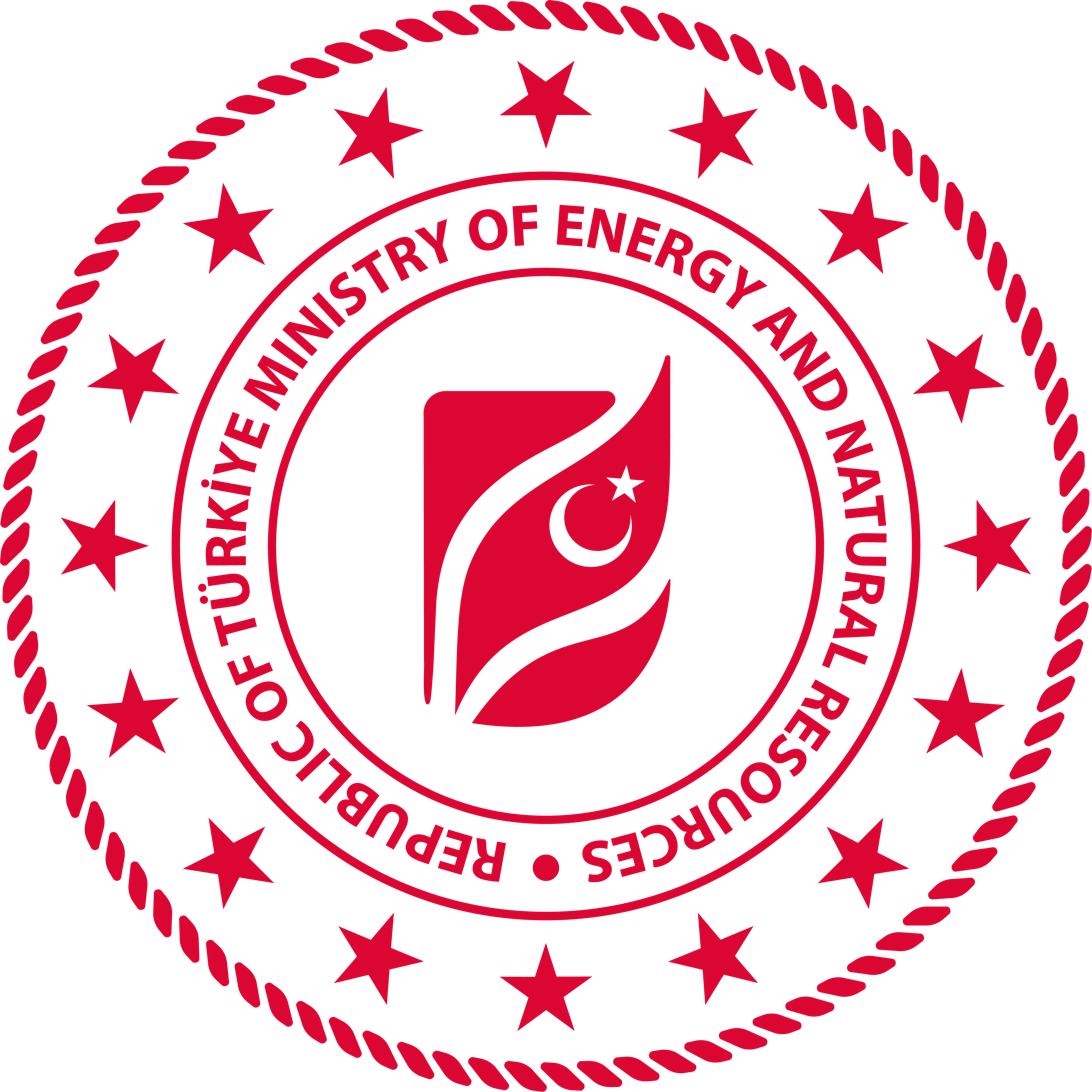

Agency overview
- Formed: 1963; 63 years ago
- Jurisdiction: Government of Turkey
- Headquarters: Ankara
- Minister responsible: Alparslan Bayraktar
- Deputy Ministers responsible: Abdullah Tancan; Ahmet Berat Çonkar; Nevzat Şatıroğlu; Zafer Demircan
- Website: enerji.gov.tr/homepage

The Ministry of Energy and Natural Resources (Turkish: Enerji ve Tabii Kaynaklar Bakanlığı) is the government ministry of Republic of Turkey responsible for natural resources and energy in Turkey. The ministry is headed by Alparslan Bayraktar. Despite the ministry being represented on the Climate Change and Air Management Coordination Board, the European Commission has criticised the lack of co-ordination between policy on climate change in Turkey and the energy policy of Turkey. The net zero by 2053 target was reportedly set without consulting the ministry, and as of 2023 the ministry has not published a plan to meet the target.

== Sources ==
  - 2019-2023 Strateji̇k Plani (PDF) (Report) (in Turkish). Ministry of Energy and Natural Resources (Turkey). May 2020.
  - MENR (September 2019). Investor's Guide for Electricity sector in Turkey (Report).
  - MENR (September 2019). Investor's Guide for Mining sector in Turkey (Report).
  - MENR: Energy Administration. "National Energy Balance tables annually since 1972" (in Turkish).
