= Energy Market Regulatory Authority =

Turkish government agency

Agency overview
- Website: epdk.gov.tr

The Energy Market Regulatory Authority (EMRA; Türkiye Cumhuriyeti Enerji Piyasası Düzenleme Kurumu) is the market regulator for energy in Turkey.

EMRA was established in 2001 by Law No. 4628 to regulate electricity markets in Turkey. Subsequently, it was assigned the task of regulating the natural gas, petroleum and LPG markets by various laws. As of January 1, 2005, it has the authority to regulate and control all kinds of activities in this field, with the exception of fuel prices, which have been deregulated for a certain period of time.

== Establishment ==
The Energy Market Regulatory Authority (EMRA) does not have a separate establishment law but was established pursuant to Article 4 of the Electricity Market Law No. 4628 adopted on 20 February 2001. EMRA is an independent supreme board. Although it is a public institution, it is not under the tutelage of the government. By establishing such a structure, it is aimed to manage the energy markets by an impartial authority in accordance with economic rules. The headquarters of the Authority is located in its own building on Eskişehir Road in Ankara. The Ministry with which the Authority is associated is the Ministry of Energy and Natural Resources of the Republic of Turkey. The Authority has established a liaison office in Istanbul to ensure customer relations in the distribution regions.

Establishing a functioning market economy in the energy industries, also referred to as grid industries, presents unique challenges. EMRA therefore fulfills a fully specialized role. EMRA was initially established to regulate the electricity market, but through legislative amendments, it has been expanded to regulate natural gas, petrol.
