= John 'Oke Afareha =

Nigerian Roman Catholic prelate (1947–2026)

The Most Reverend John 'Oke Afareha
- Bishop of Warri
- Archdiocese: Benin City
- Diocese: Warri
- Installed: 29 March 2010
- Term ended: 18 April 2022
- Predecessor: Richard Anthony Burke
- Successor: Anthony Ewherido
- Previous posts: Auxiliary Bishop of Warri and Titular Bishop of Mina (1997–2010)

Orders
- Ordination: 30 December 1973
- Consecration: 14 May 1997 by Jozef Tomko

Personal details
- Born: 10 March 1947 Oleh, Colony and Protectorate of Nigeria
- Died: 18 January 2026 (aged 78)

John Okeoghene Afareha (10 March 1947 – 18 January 2026) was a Nigerian Roman Catholic prelate who served as the bishop of the Diocese of Warri from 2010 to 2022.

== Life and career ==
Afareha was born on 10 March 1947 to Rebecca and Edward Afareha from Oleh, now in Isoko South, Delta State, Nigeria. His father died when he was young, hence he was trained with his sister Theresa Maris Afareha by their stepmother, Angelina Afareha.

He served as curate to the Very Rev Monsignor Anthony Topken sometime in the early 1990s at Ss. Peter and Paul Catholic Church, Ughelli.

In 1997, he was appointed auxiliary bishop of Warri diocese by Pope John Paul II and was consecrated bishop by Cardinal Jozef Tomko, Prefect of Sacred Congregation for the Evangelisation of People, on 14 May 1997. On 29 March 2010, Afareha was appointed Bishop of Warri, where he served until 18 April 2022, when Pope Francis accepted his resignation as the diocesan bishop.

Afareha died on 18 January 2026 at the age of 78.

Catholic Church titles
Preceded by Richard Anthony Burke	Bishop of Warri; 2010–2022	Succeeded by Anthony Ewherido
Preceded by Carlos Arthur Sevilla	Titular Bishop of Mina; 1997–2010	Succeeded by Wilfried Theising
Preceded by —	Auxiliary Bishop of Warri; 1997–2010	Succeeded by —
