= Augustine Obiora Akubeze =

Nigerian Roman Catholic archbishop (1956–2026)

The Most Reverend Augustine Obiora Akubeze
- Archbishop of Benin City
- Church: Roman Catholic Church
- Archdiocese: Benin City
- See: Benin City
- Appointed: 18 March 2011
- Installed: 28 April 2011
- Term ended: 9 July 2026
- Predecessor: Richard Anthony Burke
- Successor: Vacant
- Other post: Apostolic Administrator of Warri (2022–2023)
- Previous posts: Bishop of Uromi (2005–11); Vice-President of the Nigerian Episcopal Conference (2012–18); President of Catholic Bishops Conference of Nigeria (2018–2022)

Orders
- Ordination: 3 October 1987
- Consecration: 25 February 2006 by Anthony Olubunmi Okogie, Patrick Ebosele Ekpu and Renzo Fratini

Personal details
- Born: Augustine Obiora Akubeze; 25 August 1956 Kaduna, Northern Region, Federation of Nigeria
- Died: 9 July 2026 (aged 69)

Styles of Augustine Obiora Akubeze
- Reference style: His Excellency
- Spoken style: Your Excellency
- Religious style: Archbishop

Augustine Obiora Akubeze (25 August 1956 – 9 July 2026) was a Nigerian prelate of the Catholic Church who served as archbishop of the Roman Catholic Archdiocese of Benin City from 2011 to 2026.

On 18 March 2011, Vatican Information Service reported that Pope Benedict XVI had appointed Bishop Augustine Obiora Akubeze of the Roman Catholic Diocese of Uromi, Nigeria, as metropolitan archbishop of the Roman Catholic Archdiocese of Benin City, Nigeria, effective on 28 March 2011. He was born in Kaduna, Nigeria in 1956; he was ordained a priest in 1987 and consecrated a bishop in 2006.

Akubeze died on 9 July 2026, at the age of 69.

== Sources ==
- Augustine Obiora Akubeze
- Immaculate Conception College in Benin City welcomes new archbishop
- Catholic News Service of Nigeria

Catholic Church titles
Preceded by Richard Anthony Burke	Archbishop of Benin City; 2011–2026	Succeeded by Vacant
Preceded by Position established	Bishop of Uromi; 2005–2011	Succeeded by Donatus Aihmiosion Ogun
