= Donatus Aihmiosion Ogun =

Nigerian Catholic prelate

Donatus Aihmiosion Ogun OSA
- Bishop of Uromi
- Church: Catholic Church
- Diocese: Diocese of Uromi
- Appointed: 6 November 2014
- Predecessor: Augustine Obiora Akubeze

Orders
- Ordination: 31 July 1993
- Consecration: 31 January 2015 by Augustine Obiora Akubeze

Personal details
- Born: 12 October 1966 (age 59) Sapele, Mid-Western Region, Nigeria

Donatus Aihmiosion Ogun (born 12 October 1966) is a Nigerian Catholic prelate who has served as the bishop of the Diocese of Uromi since 6 November 2014.

== Biography ==
Ogun was born on 12 October 1966 in Sapele, Delta State, Nigeria. Joining the Order of Saint Augustine in Nigeria, he made his temporary profession on 28 August 1989 and his perpetual profession on 28 August 1992. He was ordained priest on 13 July 1993.

Ogun was appointed by Pope Francis on 6 November 2014 as the bishop of Uromi, a suffragan diocese under the Archdiocese of Benin City, which his predecessor Augustine Obiora Akubeze became the Archbishop as well as consecrated him on 31 January 2015 with co-consecrators: John Oke Afareha, Bishop of Warri and Johnson Namanzah Niyiring, Bishop of Kano.
