= St. Paul Cathedral (Yakima, Washington) =

St. Paul's Cathedral
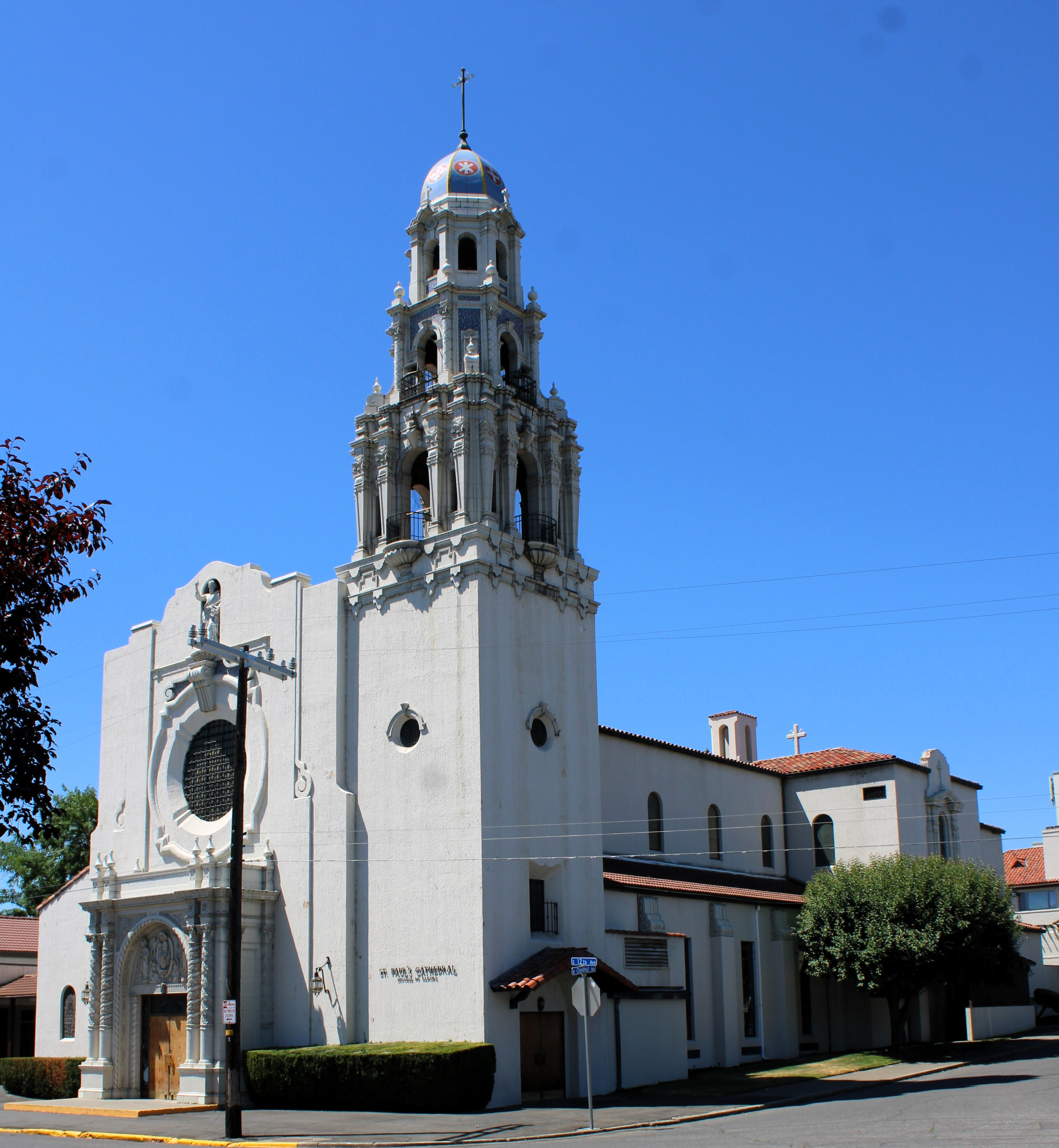

- Location in Washington St. Paul's Cathedral (the United States)
- 46°35′46″N 120°31′32″W
- Location: 15 S. 12th Ave. Yakima, Washington
- Country: United States
- Denomination: Catholic Church
- Sui iuris church: Latin Church
- Website: www.stpaulyakima.org

History
- Status: Cathedral/Parish
- Founded: 1914
- Founder: Rev. Robert Armstrong

Architecture
- Architect: John Maonly
- Style: Spanish Colonial Revival
- Years built: 1926-1927

Specifications
- Capacity: 800

Administration
- Diocese: Yakima

Clergy
- Bishop: Most Rev. Joseph J. Tyson
- Rector: Msgr. John A. Ecker

St. Paul's Cathedral, Yakima, Washington, United States, is a Catholic cathedral and a parish church in the Diocese of Yakima.

== History ==
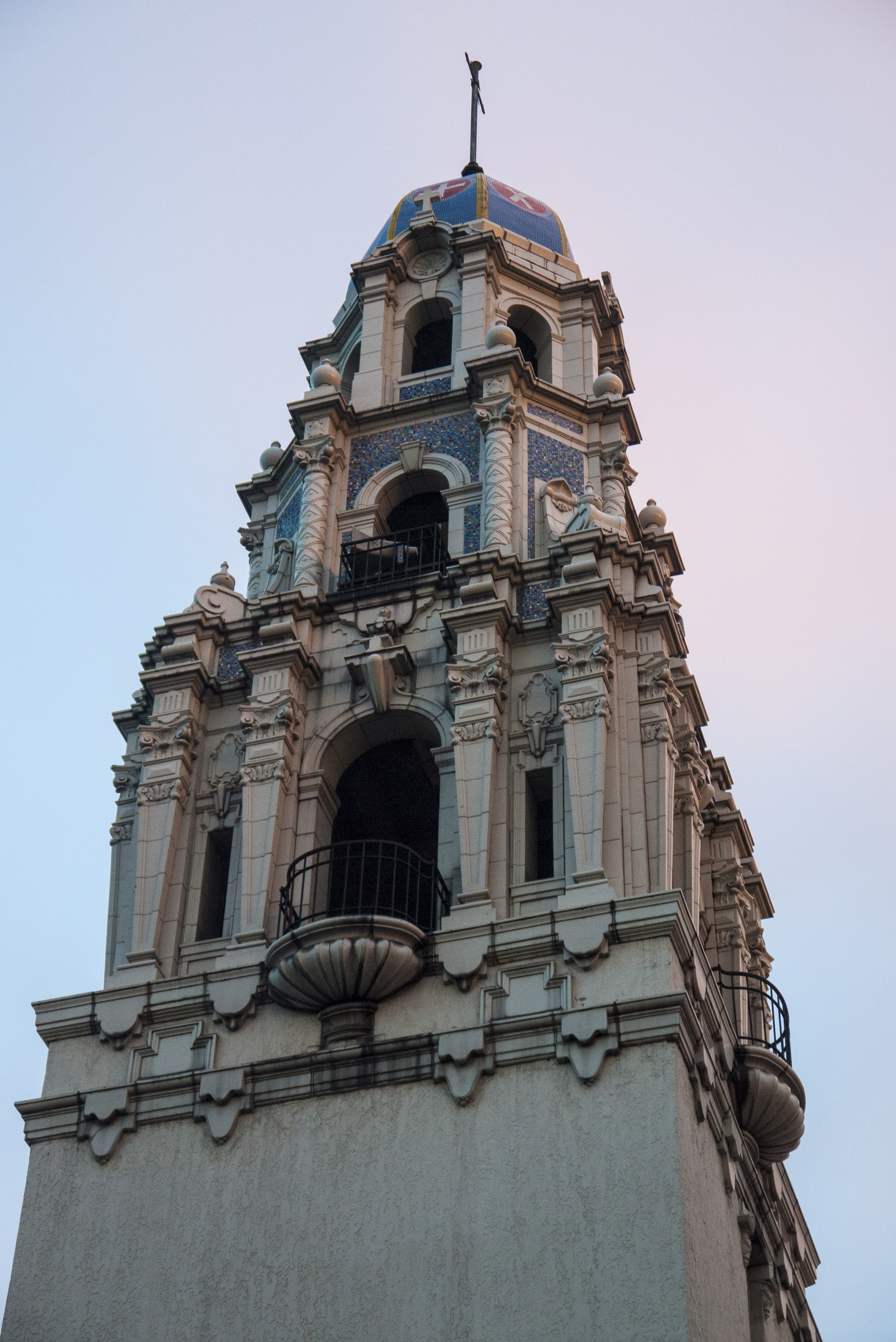
Cathedral tower

Four Missionary Oblates of Mary Immaculate were the first Catholic priests to visit the Yakima River Valley. Fathers Charles Pandosy, Casimir Chirouse, George Blancehett and Father Richard established St. Joseph Mission in 1847. They came at the invitation of Chief Owhi of the Yakima tribe.

The first Mass for St. Paul's parish was celebrated on March 19, 1914, which was Easter Sunday, in the chapel of St Elizabeth Hospital in Yakima. Two hundred people attended the liturgy celebrated by the parish's first pastor, the Rev. Robert Armstrong. Armstrong bought five acres of land later that same year from D.E. Lesh for the parish. It was bounded by Chestnut and Walnut Streets, and 14th and 12th Avenues. Groundbreaking for a combination school and church building was held in July. The current rectory, designed by the Beezer Brothers, was added behind the church in 1920.

Excavation for the present church was begun on February 8, 1926. The architect for the Spanish Colonial Revival style church was John Maonly. Armstrong celebrated the first Mass in the church once again on Easter Sunday, April 18, 1927.

Pope Pius XII created the Diocese of Yakima on July 18, 1951, from the Diocese of Seattle, and St. Paul's was named the diocesan cathedral. The Rev. Joseph Dougherty of Seattle was named first bishop of the diocese.

The cathedral was expanded from 1954 to 1955. A terrazzo floor and new oak pews were installed. The seating capacity of the cathedral was increased to 800 at this time. New confessionals, chapel, baptistery and enlarged sacristy were also added.

== Architecture ==
St. Paul's Cathedral is a cross-shaped building that is capped with a red tile roof. The main facade was dominated by a 125-foot (38 m) tower topped. It is capped with a glazed tile dome and a bronze cross. On the opposite side of the building is a rounded apse where the altar is located.

== See also ==
- List of Catholic cathedrals in the United States
- List of cathedrals in the United States
- Saint Paul Cathedral School (Yakima, Washington)
