= Yarpuz =

- Village
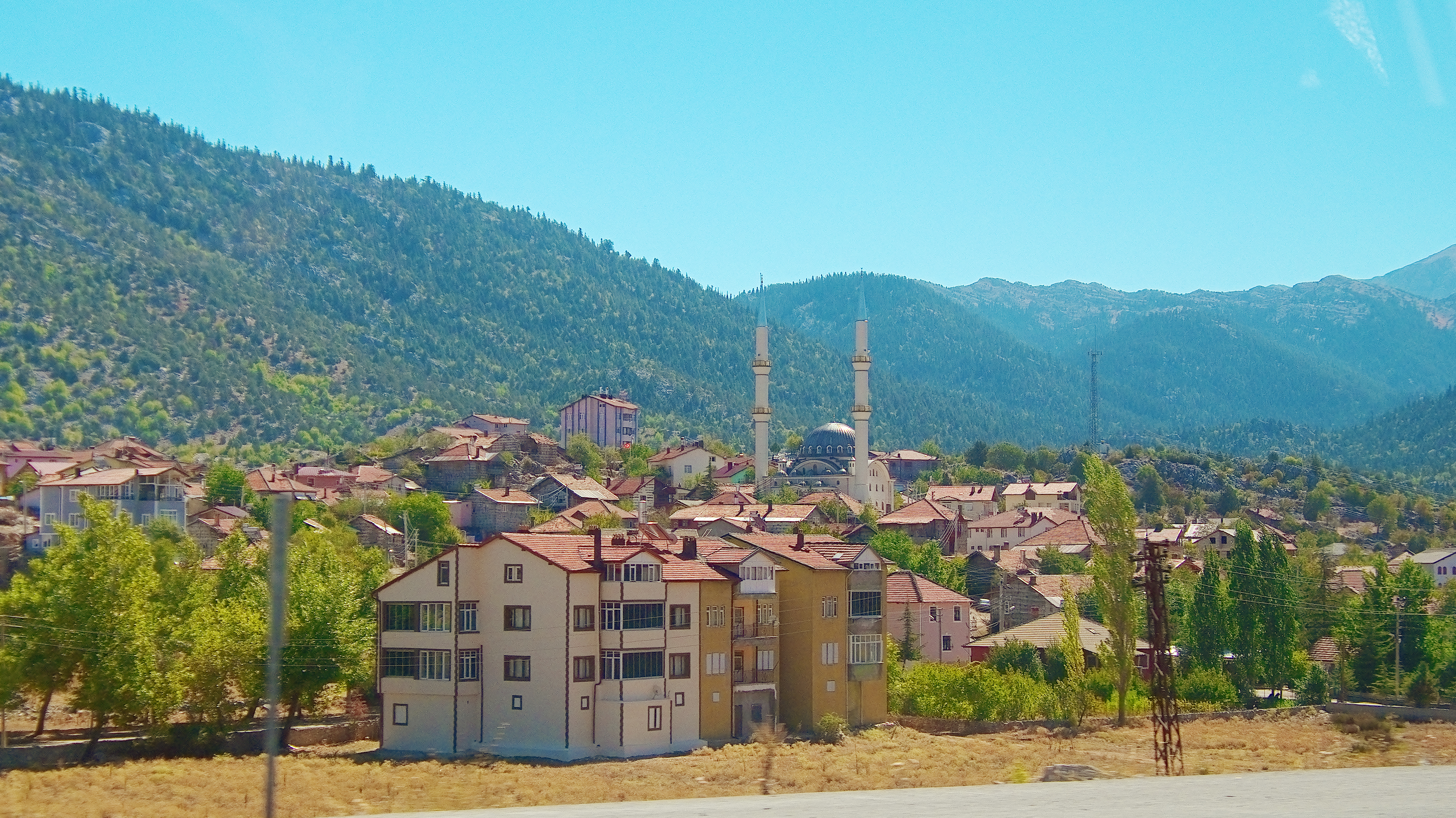

- Location within Turkey
- Coordinates: 37°03′N 36°26′E
- Country: Turkey
- Province: Osmaniye
- District: Osmaniye
- Elevation: 960 m (3,150 ft)
- Population (2022): 794
- Time zone: UTC+3 (TRT)
- Postal code: 80000
- Area code: 0328

Yarpuz is a village in the Osmaniye District in Osmaniye Province, Turkey. Its population is 794 (2022). It is situated in Nur Mountains and along Yarpuz creek which is actually a tributary of Ceyhan River. The distance to Osmaniye is about 20 kilometres (12 mi). Although presently only a village, Yarpuz was the capital of Cebelibereket sanjak during the last years of the Ottoman Empire.
