= Vivian Uchechi Ogu =

Nigerian martyred Catholic (1995–2009)

Servant of God Vivian Uchechi Ogu
- Born: 1 April 1995; Benin City, Nigeria
- Died: 15 November 2009 (aged 14); Benin City, Nigeria
- Cause of death: Murder by gunshot

Vivian Uchechi Ogu (1 April 1995 – 15 November 2009) was a Nigerian 14-year-old lay person who was martyred for defending her chastity. She was declared Servant of God on 7 October 2023 at Holy Cross Cathedral by Archbishop Augustine Obiora Akubeze.

== Early life ==
Ogu was born in Benin City on 1 April 1995 to Peter Ogu and his wife in Imo State, Nigeria. She was the second out of four children. She attended the Air Force Nursery and Primary School. She was a parishioner of St. Paul's Catholic Church, Airport Road, Benin City. She was a member of the Catholic Charismatic Renewal, the choir mistress of the children's choir, and the president of the Holy Childhood Association in the parish.

== Martyrdom ==
On 15 November 2009, while at home that evening, armed robbers came to rob her family and afterward took her and her sister to a nearby bush and attempted to rape her. She refused and opted to be shot instead. She also continually instructed her sister to do the same, distracting the robbers, and allowing her sister to escape. Her body was found the following day.

== Honors ==
The Government council of Ikpoba Okha officially named the street on which she was killed "Vivian Ogu". On 17 September 2019, the Edo State government launched the Vivian Ogu Sexual Assault Referral Centre. The Vivian Ogu Movement was inaugurated in 2014 by the Catholic Archbishop of Benin.

== Beatification process ==
Archbishop Augustine Obiora Akubeze of Benin City inaugurated the Vivian Ogu Movement in March 2014. In May 2023, Archbishop Akubeze approved Christiana Marinelli, who is based in Rome, as the postulator of the cause. The Archbishop received the Suplex Libellius on 12 September 2023, as issued by the Dicastery for the Causes of Saints, and requested him to initiate the Cause for Canonization of Vivian Ogu. The Catholic Bishops' Conference of Nigeria gave its approval that the cause of her beatification and canonization be opened on 14 September 2023. The edict on the cause for beatification of the Servant of God was posted at the Holy Cross Cathedral on Saturday, 7 October 2023, by Archbishop Akubeze.
