= Diocese of Castabala =

Roman Catholic titular see

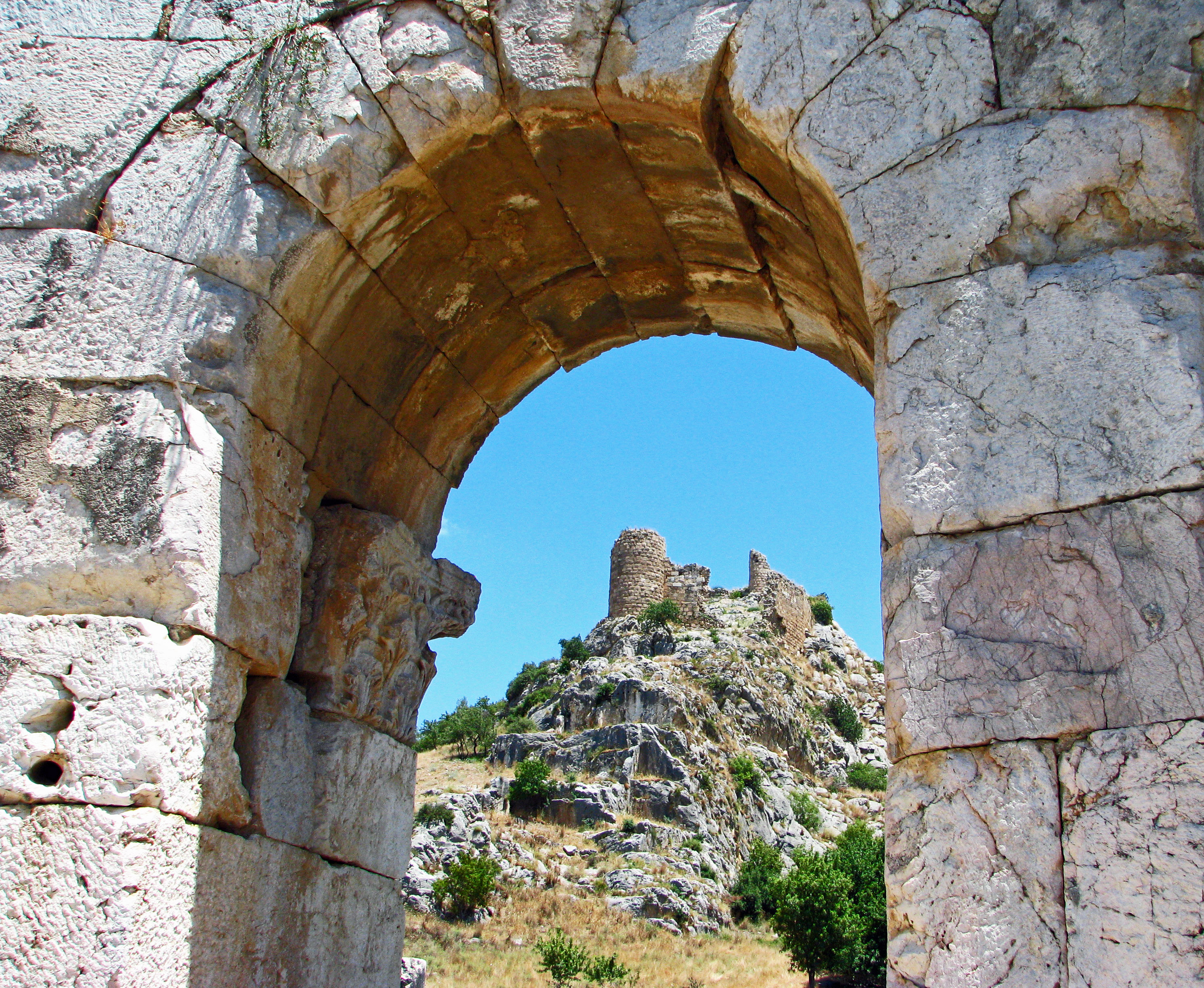

The Diocese of Castabala is a titular see in Turkey.

During Late Antiquity, the Diocese of Castabala was a suffragan to Anazarbus, the metropolis of the province of Cilicia Secunda.

The names of seven of its diocesan bishops are known. The first, Maris, is spoken of in an apocryphal letter of Saint Ignatius, with another letter addressed to him. A bishop Moyses from Catabala was present at the Council of Nicaea in 325. Theophilus, a semi-Arian and friend of Saint Basil, was sent to Rome on an embassy with two colleagues. The last, Theodorus, attended the Trullan Council in 692.

No longer a residential bishopric, Castabala is listed by the Catholic Church as a titular see.

== Titular Bishops ==
It has had the following incumbents, of the lowest (episcopal) rank:

- John Milner 1803.03.06 – 1826.04.19)
- John Murdoch (1833.06.04 – 1865.12.15)
- Louis Aloysius Lootens (1868.03.03 – 1898.01.12)Belgian, as Apostolic Vicar of Idaho and Montana (USA) (1868.03.03 – 1876.02.27) and as Auxiliary Bishop of Vancouver Island (Canada) (1876.02.27 – 1898.01.12)
- Rocco Tornatore, Pontifical Institute for Foreign Missions (1889.11.18 – 1908)
- John William Shaw (1910.02.07 – 1911.03.11) as Coadjutor Bishop of San Antonio (Texas, USA) (1910.02.07 – 1911.03.11), later succeeding as Bishop of San Antonio (1911.03.11 – 1918.01.25), later Metropolitan Archbishop of New Orleans (USA) (1918.01.25 – 1934.11.02)
- Juan José Marcos Zapata (1913.05.30 – 1951.05.13)
- Doroteo Fernández y Fernández (1956.03.06 – 1971.07.22)
- Patrick Ebosele Ekpu (1971.06.05 – 1973.07.05) (later Archbishop)
- Felipe Tejeda García, Missionaries of the Holy Spirit (M.Sp.S.) (2000.01.29 – ... ):, Auxiliary Bishop emeritus of México (Mexico)

== See also ==
- Catholic Church in Turkey
