= Amouda =

Cilician castle in Osmaniye, Turkey

Coordinates: 37°11′19″N 36°05′40″E

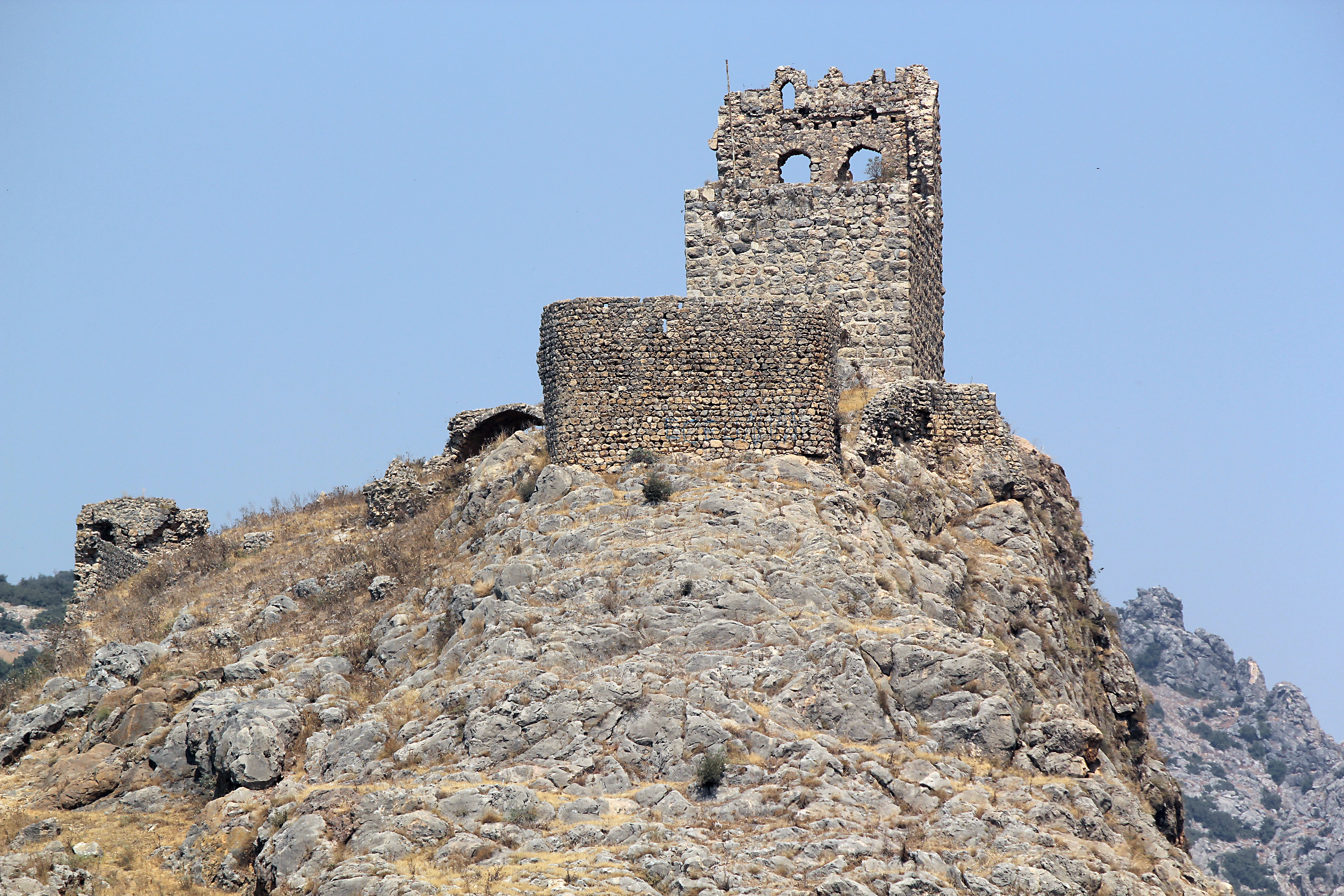
The ruins of Amouda Castle

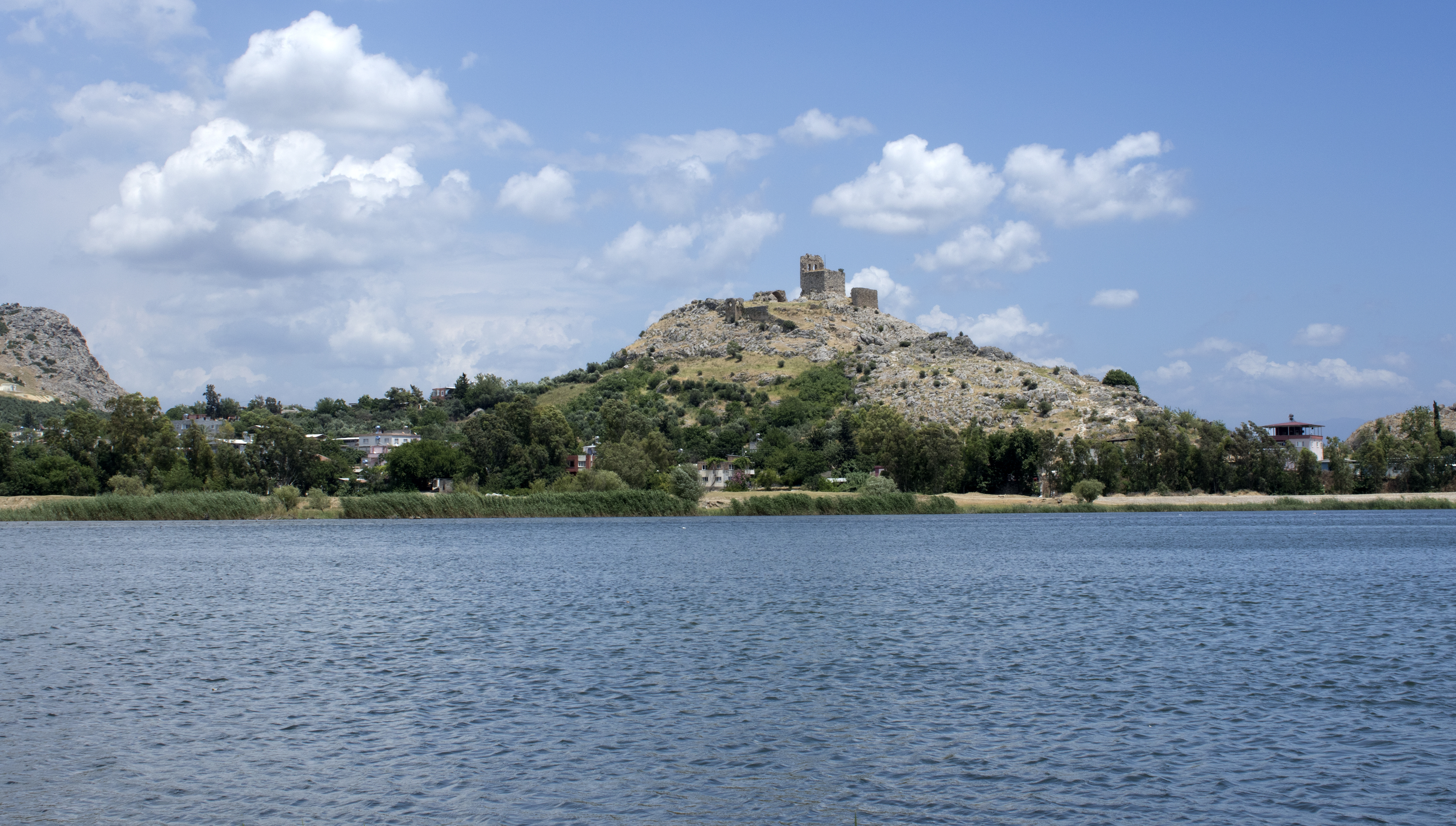
Amouda Castle and Ceyhan River

The former Crusader castle of Amouda, in what was the Armenian Kingdom of Cilicia, and today close to the village of Gökçedam in the Turkish Province of Osmaniye. The castle was deeded by the Armenian king Levon I to the Teutonic Knights in 1212 (Barber 2008) and rebuilt by them in the 13th century. It earned revenue for the Teutonic Order from the surrounding land. According to contemporary sources, the castle provided shelter for 2,200 people during the invasion by the Mamluks in 1266.

== Architecture ==
In 1987 an archaeological and historical assessment of the site, as well as a surveyed plan, were published. From atop the outcrop this castle has clear inter-visibility with at least five others forts. Based on an analysis of the masonry, there were at least three major periods of construction and/or repair, with the most prominent contribution from the Crusader occupation. Unlike Armenian designs, it has a simple rectangular plan dominated at the southwest by a four-story keep with cisterns in the lowest level.

The design of Amouda is similar to the Teutonic Knights's castle at Montfort with a keep guarding the entrance (Molin 2001).

== See also ==
- List of Crusader castles
