= Bodrumkale =

Castle in Osmaniye Province, Turkey

- Osmaniye Province in Turkey
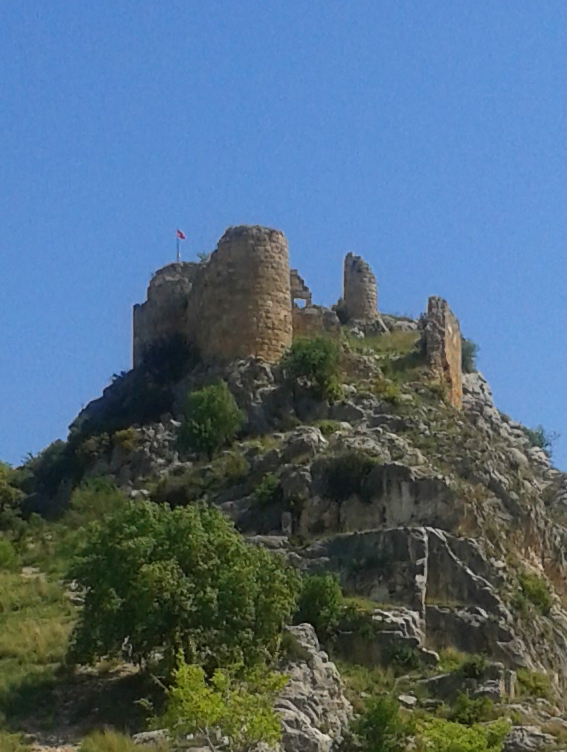
- Bodrumkale in Osmaniye Province, Turkey

Location
- Coordinates: 37°10′39″N 36°11′15″E

Site history
- In use: 13th century

Bodrumkale is a castle ruin in Osmaniye Province, Turkey. It is situated on a hill, about 12 kilometres (7.5 mi) away from Osmaniye. The castle is to the northeast of the ancient city of Castabala. In medieval times it controlled the road from Central Anatolia to the Mediterranean coast. In 1973 an archaeological assessment and accurate plan were published. The castle is divided into two baileys or wards and has six towers. Most of its masonry was cut directly from the limestone outcrop and not plundered from the ancient city below. The lower level of the south tower functioned as a cistern. The survey was conducted under the auspices of the University of California at Berkeley.

It is dated to 13th century during the Armenian Kingdom of Cilicia. When the castle was captured by the Ramadanids in the 14th century, it was already abandoned.
