= Diocese of Uromi =

Roman Catholic diocese in Edo State, Nigeria

Diocese of Uromi Dioecesis Uromiensis
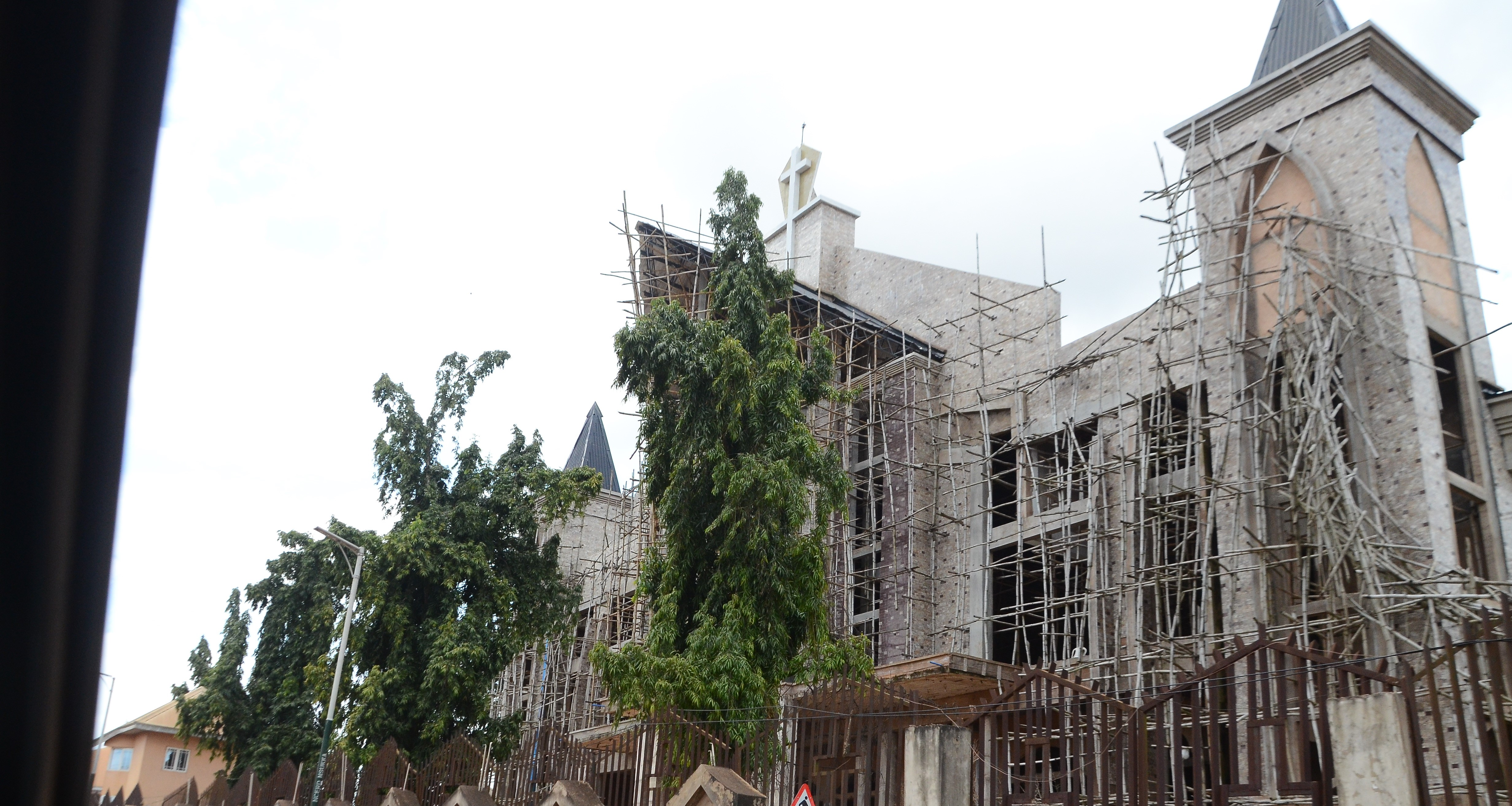
- St. Anthony Catholic Church, Uromi

Location
- Country: Nigeria
- Territory: Edo State
- Ecclesiastical province: Archdiocese of Benin City
- Metropolitan: Benin City
- Coordinates: 6°42′00″N 6°20′00″E

Statistics
- Area: 2,938 km^{2} (1,134 sq mi)
- Population: Total; Catholics: (as of 2022); 874,000; 181,000 (20.7%)
- Parishes: 18

Information
- Denomination: Catholic
- Sui iuris church: Latin Church
- Rite: Roman Rite
- Established: December 14, 2005
- Cathedral: Cathedral of Saint Anthony of Padua in Uromi
- Secular priests: 107

Current leadership
- Pope: Leo XIV
- Bishop: Donatus Aihmiosion Ogun

Map
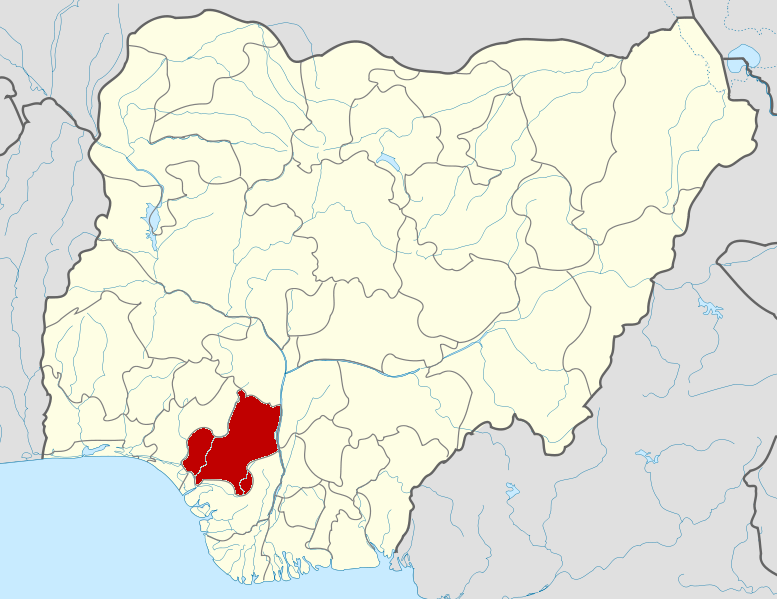
- Edo State is shown in red.

Website
- uromidiocese.org

The Roman Catholic Diocese of Uromi (Dioecesis Uromiensis) is a Catholic diocese of the Latin Church of Nigeria. It was created on 14 December 2005 from the Archdiocese of Benin City. Its first bishop was Augustine Obiora Akubeze and the seat the diocese is the Cathedral of St Anthony of Padua in Uromi, Edo State.

The canonical erection of the diocese and the episcopal ordination of the bishop took place on Saturday, February 25, 2006. It covers an area of 2,800 km² of the Edo State, covering the local government areas of Esan West, Esan Central, Esan North-East, Esan South-East and Igueben. Neighboring dioceses are Auchi to the north, Issele-Uku to the south and Benin City to the west. The total population of the diocese is 780,000, of which 102,045 are catholic. The diocese is subdivided into 23 parishes Mass Centres.

== Bishops of Uromi ==
- Augustine Obiora Akubeze (2005–2011)
- Donatus Aihmiosion Ogun (2015–present)
