= Patrick Ebosele Ekpu =

Nigerian Roman Catholic prelate (1931–2024)

- Archbishop Emertus of Benin City
- Installed: 26 March 1994
- Term ended: 21 November 2006
- Predecessor: First
- Successor: Richard Anthony Burke
- Previous posts: Titular Bishop of Castabala (1971–1973); Bishop of Benin City (1973–1994)

Orders
- Ordination: 7 July 1963
- Consecration: 21 November 1971 by Amelio Poggi

Personal details
- Born: 26 October 1931 Uromi, Colony and Protectorate of Nigeria
- Died: 6 August 2024 (aged 92) Benin City, Edo State, Nigeria
- Motto: Ut unum sint

Styles of Patrick Ebosele Ekpu
- Reference style: His Excellency; The Most Reverend
- Spoken style: Your Excellency
- Religious style: Archbishop

Patrick Ebosele Ekpu (26 October 1931 – 6 August 2024) was a Nigerian prelate of the Catholic Church. He served as archbishop of the Archdiocese of Benin City from 1994 to 2006, having elevated from bishop of that city in which he served from 1973 to 1994. He also served as Titular Bishop of Castabala from 1971 to 1973. He helped in many Catholic projects.

== Biography ==
=== Priesthood ===
On 7 July 1963, Ekpu received the Sacrament of Ordination for the Diocese of Benin City.

=== Bishop and archbishop ===
On 5 June 1971, Ekpu was appointed by Pope Paul VI as Coadjutor Bishop of Benin City and Titular Bishop of Castabala. The apostolic delegate to Central West Africa [that is, Nigeria], Amelio Poggi, consecrated him on 21 November of the same year; co-consecrators were Alexius Obabu Makozi, Auxiliary Bishop of Lokoja, and Patrick Joseph Kelly S.M.A., Bishop of Benin City.

After Bishop Kelly had resigned, Bishop Ekpu succeeded him on 5 July 1973 as Bishop of Benin City. When it was elevated to an archdiocese, on 26 March 1994, his title was changed to archbishop of Benin City.

On 21 November 2006, Pope Benedict XVI granted Epku's age-related resignation application.

=== Death ===
Ekpu died on 6 August 2024, at the age of 92.

Catholic Church titles
Preceded by First	Archbishop of Benin City; 1994–2006	Succeeded by Richard Anthony Burke
Preceded by Doroteo Fernández y Fernández	Titular Bishop of Castabala; 1971–1973	Succeeded by Felipe Tejeda García
