= Gökçedam =

Gökçedam Hemite
- Village
- Location within Turkey
- Coordinates: 37°11′25″N 36°05′31″E
- Country: Turkey
- Province: Osmaniye
- District: Osmaniye
- Population (2022): 586
- Time zone: UTC+3 (TRT)

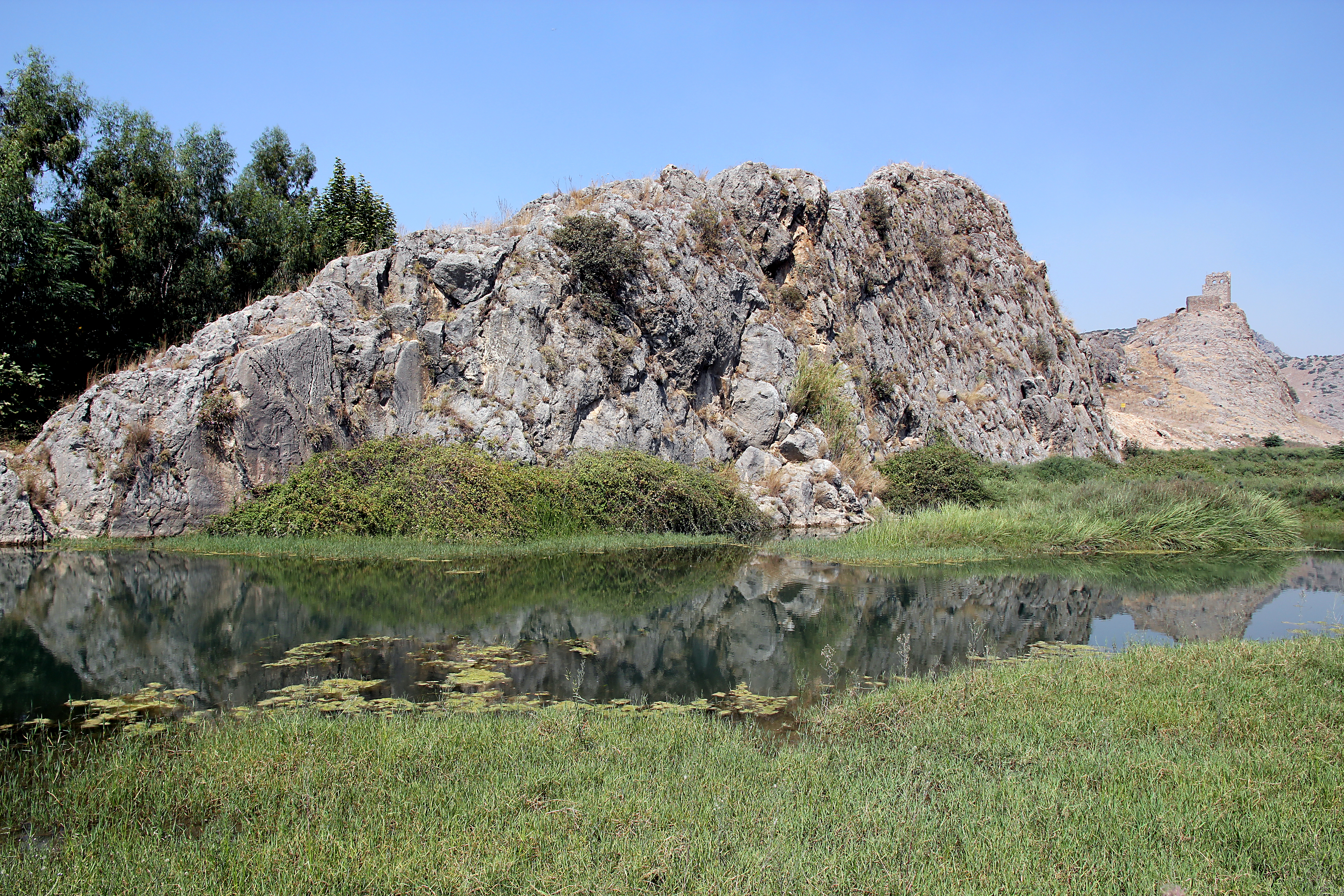

Gökçedam (also known as Hemite) is a village in the Osmaniye District in Osmaniye Province, Turkey. Its population is 586 (2022). The village is inhabited by Turkmens. It was the birthplace of the famous Turkish novelist of Kurdish origin Yaşar Kemal.

Its most conspicuous feature is a plug of rock in the centre of the village with a ruined castle perched on its summit. The Ceyhan river passes the outskirts of the village and there is a waterside park with a small museum to Yaşar Kemal (not always open).

== Etymology ==
Originally a Roman castle, the settlement was listed as Al-ˁAmûdayn, meaning "two pillars" in Arabic, by Ibn Khordadbeh in 870. In 12th century, Matthew of Edessa referred to the place as Amuda or Amudan. According to Sevan Nişanyan, the original Turkish name of the village was borrowed from its Armenian form of Amuta.
