= Nicolas Eugene Walsh =

American prelate

His Excellency, The Most Reverend Nicolas Eugene Walsh
- Auxiliary Bishop of Seattle; Titular Bishop of Volsinium
- Church: Roman Catholic Church
- See: Archdiocese of Seattle
- In office: August 10, 1976 to September 6, 1983
- Other posts: Bishop of Yakima; 1974 to 1976; Titular Bishop of Volsinium; 1976 to 1983

Orders
- Ordination: June 6, 1942 by John Gregory Murray
- Consecration: October 28, 1974 by Sylvester William Treinen

Personal details
- Born: October 20, 1916 Burnsville, Minnesota, US
- Died: April 21, 1997 (aged 80)
- Education: St. Paul Seminary; Catholic University of America
- Motto: I am your brother

Styles of Nicolas Eugene Walsh
- Reference style: The Most Reverend
- Spoken style: Your Excellency
- Religious style: Monsignor
- Posthumous style: none

Nicolas Eugene Walsh (October 20, 1916 – April 21, 1997) was an American prelate of the Roman Catholic Church. He served as the third bishop of the Diocese of Yakima in Washington State from 1974 to 1976 and as an auxiliary bishop of the Archdiocese of Seattle in Washington State from 1976 to 1983.

== Biography ==
=== Early life ===
Nicolas Walsh was born on October 20, 1916, in Burnsville, Minnesota, to Patrick J. and Julia (née McDermott) Walsh. He completed his philosophical and theological studies at St. Paul Seminary in St. Paul, Minnesota and earned a Master of Education degree from the Catholic University of America in Washington, D.C.

=== Priesthood ===
Walsh was ordained to the priesthood for the Diocese of Boise at the Cathedral of Saint Paul in St. Paul, Minnesota, on June 6, 1942, by Archbishop John Murray. Walsh served chancellor of the diocese, diocesan director of the Confraternity of Christian Doctrine, and superintendent of diocesan schools. In 1958 he became the founding editor of the Idaho Catholic Register. He was also pastor of St. Mary's Parish in Caldwell, Idaho.

=== Bishop of Yakima ===
On September 5, 1974, Pope Paul VI appointed Walsh as the third bishop of Yakima. He received his episcopal consecration in Boise, Idaho, on October 28, 1974, from Bishop Sylvester Treinen, with Archbishops James Byrne and Alberto Urdaneta serving as co-consecrators. Walsh remained in Yakima for two years.

=== Auxiliary Bishop of Seattle ===
On August 10, 1976, Paul VI allows Walsh to resign for health reasons as bishop of Yakima; he instead appointed him as an auxiliary bishop of Seattle and titular bishop of Volsinium.

Pope John Paul II accepted Walsh's resignation as auxiliary bishop of Seattle on September 6, 1983. Nicholas Walsh died on April 21, 1997, in Tucson, Arizona, at age 80.

Catholic Church titles
Preceded by Cornelius Michael Power	Bishop of Yakima; 1974–1976	Succeeded by William S. Skylstad
