= Kırmıtlı =

- Village
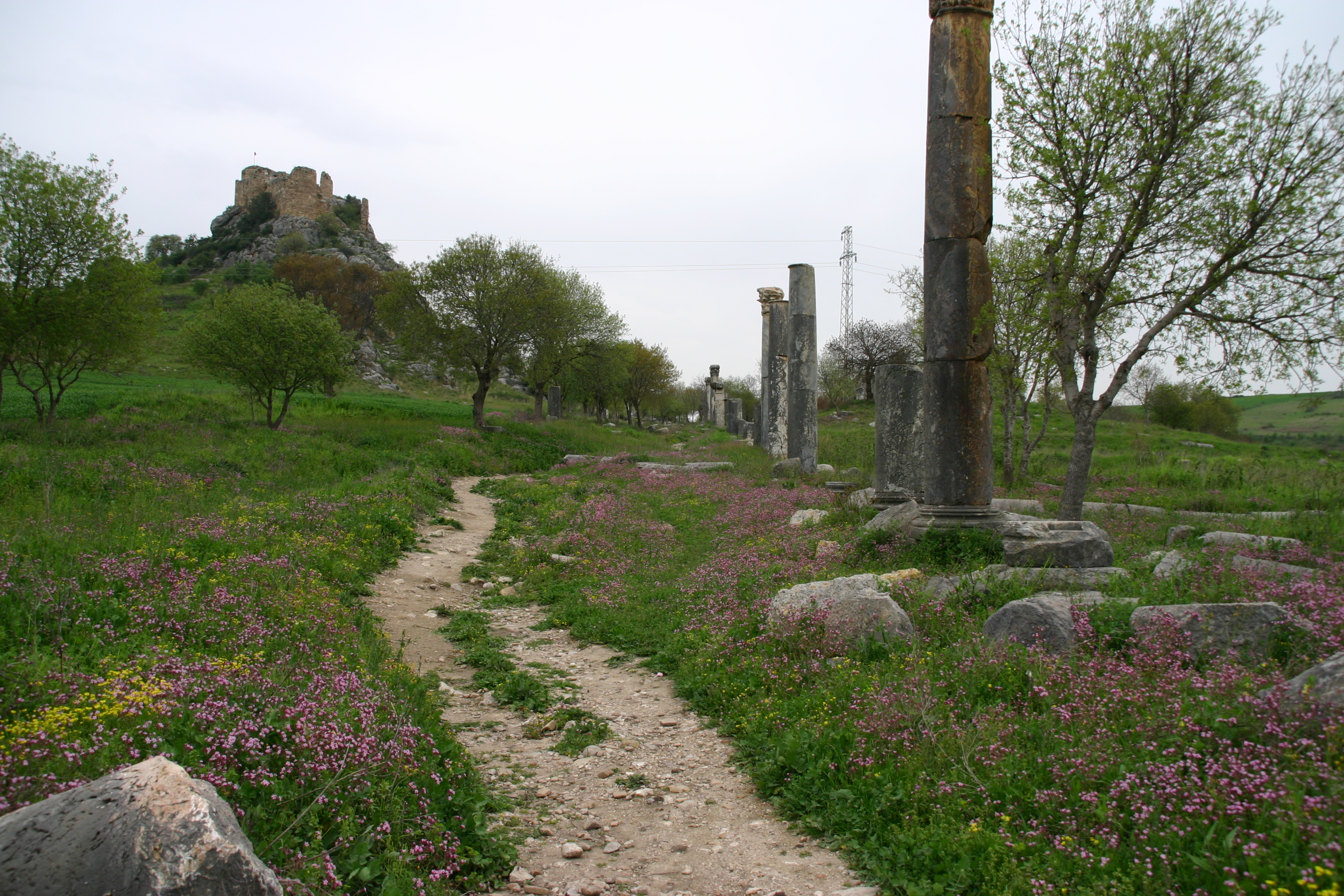
- Hierapolis kastabala

- Location within Turkey
- Coordinates: 37°10′N 36°08′E
- Country: Turkey
- Province: Osmaniye
- District: Osmaniye
- Elevation: 50 m (160 ft)
- Population (2022): 767
- Time zone: UTC+3 (TRT)
- Postal code: 80480
- Area code: 0328

Kırmıtlı is a village in the Osmaniye District of Osmaniye Province, Turkey. Its population is 767 (2022). Before the 2013 reorganisation, it was a town (belde). It lies along Ceyhan River. It is situated at the east end of Çukurova (Cilicia of the antiquity) plains. Distance to Osmaniye is 17 kilometres (11 mi). The town is a part of a bird sanctuary known as Castabala valley. There are ruins of the ancient city of Castabala around the town.
