= Diocese of Yakima =

Latin Catholic diocese in the US

Coordinates: 46°35′48″N 120°31′46″W

Diocese of Yakima Dioecesis Yakimensis
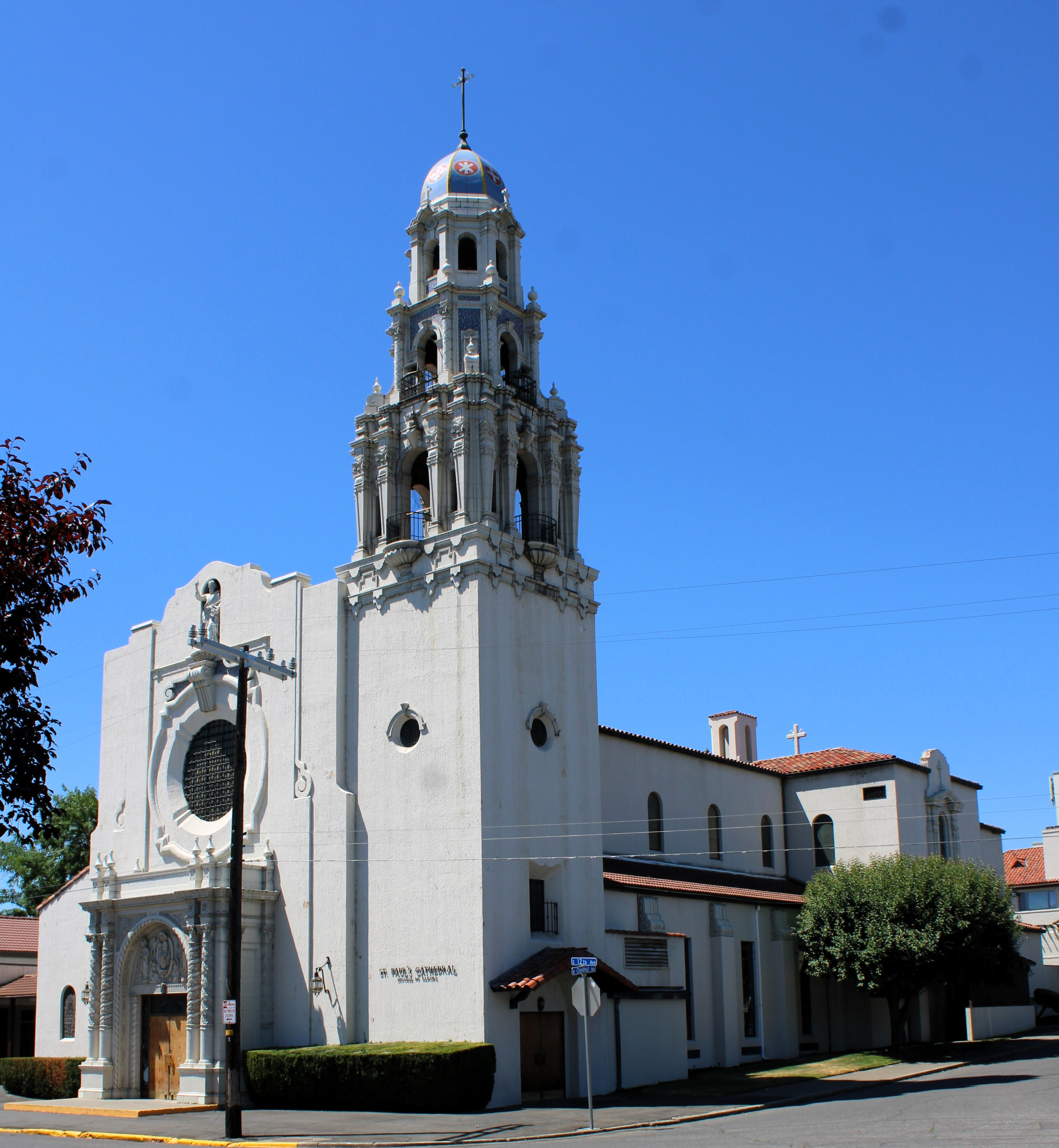
- St. Paul Cathedral

- Coat of arms

Location
- Country: United States
- Territory: Central Washington State
- Ecclesiastical province: Province of Seattle

Statistics
- Population: Total; Catholics: (as of 2022); 751,808; 190,000 (▲25.3%)
- Parishes: 39

Information
- Denomination: Catholic Church
- Sui iuris church: Latin Church
- Rite: Roman Rite
- Established: June 23, 1951
- Cathedral: St. Paul Cathedral

Current leadership
- Pope: Leo XIV
- Bishop: Joseph J. Tyson
- Metropolitan Archbishop: Paul Etienne
- Bishops emeritus: Carlos Arthur Sevilla

Map
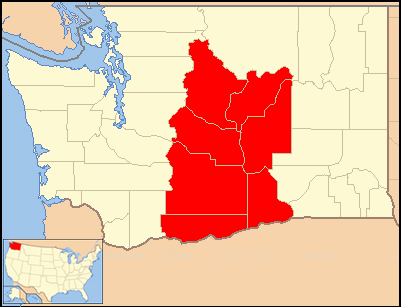

Website
- yakimadiocese.org

The Diocese of Yakima (Latin: Dioecesis Yakimensis) is a diocese of the Catholic Church in central Washington State in the United States. It is a suffragan see in the ecclesiastical province of the metropolitan Archdiocese of Seattle. The mother church is St. Paul Cathedral in Yakima. As of 2026, the bishop is Joseph J. Tyson.

== Territory ==
The Diocese of Yakima comprises Benton, Chelan, Douglas, Grant, Kittitas, Klickitat and Yakima Counties.

== History ==
=== 1850 to 1950 ===
The first Catholic presence in the Yakima Valley was St. Joseph Mission, founded near Ahtanum Creek in 1852. Louis Joseph D'herbomez and Charles M. Pandosy established the mission on Yakama tribal land at the request of Chief Kamiakin. In 1855, at the start of the Yakama Indian War, soldier of the US Army burned the mission. St. Joseph Mission was rebuilt in 1870. However, the priests were forced to leave the Yakama lands by local authorities the next year. St. Joseph became a parish church in Yakima.

A contingent from the Sisters of Charity of Providence arrived in Yakima in 1875, where they established the first Catholic school in the city. In 1891, they opened St. Elizabeth Hospital in North Yakima to serve workers on the Sunnyside Canal. St. Rose of Lima Parish opened in Ephrata in 1904.In Kennewick, St. Joseph's Parish was founded in 1911, the first parish in that city.St. Paul's Parish was founded in Yakima in 1914.

In 1943, Christ the King was established as a mission in Richland to serve workers construction the Hanford Engineer Works. It became a parish in 1946.

=== 1950 to 2000 ===
The Diocese of Yakima was erected on June 23, 1951, by Pope Pius XII. Its territory was taken from the Dioceses of Seattle and Spokane. The pope named Joseph Dougherty of Seattle as the first bishop of Yakima. In 1969, Dougherty became an auxiliary bishop of the Archdiocese of Los Angeles.

The second bishop of Yakima was Cornelius Power of Seattle, selected by Pope Paul VI in 1969. Five years later, he became archbishop of the Archdiocese of Portland. To replace Power, Paul VI named Nicolas Walsh from the Diocese of Boise in 1974. After only two years, Walsh became an auxiliary bishop in Seattle.

In 1977, Paul VI appointed William S. Skylstad of Spokane as the next bishop of Yakima. After 13 years of service as bishop, Skylstad became bishop of Spokane in 1990. He was replaced by Pope John Paul II with Francis George in 1990. George was named archbishop of Portland in 1996.

Auxiliary Bishop Carlos Arthur Sevilla of the Archdiocese of San Francisco was the next bishop of Yakima, named by John Paul II in 1996.

=== 2000 to present ===
Sevilla retired in 2011. To replace Sevilla, Pope Benedict XVI named Auxiliary Bishop Joseph J. Tyson of Seattle the same year. In 2011, Tyson began a migrant ministry program in which every seminarian assists and ministers to migrant workers. This was inspired by the Youth Migrant Project in Seattle.

In November 2023, the diocese erected a memorial stone in the Calvary Catholic Cemetery in Yakima to Maria Goretti, an Italian saint. The stone contains a prayer for healing for all victims of sexual abuse.

As of 2026, Tyson is the bishop of Yakima.

=== Sex abuse ===
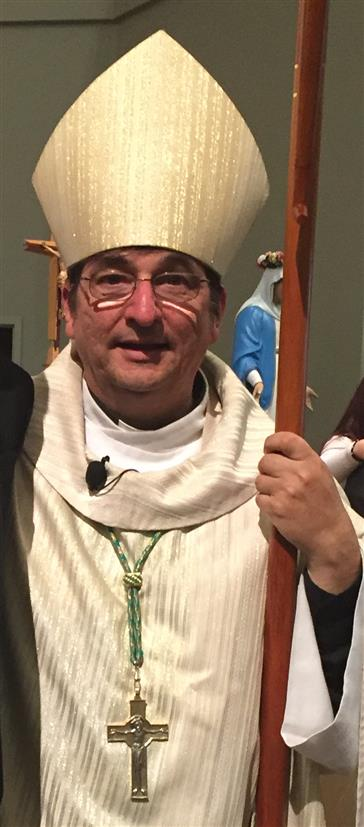
Bishop Tyson (2017)

In January 2008, the Diocese of Yakima agreed to pay $25,000 each to four women who stated they had been sexually abused by Michael Simpson. The alleged crimes took place at Saint Aloysius Parish in Toppenish when the plaintiffs were minors.

In May 2008, Sevilla admitted that he failed to notify parishioners in the diocese about Jose Joaquin Estrada Arango, a priest convicted in 2008 of fondling a 14-year-old girl in Oregon. Estrada had worked in four parishes in Yakima between 2001 and 2003.

The Richland Police Department arrested Robert Davalle, a permanent deacon at Christ the King Parish in Richland, in June 2017 on two counts of first-degree child molestation. Two sisters had accused him of touching them inappropriately in the 2000s. He pleaded guilty in May 2018 to two counts of child molestation and was sentenced to prison for at least five years.

In July 2019, the diocese published a list of 21 priests and deacons with credible accusations of sexual abuse of minors. In September 2019, the Vatican instructed Archbishop Paul Etienne of Seattle to investigate Sevilla's handling of sexual abuse cases and to determine if he retaliated against diocesan employees who criticized his actions. In July 2022, Francis released a formal reprimand to Sevilla over his handling of sexual abuse allegations.

== Bishops of Yakima ==
1. Joseph Patrick Dougherty (1951–1969)
2. Cornelius Michael Power (1969–1974), appointed Archbishop of Portland in Oregon
3. Nicolas Eugene Walsh (1974–1976), appointed auxiliary bishop of Seattle
4. William Stephen Skylstad (1977–1990), appointed Bishop of Spokane
5. Francis George (1990–1996), appointed Archbishop of Portland in Oregon and later Archbishop of Chicago (elevated to Cardinal in 1998)
6. Carlos Arthur Sevilla (1996–2011)
7. Joseph J. Tyson (2011–present)

== Churches ==
As of 2025, the Diocese of Yakima had 44 parishes.

== Education ==
As of 2025, the Diocese of Yakima had six elementary schools and one high school:

- Christ the King School – Richland
- Christ the Teacher Catholic school – Yakima
- La Salle High School – Yakima
- St. Joseph/Marquette School – Yakima
- St. Joseph School – Kennewick
- St. Joseph School – Wenatchee
- St. Rose of Lima School – Ephrata
