= Castabala (city) =

Ancient city in Turkey

Coordinates: 37.17743°N 36.18744°E

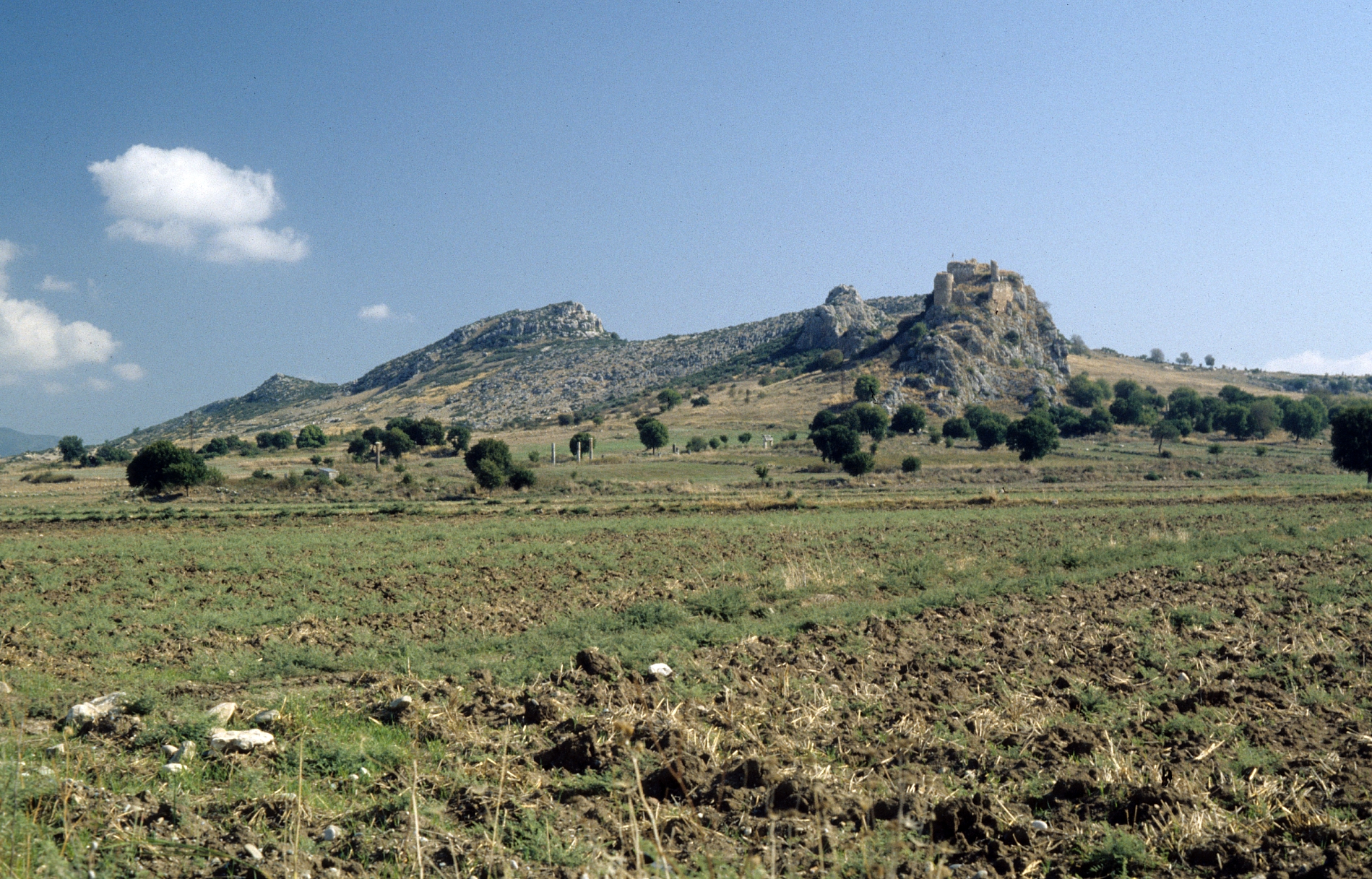
Acropolis of the city

Castabala (Greek: Καστάβαλα), also known as Hieropolis and Hierapolis (Greek: Ίεράπολις) was a city in Cilicia (modern southern Turkey), near the Ceyhan River (ancient Pyramus).

The Turkish town of Kırmıtlı, in the Osmaniye district of Osmaniye Province, is about 3 miles wsw of the ancient city.

The ruins were first identified from inscriptions in March 1890 by the British explorer J. Theodore Bent.

== Iron Age ==
Castabala was one of the cities of the Late Hittite period. The name Castabala was probably of Luwian origin.

== Classical Age ==
The city was captured by Achaemenid Empire and became part of the Cilician satrapy. Later it was taken by Alexander the Great. The city was first mentioned in literature when Alexander the Great made a stage before the Battle of Issos.

During the Hellenistic period and Roman period it was called Hieropolis, known as either Hieropolis on the Pyramos or as Hieropolis Castabala. In the first century BC, after the Cilician pirates were defeated, it became the capital of Tarcondimotus, a ruler of a small client kingdom. Later, the city became a part of Cappadocia Province in the Roman Empire.

At the city there was the sanctuary of Artemis Perasia (Περασίας Ἀρτέμιδος ἱερόν). According to Strabo, the priestesses were walking with naked feet over hot embers without pain. He also added that "some tell us over and over the same story of Orestes and Tauropolus, asserting that she was called Perasian because she was brought from the other side."

== Roman Period ==
The city was important enough in the Roman province of Cilicia Secunda to become a suffragan of its capital Anazarbus's Metropolitan Archbishopric, but would fade.

== Titular see ==
The Diocese of Castabala is a titular bishopric of the Catholic Church reflecting its active status in Late Antiquity.

== Gallery ==
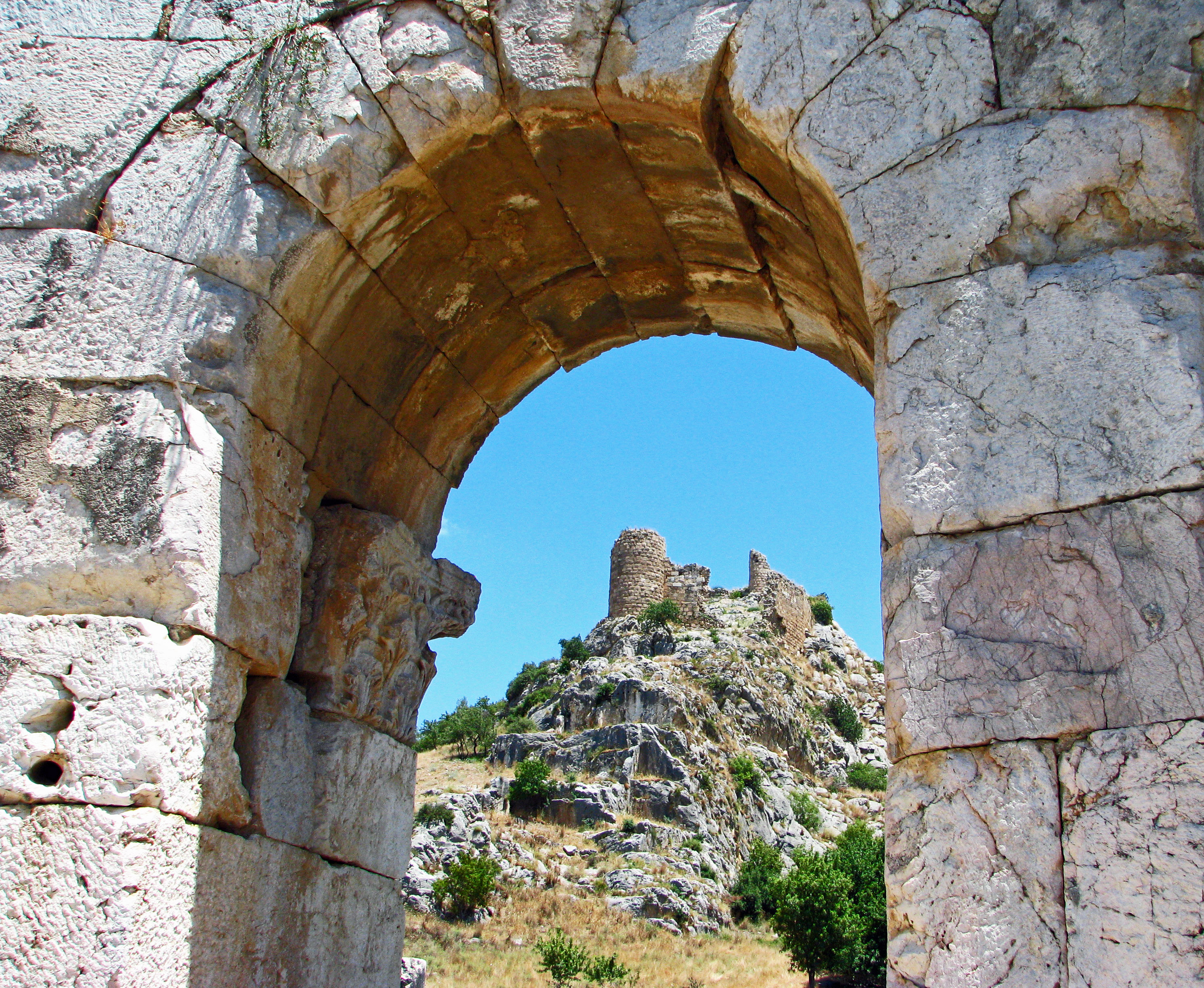

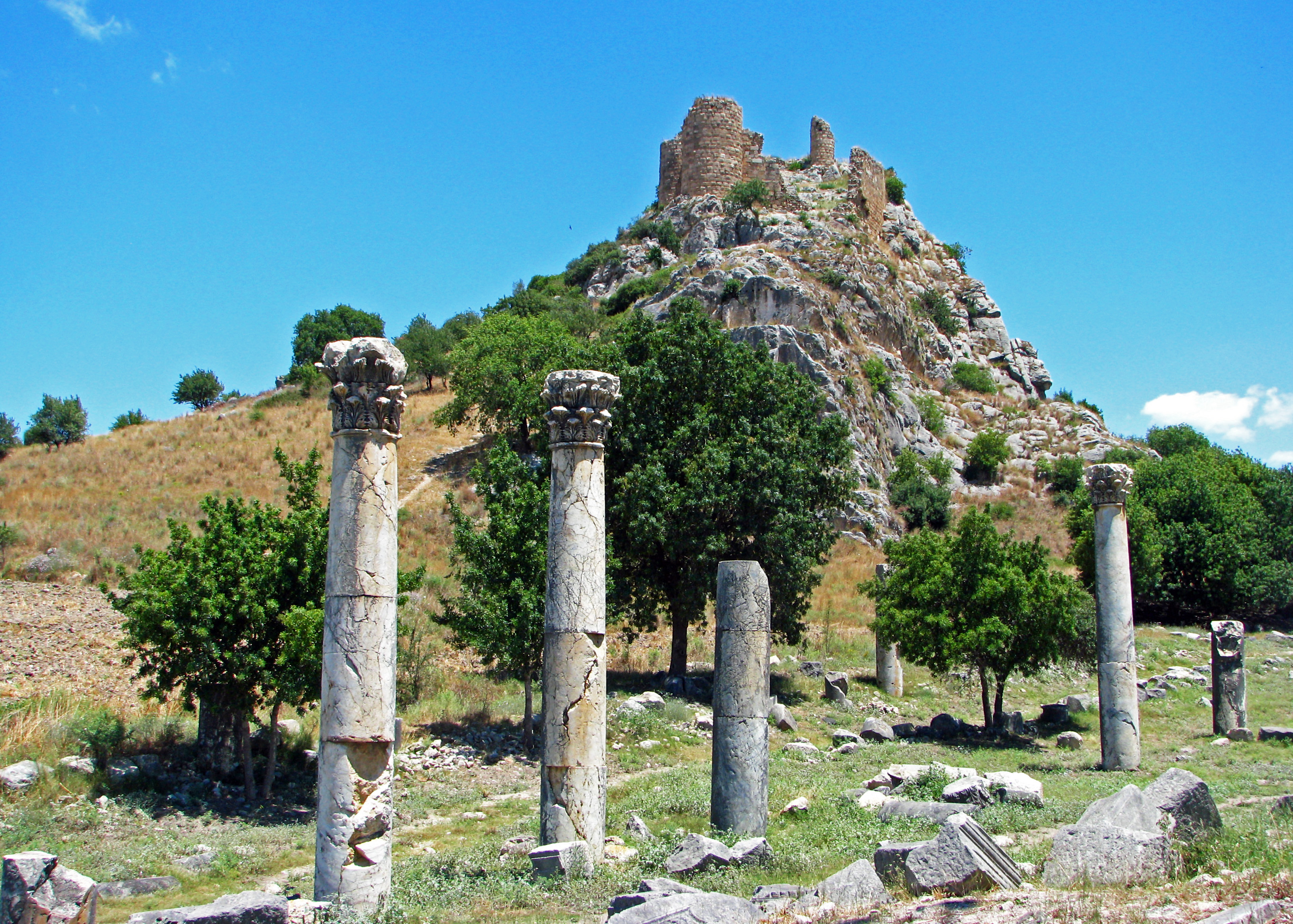

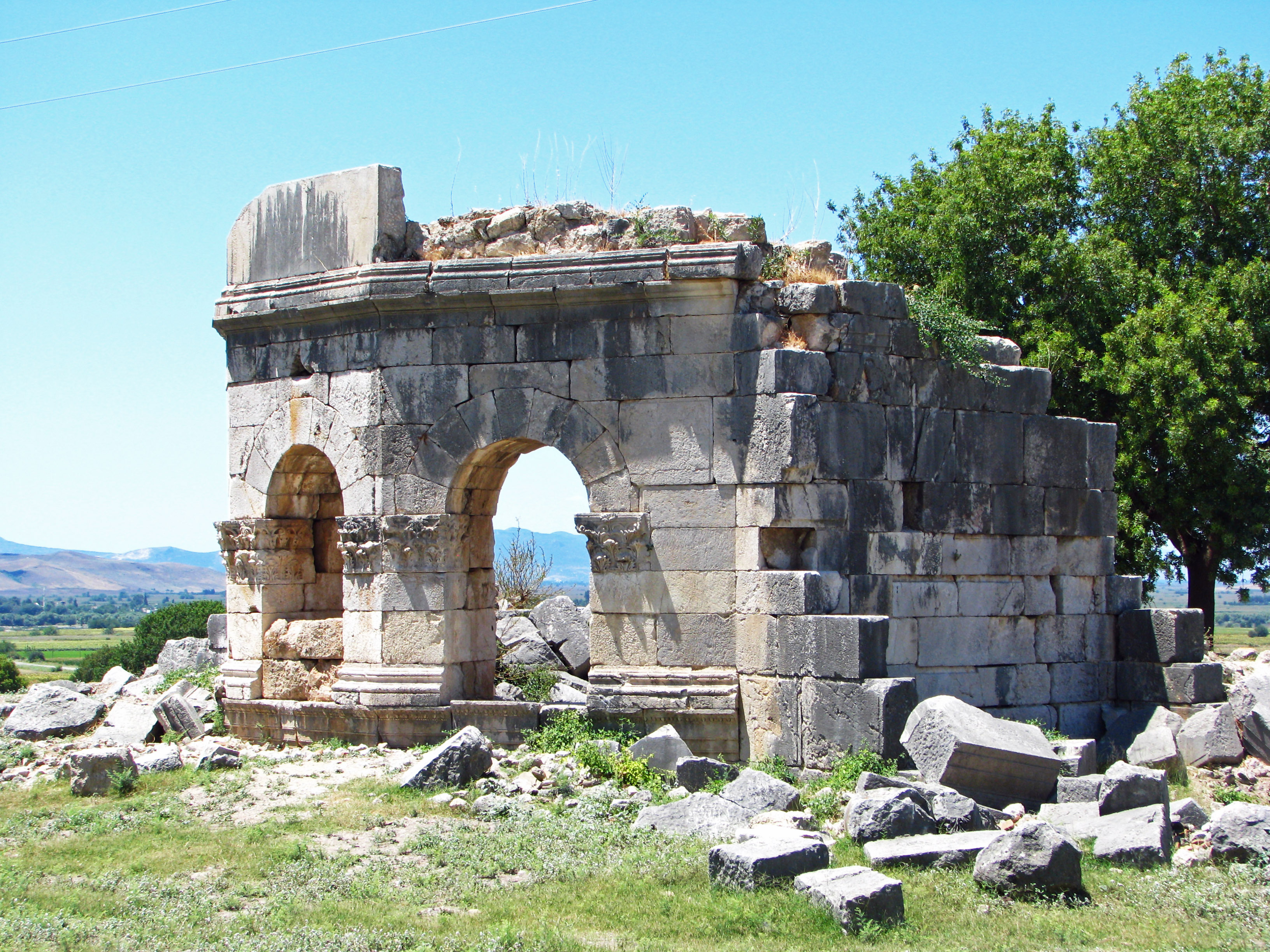

== See also ==
- Bodrumkale

== Source and External links ==
- GCatholic, with titular incumbent biography links
