= Osmaniye District =

District of Osmaniye Province, Turkey

- District
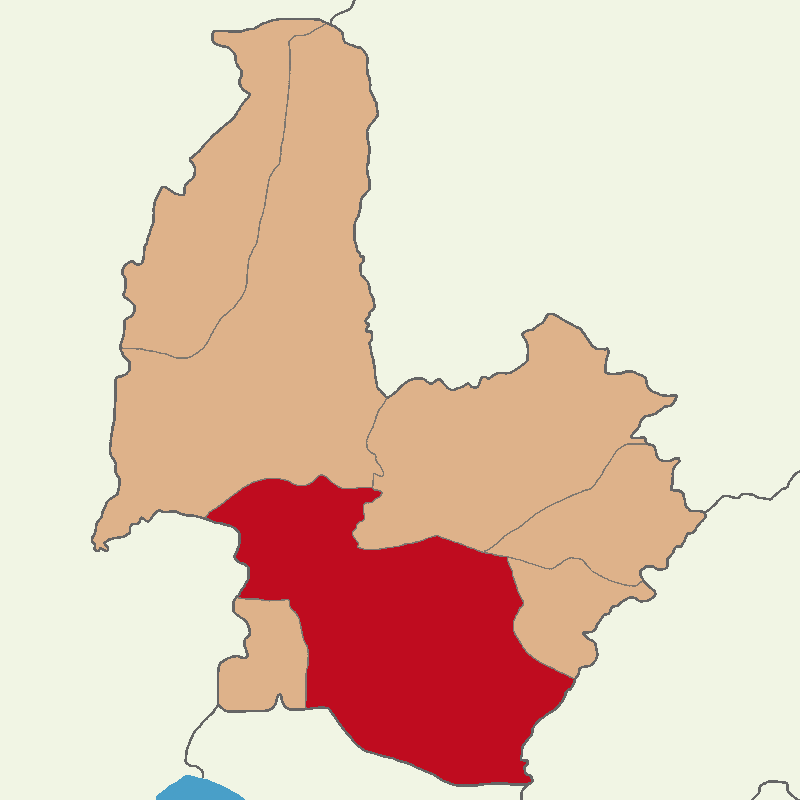
- Map showing Osmaniye District in Osmaniye Province

- Location in Turkey
- Coordinates: 37°05′N 36°15′E
- Country: Turkey
- Province: Osmaniye
- Seat: Osmaniye
- Area: 859 km^{2} (332 sq mi)
- Population (2022): 285,430
  - Density: 330/km^{2} (860/sq mi)
- Time zone: UTC+3 (TRT)

Osmaniye District (Turkish: Osmaniye ilçesi) is a district of the Osmaniye Province of Turkey. Its seat is the city of Osmaniye. Its area is 859 km^{2}, and its population is 285,430 (2022).

== Composition ==
There are two municipalities in Osmaniye District:

- Cevdetiye
- Osmaniye

There are 36 villages in Osmaniye District:

- Arslanlı
- Bahçe
- Çağşak
- Çardak
- Çona
- Değirmenocağı
- Dereli
- Dereobası
- Dervişli
- Gökçedam
- Issızca
- Karacalar
- Karataş
- Kayalı
- Kazmaca
- Kesmeburun
- Kırıklı
- Kırmacılı
- Kırmıtlı
- Koçyurdu
- Köyyeri
- Küllü
- Kumarlı
- Nohuttepe
- Orhaniye
- Oruçgazi
- Sakarcalık
- Sakızgediği
- Sarpınağzı
- Şekerdere
- Selimiye
- Serdar
- Serinova
- Tehçi
- Yarpuz
- Yeniköy
