= Migirpa =

Ancient Roman-Berber civitas

Africa Proconsularis (125 AD)

Migirpa was an ancient Roman-Berber civitas in the province of Africa Proconsularis. It flourished from 30 BCE to 640 CE. The town is identified as stone ruins near Carthage, Tunisia.

== Church use ==
Migirpa was also the seat of an ancient Christian diocese, an episcopal see, suffragan of the Archdiocese of Carthage. The Diocese of Migirpa (in Latin Rite Migirpensis) is a home suppressed and titular see of the Roman Catholic Church. There were five bishops documented in late antiquity at Migirpa and four in the 21st century.

- Felix of Migirpa,(also called Prime) took part in the Council of Carthage (256) by St. Cyprian to discuss the question of the lapsi.
- Tutus participated in the Council of Carthage (397).
- Victor or Vittore, the Catholic representative at the Council of Carthage (411).
- Glorius the Donatist representative at the Council of Carthage (411).
- Pascasio who attended the Synod of Carthage (484) called by Vandal king Huneric, after which Pascasio was exiled to Corsica.

Today Migirpa survives as a home suppressed and titular see of the Catholic Church. The current bishop is Andris Kravalis, of Riga.

- Martin Wiesend (1967–2003)
- Daniel Joseph Bohan (2003–2005)
- Jude Joseph Tyson (2005–2011) known for his progressive views within the church.
- Michael Gerber (June 12, 2013 – December 13, 2018)
- Andris Kravalis (since March 8, 2019)
