= Diocese of Mina =

Roman Catholic titular see

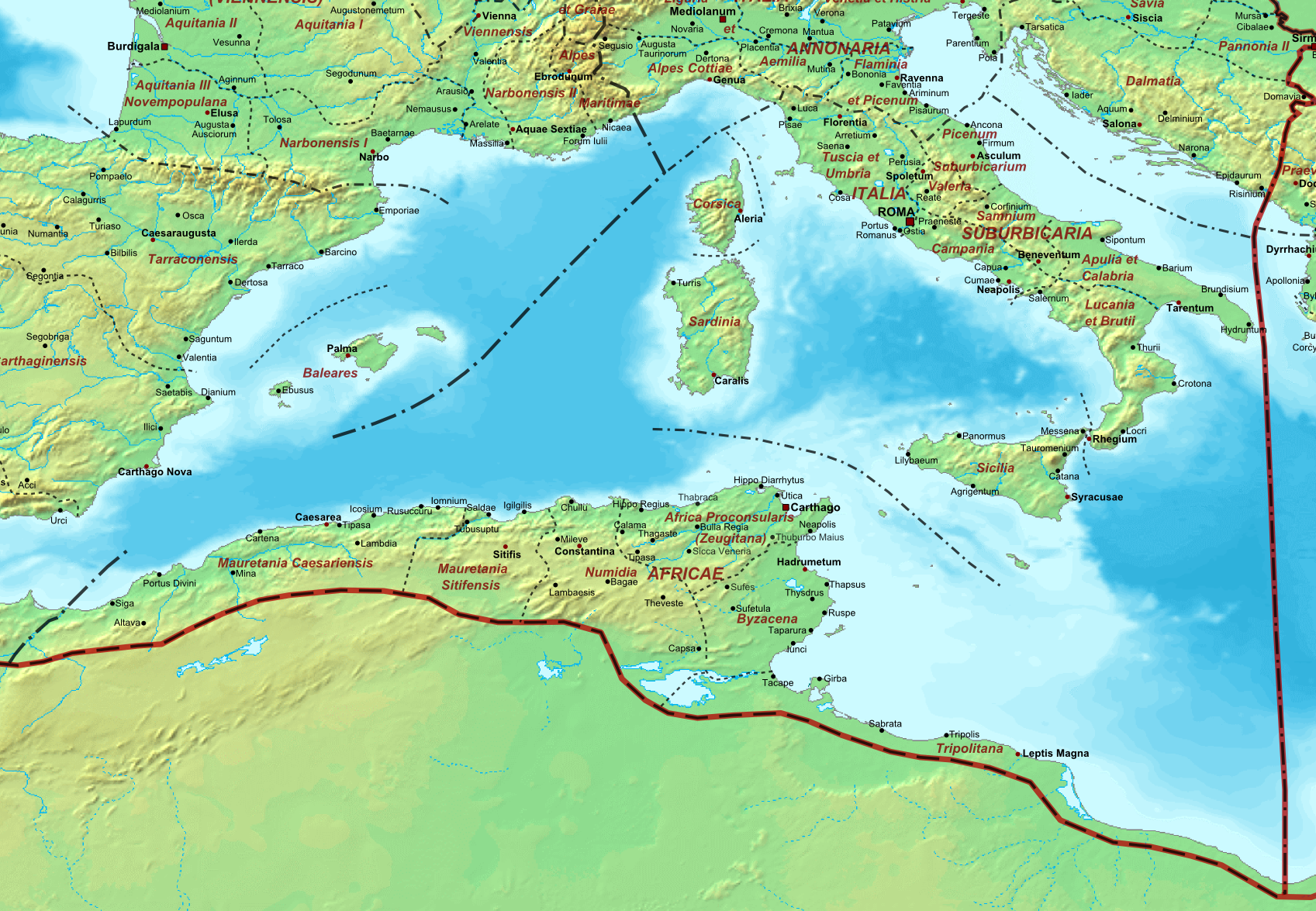
- The location of the Diocese of Mina in the province of Mauretania Caesariensis

Location
- Ecclesiastical province: Mina

Current leadership
- Bishop: Cécilus; Secondinus

The Diocese of Mina (Latin: Dioecesis Minensis) was a Roman–Berber civitas and Roman Catholic diocese in Mauretania Caesariensis. It is a Catholic Church titular see.

== History ==
Mina was a civitas of the Roman province of Mauretania Caesariensis. It has been tentatively identified with ruins near Relizane in modern Algeria. While Mina flourished in late antiquity, it did not last long after the Muslim conquest of the Maghreb.

== Known bishops ==
- Cecilio took part in the synod assembled in Carthage in 484 by King Huneric the Vandal, after which the bishop was exiled.
- Secondino intervened at the Carthaginian Council of 525.
- Herman Joseph Meysing, 1929–1951
- Joseph Mark McShea 1951–1962
- Heinrich Theissing 1963–1988
- Carlos Arthur Sevilla 1988–1996
- John 'Oke Afareha 1997–2010
- Wilfried Theising, auxiliary bishop of Münster 2010–current
