= Diocese of Auchi =

Roman Catholic diocese in Edo State, Nigeria

Diocese of Auchi Dioecesis Auchianus
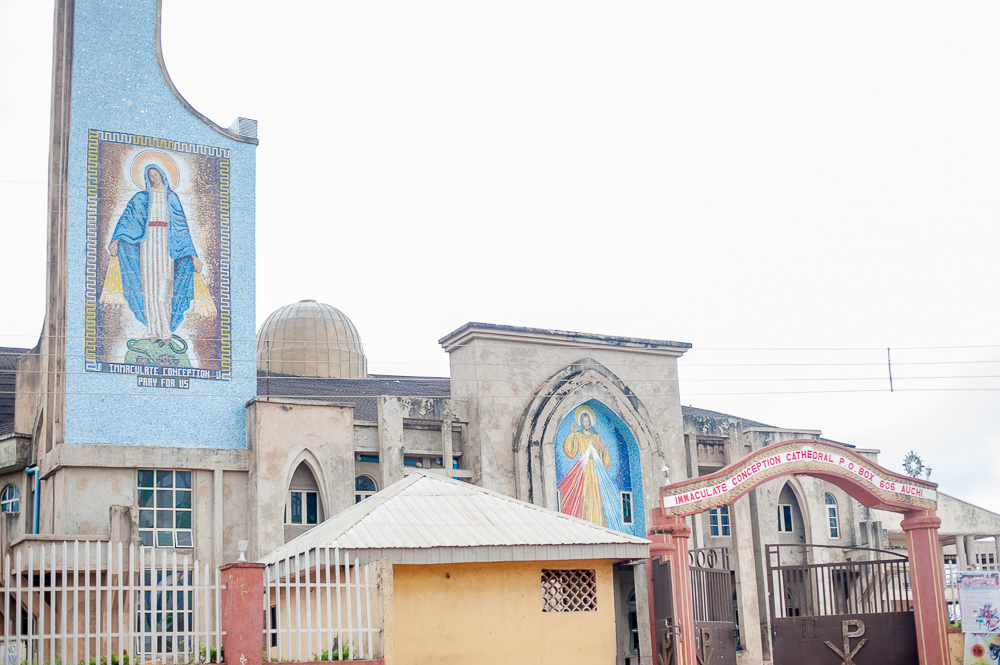
- Auchi Cathedral

Location
- Country: Nigeria
- Territory: a portion of Edo State
- Ecclesiastical province: Benin City
- Metropolitan: Benin City
- Coordinates: 7°04′00″N 6°16′00″E

Statistics
- Area: 6,116 km^{2} (2,361 sq mi)
- Population: Total; Catholics: (as of 2022); 1,207,554; 124,256 (10.3%)
- Parishes: 60

Information
- Denomination: Roman Catholic
- Rite: Latin Rite
- Established: December 4, 2002
- Cathedral: Saint Vincent Cathedral in Auchi
- Secular priests: 84

Current leadership
- Pope: Leo XIV
- Bishop: Most Rev. Gabriel Ghiakhomo Dunia

Map
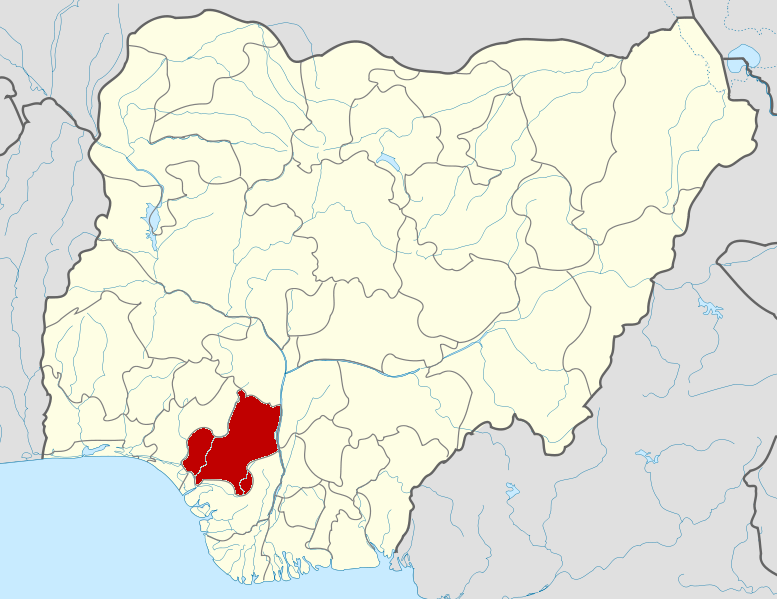
- Auchi is in Edo State which is shown here in red.

Website
- verbummail.com/auchi/chaplaincies.php

The Roman Catholic Diocese of Auchi (Latin: Auchian(us)) is a diocese located in the city of Auchi, Edo State in the ecclesiastical province of Benin City in Nigeria. The diocese was established in 2002, and as of 30 December that year there were 10 parishes in the diocese.

== History ==
=== Arrival of first missionaries and establishment of parishes ===
The history of the Catholic Church in Etsako - Afemai land, which is now the Diocese of Auchi, dates back to the latter part of the 19th century when the first Roman Catholic missionaries arrived at Agenebode in the present Etsako East Local Government Area of Edo State in Nigeria and opened a mission station there. The team was led by Carlo Zappa, who took over as the Prefect of the Upper Niger in 1894, with headquarters in Asaba.

As Prefect, Zappa successfully gained access into the interior and established stations throughout the territory now forming the Benin ecclesiastical province.

In Etsako, he opened a parish station at Agenebode in 1897.

From the narratives of oral traditional history recalled by the community elders, it was gathered that through the successful settlement of the Royal Niger Company, a foreign trading company which included the John Holt brothers and early explorers like Richard Lander, the missionaries discovered that the Agenebode people were easily accessible through the River Niger and to some degree hospitable to foreigners. This gave them confidence to pitch their tents among the people. The oral narratives show that these white missionaries had already had contacts with the Agenebode indigenes as far back as 1884 - exploring the possibility of opening a parish church within the community. Prior to 1897, there has to be all kinds of logistics - preparations, negotiations and gathering of people before a church community starts. It took them about 13 years to build a base before a parish was finally established in 1897.

Benin City diocese celebrated its centenary year at Agenebode on May 2, 1984; amid other ceremonies in other parts of the diocese, there were questions about the timing, but some living protégés of those missionaries testified that the timing was correct, because there were earlier contacts before a church community was established.

It was at Agenebode that the first parish station was opened in the Archdiocese of Benin City, with Peter Pioten as the first parish priest. From Agenebode, other parish out-stations were opened at Ivianokpodi, Iviukwe, Okpekpe and Apana.

In 1908, he established the first Major Seminary in Nigeria: St Martin's Seminary at Ivianokpodi. The seminary was later transferred to Asaba in 1927 by Bishop Broderick. Among the seminarians who moved from Ivianokpodi to Asaba was Paul Emechete, the first Nigerian priest, and Joseph Agbodio Erameh, a native of Anegbette in south Uneme Clan in present Etsako Central Local Government Area of Edo State.

=== 1933-1999 ===
With the death of Bishop Broderick in 1933, Bishop Leo Taylor was appointed his successor in 1934. Bishop Taylor who came to Asaba-Benin Vicariate from Lagos where he was principal of St. Gregory's College, created Uzairue Parish in 1935, with J.J. Heeley as the first parish priest.

Bishop Taylor ordained the first Edo priest who was also the second indigenous priest of the Vicariate Apostolic of Western Nigeria in the person of Joseph Agbodio Erameh at Asaba, on December 20, 1936, and transferred the Major Seminary there to Benin in 1938. Bishop Taylor was succeeded in the Asaba-Benin Vicarite by Bishop Patrick Joseph Kelly SMA in the same year.

In the same 1973, Bishop Kelly retired and handed over the Diocese of Benin City to Bishop Patrick Ebosele Ekpu (now Archbishop Emeritus). Conscious of the fact that the task of evangelizing the diocese was onerous, Archbishop Ekpu worked very hard to see that many more indigenous priests were ordained and new parishes were created.

=== Akoko-Edo and Owan ===
The history of the Catholic Church in the diocese will not be complete without accounts of its spread to Akoko-Edo and Owan Local Government Areas of the Diocese, which with Etsako constitute the geographical areas comprising the Diocese.

In contrast to the warm welcome which the early Catholic Missionaries received in Etsako, their experience in Akoko-Edo and Owan Local Government Areas was one of initial resistance, if not down-right hostility, by the Anglican Church Missionary Society, which was the first Christian Mission to establish a presence in these areas. The relatively slow pace of conversion to the Catholic faith and of vocation to the Catholic Priesthood in the areas up to date can be attributed, in part to this historical fact.

== Education and health care ==
The Catholic Church in Etsako established four secondary schools during the episcopacy of P J Kelly: Our Lady of Fatima College, Auchi, St. John's College, Fugar, St. Angela's Girls Grammar School, Uzairue, and St. Peter's College, Agenebode, which were taken over by Government in 1973. Archbishop Ekpu's repeated attempts to have the schools returned to the Catholic Mission foundered on the stony rock of the Nigeria Union of Teachers. They resisted fiercely: the union's opposition to the Government's attempt to return the erstwhile Voluntary Agency schools to their owners somehow derailed progress. However, there are very few private Catholic schools scattered all over Auchi diocese, serving the educational needs of the people.

The early missionaries, in collaboration with some Irish nuns, established two major medical facilities: Notre Dame Hospital at Uzairue and the Medical Health Centre at Agenebode. The Sisters of Notre Dame de Namur now manage these hospitals. They have been working hard to keep these hospitals open, so that many people - Catholics and non Catholics - especially the poor, can have access to quality health care within Afemai territory.

== Cathedral ==
The Cathedral is Immaculate Conception Cathedral in Auchi. The Cathedral of St. Vincent is an upshoot of a project started by parish priest Michael Grace. After his demise, this project was continued by Felix Igbineweka and then Obozuwa. Obozuwa was deeply committed to this project because discussions were underway that this parish will be the future home of soon to be erected diocese of Auchi and the cathedral.

== Persecution and insecurity ==
- In 2022, Fr Christopher Odia was murdered in a botched kidnapping attempt.
- On 27 October 2024 armed bandits attacked the Immaculate Conception Minor Seminary and attempted to abduct two students. The rector of the seminary, Fr. Thomas Oyode, intervened and offered to be taken in place of the two young boys. He was released on 6 November, unharmed.
- On 3 March 2025, major seminarian Andrew Peter was kidnapped, along with Fr Philip Ekweli on 3 March. Although Fr Philip was released ten days later, on 13 March, it emerged that the seminarian had been murdered by his kidnappers.
- On 10 July 2025 the Immaculate Conception Minor Seminary was again attacked. Bandits killed a security officer and made off with three seminarians, who as of August 14, 2025 had yet to be released.

== Leadership ==
- Bishops of Auchi (Roman rite)
  - Bishop Gabriel Ghiakhomo Dunia (since November 6, 2002)

== See also ==
- Roman Catholicism in Nigeria

== Sources ==
- Official website of the Diocese of Auchi
- GCatholic.org
- Catholic Hierarchy
