= Anthony Ewherido =

Nigerian Catholic prelate

Most Reverend Anthony Ewherido
- Native name: Ovayero
- Diocese: Warri

Orders
- Ordination: 18 October 1986
- Consecration: 9 February 2023 by Anthonio Guido Filipazzi

Personal details
- Born: October 8, 1960 (age 65)
- Denomination: Roman Catholic

Styles of Anthony Ovayero Ewherido
- Reference style: His Excellency
- Spoken style: Your Excellency
- Religious style: Bishop

Anthony Ovayero Ewherido (born 8 October 1960) is a Nigerian Catholic prelate who has served as the bishop of the diocese of Warri since his appointment by Pope Francis on 28 December 2022. He was installed on 9 February 2023.

== Biography ==
Anthony Ewherido is a native of Eghwu In Ughelli South LGA of Delta State where he was born on 8 October 1960. He attended the Minor Seminary in Effurun and completed his philosophical and theological studies at Saints Peter and Paul Major Seminary in Ibadan. He was awarded a doctorate degree in biblical studies at Saint John's University and Fordham University in New York and also obtained a diploma at the Pontifical Athenaeum Regina Apostolorum in Rome. He was ordained a priest on 18 October 1986 and incardinated in the Diocese of Warri. Between 1988 and 1992, he was made Rector of the Holy Martyr's of Uganda Minor Seminary in Effurun and Parish priest of the Mother of the Redeemer Catholic Church in Effurun from 1992 to 1994. He was made residential priest with pastoral duties at Our Lady of Victory Catholic Church in Floral Park from 1994 to 2005 and at St. Frances Cabrini Catholic Church in Coram, New York from 1995 to 2006. He was appointed Chaplain at Stony Brook University Medical Center in Stony Brook, New York between 1995 and 2006. He was Parish priest of the Sacred Heart in Abraka, Delta State from 2006 to 2007 and since 2007 he became a Lecturer and Formator at the Saints Peter and Paul Interdiocesan Major Seminary in Ibadan. He was Vice-rector of the SS. Peter and Paul interdiocesan Major Seminary between 2013 and 2019 and later became a lecturer at the Dominican Institute in Samonda, Ibadan from 2013 to 2021. Until his appointment as Bishop, he has been the Rector of the Saints Peter and Paul interdiocesan Major Seminary since 2019.

On 28 December 2022, he was appointed Bishop of Warri diocese by Pope Francis, following the retirement of Bishop John Oke’Oghene Afareha.
