= Carlos Arthur Sevilla =

American Catholic prelate (born 1935)

His Excellency, The Most Reverend Carlos Arthur Sevilla S.J.
- Bishop Emeritus of Yakima
- Diocese: Yakima
- Appointed: December 31, 1996
- Installed: 1997
- Retired: April 12, 2011
- Predecessor: Francis George
- Successor: Joseph J. Tyson
- Previous post: Auxiliary Bishop of San Francisco and Titular Bishop of Mina (1989-1997)

Orders
- Ordination: June 3, 1966 by John Raphael Quinn
- Consecration: January 25, 1989 by John R. Quinn, Mark Joseph Hurley, and Michael Joseph Kaniecki

Personal details
- Born: August 9, 1935 (age 90) San Francisco, California
- Education: Gonzaga University; Santa Clara University; Jesuit College Innsbruck
- Motto: To love and to serve

Styles of Carlos Arthur Sevilla
- Reference style: His Excellency; The Most Reverend
- Spoken style: Your Excellency
- Religious style: Bishop

Carlos Arthur Sevilla SJ (born August 9, 1935) is an American Catholic prelate who served as Bishop of Yakima from 1996 to 2011 and as an auxiliary bishop for the Archdiocese of San Francisco from 1988 to 1996. He is a member of the Jesuits.

== Early life ==
Carlos Arthur Sevilla was born on August 9, 1935, in San Francisco, California, and entered the Society of Jesus in 1953. He studied at Gonzaga University in Spokane, Washington, where he obtained his Master of Philosophy degree

== Priesthood ==
On June 3, 1966, Sevilla was ordained to the priesthood for the Society of Jesus in San Francisco by Archbishop John Quinn. Sevilla made his solemn profession to the Society of Jesus on April 22, 1974. Sevilla earned his Master of Theology degree from Santa Clara University in Santa Clara, California, and attended the Jesuit College Innsbruck in Innsbruck, Austria, and the Catholic Institute of Paris.

== Auxiliary Bishop of San Francisco ==
On December 6, 1988, Pope John Paul II appointed Sevilla as an auxiliary bishop of San Francisco and titular bishop of Mina. Sevilla received his episcopal consecration at the Cathedral of Saint Mary of the Assumption in San Francisco on January 25, 1989, from Quinn, with Bishops Mark Hurley and Michael Kaniecki serving as co-consecrators.

== Bishop of Yakima ==
On December 31, 1996, John Paul II named Sevilla as the sixth bishop of Yakima. Sevilla was the second member of a religious order and the first Jesuit to hold that office.

Within the United States Conference of Catholic Bishops (USCCB) Sevilla sat on the Committee for Ecumenical and Interreligious Affairs and the Sub-Committee for Translation of Liturgical Texts into Spanish. He also co-chaired the West Coast Dialogue of Catholics and Muslims. Sevilla is the former chair of the Committee on Religious Life and Ministry and the Sub-Committee for Translation of Liturgical Texts Into Spanish.

In April 2008, Sevilla accepted blame for hiring Reverend Juan Gonzalez, a priest from Oregon, in 2003 to work as a retreat director for the diocese. Gonzalez was being investigated at that time by police in Marion County, Oregon, for viewing child pornography. Sevilla knew about the investigation, but hired Gonzalez anyway. Police later notified Sevilla that they had filed charges against Gonzalez, but the diocese did not follow up on the report.

In May 2008, Sevilla admitted that he failed to notify parishioners in the diocese about Reverend Jose Joaquin Estrada Arango, who had been convicted in 2008 of fondling a 14-year-old girl in Oregon. Estrada had worked in four parishes in the diocese between 2001 and 2003.

== Retirement ==
On May 31, 2011, with the installation of Bishop Joseph J. Tyson as the new bishop of Yakima, Sevilla became bishop emeritus. He spent the next several years in Yakima, helping Tyson and working with local ministries.

In 2014, Sevilla testified in a civil lawsuit against the diocese. The plaintiff claimed to have been sexually assaulted in 1999 at age 17 by a seminarian, Aaron Ramirez, at Resurrection Catholic Church in Zillah, Washington. The suit alleged that the diocese had been negligent in checking Ramirez's background when he applied to enter the priesthood. Ramirez fled to Mexico after the incident, where he became an Anglican priest. Sevilla did not notify Ramirez's Anglican archbishop about the alleged crimes until 2005.

In July 2016, Sevilla moved into the Jesuit community at Bellarmine College Preparatory in San Jose, California. In July 2021, Sevilla entered Sacred Heart Jesuit Center, a retirement home for Catholic clergy in Los Gatos, California. Sevilla works as a spiritual director, arranges retreats and conferences and helps with weekend masses in local parishes.

== See also ==
- Catholic Church hierarchy
- Catholic Church in the United States
- Historical list of the Catholic bishops of the United States
- List of Catholic bishops of the United States
- Lists of patriarchs, archbishops, and bishops

Catholic Church titles
Preceded by Francis George, OMI	Bishop of Yakima; 1997–2011	Succeeded by Joseph J. Tyson
Preceded by -	Auxiliary Bishop of San Francisco; 1989-1996	Succeeded by -
