= Diocese of Warri =

Roman Catholic diocese in Delta State, Nigeria

Diocese of Warri Dioecesis Varriensis

Location
- Country: Nigeria
- Territory: southern portion of Delta State
- Ecclesiastical province: Benin City
- Metropolitan: Archbishop of Benin City
- Coordinates: 5°31′00″N 5°45′00″E

Statistics
- Area: 15,000 km^{2} (5,800 sq mi)
- Population: Total; Catholics: (as of 2004); 2,614,857; 186,298 (7.1%)

Information
- Denomination: Roman Catholic
- Rite: Latin Rite
- Established: March 10, 1964
- Cathedral: Sacred Heart Cathedral in Warri

Current leadership
- Pope: Leo XIV
- Bishop: Anthony Ovayero Ewherido
- Bishops emeritus: John Okeoghene Afareha

Map
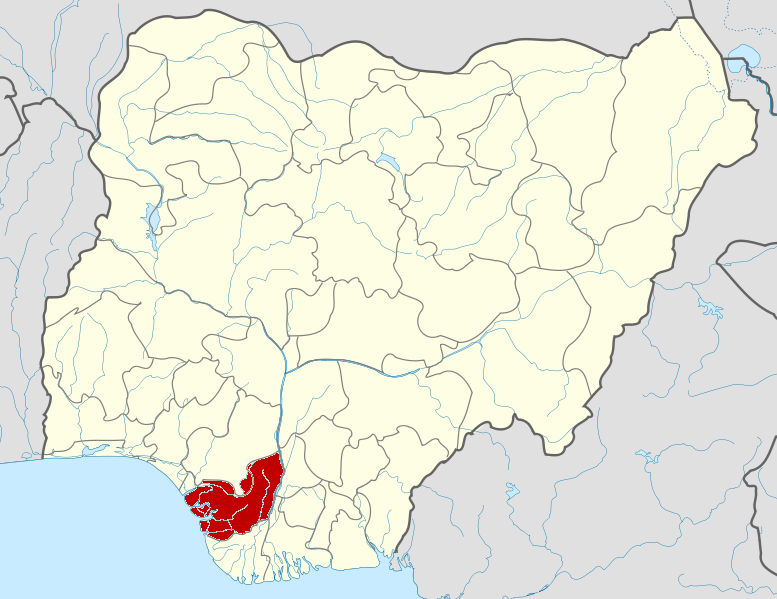
- The Diocese of Warri is located in the southern portion of Delta State which is shown in red.

The Roman Catholic Diocese of Warri (Latin: Varrien(sis)) is a diocese located in the city of Warri in the ecclesiastical province of Benin City in Nigeria.

== History ==
- March 10, 1964: Established as Diocese of Warri from the Diocese of Benin City

== Special churches ==
The Cathedral is Sacred Heart Cathedral in Warri.

== Bishops ==
Bishops of Warri

- Lucas Olu Chukwuka Nwaezeapu (1964.03.10 – 1983.09.10)
- Edmund Joseph Fitzgibbon, S.P.S. (1991.08.31 – 1997.03.03)
- Richard Anthony Burke, S.P.S. (1997.03.03 - 2007.12.24), appointed Archbishop of Benin City
- John Okeoghene Afareha (29 March 2010 – 18 April 2022)

Coadjutor Bishop

- Richard Anthony Burke, S.P.S. (1995-1997)

Auxiliary Bishop

- John ’Oke Afareha (1997-2010), appointed Bishop here

Other priests of this diocese who became bishops

- Joseph O. Egerega, appointed Vicar Apostolic of Bomadi in 1997

== Deaneries ==
=== Warri Deanery ===
1. Sacred Heart, Cathedral.
2. St. Paul, Odion.
3. Annunciation, Ogunu.
4. Holy Family, Edjeba.
5. Assumption, Idama.
6. Escravos Catholic Community.
7. St. Theresa's, Ubeji.
8. ANNUNCIATION Parish Bazunu
9. Our Lady Queen of Nigeria, Apala

=== Effurun Deanery ===
1. Mother of the Redeemer, Effurun.
2. Corpus Christi, Japka Road.
3. St. Jude, G.R.A.
4. Seat of wisdom, P.T.I.
5. St. Anthony, Ugborikoko.
6. St. Ambrose, Ekpan.
7. Blessed Tansi, Ugboroke.
8. St. John Vianney, New Layout.
9. pope John 11, Army Barracks.
10. Our Lady Queen of Peace, Navy Barracks.
11. Nativity, Alegbo.
12. Holy Trinity, Ugbomro.
13. Our Lady of the Rosary, Ebrumede.
14. St. Cyprian, Agaga oil field Road, Effurun.

=== Udu Deanery ===
1. St. Michael's, DSC.
2. St. Paul's, Enerhen.
3. St. Mary's, Ovwian.
4. St. Anthony's Ogbe-Ijoh.
5. St. Benedict's Oruhwhorun.
6. St. Peter's, Ekete Inland.
7. St. Thomas, Otokutu
8. st. Mathew, aladja

=== Sapele Deanery ===
1. St. Bridget, Amuogodo, Sapele.
2. St. Patick's, Sapele.
3. St. Martin's, Gana - Sapele.
4. St. Mary, Koko.
5. st. Felix, Oghara.
6. Sacred Heart, Abraka.
7. St. Paul's Chaplaincy, Abraka.
8. Holy Trinity, Oria-Abraka.
9. St Williams, Orerokpe.
10. St Partick’S Eku.
11. St. Mary Amukpe.
12. St. Peter's Okuokoko.
13. St. Theresa, Ovu Inland.
14. St. Theresa, Osubi.

=== Oleh Deanery ===
1. St. John the Baptist, Oleh.
2. Holy Trinity, Ozoro.
3. St. Matthias, Uzere.
4. St. Gregory, Olomoro.
5. St. Anthony, Otor-Owhe.
6. Annunciation Chaplaincy, Ozoro.
7. St. Peter's Chaplaincy, Oleh.
8. St. Monica's Aviara.
9. St. Mary's Irri.
10. St. Patrick, Owhelogbo.
11. St. Patrick, Ellu.
12. St. St Pio, Ozoro.
13. St. Dominic, Emevor.
14. St. Andrew, Ofagbe.

=== Kwale Deanery ===
1. St. John's, Abbi.
2. St. Peter's, Aboh.
3. St. Leo, Ashaka.
4. Holy Rosary, Utagha-Ogbe.
5. St. Michael Umutu.
6. Our Lady of Lourdes, Ndemili.
7. Christ the King, Obiaruku.
8. St. Theresa's, Obinomba.
9. St. Joseph's Aragba Orogun.
10. corpus christi, Obiaruku

=== Ughelli Deanery ===
1. SS Peter & Paul Ughelli.
2. St. Michael's Otorvwodo.
3. St. John's Ewreni.
4. St.Peter’s Eghwu.
5. St. Patrick's Okwagbe.
6. Assumption Ekuigbo.
7. Christ the king Okpara-inland.
8. HolySpirit, Ighrekpokpo.
9. St. Joseph's Okpare Olomu.
10. St. Joseph ‘s Oviri – Olomu.
11. St. Gregory's Agbarho.
12. Descent of the Holy Spirit, Agbarho.
13. St. Theresa's, Otoroh-Agbon
14. St. James, Kokori Inland.
15. St. Joseph's, Aragba Orogun.
16. Immaculate Conception, Usiefurun.
17. St. Theresa's Oloho Avenue.

== See also ==
- Roman Catholicism in Nigeria

== Sources ==
- GCatholic.org Information
- Catholic Hierarchy
- Eje
- s Gist News
