= Patrick Kelly (bishop of Benin City) =

Roman Catholic prelate; Bishop of Benin City

Styles of Patrick Joseph Kelly
- Reference style: The Most Reverend
- Spoken style: My Lord or Bishop

Patrick Joseph Kelly, SMA (31 August 1894 – 18 August 1991) was the Roman Catholic Bishop of Benin City in Nigeria.

A native of Barnacragh, Ballinasloe, his grandparents lived on the Seymour estate at Clontuskert. He attended Garbally College.

Trained as a missionary priest, Kelly joined the SMA (Society for African Missions), attending the seminary at Blackrock Road, Cork City. Ordained there on 29 June 1921, he spent much of his religious life in Nigeria. Many of his colleagues died on the missions.

He was appointed the vicar apostolic of Western Nigeria and titular bishop of Thignica by the Holy See on 11 December 1939 and was consecrated at St. Michael's Church, Ballinasloe on 2 June 1940, but was unable to return to Africa due to World War II until 1941. He aided in the construction of dozens of schools and churches in the diocese. There were 157 schools in 1939; in 1973, there were 786.

His title changed to Vicar Apostolic of Asaba-Benin in 1943 and Bishop of Benin City in 1950. He retired in 1973 and died in 1991, at age 96.

Catholic Church titles
Preceded by Leo Hale Taylor	Vicar Apostolic of Western Nigeria; 1939–1943	Title name changed
New title	Vicar Apostolic of Asaba-Benin; 1943–1950	Title name changed
New title	Bishop of Benin City; 1950–1973	Succeeded by Patrick Ebosele Ekpu
