= Richard Anthony Burke =

Irish Roman Catholic archbishop

Most Reverend Richard Anthony Burke
- Archbishop Emeritus of Benin City
- Church: Roman Catholic Church
- Archdiocese: Benin City
- Appointed: 24 December 2007
- In office: 2008 – 31 May 2010
- Predecessor: Patrick Ebosele Ekpu
- Successor: Augustine Obiora Akubeze
- Other posts: Bishop of Warri (1997–2007); Apostolic Administrator of Warri (2007–2010)

Orders
- Ordination: 18 May 1975
- Consecration: 6 January 1996 by Pope John Paul II, Giovanni Battista Re, Jorge María Mejía

Personal details
- Born: 19 February 1949 (age 77) Clonmel, County Tipperary, Ireland
- Denomination: Roman Catholic

Richard Anthony Burke (born 19 February 1949) is an Irish Catholic prelate.

Born in Clonmel, County Tipperary, Ireland, he was ordained a priest on 18 May 1975 for St. Patrick's Society for the Foreign Missions. He was appointed the coadjutor bishop for the Diocese of Warri, in Nigeria, on 6 December 1995. He was ordained a bishop on 6 January 1996 and succeeded to the position of ordinary of the diocese on 3 March 1997 at the age of 48. The Principal Consecrator was Pope John Paul II; his Principal Co-Consecrators were Cardinals Giovanni Battista Re and Jorge María Mejía. On 24 December 2007 Pope Benedict XVI named Bishop Burke as the new Archbishop of Benin City, also in Nigeria.

The Pope accepted Burke's resignation as Archbishop on 31 May 2010, after allegations of sexual abuse of an initially 14-year-old girl over the course of 20 years. Burke claimed he and his accuser had only had adult consensual sex. St Patrick's Missionary Society claimed its own investigation "found no evidence to corroborate the allegation of child sexual abuse". The alleged victim repeated her claims in "Mission to Prey", a documentary broadcast by RTÉ in 2011. (RTÉ was censured and paid damages to Kevin Reynolds, an Irish priest falsely accused in the programme of child rape in Kenya). In 2015 Burke sued RTÉ for libel in relation to the 2011 broadcast. Burke admitted having sex with numerous women, including a married mother of eight, but denied any underage or non-consensual relations. RTÉ settled out of court, claiming to have paid part of Burke's costs but no damages.
