= Joseph J. Tyson =

American Catholic prelate

His Excellency, The Most Reverend Joseph Jude Tyson
- Bishop of Yakima
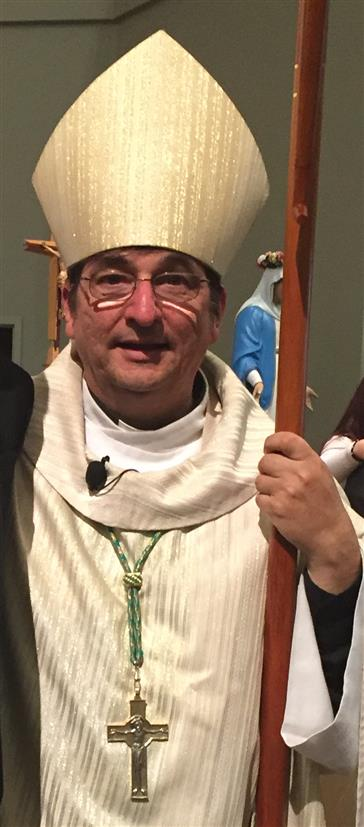
- Diocese: Yakima
- Appointed: April 12, 2011
- Installed: May 31, 2011
- Predecessor: Carlos Arthur Sevilla, S.J.
- Previous post: Auxiliary Bishop of Seattle and Titular Bishop of Migirpa (2005–2011)

Orders
- Ordination: June 10, 1989 by Raymond Hunthausen
- Consecration: June 6, 2005 by Alexander Joseph Brunett, George Leo Thomas, and Gustavo García-Siller

Personal details
- Born: October 16, 1957 (age 68) Moses Lake, Washington, US
- Education: Shoreline Community College; University of Washington; Catholic University of America
- Motto: Christo lumen ad gentes (Christ is a light to the gentiles)

Styles of Joseph Jude Tyson
- Reference style: His Excellency; The Most Reverend
- Spoken style: Your Excellency
- Religious style: Bishop

Joseph Jude Tyson (born October 16, 1957) is an American Catholic prelate who has served as Bishop of Yakima since 2011. He previously served as an auxiliary bishop for the Archdiocese of Seattle from 2005 to 2011.

== Biography ==
=== Early life ===
Joseph Tyson was born on October 16, 1957, in Moses Lake, Washington, and attended Blessed Sacrament Parish School in Seattle. He then entered St. Alphonsus Elementary School in Seattle in 1971 and graduated from Bishop Blanchet High School in Seattle in 1975.

Tyson then studied at Shoreline Community College in Shoreline, Washington, and the University of Washington (UW) in Seattle. He obtained in 1980 a Bachelor of Arts degree in Russian and Eastern European area studies and a Bachelor of Arts degree in editorial journalism. Tyson earned a Master of International Relations degree from the Jackson School of International Studies at the UW in 1984.

Having decided to become a priest, Tyson traveled to Washington, D.C. to enter the Catholic University of America (CUA). He was awarded a Master of Divinity degree from the CUA Theological College in 1989.

=== Priesthood ===
Tyson was ordained to the priesthood for the Archdiocese of Seattle on June 10, 1989 by Archbishop Raymond Hunthausen at St. James Cathedral in Seattle. After his 1989 ordination, the archdiocese assigned Tyson as parochial vicar of the St. James Cathedral Parish. He left St. James to serve as pastor at the following parishes in Washington State:

- St. Mary of the Valley in Monroe (1993 to 1996)
- St. Edward, St. George and of St. Paul in Seattle (1996 to 2005)

In addition to his pastoral assignments, Tyson assisted chancery offices in the area of permanent deacon formation, parish experiences for seminarians, vocations, and communications.

=== Auxiliary Bishop of Seattle ===
On May 12, 2005, Tyson was appointed auxiliary bishop of the Archdiocese of Seattle and titular bishop of Migirpa by Pope Benedict XVI.He received his episcopal consecration on June 6 2005 from Archbishop Alexander Brunett at St. James Cathedral, with Bishops George Thomas and Gustavo Garcia-Siller, serving as co-consecrators. Tyson selected as his episcopal motto: "Christo Lumen ad Gentes."

Tyson became interim superintendent of Seattle Catholic schools on July 1, 2008. He is a devoted cyclist, even receiving news of his episcopal appointment while riding his bike.

=== Bishop of Yakima ===
On April 12, 2011, Benedict XVI appointed Tyson as the seventh bishop of Yakima, replacing Bishop Carlos Sevilla. Tyson was installed on May 31, 2011, at Holy Family Parish in Yakima, Washington.

In addition to his native English, Tyson speaks Spanish, German, Vietnamese, and Serbo-Croatian.

== Viewpoints ==
=== Climate change ===
In 2023 article, Tyson discussed how a hotter climate has affected the health of farm workers and farming practices used by growers.

=== LGBTQ ===
In 2007, Tyson testified at a Washington State Legislature hearing on a proposed Washington initiative to offer domestic partnership benefits to same-sex couples; he promoted broadening its provisions, a controversial strategy used elsewhere by the Catholic Church, extending the definition of partnership to relationships beyond that of unmarried couples, to prevent discrimination against an elderly parent, a sibling, housemate or another in residence thus limiting its potential affirmative impact for gay rights, consistent with the Catholic Church's long-standing position.

== See also ==
- Catholic Church hierarchy
- Catholic Church in the United States
- Historical list of the Catholic bishops of the United States
- List of Catholic bishops of the United States
- Lists of patriarchs, archbishops, and bishops

== Episcopal succession ==
Catholic Church titles
Preceded by Carlos Arthur Sevilla	Bishop of Yakima; 2011-Present	Succeeded by Incumbent
Preceded by -	Auxiliary Bishop of Seattle; 2005–2011	Succeeded by -
