= Archdiocese of Benin City =

Roman Catholic archdiocese in Edo State, Nigeria

Archdiocese of Benin City Archidioecesis Urbis Beninensis

Location
- Country: Nigeria
- Territory: Edo State
- Coordinates: 6°20′27.5111″N 5°37′31.6146″E

Statistics
- Area: 10,863 km^{2} (4,194 sq mi)
- Population: Total; Catholics: (as of 2022); 1,985,470; 156,400 (7.9%)
- Parishes: 94

Information
- Denomination: Roman Catholic
- Rite: Latin Rite
- Cathedral: Holy Cross Cathedral, Benin City
- Secular priests: 173

Current leadership
- Pope: Leo XIV
- Archbishop: Sede vacante
- Suffragans: Auchi, Bomadi, Issele-Uku, Uromi, Warri
- Bishops emeritus: Richard Anthony Burke, S.P.S.

Map
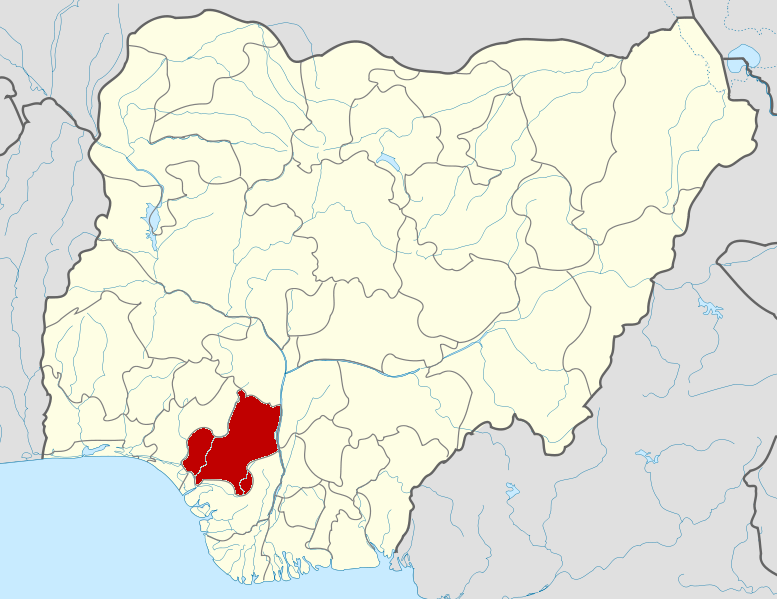
- Edo State map shown in red

Website
- archdiocese of benin city

The Roman Catholic Archdiocese of Benin City is the Metropolitan See for the ecclesiastical province of Benin City in Nigeria.

== History ==
- 1884.05.02: Established as Apostolic Prefecture of Upper Niger from the Apostolic Vicariate of Two Guineas in Gabon
- 1911.08.24: Renamed as Apostolic Prefecture of Western Nigeria
- 1918.08.24: Promoted as Apostolic Vicariate of Western Nigeria
- 1943.01.12: Renamed as Apostolic Vicariate of Asaba-Benin
- 1950.04.18: Promoted as Diocese of Benin City
- 1994.03.26: Promoted as Metropolitan Archdiocese of Benin City

== Special churches ==
The seat of the archbishop is Holy Cross Cathedral in Benin City.

== Bishops ==
- Prefect Apostolic of Western Nigeria (Roman rite)
  - Fr. Carlo Zappa, S.M.A. 1911 – 1917
- Vicars Apostolic of Western Nigeria (Roman rite)
  - Bishop Thomas Broderick, S.M.A. 1918.08.24 – 1933.10.13
  - Bishop Leo Hale Taylor, S.M.A. 1934.02.26 – 1939.06.13, appointed Vicar Apostolic of Costa di Benin; future Archbishop
- Vicar Apostolic of Asaba-Benin (Roman rite)
  - Bishop Patrick Joseph Kelly, S.M.A. 1939.12.11 – 1950.04.18 see below
- Bishops of Benin City (Roman rite)
  - Bishop Patrick Joseph Kelly, S.M.A. see above 1950.04.18 – 1973.07.05
  - Bishop Patrick Ebosele Ekpu 1973.07.05 – 1994.03.26 see below
- Metropolitan Archbishops of Benin City (Roman rite)
  - Archbishop Patrick Ebosele Ekpu see above 1994.03.26 – 2006.11.21
  - Archbishop Richard Anthony Burke, S.P.S 2007.12.24 - 2010.05.31
  - Archbishop Augustine Obiora Akubeze (2011.03.18 - 2026.07.09)

=== Coadjutor Bishop ===
- Patrick Ebosele Ekpu (1971-1973)

=== Another priest of this diocese who became bishop ===
- Gabriel Ghiakhomo Dunia, appointed Bishop of Auchi in 2002

== Suffragan Dioceses ==
- Auchi
- Bomadi
- Issele-Uku
- Uromi
- Warri

== See also ==
- Roman Catholicism in Nigeria

== Sources ==
- Catholic Bishops' Conference of Nigeria
- Official website of the Roman Catholic Archdiocese of Benin City
- GCatholic.org
- Catholic Hierarchy
- Fides News Agency Acta of the Holy See
- Catholic Secretariat of Nigeria page for Benin City
