= Felipe Tejeda García =

Mexican Roman Catholic bishop

Felipe Tejeda García, M.Sp.S. (21 January 1935 – 9 April 2018) was a Roman Catholic bishop.

Tejeda García was born in Mexico and was ordained to the priesthood in 1966. He served as titular bishop of Castabala and auxiliary bishop of the Roman Catholic Archdiocese of Mexico from 2000 to 2010.
