= Osmaniye =

- Municipality
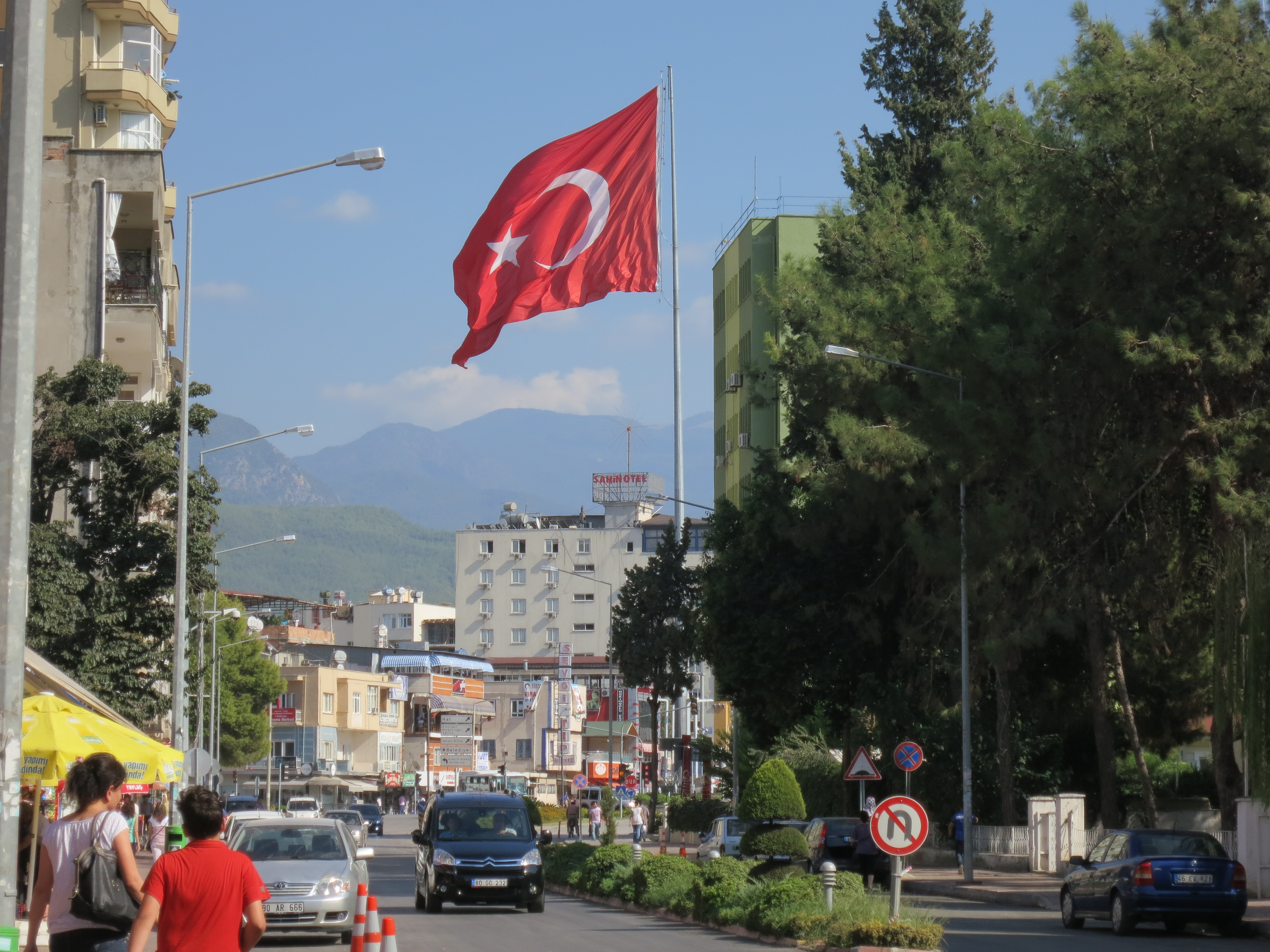
- Centre of Osmaniye

- Logo

- Location within Turkey
- Coordinates: 37°04′30″N 36°15′00″E
- Country: Turkey
- Province: Osmaniye
- District: Osmaniye

Government
  - Mayor: İbrahim Çenet (MHP)
- Population (2022): 252,186
- Time zone: UTC+3 (TRT)
- Postal code: 80000
- Area code: 0328
- Website: osmaniye-bld.gov.tr

Osmaniye (pronounced [osˈmaːnije]) is a city on the eastern edge of the Çukurova plain in southern Turkey. It is the seat of Osmaniye Province and Osmaniye District. Its population is 252,186 (2022).

Backed by the foothills of the Nur Mountains, Osmaniye lay on one of the old Silk Roads and was always a place of strategic importance since it straddled the main route between Anatolia and the Middle East.

Osmaniye lies at the centre of a rich agricultural region watered by the Ceyhan river and known for growing peanuts. During the intensely hot summers many residents escape either to the Mediterranean coast or into the Nur mountains. The yayla of Zorkun is a particularly popular mountain retreat.

Osmaniye is strongly associated with Devlet Bahçeli, the leader of the MHP, who was its member of parliament for many years.

== History ==
Although Osmaniye was probably ruled in turn by the Hittites, Persians, Byzantines and Armenians, there is nothing left to show their presence in the modern city.

An Islamic presence was first established by the Abbasid Caliph Harun al-Rashid, auxiliaries in his army being the first Turks to fight in Anatolia. They liked the area and following the Turkish victory over the Byzantines at Malazgirt in 1071 waves of Turkish conquest began. The Nur Mountains were settled by the Ulaşlı tribe of the Turkmens.

The Ulaşlı remained the dominant local power into the period of the Ottoman Empire and were even involved in the Celali uprisings, during a period of crisis for the Ottomans in the 17th century. Eventually, in 1865 the Ottoman general Derviş Paşa was charged with bringing law and order to the Çukurova. He established his headquarters in the Osmaniye villages of Dereobası, Fakıuşağı and Akyar and brought the Ulaşlı down from the mountains to the village of Hacıosmanlı. This eventually became the province of Osmaniye. It was named as Cebeli Bereket during the Ottoman period and was renamed after the formation of the Republic of Turkey in 1923.

Between 1924 and 1933 the city of Osmaniye was the capital of the province of the same name. However, in 1933 the province was abolished and Osmaniye became the district governorate for Adana province. Then in 1996 Osmaniye was reinstated as Turkey's 80th province with the city of Osmaniye as its capital. Since then it has received more investment for infrastructure and now feels more like a city than the market town of old.

== Local attractions ==
Osmaniye town has few attractions for visitors other than the city-centre Kent Müzesi (City Museum). However, it makes a good base for visiting the scant remains of the nearby Roman city of Hierapolis-Castabala which huddles at the base of a craggy rock with a castle, probably built by the Armenians, perched on top of it.

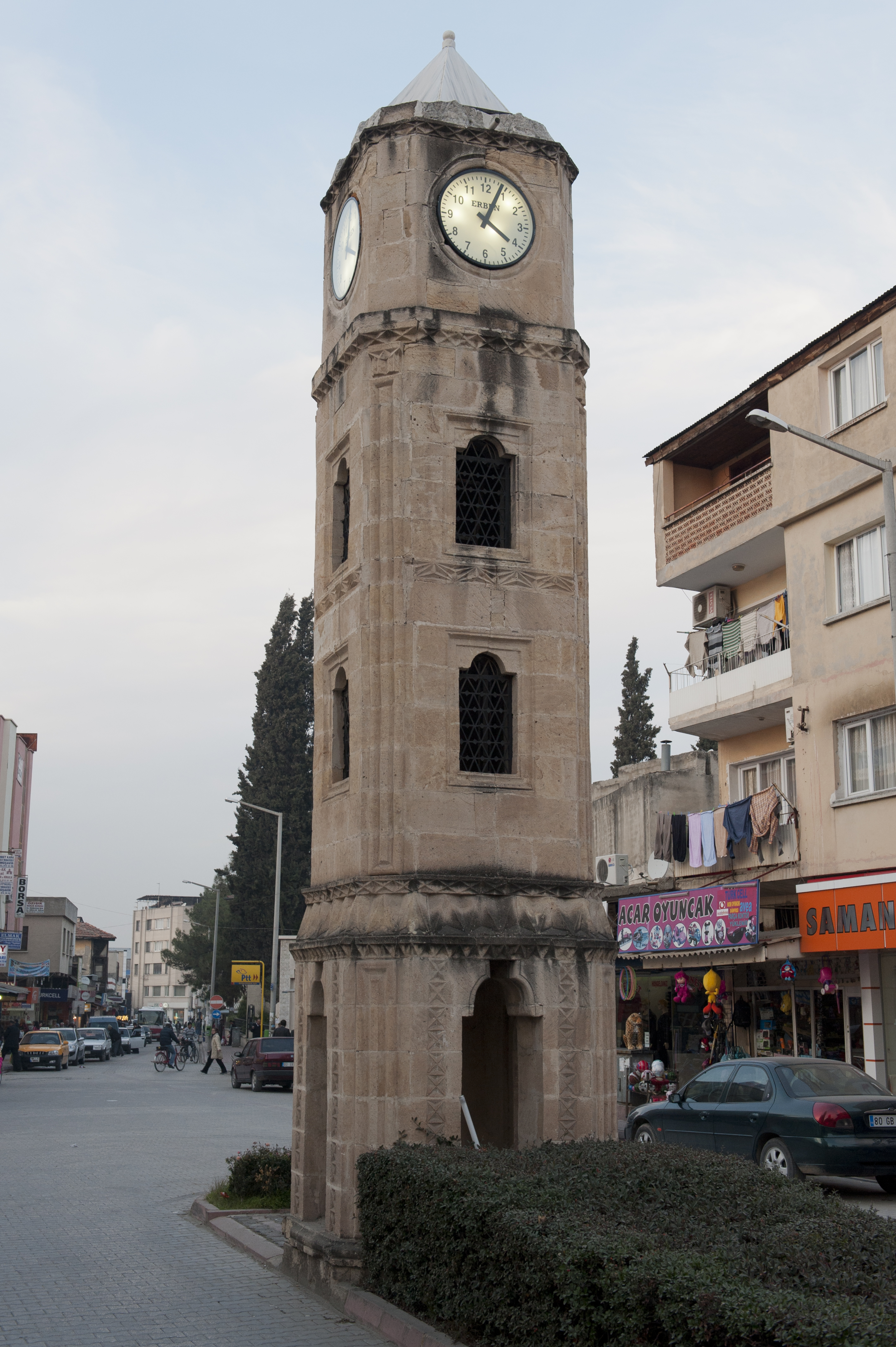
Osmaniye Clock Tower

== Climate ==
Köppen map of Osmaniye Province and surrounding regions:
- Csa
- Csb
- Dsa
- Dsb

Osmaniye has a Mediterranean climate (Köppen: Csa, Trewartha: Cs) with very hot, dry summers and mild, wet winters.

Highest recorded temperature: 45.6 °C (114.1 °F) on 13 August 2023
Lowest recorded temperature: −8.5 °C (16.7 °F) on 4 January 1989

Climate data for Osmaniye (1991–2020, extremes 1987–present)
Month	Jan	Feb	Mar	Apr	May	Jun	Jul	Aug	Sep	Oct	Nov	Dec	Year
Record high °C (°F)	24.9 (76.8)	28.0 (82.4)	33.8 (92.8)	36.5 (97.7)	41.7 (107.1)	42.6 (108.7)	42.8 (109.0)	45.6 (114.1)	45.0 (113.0)	38.4 (101.1)	33.3 (91.9)	29.0 (84.2)	45.6 (114.1)
Mean daily maximum °C (°F)	14.5 (58.1)	16.0 (60.8)	19.3 (66.7)	23.3 (73.9)	27.7 (81.9)	31.3 (88.3)	33.4 (92.1)	34.3 (93.7)	32.2 (90.0)	28.4 (83.1)	21.8 (71.2)	16.1 (61.0)	24.9 (76.8)
Daily mean °C (°F)	8.8 (47.8)	10.1 (50.2)	13.2 (55.8)	17.0 (62.6)	21.3 (70.3)	25.2 (77.4)	27.9 (82.2)	28.6 (83.5)	25.7 (78.3)	21.2 (70.2)	14.6 (58.3)	10.1 (50.2)	18.6 (65.5)
Mean daily minimum °C (°F)	3.8 (38.8)	4.7 (40.5)	7.5 (45.5)	11.0 (51.8)	15.1 (59.2)	19.1 (66.4)	22.6 (72.7)	23.3 (73.9)	19.6 (67.3)	14.6 (58.3)	8.4 (47.1)	5.1 (41.2)	12.9 (55.2)
Record low °C (°F)	−8.5 (16.7)	−6.8 (19.8)	−4.0 (24.8)	0.1 (32.2)	4.6 (40.3)	11.5 (52.7)	15.0 (59.0)	15.0 (59.0)	7.8 (46.0)	4.1 (39.4)	−4.5 (23.9)	−5.4 (22.3)	−8.5 (16.7)
Average precipitation mm (inches)	106.5 (4.19)	99.8 (3.93)	116.9 (4.60)	87.2 (3.43)	74.2 (2.92)	42.4 (1.67)	19.8 (0.78)	10.7 (0.42)	34.6 (1.36)	68.1 (2.68)	86.6 (3.41)	93.0 (3.66)	839.8 (33.06)
Average precipitation days	9.87	9.57	10.63	10.33	7.63	3.3	1.6	1.37	3.43	6.57	6.73	9.23	80.3
Average relative humidity (%)	64.9	63.0	63.9	64.5	63.6	62.9	66.4	65.2	60.8	59.3	61.5	66.5	63.6
Mean monthly sunshine hours	99.2	98.9	139.5	162.0	210.8	228.0	238.7	226.3	207.0	164.3	114.0	99.2	1,987.9
Mean daily sunshine hours	3.2	3.5	4.5	5.4	6.8	7.6	7.7	7.3	6.9	5.3	3.8	3.2	5.6
Source 1: Turkish State Meteorological Service
Source 2: NOAA (humidity)

== Notable Peoples ==
- Ümit Besen, singer
- Devlet Bahçeli, politician
- Ruhi Ersoy, politician
- Derya Yanık, politician
- Samet Aybaba, football manager
- Adnan Aybaba, football commentator and former player

== Mayors of Osmaniye ==
- 1999-2004 Memili Kırkkanat MHP
- 2004-2009 Davut Çuhadar AK Party
- 2009-2024 Kadir Kara MHP
- 2024-present İbrahim Çenet MHP
