= List of municipalities in Çukurova =

This is a list of municipalities in the Çukurova region of Turkey. Note that the central municipalities of Adana, Hatay and Mersin Provinces are Metropolitan Municipality, without any belde (town) municipality,

Adana Province

- Adana Metropolitan Municipality
- Çukurova (in Adana)
- Karaisalı (in Adana)
- Sarıçam (in Adana)
- Seyhan (in Adana)
- Yüreğir (in Adana)
- Aladağ
- Ceyhan
- Feke
- İmamoğlu
- Karaisalı
- Karataş
- Kozan
- Pozantı
- Saimbeyli
- Tufanbeyli
- Yumurtalık

Hatay Province

- Hatay Metropolitan Municipality
- Antakya (in Antakya)
- Defne (in Antakya)
- Belen
- Dörtyol
- Erzin
- Hassa
- İskenderun
- Kırıkhan
- Kumlu
- Payas
- Reyhanlı
- Samandağ
- Yayladağı

Mersin Province

- Mersin Metropolitan Municipality
- Akdeniz (in Mersin)
- Mezitli (in Mersin)
- Toroslar (in Mersin)
- Yenişehir (in Mersin)
- Anamur
- Aydıncık
- Bozyazı
- Çamlıyayla
- Erdemli
- Gülnar
- Mut
- Silifke
- Tarsus

Osmaniye Province

- Osmaniye
- Bahçe
- Düziçi
- Hasanbeyli
- Kadirli
- Sumbas
- Toprakkale
- Atalan (belde)
- Böcekli (belde)
- Ellek (belde)
- Yarbaşı (belde)
- Cevdetiye (belde)
- Kırmıtlı (belde)
- Alibeyli (belde)
- Mehmetli (belde)
- Tüysüz (belde)

== See also ==
- List of municipalities in Adana Province
- List of municipalities in Hatay Province
- List of municipalities in Mersin Province
- List of municipalities in Osmaniye Province
