= List of populated places in Osmaniye Province =

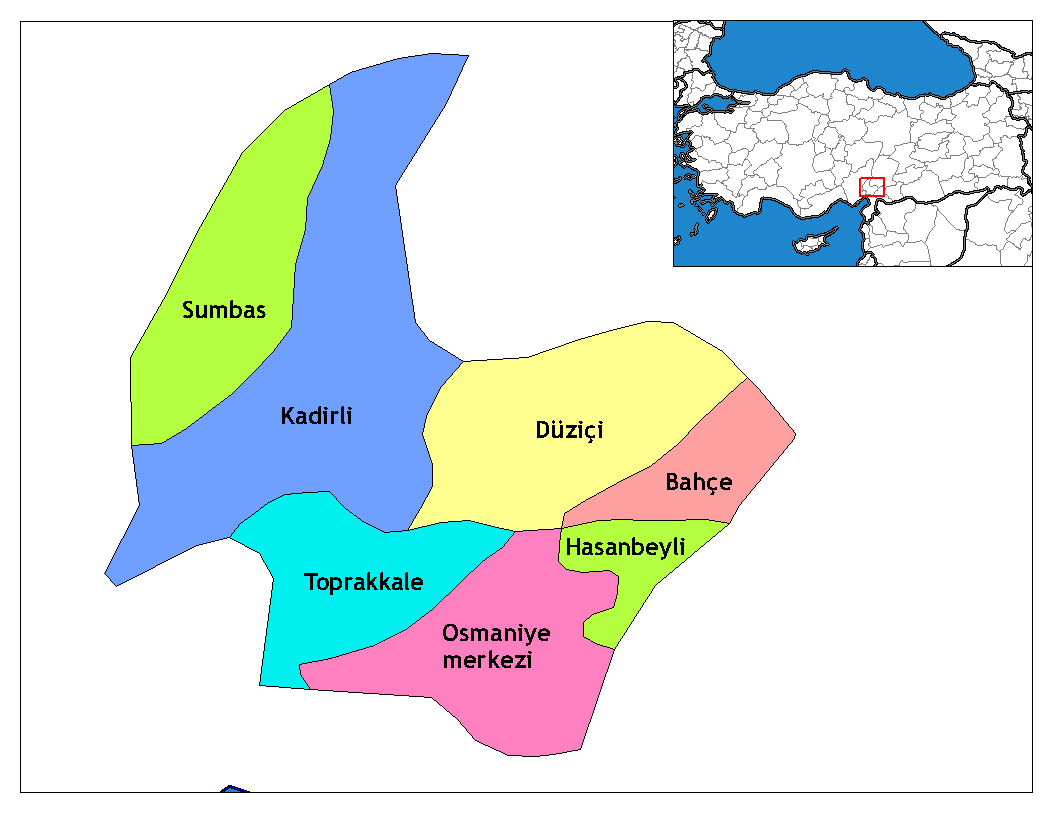
Osmaniye Province

Below is the list of populated places in Osmaniye Province, Turkey by the districts. In the following lists first place in each list is the administrative center of the district.

== Osmaniye ==
- Osmaniye
- Akyar, Osmaniye
- Alahanlı, Osmaniye
- Arslanlı, Osmaniye
- Bahçe, Osmaniye
- Cevdetiye, Osmaniye
- Çağşak, Osmaniye
- Çardak, Osmaniye
- Çona, Osmaniye
- Değirmenocağı, Osmaniye
- Dereli, Osmaniye
- Dereobası, Osmaniye
- Dervişli, Osmaniye
- Gökçedam, Osmaniye
- Issızca, Osmaniye
- Karacalar, Osmaniye
- Karataş, Osmaniye
- Kayalı, Osmaniye
- Kazmaca, Osmaniye
- Kesmeburun, Osmaniye
- Kırıklı, Osmaniye
- Kırmacılı, Osmaniye
- Kırmıtlı, Osmaniye
- Koçyurdu, Osmaniye
- Köyyeri, Osmaniye
- Kumarlı, Osmaniye
- Küllü, Osmaniye
- Nohuttepe, Osmaniye
- Orhaniye, Osmaniye
- Oruçgazi, Osmaniye
- Sakarcalık, Osmaniye
- Sarpınağzı, Osmaniye
- Selimiye, Osmaniye
- Serdar, Osmaniye
- Serinova, Osmaniye
- Şekerdere, Osmaniye
- Tehçi, Osmaniye
- Yarpuz, Osmaniye
- Yeniköy, Osmaniye

== Bahçe ==
- Bahçe
- Arıcaklı, Bahçe
- Arıklıkaş, Bahçe
- Aşağıarıcaklı, Bahçe
- Aşağıkardere, Bahçe
- Bekdemir, Bahçe
- Burgaçlı, Bahçe
- Gökmustafalı, Bahçe
- İnderesi, Bahçe
- Kaman, Bahçe
- Kızlaç, Bahçe
- Nohut, Bahçe
- Örencik, Bahçe
- Savranlı, Bahçe
- Yaylalık, Bahçe
- Yukarıkardere, Bahçe

== Düziçi ==
- Düziçi
- Akçakoyunlu, Düziçi
- Alibozlu, Düziçi
- Atalan, Düziçi
- Bayındırlı, Düziçi
- Bostanlar, Düziçi
- Böcekli, Düziçi
- Çamiçi, Düziçi
- Çatak, Düziçi
- Çerçioğlu, Düziçi
- Çitli, Düziçi
- Çotlu, Düziçi
- Elbeyli, Düziçi
- Ellek, Düziçi
- Farsak, Düziçi
- Gökçayır, Düziçi
- Gümüş, Düziçi
- Güzelyurt, Düziçi
- Karagedik, Düziçi
- Karaguz, Düziçi
- Kuşcu, Düziçi
- Oluklu, Düziçi
- Pirsultanlı, Düziçi
- Selverler, Düziçi
- Söğütlügöl, Düziçi
- Yarbaşı, Düziçi
- Yazlamazlı, Düziçi
- Yenifarsak, Düziçi
- Yeşildere, Düziçi
- Yeşilköy, Düziçi
- Yeşilyurt, Düziçi

== Hasanbeyli ==
- Hasanbeyli
- Çolaklı, Hasanbeyli
- Çulhalı, Hasanbeyli
- Kalecik, Hasanbeyli
- Karayiğit, Hasanbeyli
- Sarayova, Hasanbeyli
- Yanıkkışla, Hasanbeyli

== Kadirli ==
- Kadirli
- Akköprü, Kadirli
- Akova, Kadirli
- Anberinarkı, Kadirli
- Aşağıbozkuyu, Kadirli
- Aşağıçiyanlı, Kadirli
- Aydınlar, Kadirli
- Azaplı, Kadirli
- Bahadırlı, Kadirli
- Bekereci, Kadirli
- Coşkunlar, Kadirli
- Çaygeçit, Kadirli
- Çığcık, Kadirli
- Çınar, Kadirli
- Çiğdemli, Kadirli
- Çukurköprü, Kadirli
- Değirmendere, Kadirli
- Durmuşsofular, Kadirli
- Erdoğdu, Kadirli
- Göztaşı, Kadirli
- Hacıhaliloğlu, Kadirli
- Halitağalar, Kadirli
- Hardallık, Kadirli
- Harkaştığı, Kadirli
- İlbistanlı, Kadirli
- Kabayar, Kadirli
- Karabacak, Kadirli
- Karakütük, Kadirli
- Karatepe, Kadirli
- Kayasuyu, Kadirli
- Kerimli, Kadirli
- Kesikkeli, Kadirli
- Kesim, Kadirli
- Kızyusuflu, Kadirli
- Kiremitli, Kadirli
- Koçlu, Kadirli
- Kösepınarı, Kadirli
- Kümbet, Kadirli
- Mecidiye, Kadirli
- Mehedinli, Kadirli
- Mezretli, Kadirli
- Narlıkışla, Kadirli
- Oruçbey, Kadirli
- Öksüzlü, Kadirli
- Sarıtanışmanlı, Kadirli
- Sofular, Kadirli
- Söğütlüdere, Kadirli
- Şabaplı, Kadirli
- Tahta, Kadirli
- Tatarlı, Kadirli
- Tekeli, Kadirli
- Topraktepe, Kadirli
- Tozlu, Kadirli
- Vayvaylı, Kadirli
- Yalnızdut, Kadirli
- Yenigün, Kadirli
- Yeniköy, Kadirli
- Yoğunoluk, Kadirli
- Yukarıbozkuyu, Kadirli
- Yukarıçiyanlı, Kadirli
- Yusufizzettin, Kadirli

== Sumbas ==
- Sumbas
- Akçataş, Sumbas
- Akdam, Sumbas
- Alibeyli, Sumbas
- Armağanlı, Sumbas
- Çiçeklidere, Sumbas
- Esenli, Sumbas
- Gafarlı, Sumbas
- Hüyük, Sumbas
- Kızılömerli, Sumbas
- Köseli, Sumbas
- Küçükçınar, Sumbas
- Mehmetli, Sumbas
- Reşadiye, Sumbas
- Yazıboyu, Sumbas
- Yeşilyayla, Sumbas

== Toprakkale ==
- Toprakkale
- Arslanpınarı, Toprakkale
- Büyüktüysüz, Toprakkale
- Lalegölü, Toprakkale
- Sazlık, Toprakkale
- Sayhüyük, Toprakkale
- Tüysüz, Toprakkale
