= List of municipalities in Osmaniye Province =

This is the List of municipalities in Osmaniye Province, Turkey as of March 2023.

District	Municipality
Bahçe	Bahçe
Düziçi	Atalan
Düziçi	Böcekli
Düziçi	Düziçi
Düziçi	Ellek
Düziçi	Yarbaşı
Hasanbeyli	Hasanbeyli
Kadirli	Kadirli
Osmaniye	Cevdetiye
Osmaniye	Osmaniye
Sumbas	Mehmetli
Sumbas	Sumbas
Toprakkale	Toprakkale
Toprakkale	Türkmen
