= List of yaylas in Turkey =

Yayla is the Turkish for yaylak. In the table below, some of the famous yaylas are listed (in geographical order):

Name	Region	Province	District
İbradı	Mediterranean	Antalya Province	İbradı
Yeşilöz	Mediterranean	Antalya Province	Alanya
Abanoz	Mediterranean	Mersin Province	Anamur
Balandız	Mediterranean	Mersin Province	Silifke
Sorgun	Mediterranean	Mersin Province	Erdemli
Fındıkpınarı	Mediterranean	Mersin Province	Mersin
Gözne	Mediterranean	Mersin Province	Mersin
Güzelyayla	Mediterranean	Mersin Province	Mersin
Gülek	Mediterranean	Mersin Province	Tarsus
Çamlıyayla	Mediterranean	Mersin Province	Çamlıyayla
Akçatekir	Mediterranean	Adana Province	Pozantı
Pozantı	Mediterranean	Adana Province	Pozantı
Horzum	Mediterranean	Adana Province	Kozan
Göller	Mediterranean	Adana Province	Kozan
Tapan	Mediterranean	Adana Province	Feke
Zorkun	Mediterranean	Osmaniye Province	Osmaniye
Belen	Mediterranean	Hatay Province	Belen
Soğukoluk	Mediterranean	Hatay Province	Belen
Anzer	Black Sea	Rize Province	İkizdere
Ayder	Black Sea	Rize Province	Çamlıhemşin
Uzungöl	Black Sea	Trabzon Province	Çaykara
Çambaşı	Black Sea	Ordu Province	Kabadüz
Boraboy	Black Sea	Amasya Province	Taşova
Gölcük	Aegean	İzmir Province	Ödemiş
