= Akyar =

Akyar may refer to:

- Akyar, Turkish name of Strovilia, a village in Northern Cyprus
- Akyar, Turkish name of Sevastopol, a major city in Crimea
- Akyar, Russia, several rural localities in Russia
- Akyar, Bigadiç, a populated place in Balıkesir Province, Turkey
- Akyar, Gercüş, a village in Batman Province, Turkey
- Akyar, Korkuteli, a village in Antalya Province, Turkey
- Akyar, Osmaniye, a populated place in Osmaniye Province, Turkey
- Akyar, Tavas, a populated place in Denizli Province, Turkey
- Akyar Dam, a dam in Ankara Province, Turkey, built between 1996 and 2001
