= Akçataş, Osmaniye =

Akçataş
- Village
- Location within Turkey
- Coordinates: 37°27′02″N 35°56′05″E
- Country: Turkey
- Province: Osmaniye
- District: Sumbas
- Elevation: 37 m (121 ft)
- Population (2023): 795
- Time zone: UTC+3 (TRT)
- Postal code: 80902
- Area code: 0328

Akçataş is a village in the Sumbas District of Osmaniye Province, Turkey. The village is located 70 km from the provincial capital of Osmaniye and 15 km from the district center of Sumbas.

== History ==
The village's name was recorded as Setir or Sitir in 1925. Previously part of the Kadirli district, it was transferred to the Sumbas district on October 28, 1996.

== Population ==
Historical population
Year	Pop.	±% p.a.
1985	1,153	—
1990	1,384	+3.72%
1997	1,052	−3.84%
2007	990	−0.61%
2012	932	−1.20%
2017	852	−1.78%
2023	795	−1.15%
Source: Population censuses (1985-1997) and TÜİK (2007-2023)
