= Balandız =

Balandız Gümüşlü
- Neighbourhood
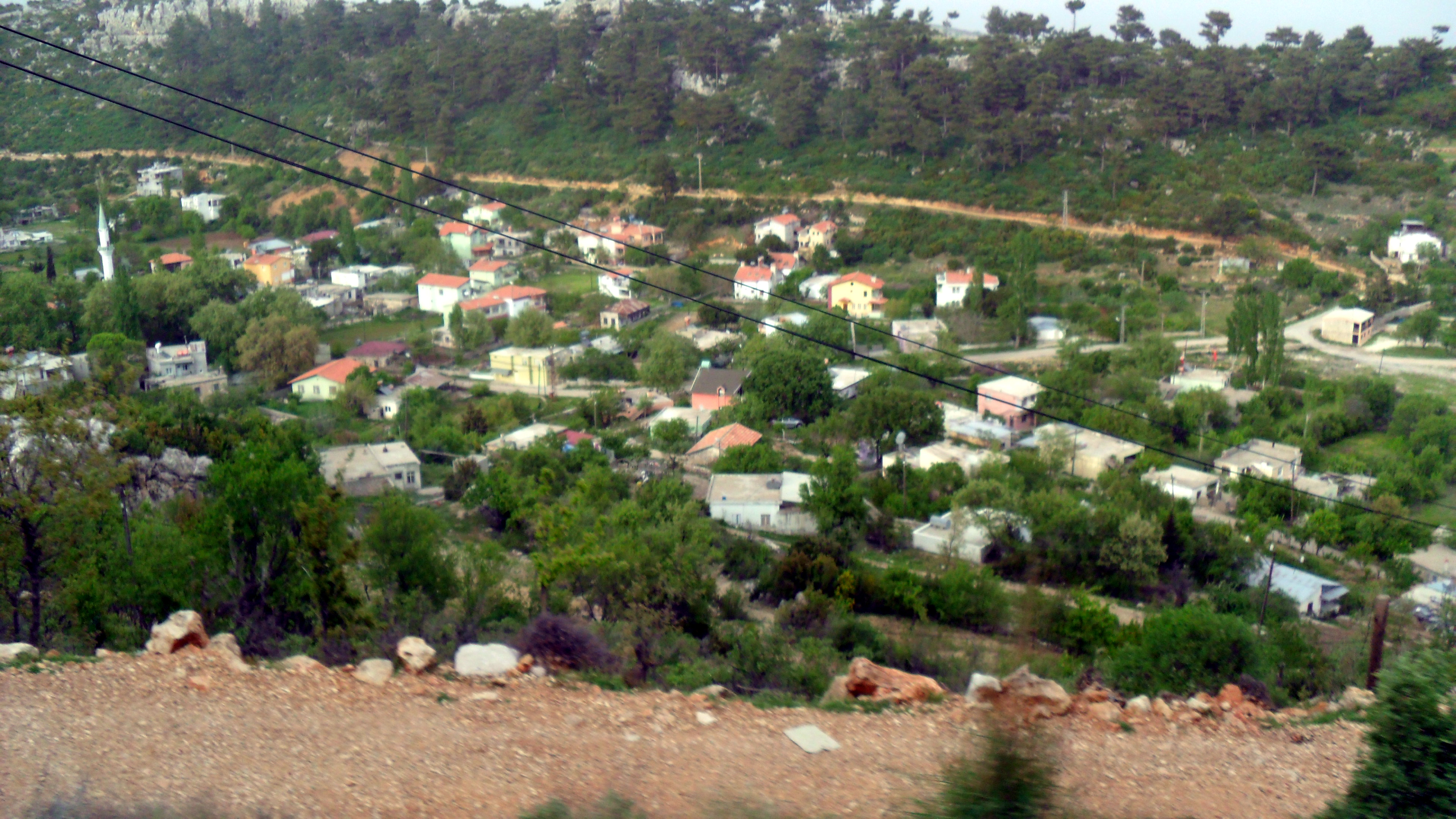

- Location within Turkey
- Coordinates: 36°21′N 33°44′E
- Country: Turkey
- Province: Mersin
- District: Silifke
- Elevation: 920 m (3,020 ft)
- Population (2022): 170
- Time zone: UTC+3 (TRT)
- Postal code: 33940
- Area code: 0324

Balandız (Gümüşlü) is a neighbourhood in the municipality and district of Silifke, Mersin Province, Turkey. Its population is 170 (2022). It is situated in the Taurus Mountains. It is 22 kilometres (14 mi) from Silifke and 105 kilometres (65 mi) from Mersin. Balandız is an agricultural village. But during summers it is also a yayla (resort). Now an unused building is under renovation to be put into service as a village museum and a library.
