= Türkmen, Toprakkale =

Türkmen
- Municipality
- Location in Turkey
- Coordinates: 37°03′07″N 36°05′39″E
- Country: Turkey
- Province: Osmaniye
- District: Toprakkale
- Population (2022): 7,090
- Time zone: UTC+3 (TRT)

Türkmen is a town (belde) in the Toprakkale District, Osmaniye Province, Turkey. Its population is 7,090 (2022).
