= Ala Mosque =

Mosque in Kadirli, Osmaniye, Turkey

- Ala Camii
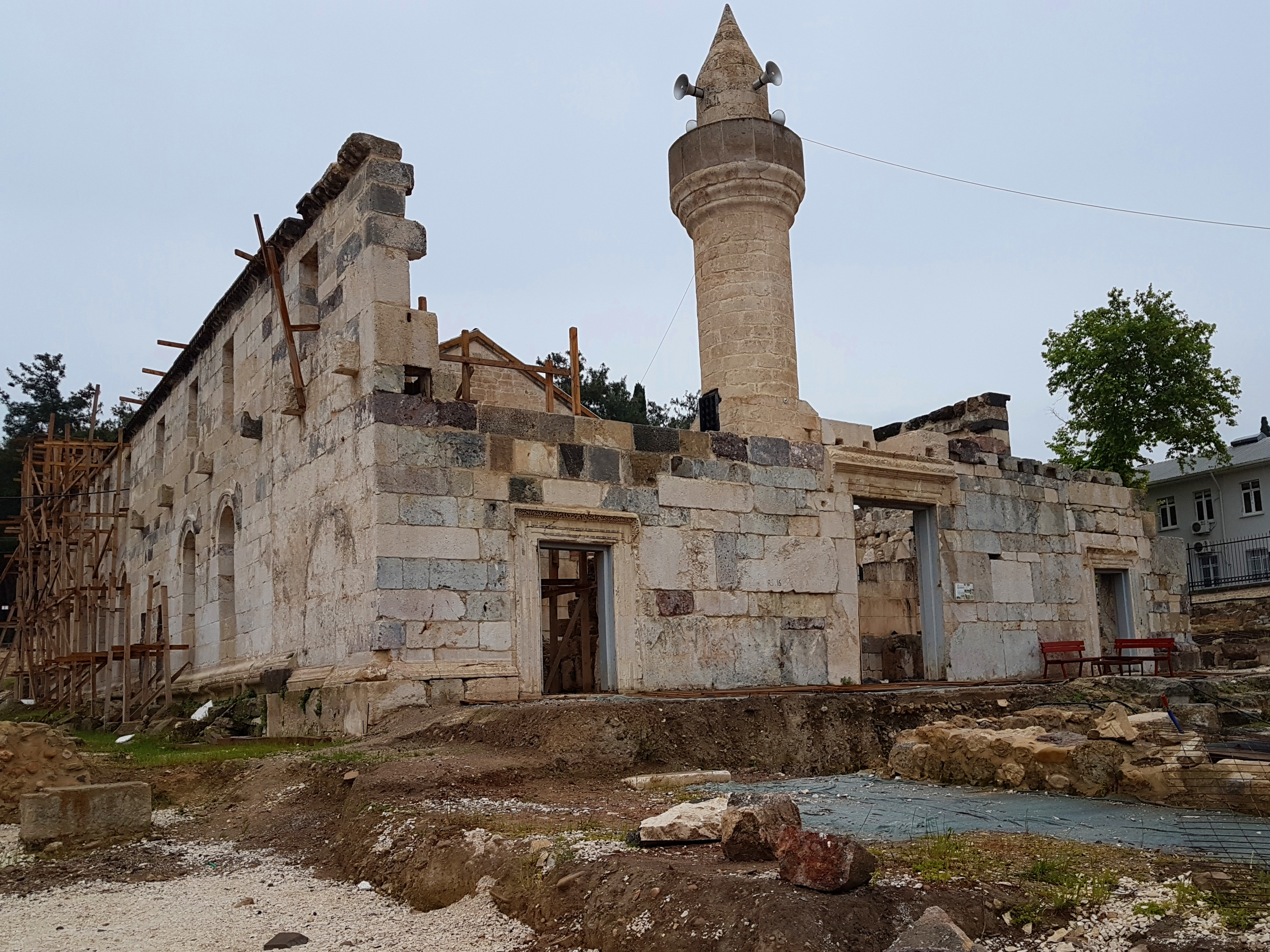

- Location within Turkey

Religion
- Affiliation: Islam
- Branch/tradition: Sunni

Location
- Municipality: Kadirli
- State: Osmaniye
- Country: Turkey
- Interactive map of Ala Mosque
- Coordinates: 37.3731°N 36.1028°E

Architecture
- Type: mosque
- Established: 1489
- Completed: 5th century

Specifications
- Length: 33 m
- Width: 19.5 m
- Minaret: 1

Ala Mosque (Turkish: Ala Camisi) is a historical mosque in Kadirli, Osmaniye Province, Turkey.

Ala Mosque is in Kadirli ilçe (district) of Osmaniye Province. There is a Roman necropolis to the east of the mosque.

It was a Byzantine church and monastery built in the 5th century. After the city was captured by Kasım Bey of Dulkadirids in 1489, it was converted into a mosque and a madrasa. A mimbar and a minaret were added by the Dulkarids. It was initially named Alaüddevle Mescit after Kasım Bey's father Alaüddevle Bozkurt. Later, the name was shortened to "Ala". During the 19th century, Ala Mosque was used as an Ottoman Army depot, and after 1865 it was restored as a mosque. In 1924, during the Turkish Republic era, it was abandoned. Beginning by 2012, the building underwent a restoration. Which was finished in July 2020.

According to Richard Batliss, the dimensions of the original building was 33 m × 19.5 m (108 ft × 64 ft).
