= Akyar, Russia =

Akyar (Russian: Акъяр) is the name of several rural localities in the Republic of Bashkortostan, Russia:

- Akyar, Khaybullinsky District, Republic of Bashkortostan, a selo in Akyarsky Selsoviet of Khaybullinsky District
- Akyar, Miyakinsky District, Republic of Bashkortostan, a village in Kacheganovsky Selsoviet of Miyakinsky District
