= Düziçi District =

District of Osmaniye Province, Turkey

- District
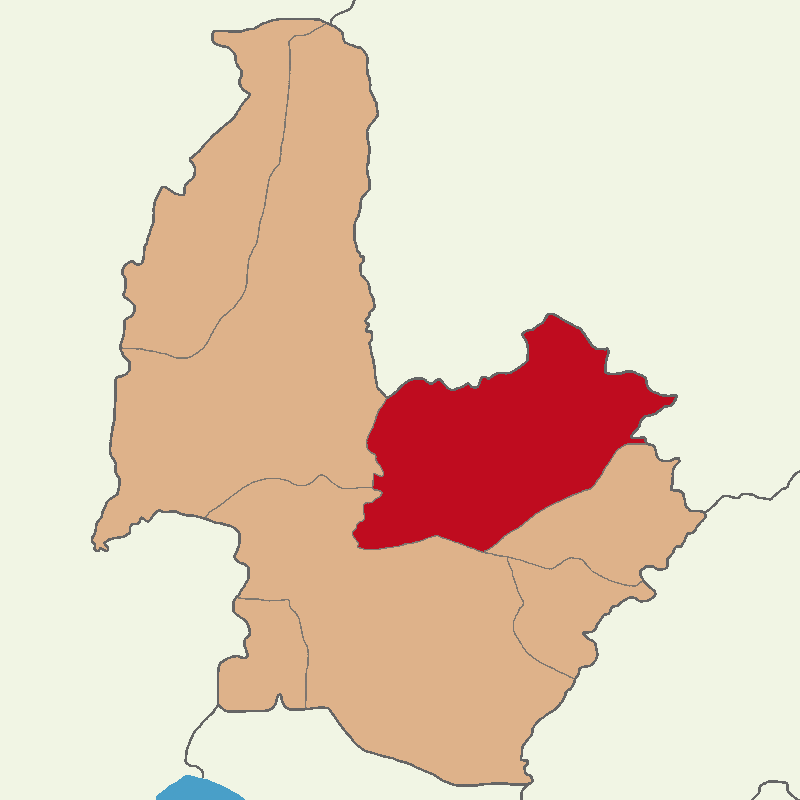
- Map showing Düziçi District in Osmaniye Province

- Location in Turkey
- Coordinates: 37°15′N 36°27′E
- Country: Turkey
- Province: Osmaniye
- Seat: Düziçi

Government
  - Kaymakam: Turgay İlhan
- Area: 595 km^{2} (230 sq mi)
- Population (2022): 85,448
  - Density: 140/km^{2} (370/sq mi)
- Time zone: UTC+3 (TRT)
- Website: www.duzici.gov.tr

Düziçi District is a district of the Osmaniye Province of Turkey. Its seat is the town of Düziçi. Its area is 595 km^{2}, and its population is 85,448 (2022). Düziçi is a farming district, growing peanuts, corn and wheat, irrigated by Berke reservoir.

== Composition ==
There are five municipalities in Düziçi District:

- Atalan
- Böcekli
- Düziçi
- Ellek
- Yarbaşı

There are 25 villages in Düziçi District:

- Akçakoyunlu
- Alibozlu
- Bayındırlı
- Bostanlar
- Çatak
- Çerçioğlu
- Çitli
- Çotlu
- Elbeyli
- Farsak
- Gökçayır
- Gümüş
- Güzelyurt
- Karagedik
- Karaguz
- Kuşçu
- Oluklu
- Pirsultanlı
- Selverler
- Söğütlügöl
- Yazlamazlı
- Yenifarsak
- Yeşildere
- Yeşilköy
- Yeşilyurt
