= Toprakkale District =

District of Osmaniye Province, Turkey

- District
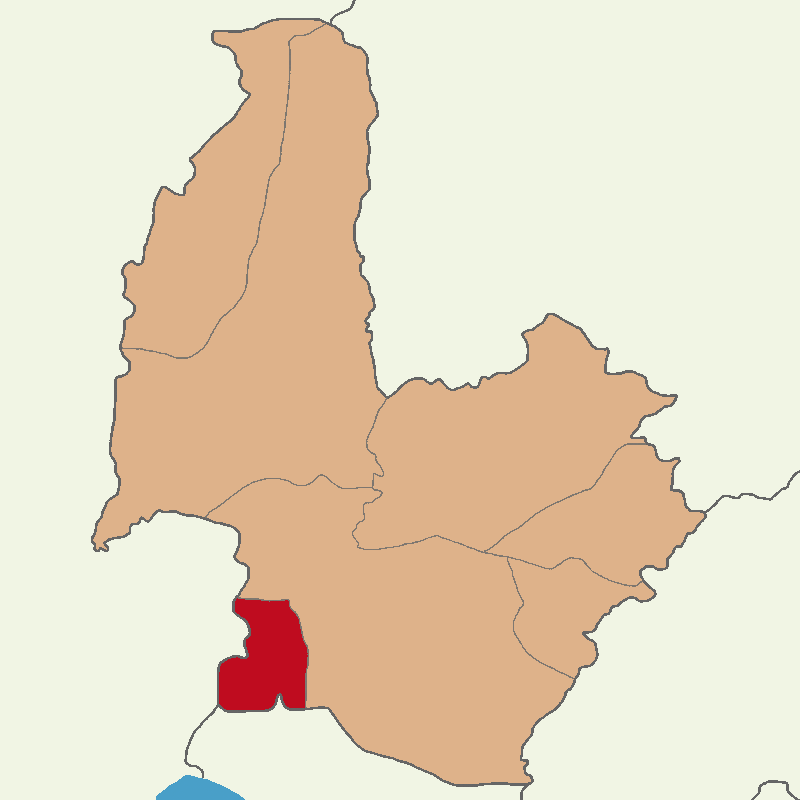
- Map showing Toprakkale District in Osmaniye Province

- Location in Turkey
- Coordinates: 37°04′N 36°09′E
- Country: Turkey
- Province: Osmaniye
- Seat: Toprakkale

Government
  - Kaymakam: Ali İhsan Selimoğlu
- Area: 112 km^{2} (43 sq mi)
- Population (2022): 20,674
  - Density: 180/km^{2} (480/sq mi)
- Time zone: UTC+3 (TRT)
- Website: www.toprakkale.gov.tr

Toprakkale District is a district of the Osmaniye Province of Turkey. Its seat is the town of Toprakkale. Its area is 112 km^{2}, and its population is 20,674 (2022).

== Composition ==
There are two municipalities in Toprakkale District:

- Toprakkale
- Türkmen

There are three villages in Toprakkale District:

- Aslanpınarı
- Lalegölü
- Sayhüyüğü
