= Hasanbeyli District =

District of Osmaniye Province, Turkey

- District
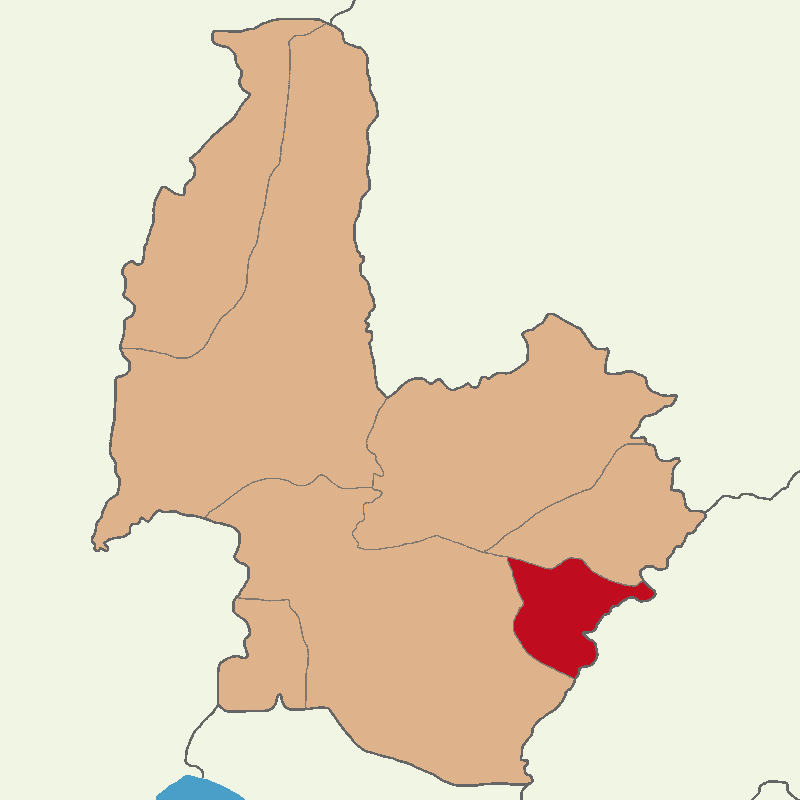
- Map showing Hasanbeyli District in Osmaniye Province

- Location in Turkey
- Coordinates: 37°08′N 36°33′E
- Country: Turkey
- Province: Osmaniye
- Seat: Hasanbeyli

Government
  - Kaymakam: Vekili Can Kurt
- Area: 168 km^{2} (65 sq mi)
- Population (2022): 4,816
  - Density: 29/km^{2} (74/sq mi)
- Time zone: UTC+3 (TRT)
- Website: www.hasanbeyli.gov.tr

Hasanbeyli District is a district of the Osmaniye Province of Turkey. Its seat is the town of Hasanbeyli. Its area is 168 square kilometres (65 sq mi), and its population is 4,816 (2022).

== Composition ==
There is one municipality in Hasanbeyli District:

- Hasanbeyli

There are six villages in Hasanbeyli District:

- Çolaklı
- Çulhalı
- Kalecik
- Karayiğit
- Sarayova
- Yanıkkışla
