= Sorgun, Erdemli =

Sorgun Büyüksorgun
- Neighbourhood
- Location in Turkey
- Coordinates: 36°52′N 34°08′E
- Country: Turkey
- Province: Mersin
- District: Erdemli
- Elevation: 1,380 m (4,530 ft)
- Population (2022): 834
- Time zone: UTC+3 (TRT)
- Postal code: 33730
- Area code: 0324

Sorgun (also called Büyüksorgun) is a neighbourhood in the municipality and district of Erdemli, Mersin Province, Turkey. Its population is 834 (2022). Its distance to Erdemli is 48 kilometres (30 mi) and to Mersin is 84 kilometres (52 mi). The village is situated in the Taurus Mountains, and in summers, it is used as a summer resort, also known as a yayla. The village is one of the oldest Turkmen villages around. The traditional Yörük articles are exhibited by the muhtar of the village. Around Sorgun there are ruins that date back to the Roman and Byzantine era and tombstones from the Ottoman era. The main economic activities of the village are agriculture, animal breeding and beehiving. Tomato, cucumber, apple, cherry and hickory nut are among the crops grown in the village.
