= Zorkun =

Settlement in Turkey

Zorkun is a yayla (summer resort) in Osmaniye Province, Turkey. Zorkun is at 36°58′N 36°21′E on the Nur Mountains, a chain mountain running in north–south direction, parallel to East Mediterranean coast. It is at an average altitude of about 1,550 metres (5,090 ft) and surrounded by forests of pine and juniper. Zorkun is on the south east of Osmaniye, the distance being 26 kilometres (16 mi). On the way to Zorkun there are a number of minor settlements like Olukbaşı which are also used as yayla.

At the present Zorkun is a summer resort. The area around Zorkun is suitable for winter sports and in the future Zorkun may also be a center of winter tourism.
