= Sumbas District =

District of Osmaniye Province, Turkey

- District
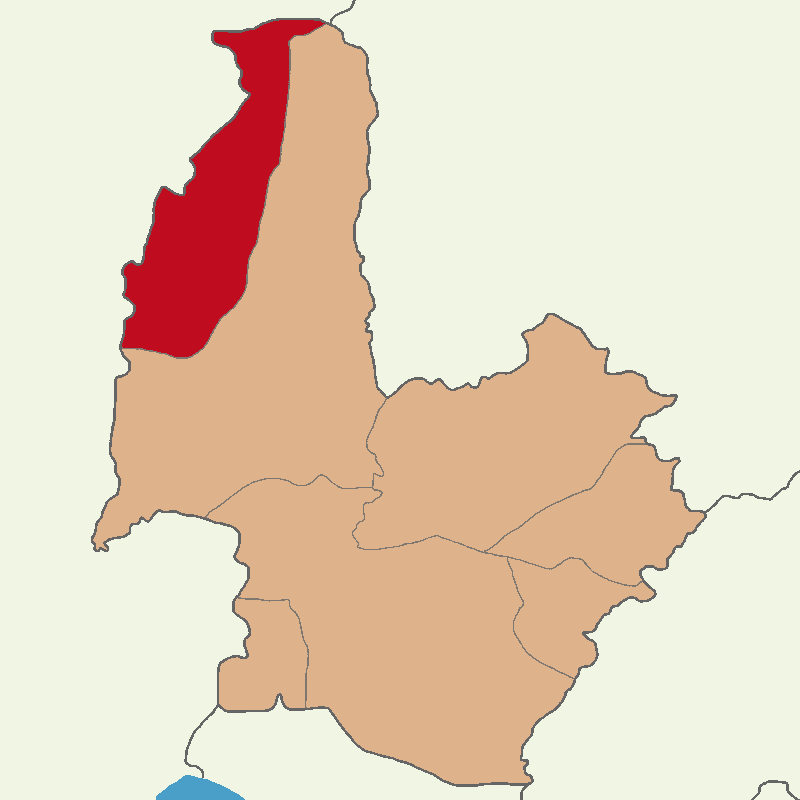
- Map showing Sumbas District in Osmaniye Province

- Location in Turkey
- Coordinates: 37°27′N 36°02′E
- Country: Turkey
- Province: Osmaniye
- Seat: Sumbas

Government
  - Kaymakam: Mehmet Furkan Taşkıran
- Area: 358 km^{2} (138 sq mi)
- Population (2022): 13,129
  - Density: 37/km^{2} (95/sq mi)
- Time zone: UTC+3 (TRT)
- Website: www.sumbas.gov.tr

Sumbas District is a district of the Osmaniye Province of Turkey. Its seat is the town of Sumbas. Its area is 358 km^{2}, and its population is 13,129 (2022).

== Composition ==
There are two municipalities in Sumbas District:

- Mehmetli
- Sumbas

There are 13 villages in Sumbas District:

- Akçataş
- Akdam
- Alibeyli
- Çiçeklidere
- Esenli
- Gafarlı
- Höyükköy
- Kızılömerli
- Köseli
- Küçükçınar
- Reşadiye
- Yazıboyu
- Yeşilyayla
