= Soğukoluk, Belen =

Village in the Hatay province, Turkey

Soğukoluk
- Neighbourhood
- Location in Turkey
- Coordinates: 36°29′15″N 36°09′32″E
- Country: Turkey
- Province: Hatay
- District: Belen
- Population (2022): 352
- Time zone: UTC+3 (TRT)

Soğukoluk (formerly: Güzelyayla) is a neighbourhood of the municipality and district of Belen, Hatay Province, Turkey. Its population is 352 (2022).

Its distance to Belen is 6 kilometres (3.7 mi) and to Antakya is 47 kilometres (29 mi). The village is situated in the western slopes of Nur Mountains and overlooks the Iskenderun Gulf. Its altitude is 785 metres (2,575 ft). It is a typical summer resort (see yayla (resort)). Tourism is the main economic sector of the village.
