= Mehmetli =

- Municipality
- Location in Turkey
- Coordinates: 37°29′N 36°03′E
- Country: Turkey
- Province: Osmaniye
- District: Sumbas
- Elevation: 130 m (430 ft)
- Population (2022): 2,210
- Time zone: UTC+3 (TRT)
- Postal code: 80940
- Area code: 0328

Mehmetli is a town (belde) in the Sumbas District, Osmaniye Province, Turkey. Its population is 2,210 (2022). It is at the southeast of Mehmetli Dam (also called Kesiksuyu Dam) reservoir and 5 kilometres (3.1 mi) north of Sumbas. Distance to Osmaniye, the province center, is 65 kilometres (40 mi). The name of the town refers to personal name Mehmet which is very common in the settlement. The settlement was founded in 1835 as a small village of several families. In 1998 it was declared a seat of township.
