= Akyar, Miyakinsky District, Republic of Bashkortostan =

Akyar
- Interactive map of Akyar
- Coordinates: 53°25′N 54°49′E
- Country: Russia
- Region: Bashkortostan
- District: Miyakinsky District

Akyar (Russian: Акъяр; Bashkir: Аҡъяр, Aqyar) is a rural locality (a village) in Kacheganovsky Selsoviet, Miyakinsky District, Bashkortostan, Russia. The population was 51 as of 2010. There are 3 streets.

== Geography ==
Akyar is located 25 km south of Kirgiz-Miyaki (the district's administrative centre) by road. Petropavlovka is the nearest rural locality.
