= Yarbaşı, Düziçi =

Yarbaşı
- Municipality
- Location in Turkey
- Coordinates: 37°13′N 36°26′E
- Country: Turkey
- Province: Osmaniye
- District: Düziçi
- Elevation: 500 m (1,600 ft)
- Population (2022): 3,559
- Time zone: UTC+3 (TRT)
- Postal code: 80720
- Area code: 0328
- Website: yarbasi.bel.tr

Yarbaşı is a town (belde) in the Düziçi District, Osmaniye Province, Turkey. Its population is 3,559 (2022). It is on the Osmaniye-Düziçi highway, 5 kilometres (3.1 mi) from central Düziçi and 24 kilometres (15 mi) from the city of Osmaniye.
