= Yaylak =

Summer pasture

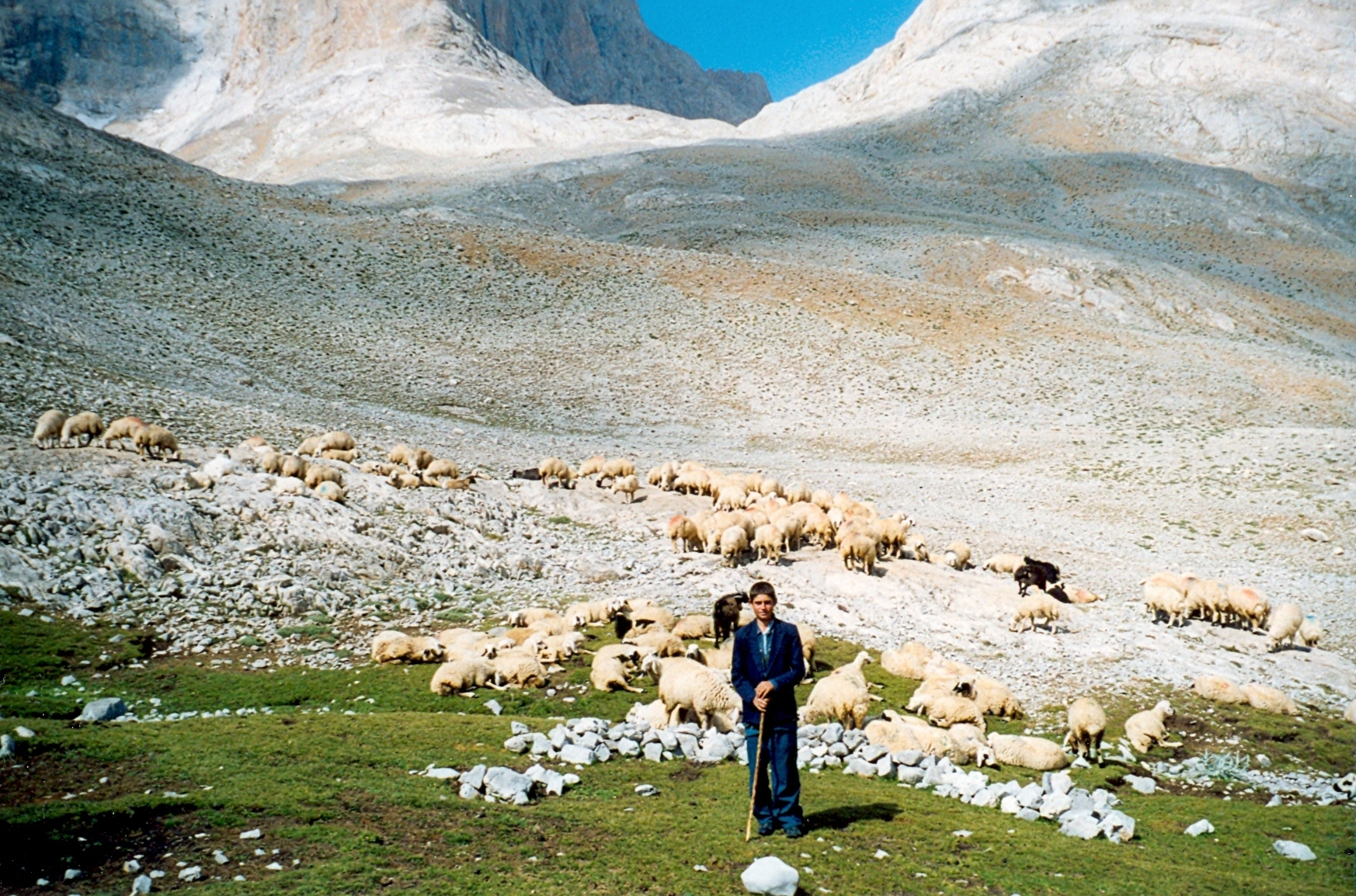
A contemporary yayla at Aladaglar, Turkey

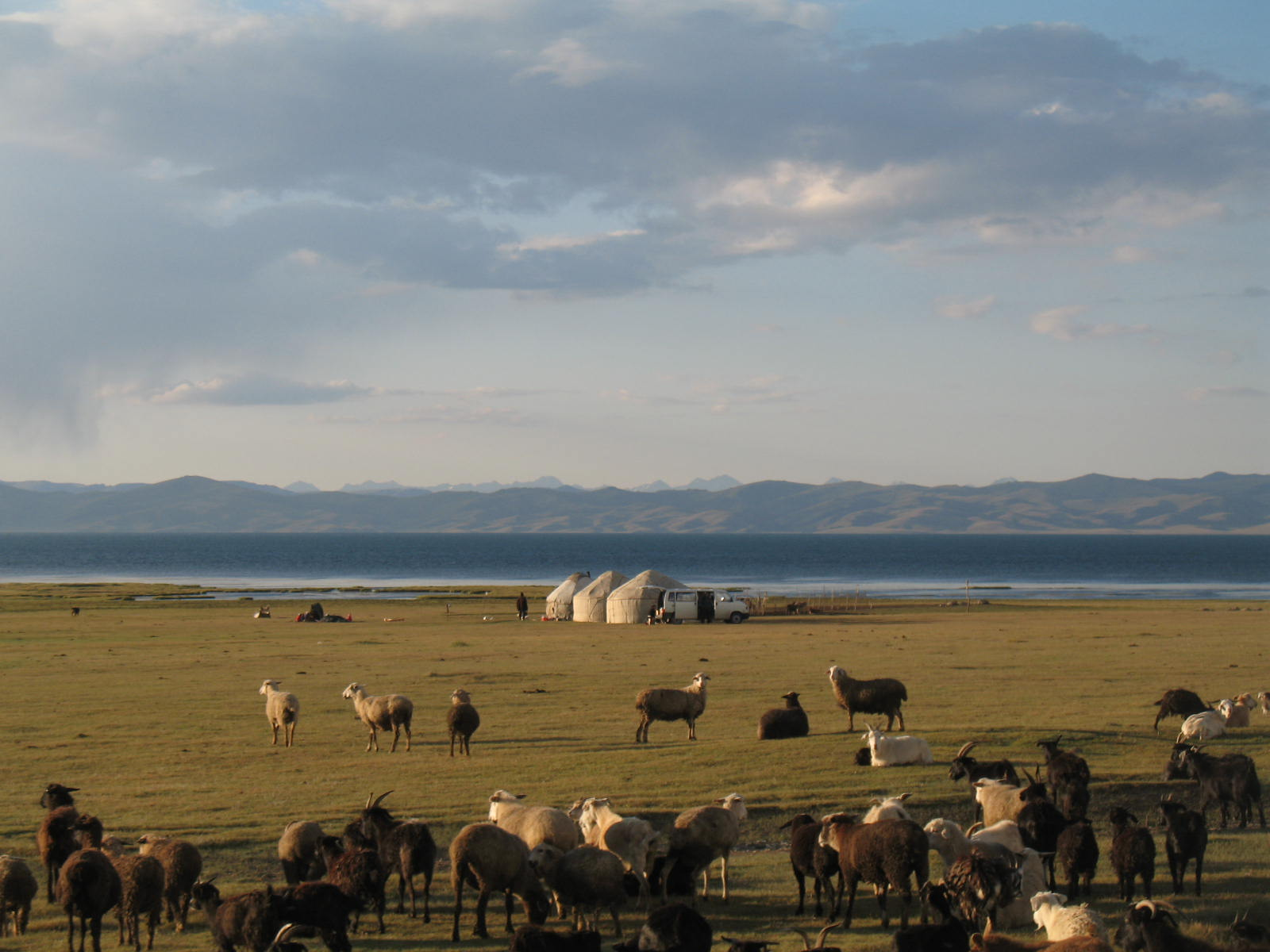
Another modern yayla at Song Kol Lake, Kyrgyzstan

Yaylak (Turkish: yaylak or yayla; Azerbaijani: yaylaq; Azerbaijani: یایلاق; Kazakh: жайлау; Kyrgyz: жайлоо; Persian: ییلاق; Russian: яйлаг) is a summer highland pasture associated with transhumance pastoralism in several Central and West Asian Turkic communities. There are different variants of yaylak pastoralism forms of alpine transhumance, some of which are similar to seminomadic pastoralism, although most are similar to herdsman husbandry (such as in mountainous areas of Europe and the Caucasus). However, in the Eurasian steppes, the Middle East and North Africa, yaylak pastoralism often coexists with seminomadic pastoralism and pastoral nomadism. The term had been commonly used in Soviet anthropology.

The converse term is gishlag (from Turkic kyshlag), a winter pasture. The word gave rise to the usage of the term kishlak for rural settlements in Central Asia.

== Etymology and terminology ==
Yaylak is a morphological derivation from the Old Turkic root yay 'summer' and the denominal suffix -laγ (or -laq), which is used to form nouns of place. The converse term is kışlak (also spelled gishlag or qishloq), a winter pasture (from kış, qish, or gish 'winter'). The latter gave rise to the term kishlak for rural settlements in Central Asia. Variant forms of the term include yaylak, yaylaq, یایلاق, ailoq, jaylaw, jayloo, and yeylāq.

The first use of the word attested in a written source can be traced back to the 9th century Old Turkic work Irk Bitig.

== Definitions ==
Anatoly Khazanov, an anthropologist and historian studying mobile pastoralism, notes: "The specific significance of pastoralism is usually at its most apparent in the specialized mountain variant of herdsman husbandry; in Soviet anthropology this is often referred to as yaylag pastoralism..." In Western anthropology yaylak pastoralism more or less corresponds to the notion of transhumance (Transhumanz).

According to Karl Heinrich Menges, who studied and witnessed the nomadic lifestyle of the Turkic Qashqai tribe in Iran, "[t]ribes in their summer encampments (jajłaγ), and not on the move (köç). They live, during the months May–August, in the region as designated above, and begin to move southward to the winter encampments (qyšłaγ) about the end of August."

In the description of another Western specialist on nomads and pastoralism, Khazanov's classification system is the most modern approach, "classifying nomadic forms according to a society’s extent of migratory mobility, the primacy of specific animals in producing their subsistence products, and the level of symbiosis between nomadic and settled agricultural societies. He categorizes pastoralists into five types, ranging from “pure pastoral nomadism” to “semi-nomadic pastoralism,” “semi-sedentary pastoralism,” and finally to “distant-pastures husbandry” and “seasonal transhumance” (Khazanov's yaylak – Khazanov 1994, 19–23)".

== History ==
A number of scholars have suggested that yaylak pastoralism has ancient roots in Neolithic West Asia, alleging that already in the seventh millennium B.C. the pastoralism of the inhabitants of the Zagros Mountains had taken on a yaylak form, and that besides their permanent settlements these people also had seasonal camps in the mountains. Flannery, 1965: 1254-5, Narr, 1959: 85, Masson 1976: 39. Although, "recent research has demonstrated, however, that yaylak pastoralism in the Zagros Mountains can be dated no earlier than the second half of the fourth millennium B.C. (Mortensen, 1975: 23f., 32-3). However, as yet there is insufficient data for this question to be finally resolved."

== Importance on pastoral communities ==
Yaylak pastoralism enables people occupied with agriculture in specific ecological zones to use other areas as seasonal pastures when they are at their most productive. During one part of the year the livestock is kept in mountain pastures and during the other part is driven to lower zones.

Another explanation of the yaylak's importance and position in today's agriculture is given by recent research: "Because it is semiarid, large parts of the Middle East traditionally have been given over to a mode of livelihood that combines the extensive cultivation of crops such as wheat and barley with sheep and goat herding. Herds are usually moved in fixed patterns between adjacent ecological zones in the course of a year and graze on the stubble of cultivated fields after harvest. Such movement is called transhumant pastoralism or seminomadism, and it differs from the movement of nomadic groups who follow their herds (pastoral nomadism). Seminomadic pastoralists and pastoral nomads form a significant but declining minority in such countries as Saudi Arabia (probably less than 3 percent), Iran (4 percent), and Afghanistan (no more than 10 percent). They comprise less than 2 percent of the population in the countries of North Africa, with the exception of Libya and Mauritania."

Variation in mobile pastoral systems is commonly linked to both the ecology of herding and socio-political negotiations. These factors can contribute to significant changes in the way pastoralists manage territory and lay claim on locations in their landscape (e.g., pastures and campgrounds). In light of the environmental variability in pasture quality from year to year, however, ownership and control of particular locations and resources such as summer and winter pastures (ailoq and qhishloq) and seasonal cisterns (yekhdon) brought about various forms of social interactions, such as trading of resources, political alliances, and land rental, to meet the needs of domesticated herds.

Another source provides additional background on yaylak pastoralism in Iran and Caucasus: "The seminomads live in a valley or on a plain in winter and in the highlands during the summer. Their "seasonal home" can mark the beginning of their transition from seminomadic pastoralism to a settled village life. Another example of this way of life from another part of the Northern Tier is the Bakhtiari tribes of Iran. All along the Zagros mountain range from Azerbaijan to the Arabian Sea, pastoral tribes move back and forth with their herds every year between their home in the valley and the one in the foothills."
