= Cevdetiye =

- Municipality
- Location in Turkey
- Coordinates: 37°08′N 36°12′E
- Country: Turkey
- Province: Osmaniye
- District: Osmaniye
- Elevation: 60 m (200 ft)
- Population (2022): 6,239
- Time zone: UTC+3 (TRT)
- Postal code: 80440
- Area code: 0328

Cevdetiye is a town (belde) in the Osmaniye District, Osmaniye Province, Turkey. Its population is 6,239 (2022). It is 8 kilometres (5.0 mi) north of Osmaniye, on the road connecting Osmaniye to Kadirli at the east end of the Çukurova (Cilicia) plains.
