= Atalan =

- Municipality
- Location in Turkey
- Coordinates: 37°15′N 36°21′E
- Country: Turkey
- Province: Osmaniye
- District: Düziçi
- Elevation: 280 m (920 ft)
- Population (2022): 1,593
- Time zone: UTC+3 (TRT)
- Postal code: 80710
- Area code: 0328

Atalan is a town (belde) in the Düziçi District, Osmaniye Province, Turkey. Its population is 1,593 (2022). It is situated at the easternmost part of Çukurova plains, 10 kilometres (6.2 mi) west of Düziçi. Up to 1968 Atalan was a remote neighbourhood of Böcekli a town to the north. In 1968 it was declared a village and in 1998 it was declared a seat of township. Main revenues of the town are pistachio and dairying.
