= Hasanbeyli =

- Municipality
- Location in Turkey
- Coordinates: 37°07′59″N 36°33′13″E
- Country: Turkey
- Province: Osmaniye
- District: Hasanbeyli

Government
  - Mayor: Selahattin Denizoğlu (AKP)
- Elevation: 762 m (2,500 ft)
- Population (2022): 2,638
- Time zone: UTC+3 (TRT)
- Postal code: 80850
- Area code: 0328
- Website: www.hasanbeyli.bel.tr

Hasanbeyli is a town in Osmaniye Province in the Mediterranean region of Turkey. It is the seat of Hasanbeyli District. Its population is 2,638 (2022). Near the town stands a badly damaged medieval watchtower that once guarded a strategic route through the Amanus Mountains from Cilicia Pedias to Gaziantep.
