= Belen, Hatay =

Belen
- District and municipality
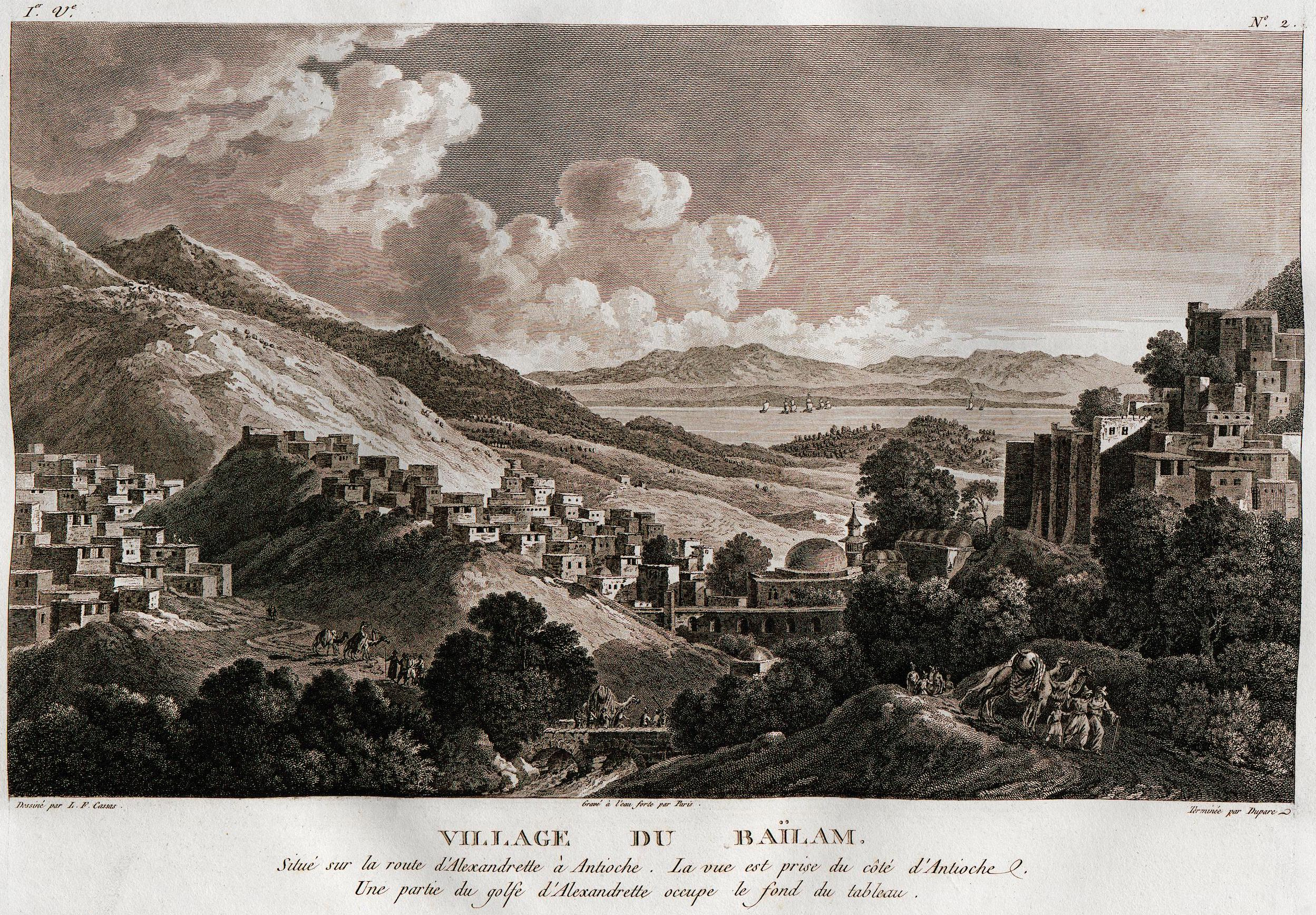
- The town in the 1780s, by Louis-François Cassas

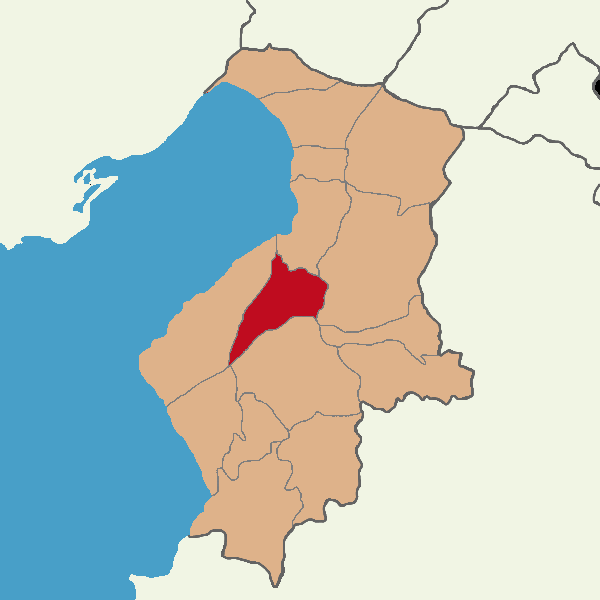
- Map showing Belen District in Hatay Province

- Location within Turkey
- Coordinates: 36°29′20″N 36°11′40″E
- Country: Turkey
- Province: Hatay

Government
  - Mayor: İbrahim Gül (MHP)
- Area: 184 km^{2} (71 sq mi)
- Elevation: 620 m (2,030 ft)
- Population (2022): 34,449
  - Density: 187/km^{2} (485/sq mi)
- Time zone: UTC+3 (TRT)
- Postal code: 31350
- Area code: 0326
- Website: www.belen.bel.tr

Belen is a municipality and district of Hatay Province, Turkey. Its area is 184 km^{2}, and its population is 34,449 (2022).

== Etymology ==
When describing his visit to the region in the 17th century, Evliya Çelebi mentioned that belen means slope in the Turkmen language.

== Demographics ==
In late 19th century, traveler Martin Hartmann listed 6 of the 12 settlements in the nahiyah of Belen as Turkish and the rest without any information on the population.

== Geography ==
The district of Belen consists of a small town of the same name and the surrounding villages in the forested slopes of the Nur Mountains. The Belen Pass is the main route across the mountains and joins the coastal city of İskenderun with Antakya. The pass is a key route between Anatolia and the Middle East. The Belen district is known for its cool clean air (especially when compared with the heat of the Mediterranean coast below) and its mountain spring water.

The roadside restaurants in the pass have long been a stopping place for travellers, serving the typical dishes of Hatay, and especially "Belen tava", meats fried in tomatoes, garlic, spices and peppers.

Belen itself is a small market town with a post office and other basics. The people of Belen are conservative; the mayor of the municipality is İbrahim Gül of the Turkish far-right MHP, elected in 2019.

== History ==
Known in earlier times as "Maziku Bagras" and "Bab-ı İskenderun" the pass was brought into the Ottoman Empire in 1516 after the Battle of Marj Dabiq. The Ottomans posted a guard on the pass, the main route from Syria to Anatolia, and gave the area the name "Belen". In 1535 following a visit by Suleyman the Magnificent a wall was built to secure the pass along with a caravanserai, a mosque and a bathhouse, and with these facilities Turkish families were settled on the mountainside, partly acting as watchkeepers on the pass, along with the military garrison. This early Ottoman architecture is still in place.

The town grew, acquiring the typical Ottoman mix of Muslim and non-Muslim traders and villagers. the 16th century traveller Evliya Çelebi noted the harsh climate, the narrow streets and the forest on the steep hillsides. Belen was key to the defence of the Ottoman Empire during the struggle against the breakaway Egyptian army in 1827. 13,000 people died during the Egyptian struggle to take the pass, they eventually succeeded but during their retreat from Anatolia were harried by bandits at Belen again.

Along with the rest of Hatay State, Belen became part of Turkey in 1939.

== Composition ==
There are 19 neighbourhoods in Belen District:

- Atik
- Bakras
- Benlidere
- Çakallı
- Çerçikaya
- Cumhuriyet
- Derebahçe
- Fatih
- Halilbey
- İssume
- Kıcı
- Kömürçukuru
- Müftüler
- Muhlisali
- Ötençay
- Sarımazı
- Şekere
- Şenbük
- Soğukoluk

== See also ==
- 2020 wildfires in Turkey
