= Böcekli =

- Municipality
- Location in Turkey
- Coordinates: 37°17′53″N 36°21′36″E
- Country: Turkey
- Province: Osmaniye
- District: Düziçi
- Elevation: 250 m (820 ft)
- Population (2022): 2,160
- Time zone: UTC+3 (TRT)
- Postal code: 80740
- Area code: 0328

Böcekli is a town (belde) in the Düziçi District, Osmaniye Province, Turkey. Its population is 2,160 (2022). The distance to Düziçi is 12 kilometres (7.5 mi). Two hundred years ago the original population of Böcekli under the leadership of certain Böcük Koca migrated from Şanlıurfa to present location. With the additional population from the then nomadic Afşar tribes (a Turkmen tribe) they formed neighbouring villages. In 1994 Boyalı and other five villages merged to form the town of Böcekli. Böcekli, economy depends on irrigated farming. Peanut and cotton are among the main crops.
