= Ellek =

- Municipality
- Location in Turkey
- Coordinates: 37°13′N 36°23′E
- Country: Turkey
- Province: Osmaniye
- District: Düziçi
- Elevation: 325 m (1,066 ft)
- Population (2022): 6,277
- Time zone: UTC+3 (TRT)
- Postal code: 80730
- Area code: 0328

Ellek is a town (belde) in the Düziçi District, Osmaniye Province, Turkey. Its population is 6,277 (2022). The distance to Düziçi is 15 kilometres (9.3 mi) and to Osmaniye is 30 kilometres (19 mi). Ellek, a former village, was declared a seat of township after being merged with another village in 1968. Main economic activity is peanut agriculture and dairying.
