= Toprakkale, Osmaniye =

Toprakkale
- Municipality
- Location in Turkey
- Coordinates: 37°04′01″N 36°08′47″E
- Country: Turkey
- Province: Osmaniye
- District: Toprakkale

Government
  - Mayor: Mehmet Taşöz (AKP)
- Elevation: 67 m (220 ft)
- Population (2022): 11,411
- Time zone: UTC+3 (TRT)
- Postal code: 80950
- Area code: 0328
- Website: www.toprakkale.bel.tr

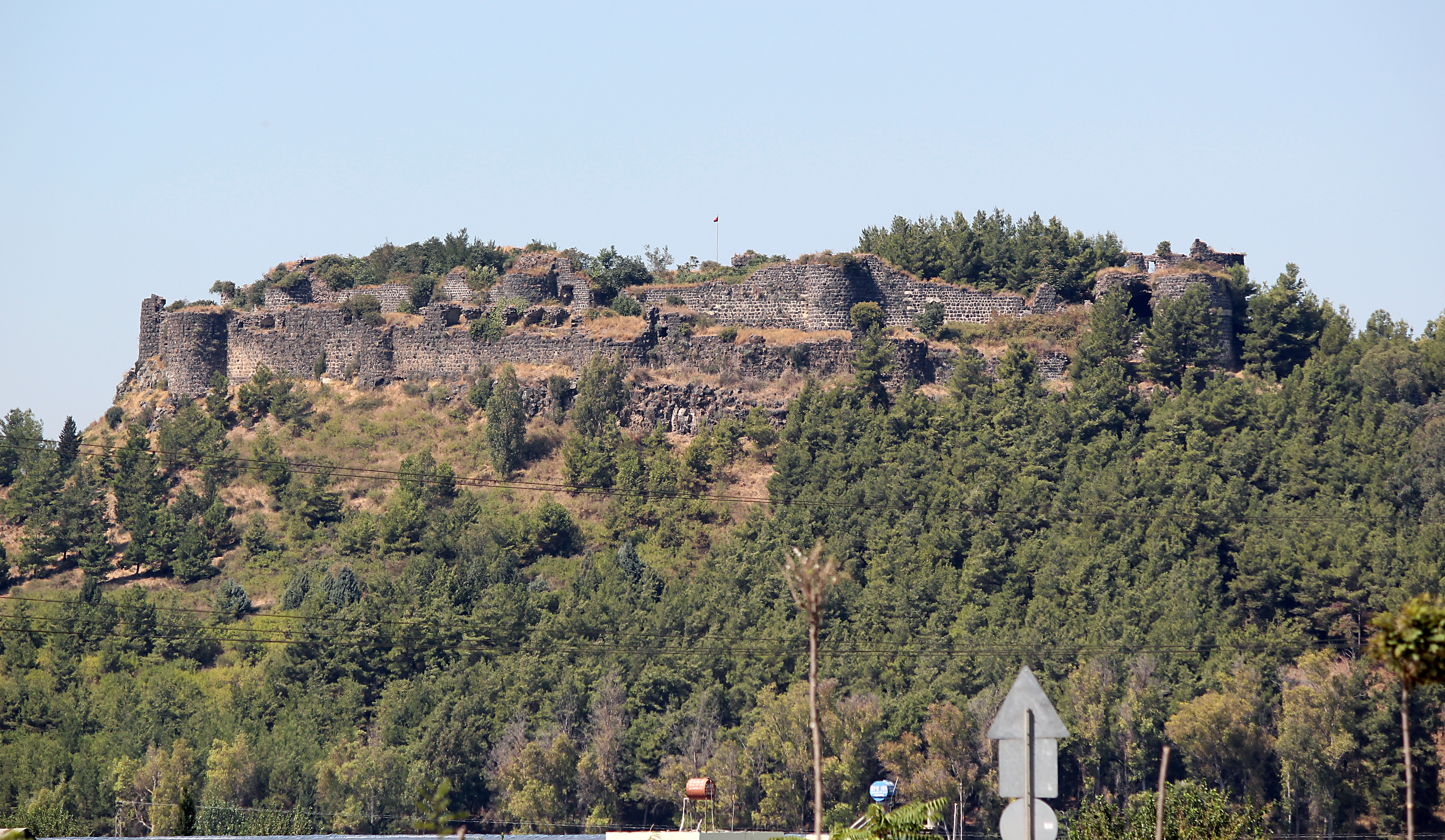
Site of Toprakkale fortress

Toprakkale is a town in Osmaniye Province in the Mediterranean region of Turkey. It is the seat of Toprakkale District. Its population is 11,411 (2022). It is located at 10 km (6 1/5 miles) to the west of Osmaniye. Its name comes from an Abbasid castle near the city.

The town is on a road and rail crossing, a natural intersection of routes between Adana, Hatay and Gaziantep.

== History ==
The great fortress known as Toprakkale (Arabic: تل حمدون, romanized: Tall Hamdūn; Old Frankish: Thil Hamd(o)un; Armenian: Թիլ Համտւն, romanized: T'il Hamdun) was founded in the 8th century by the Abbasids. During the 12th century it was frequently captured by the Byzantines, Crusaders, and Armenians. In 1266 the Mamluks briefly seized the castle from its Armenian lord and in 1337 permanently removed it from the Armenian Kingdom of Cilicia. It was seized by the Ottomans in the 1490s when they captured all of Cilicia.

On the summit of a basalt outcrop is the almost rectangular complex which measures 150 m (160 yards) on its long north-to-south axis, and 105 m (115 yards) in width. The walls are protected by numerous round towers and a lethal array of embrasured loopholes (shooting ports). At the south and east is a second highly fortified wall. To the west and north is a massive talus with its own system of tunnels. Roughly 100 m (110 yards) from the base of the outcrop at the west and north is a curving fortified circuit wall which creates a separate ward far larger than the interior of the summit fortress. Toprakkale appears to be the result of many periods of construction, with the Mamluks as the last of the significant contributors.

== See also ==
- List of Crusader castles
