= Yayla (resort) =

Turkish settlements suitable for mountain resorts or highland transhumance

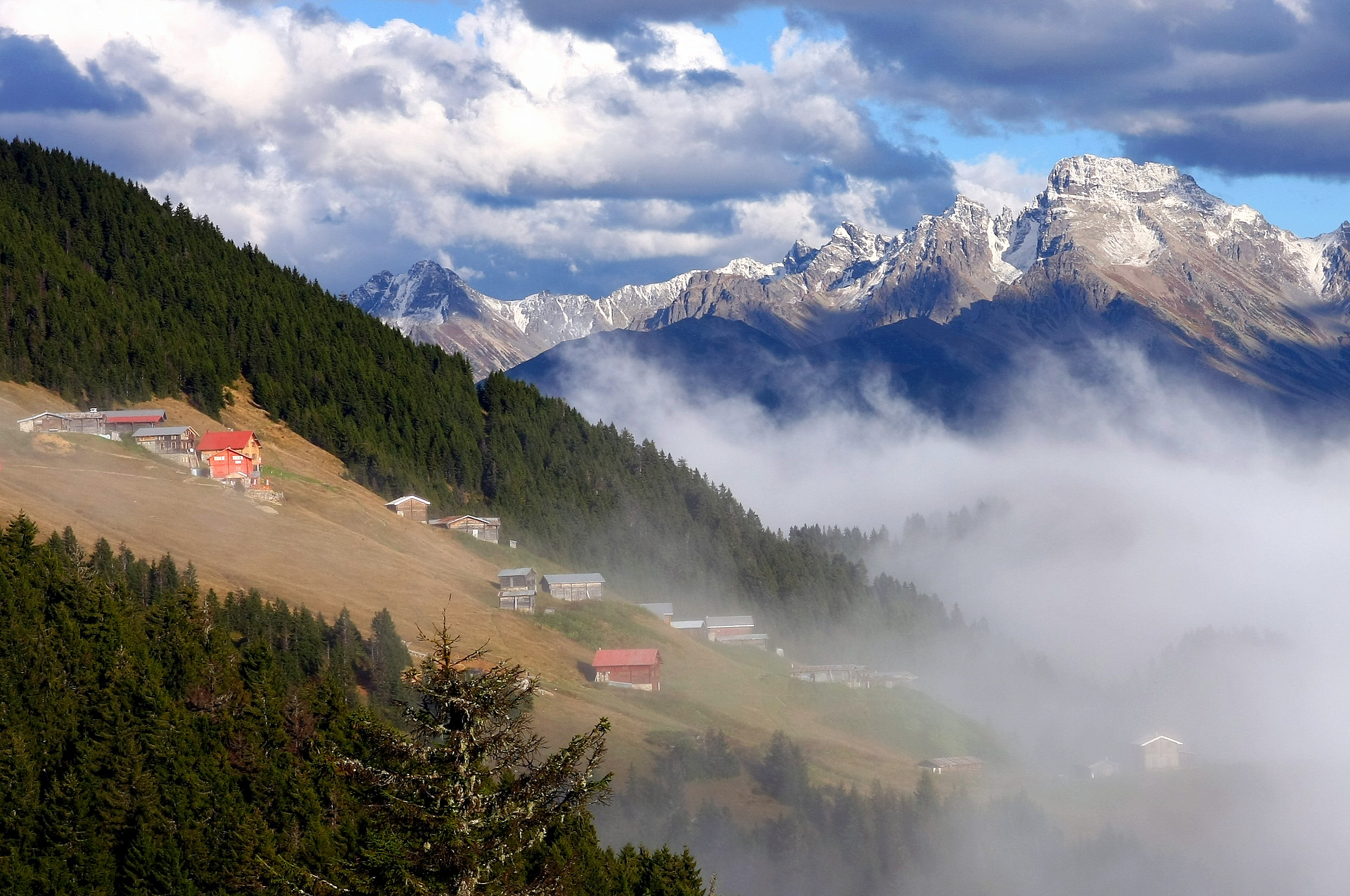
Pokut Yayla, Rize, Turkey

Yayla is a Turkic name given to settlements or areas which are suitable for summer mountain resorts and summer highland transhumance. The term is also cognate with the related Turkic term yaylak. Since in Oghuz languages the last -k or -ı(g) sounds generally drop as in examples such as yazı(g), dizi(g), dolu(g), ölü(g), with the last letter dropped as yayla (opposing to yaylak or yaylag), it is only in use in Turkish and other closely related languages such as Crimean Tatar, Gagauz, Balkan Turkish and Azerbaijani.

== Etymology ==
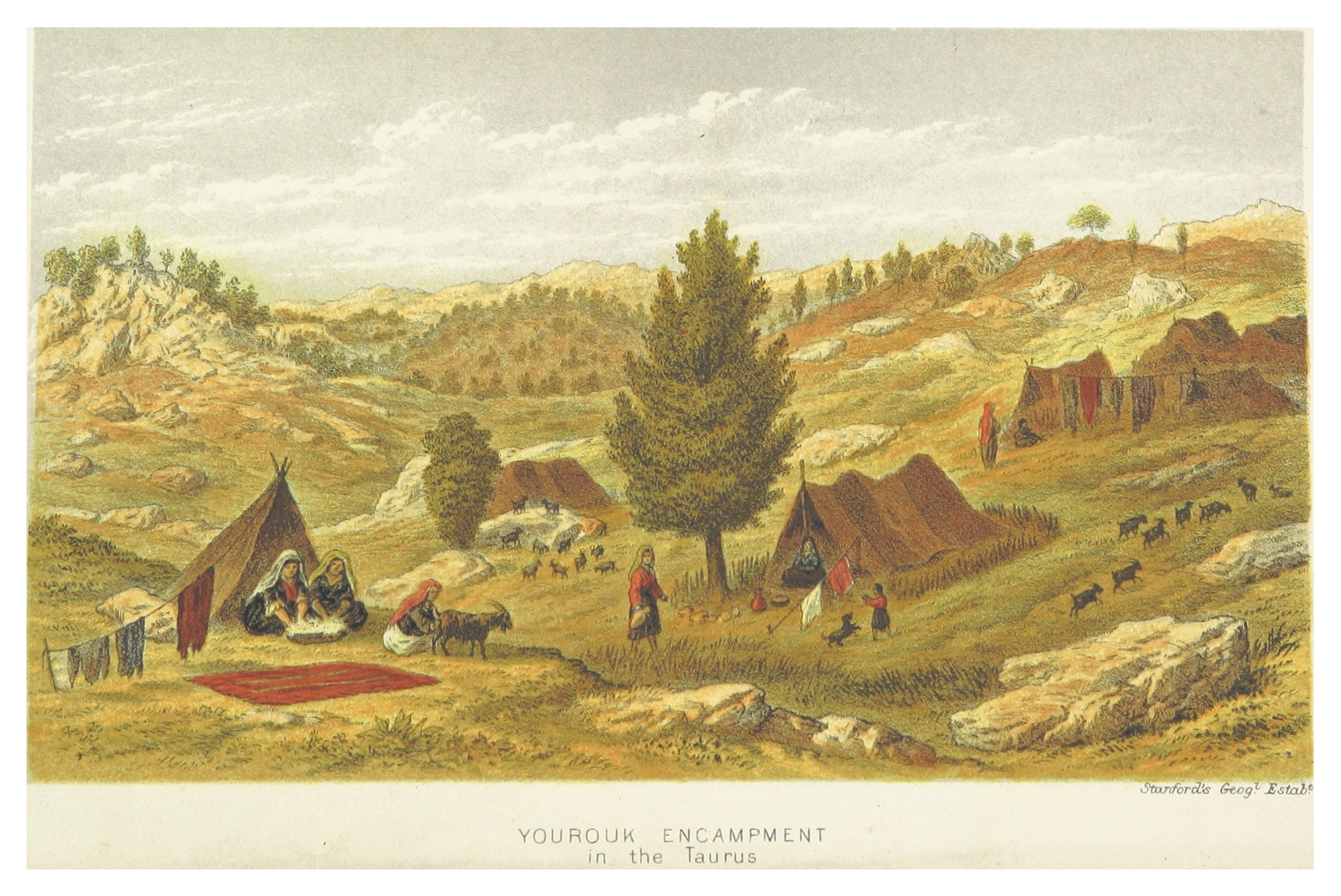
A Yörük yayla depiction from the Taurus Mountains, 1879

Since the antiquity, Turks used to call their transhumance locations by different names depending on the season. Yazlak (for spring), yaylak (for summer), güzlek (for autumn) and kışlak (for winter) referred to transhumance and pasture locations of different seasons of the year. But out of the four, yayla and kışla (with the last letter dropped) are more widespread. Kışla (from kış meaning winter) refers to relatively warmer places in the plains and yayla (from yay meaning summer) refers to mountain slopes where the pasturing is easier during the summer (see Alpine meadow).

== Traditional yayla as resort ==
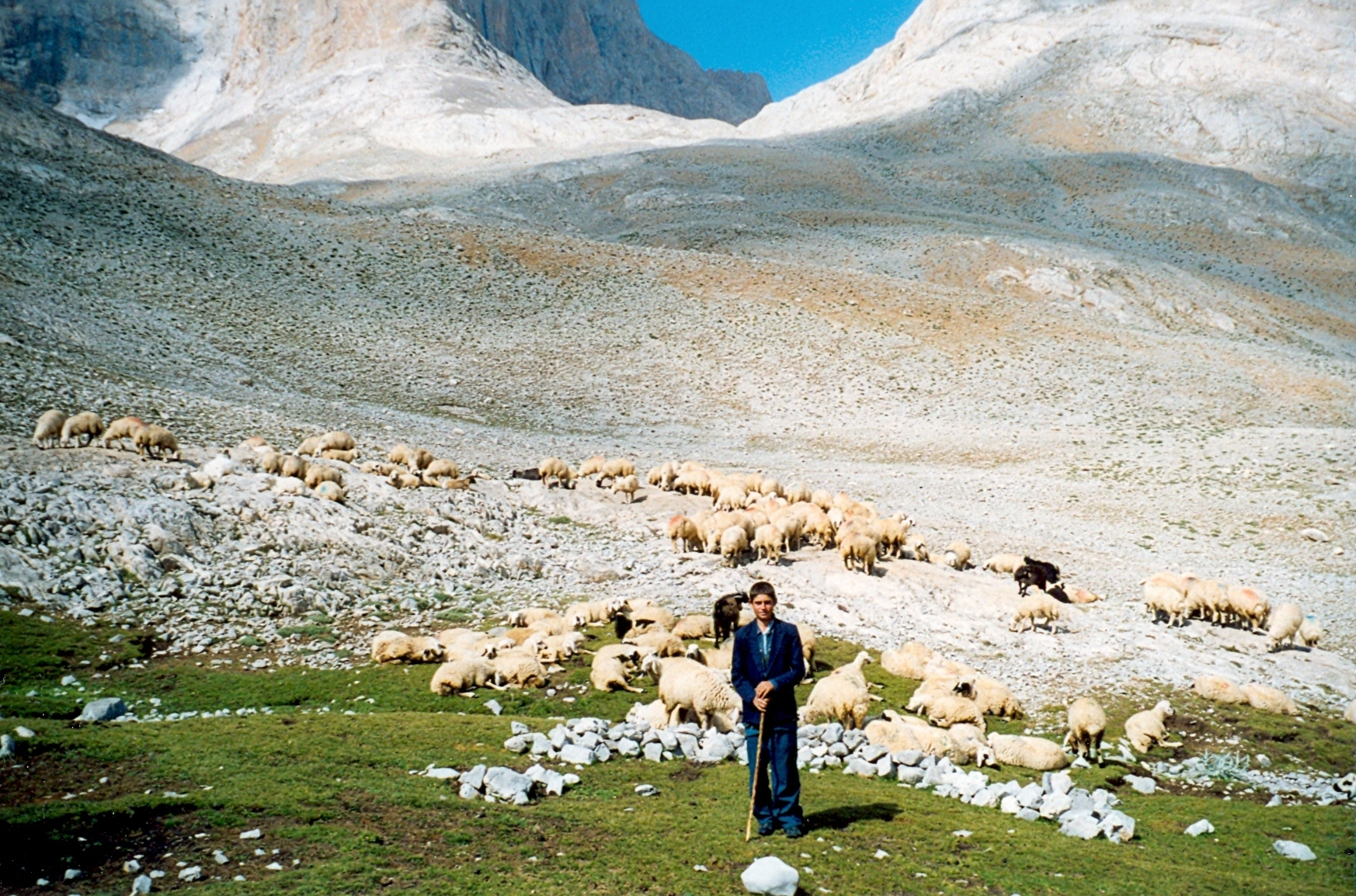
A modern yayla region at Aladaglar (Anti-Taurus Mts), Mediterranean Region, Turkey

While it is also considered as attractive summer resorts for people of both rural and urban areas, yayla (either Turkic yaylak or Alpine transhumance) is mainly a part of the economy of farmers and ranchers who are generally dwellers of rural settlements (such as villages, districts, small towns). In summers, Mediterranean coasts and the regions affected by it are hotter than other areas of Turkey, thus people of Mediterranean and Aegean geographical regions generally seek cooler yaylaks traditionally, instead of Western-promoted beach culture. However, new generations who were born and raised in the Western-promoted lifestyle of urban culture generally prefer beach tourism over yayla culture. Because of deteriorating economical situation in rural areas due to rapid industrialization and growing global effect of capitalism, majority of the rural population had to migrate to the urban areas (e.g. industrial metropolitan cities such as Istanbul, Bursa, Antalya, Adana), also town dwellers had to migrate to bigger towns and cities. Estimates show that in the 1930s, rural population made up 75% of Turkish population whereas contemporary official estimates show that the situation now is the exact opposite, the urban population makes up 75% of Turkish population. Hence, these rural or tribal-originated families who now dwell in the cities, annually migrate back to their villages or yaylas in summers or even springs.

Yaylas, like all other transhumance locations, are generally temporary settlements. However it is known that Turks historically transformed their yayla lands into their permanent homeland (e.g. Kozanoglu tribe), so that makes the temporary status of yaylaks and other seasonal locations controversial since in Alpine and Turkic transhumance culture every season has different permanent houses.

== Contemporary yayla culture ==
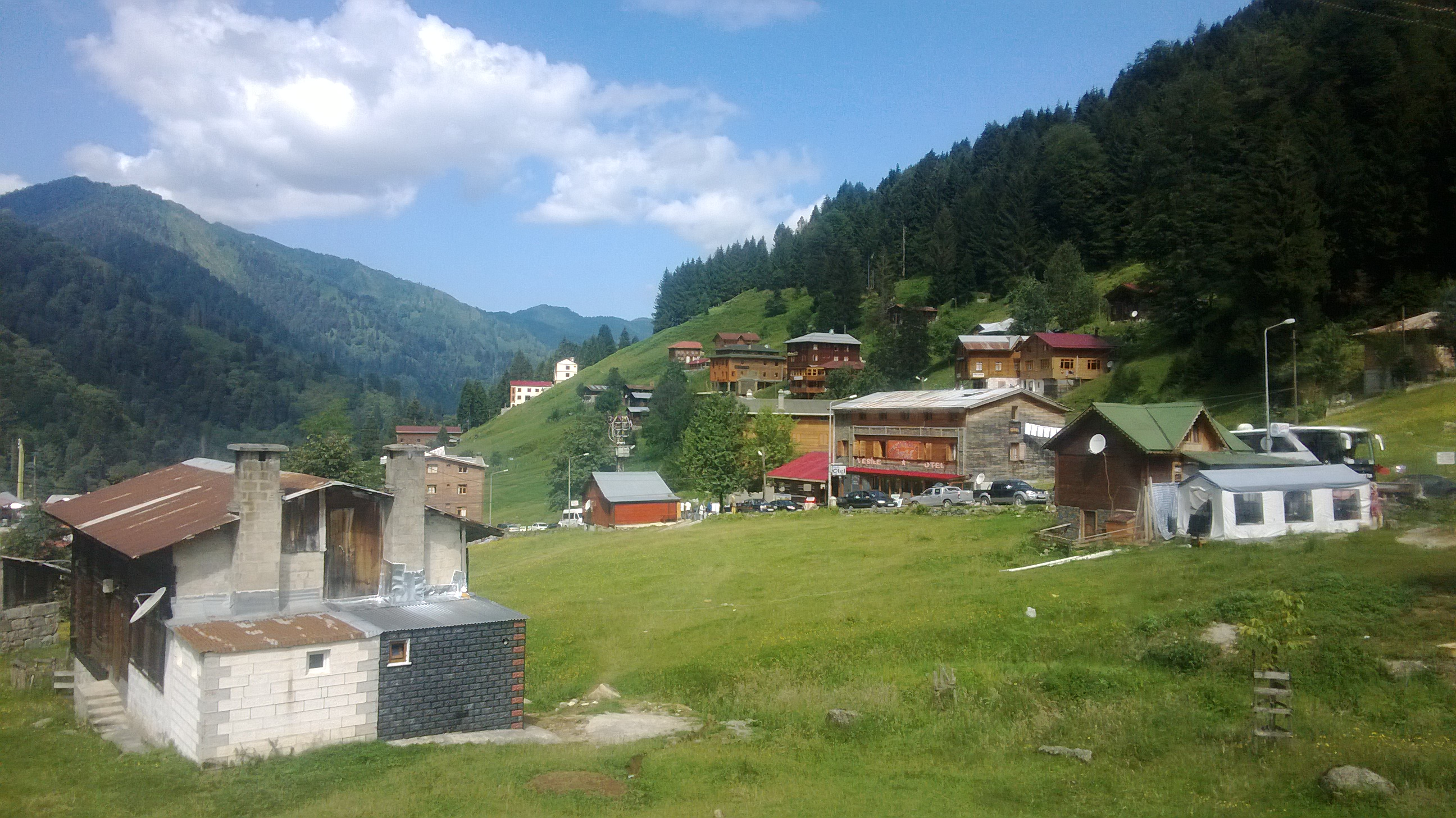
Ayder Yayla, Black Sea Region, Turkey

In the second half of the 20th century, the yayla practice has not been popular as it once was. Some people have chosen beach tourism, perhaps persuaded by televised advertisements of contemporary technology (such as air conditioning, highways to the tourist areas, etc.), which arguably softens hotter summers. However, the Turkish people of tribal background (such as Yörüks, Manavs, Varsaks, Turcomans, and other Anatolian Oghuz Turkic tribes), who make up a significant portion of the Turkish population, are more prone to preserve the traditional Turkic lifestyle and still spend their summer in the sparsely populated cooler highlands or yaylas, instead of hot beaches. Because of its continuing and still growing summer fame as attractive settlements among both rural and urban populations and also among generations born and raised in the urban culture, the yaylas have become bigger and urbanized over the years, creating a new urban identity for some of popular yaylas and transforming their former rural identities (e.g. Akçatekir, Uzungöl).

== Gallery ==
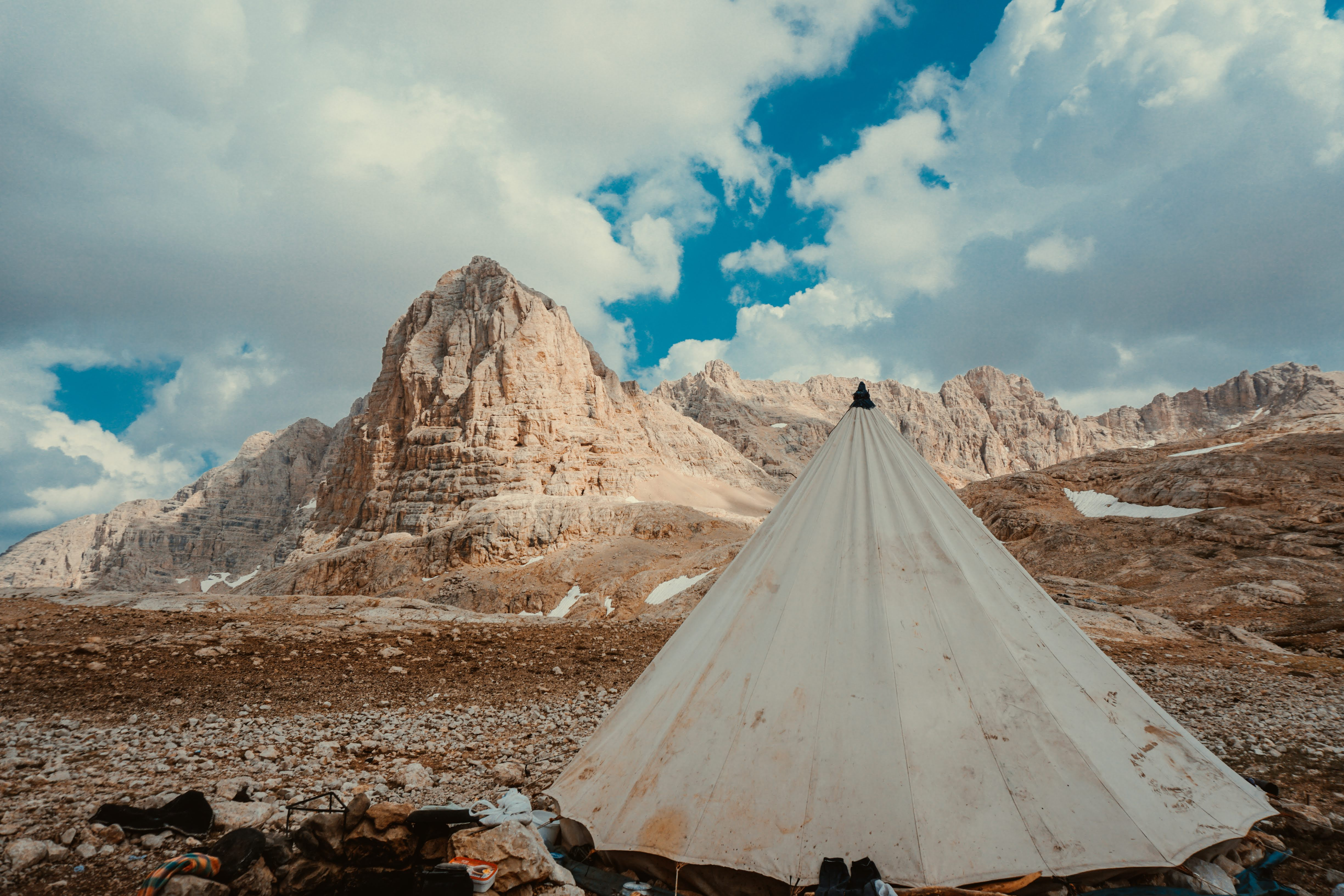
Yörük tent from Aladaglar, Turkey

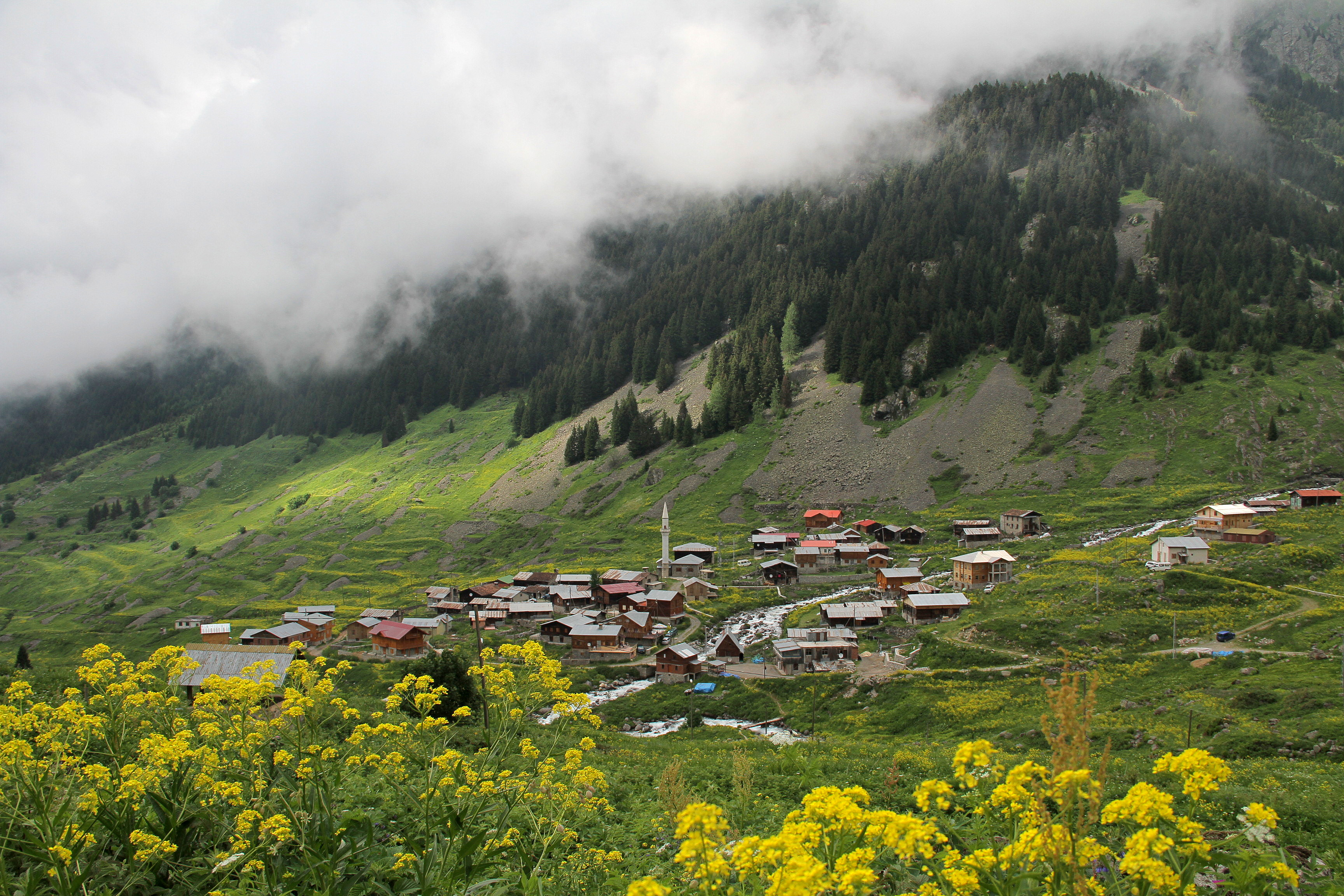
Elevit Yayla from Black Sea Region, Turkey

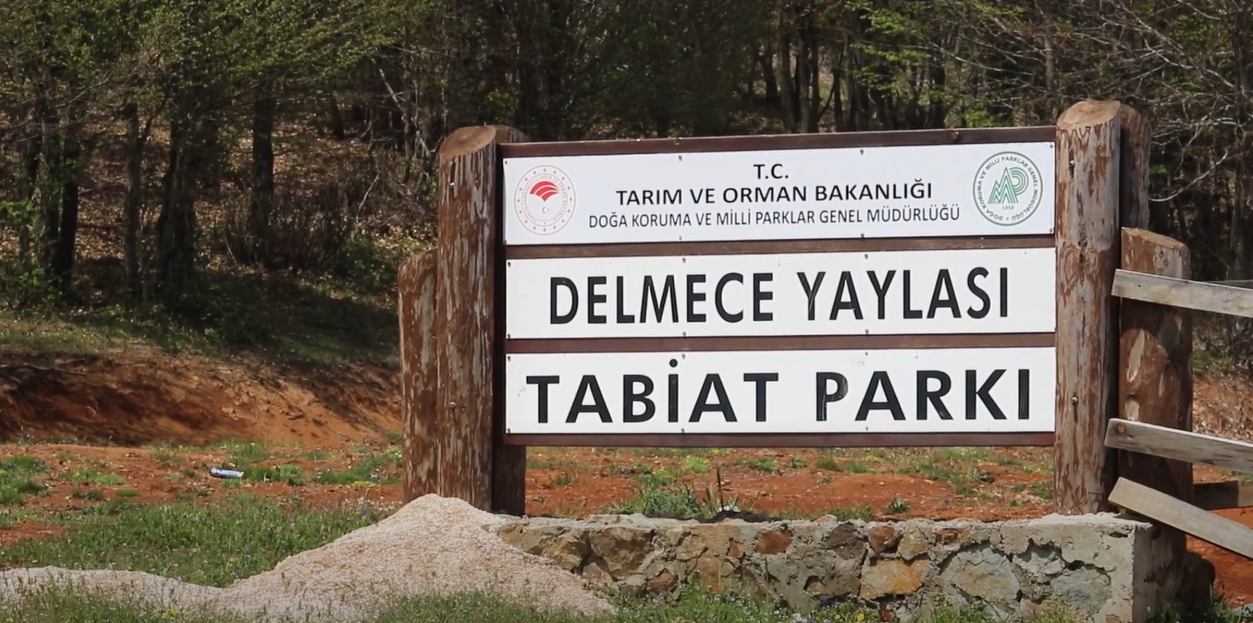
Delmeje Yayla from Yalova, Turkey

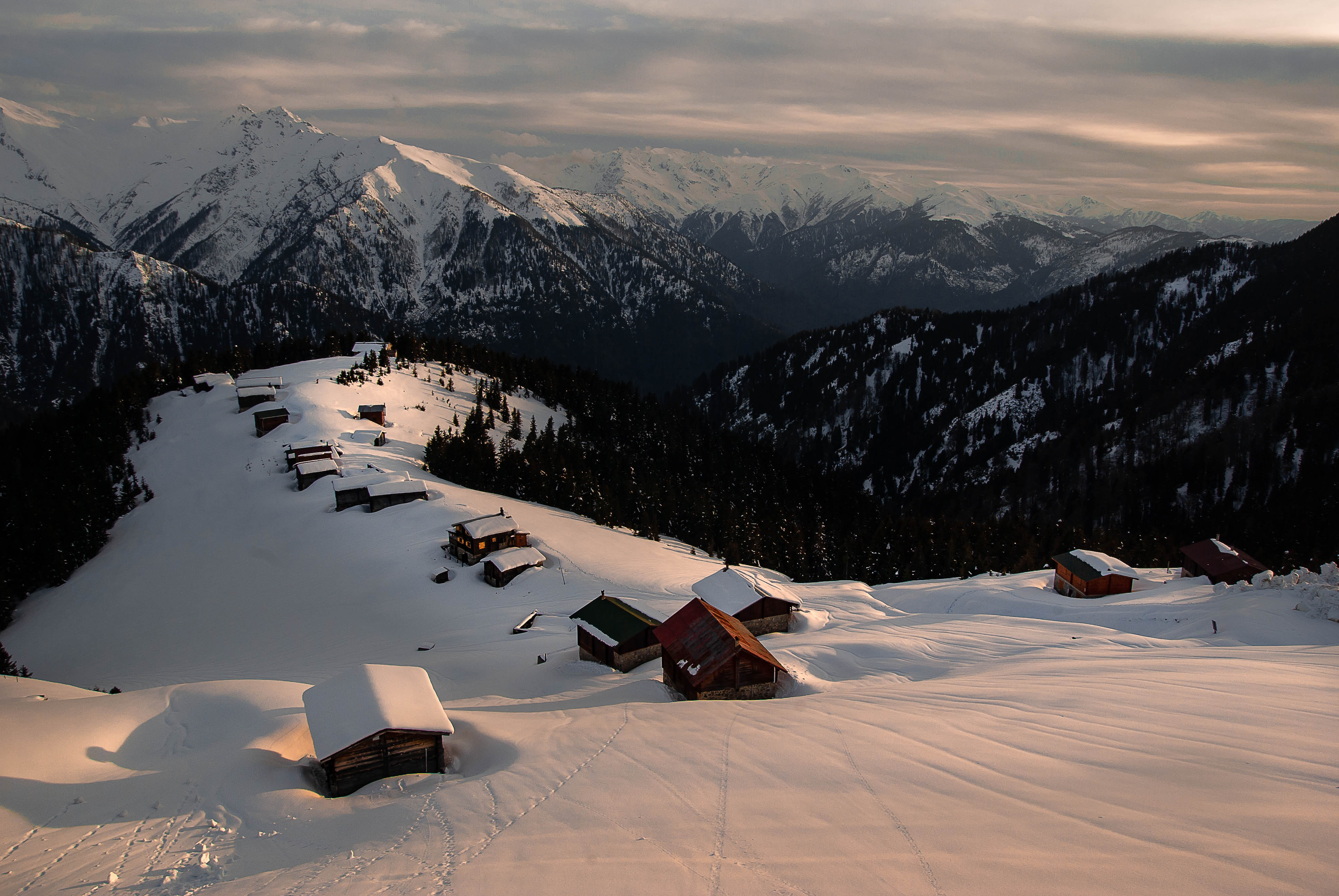
Pokut Yayla from Black Sea Region of Turkey

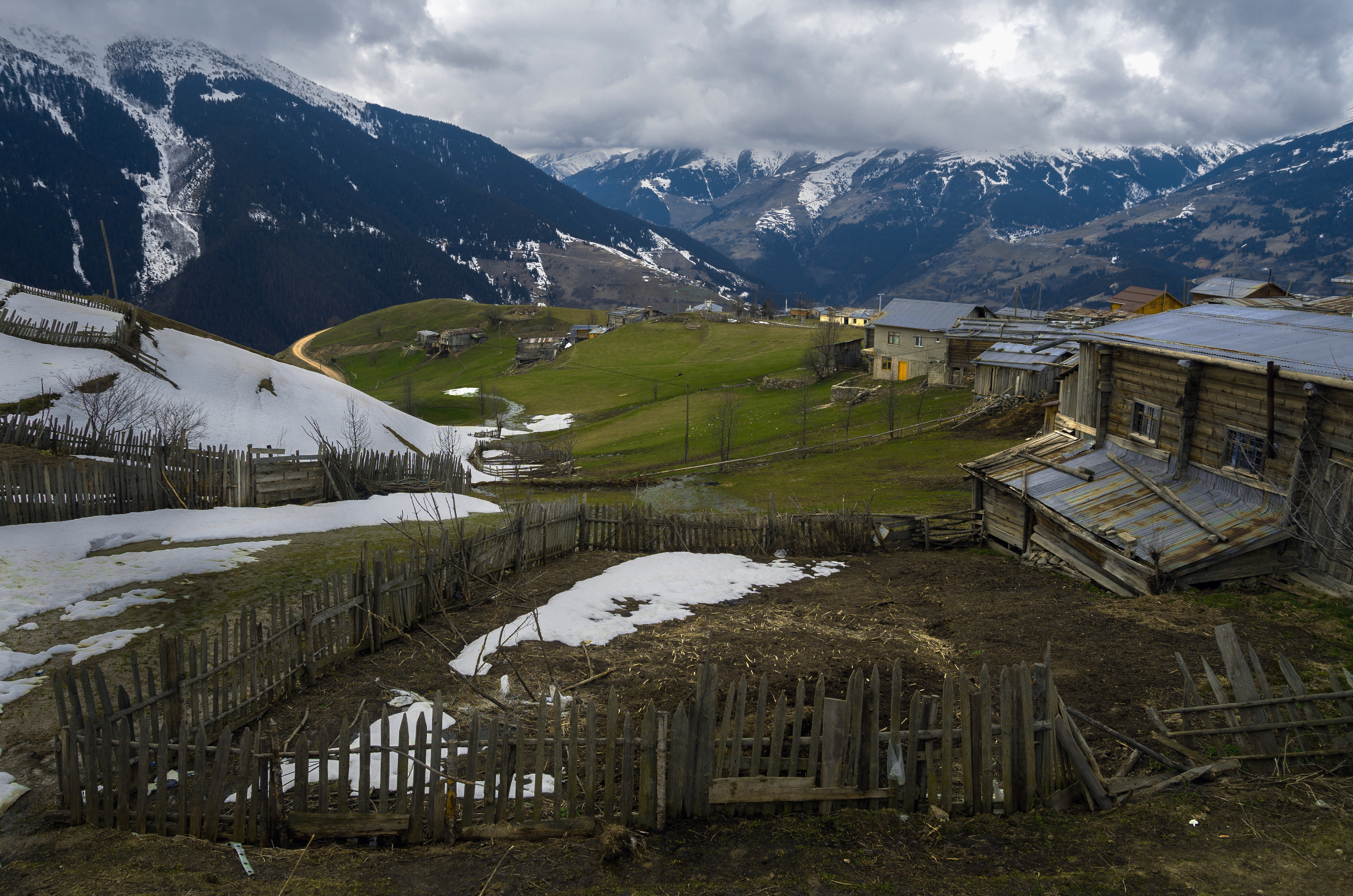
Petran Yayla, Rize, Turkey

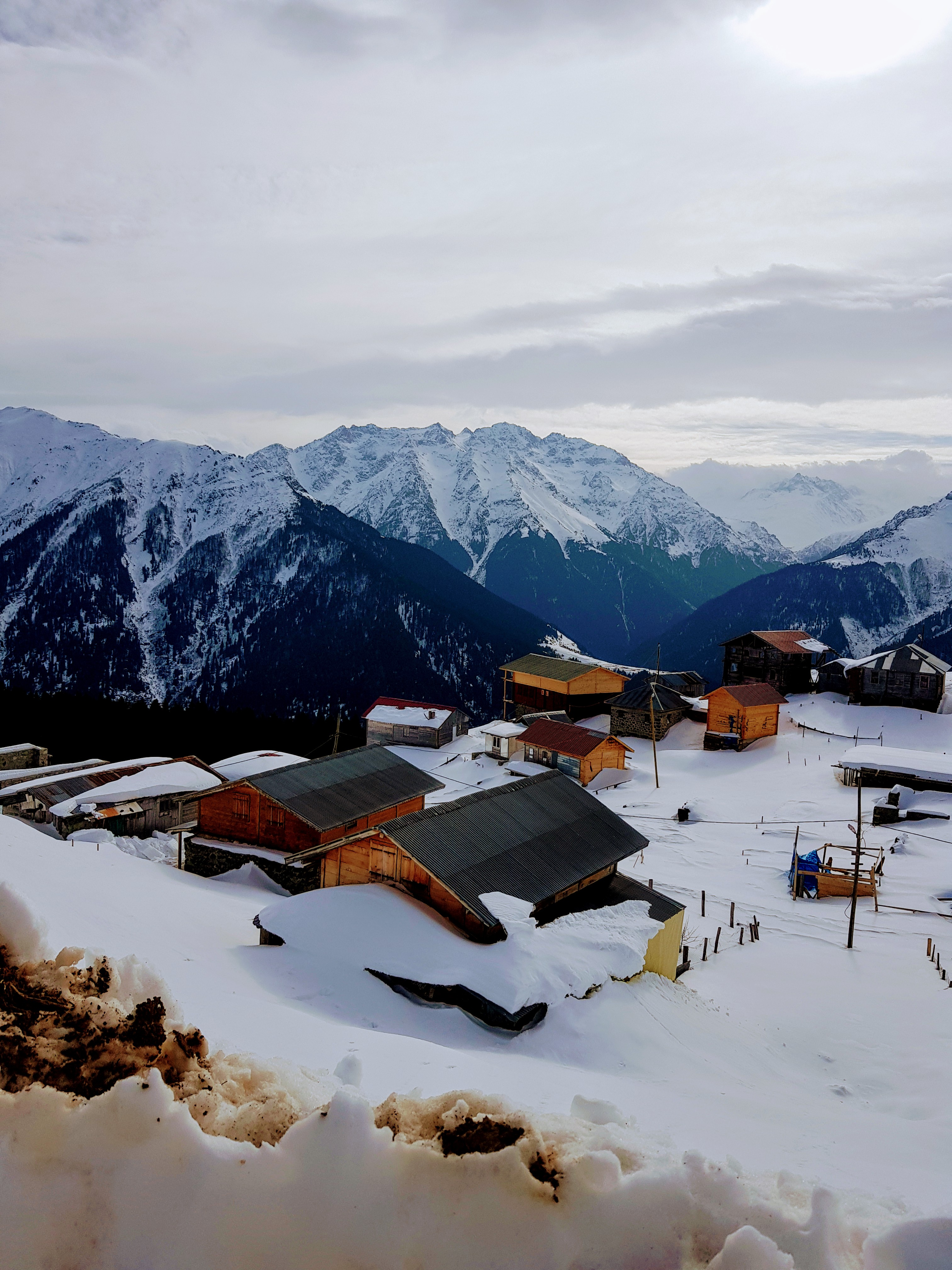
Gito Yayla, Rize, Turkey

== See also ==
- List of yaylas in Turkey
