= Düziçi =

Town and district of Osmaniye province, Turkey

- Municipality
- Location within Turkey
- Coordinates: 37°14′35″N 36°27′24″E
- Country: Turkey
- Province: Osmaniye
- District: Düziçi

Government
  - Mayor: Alper Öner (AKP)
- Elevation: 390 m (1,280 ft)
- Population (2022): 56,724
- Time zone: UTC+3 (TRT)
- Postal code: 80600
- Area code: 0328
- Website: www.duzici.bel.tr

Düziçi is a town in Osmaniye Province in the Mediterranean region of Turkey. It is the seat of Düziçi District. Its population is 56,724 (2022). It is located in a small plain in the foothills of the Nur Mountains and 440 m above the sea level.

Düziçi is on a route from the Middle East to Anatolia and has seen numerous armies and campaigns throughout the centuries. The historical names for this site are minor variations of Haruniye (Arabic: al-Hārūniyya(h); Armenian: Harun or Harunia; Crusader: Haronia or Aronia). Its small castle is on an outcrop about 3 kilometers northeast of the town.

== History and Monuments ==
The ancient names of the city were Irenopolis and Neronias.

The fortress was built in A.D. 785/86 during the Abbasid Caliphate by Harun al-Rashid as a link in a chain of Arab defenses along the Nur Dağları, and named after him as al-Haruniyya. The Byzantine general Nicephorus Phocas captured the 1,500 residents of Haruniyya in 959. When it was recaptured by Emir of Aleppo, Sayf al-Dawla, in 967, the fort was repaired. Following the Battle of Manzikert in 1071 nomadic Turks began to move into Anatolia and the nearby hills were temporarily settled by the Avşar tribe of the Turkmen. At some point between the mid-12th century and 1198/99 it became the possession of the Armenian Kingdom of Cilicia. On January 22, 1236 the Armenian King Hethum I and his wife Isabella bestowed the castle and village of Haruniyya to the Knights of the Teutonic Order.

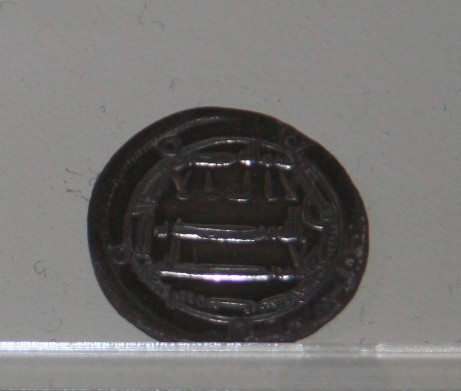
Silver dirham of the Islamic Abbasid Caliphate minted in Haruniyya

The plan of the local medieval fortress, Haruniye Kalesi, reveals a compact keep-like structure with a massive tower at the east, which protects a postern gate. There are continuous galleries with pointed vaults in the north and west walls which are opened by embrasured arrow slits. The main entrance is at the south. Repairs to the castle may belong to the Teutonic Knights or the Mamluks. The lower level of the large tower at the east may have functioned as a cistern.

In the late 13th century it was captured by the Egyptian Mamluks, who made Haruniyya the administrative center for eastern Cilicia in the mid-14th century. The Ottomans took control in 1516 during the campaign against Egypt of Sultan Selim I. In the Ottoman period the town was still known as Haruniye.

Düziçi is one of many places in the Çukurova area that claims association with the legendary 17th century folk-poet Karacaoğlan.

The town was occupied by the French forces after the First World War until the Turkish War of Independence.

=== Education ===
1 High School of Science in the town center, 2 Anatolian High School, 1 Public High School, 1 Vocational and Technical High School, 1 Health Professions High School, 1 Commercial High School, 1 Multi-Program High School a total of 8 schools, including, in the hands District 1 General high school for a total of 9 high school, also one kindergarten, one 8 years 22 and 29 at 5 There is a total of 51 years, including elementary school. There are a total of 61 schools across the district.

=== Places of interest ===
- The castle of Harun al-Rahshid.
- The Haruniye hot springs.
- Mount Düldül, a peak in the Nur Mountains

== See also ==
- List of Crusader castles
