= Sumbas =

- Municipality
- Location in Turkey
- Coordinates: 37°26′35″N 36°01′56″E
- Country: Turkey
- Province: Osmaniye
- District: Sumbas

Government
  - Mayor: Zeki Demiroğlu (AKP)
- Elevation: 85 m (279 ft)
- Population (2022): 1,999
- Time zone: UTC+3 (TRT)
- Postal code: 80900
- Area code: 0328
- Website: www.sumbas.bel.tr

Sumbas is a town in Osmaniye Province in the Mediterranean region of Turkey. It is the seat of Sumbas District. Its population is 1,999 (2022).

In 2022, during infrastructure work, a marble statue of Virgin Mary was found dated back to the Roman period.
