= Osmaniye Province =

Coordinates: 37°13′41″N 36°12′45″E

Osmaniye Province Osmaniye ili
- Province
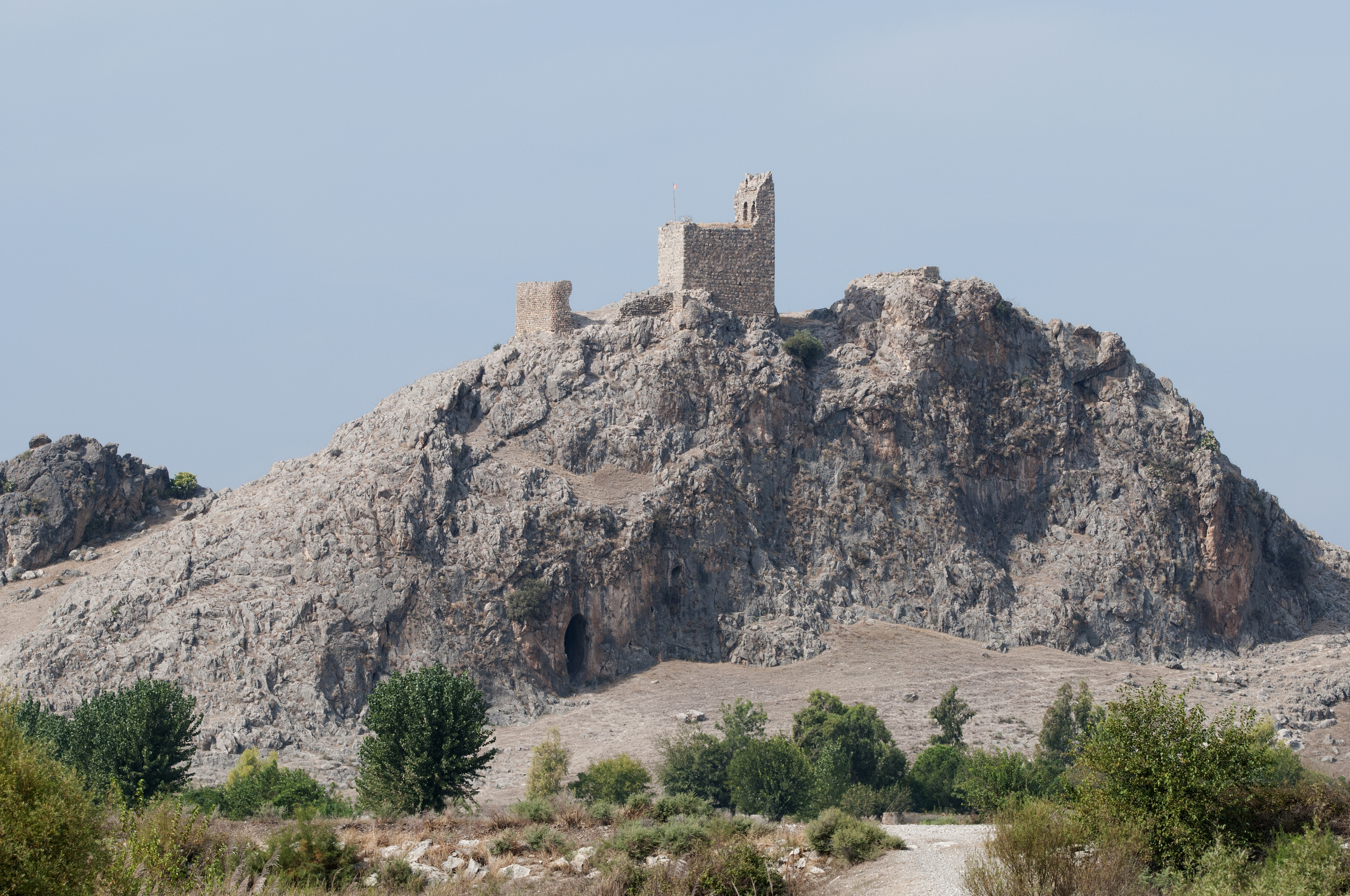
- Castle of Amouda

- Location of the province within Turkey
- Country: Turkey
- Seat: Osmaniye

Government
  - Governor: Mehmet Fatih Serdengeçti
- Area: 3,320 km^{2} (1,280 sq mi)
- Population (2022): 559,405
  - Density: 168/km^{2} (436/sq mi)
- Time zone: UTC+3 (TRT)
- Area code: 0328
- Website: www.osmaniye.gov.tr

Osmaniye Province (Turkish: Osmaniye ili) is a province in south-central Turkey. It was named Cebel-i Bereket (lit. 'Fertile Mountain') in the early republic until 1933, when it was incorporated into Adana Province. It was made a province again in 1996. Its area is 3,320 km^{2}, and its population is 559,405 (2022). The province is situated in Çukurova, a geographical, economical and cultural region. The capital of the province is Osmaniye. Other major towns include Kadirli and Düziçi.

== Geography ==
Köppen map of Osmaniye Province and surrounding regions:
- Csa
- Csb
- Dsa
- Dsb

Osmaniye Province is mainly under hot-summer Mediterranean climate (Csa) according to Köppen climate classification system.

== Districts ==
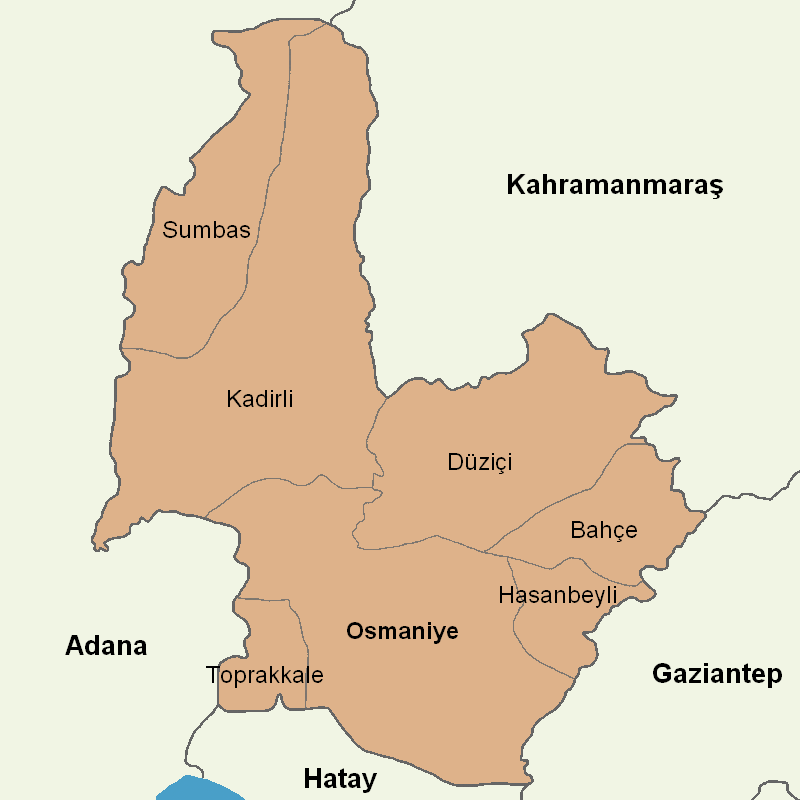
Osmaniye districts

Osmaniye province is divided into 7 districts (capital district in bold):

- Bahçe
- Düziçi
- Hasanbeyli
- Kadirli
- **Osmaniye**
- Sumbas
- Toprakkale

== Historical sites and ruins ==
- Karatepe
- Kastabala ancient city
- Toprakkale Castle
- Harun Reşit Kalesi
- Kırk Kapı Kilisesi, a church
- Ala Mosque, a mosque

== Notable people ==
- Yaşar Kemal, Turkish-Kurdish writer and human rights activist
- Devlet Bahçeli, Turkish politician and current leader of Nationalist Movement Party
- Samet Aybaba, Football manager
- Ahmet Yıldırım, Football manager

== Festivals ==
- Karakucak Wrestling Festival - Kadirli (25–26 May)

== Gallery ==
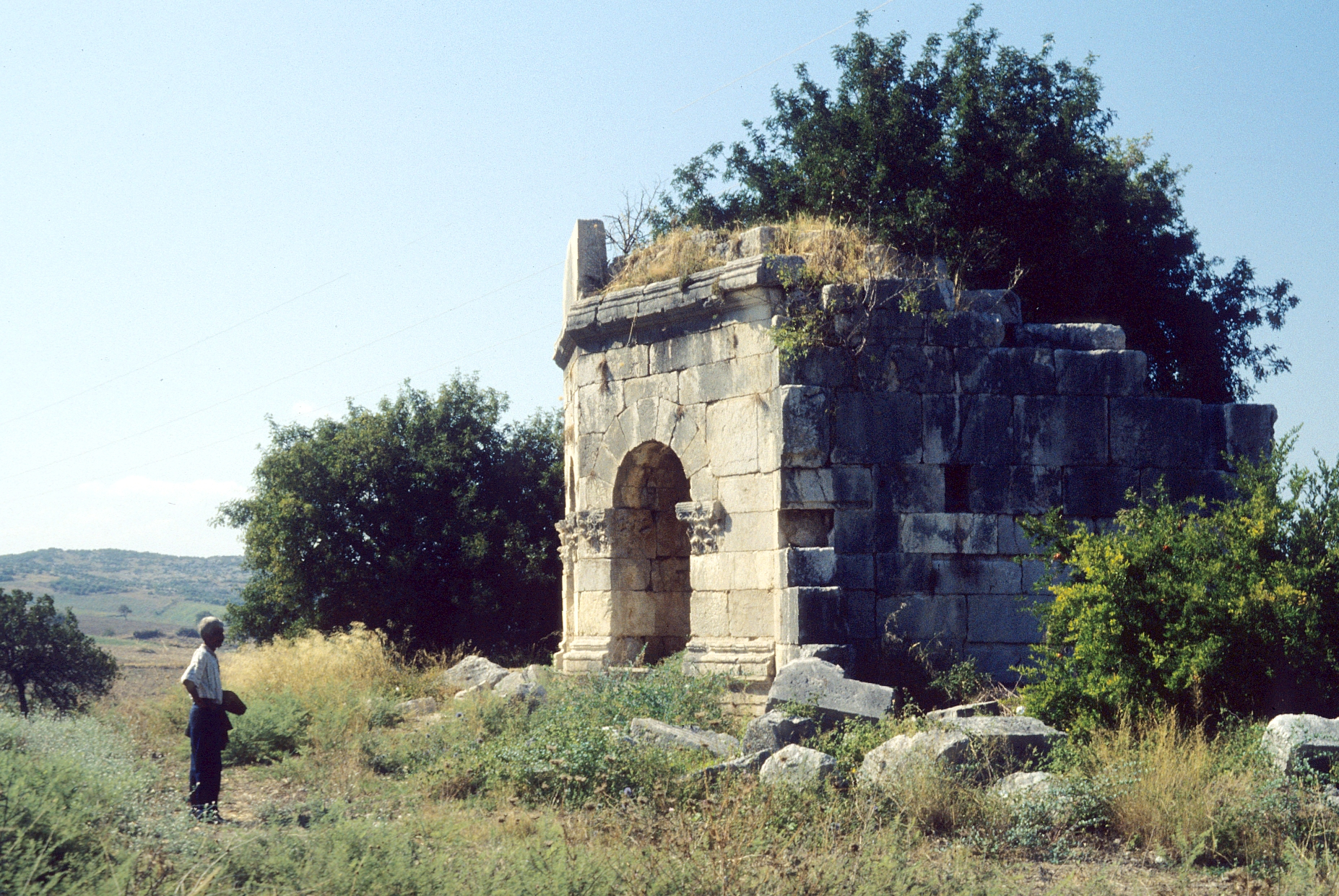
Ancient city of Hierapolis Castabala in Osmaniye

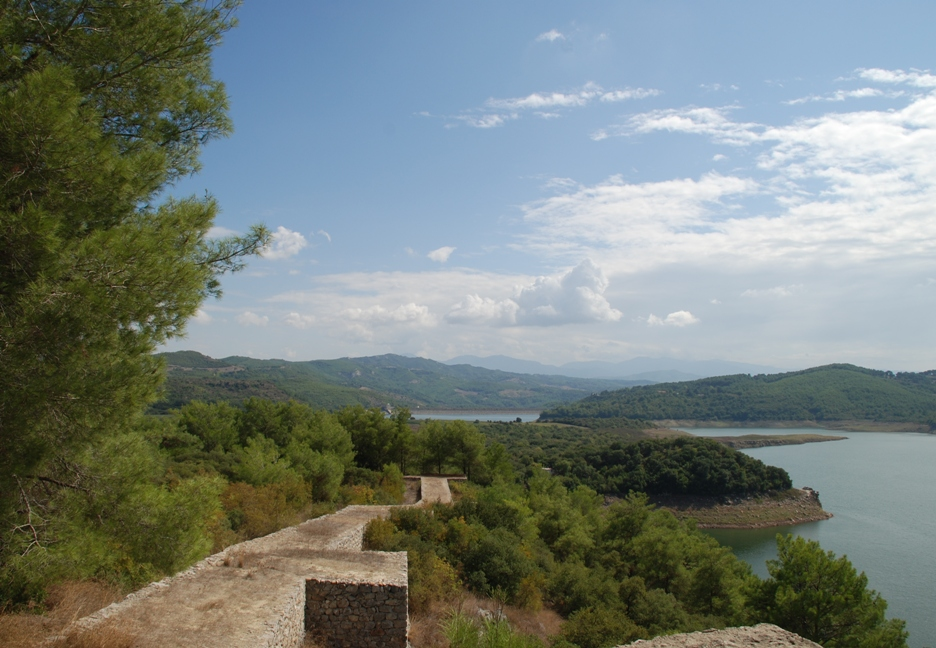
Karatepe historic site

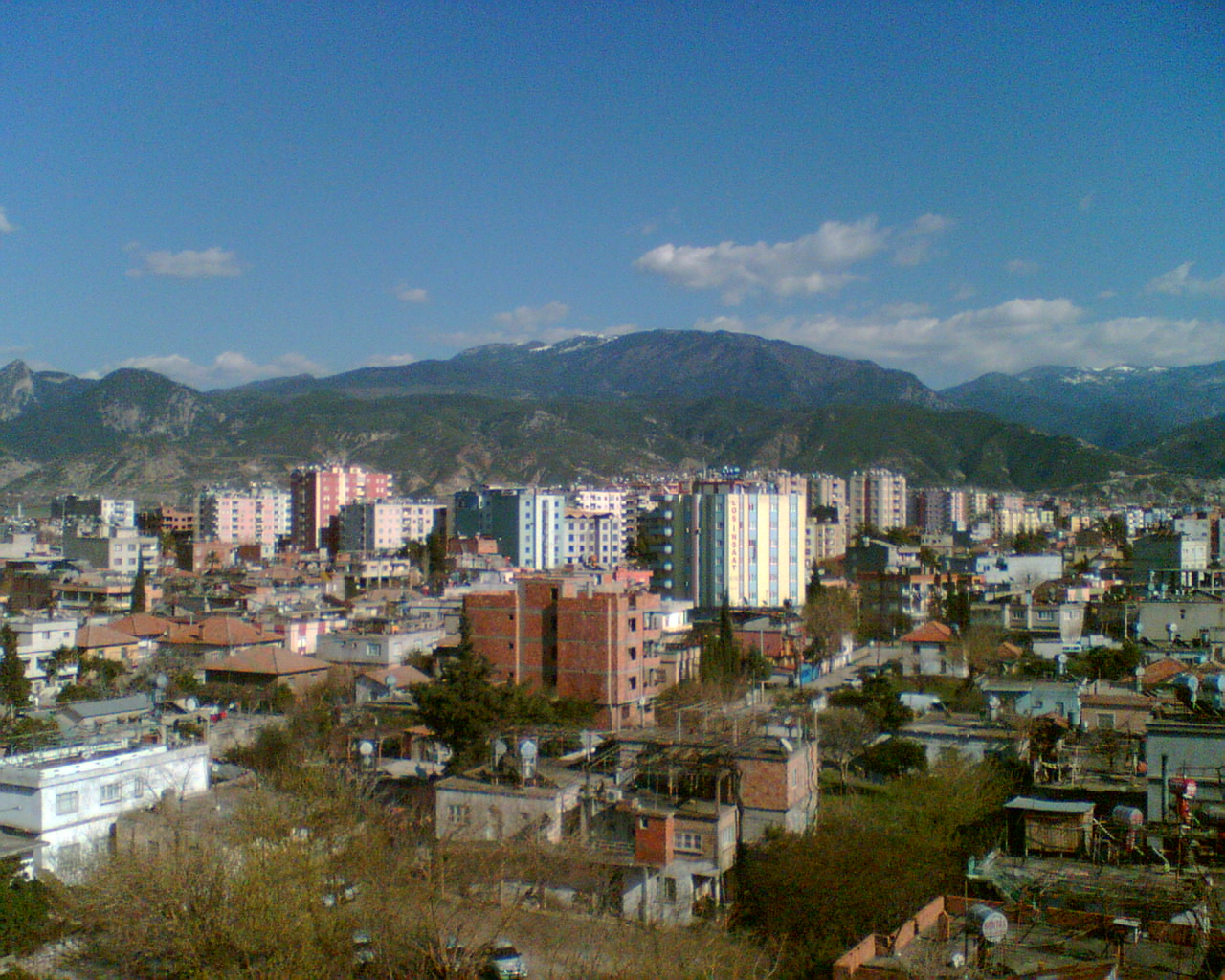
A view from the city of Osmaniye

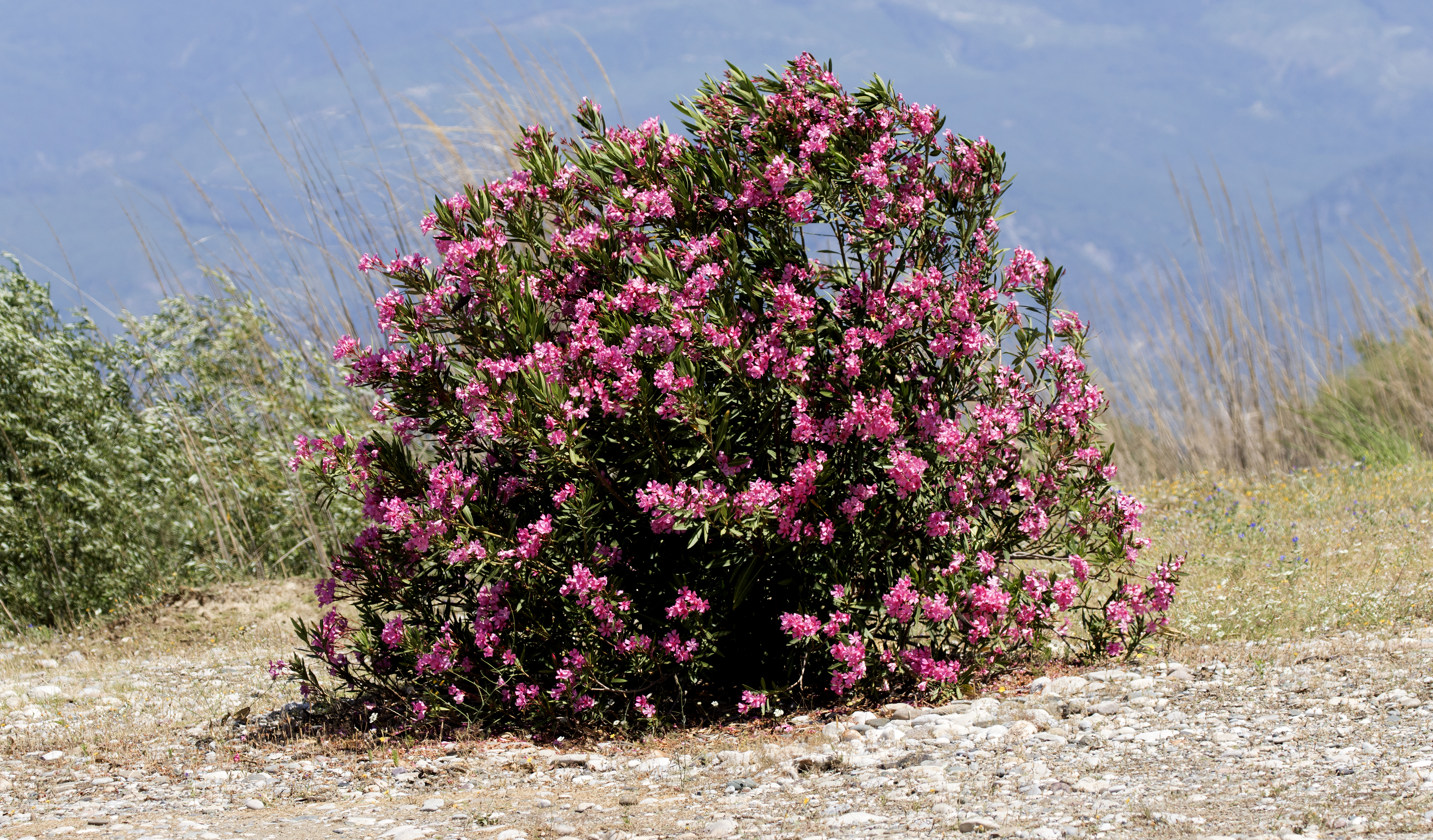
A flowering plant of Nerium oleander in Kesmeburun

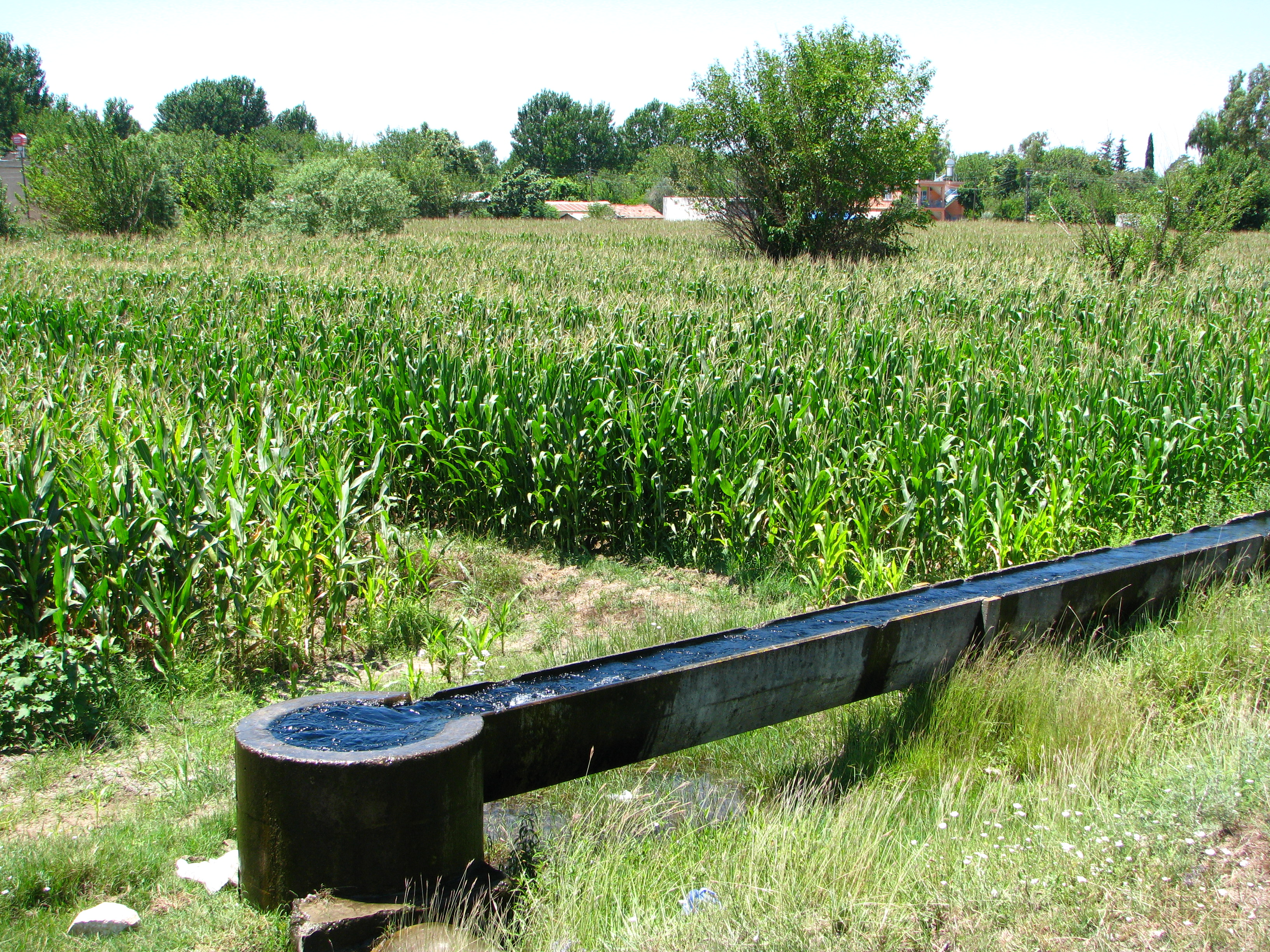
Corn field and irrigation canal

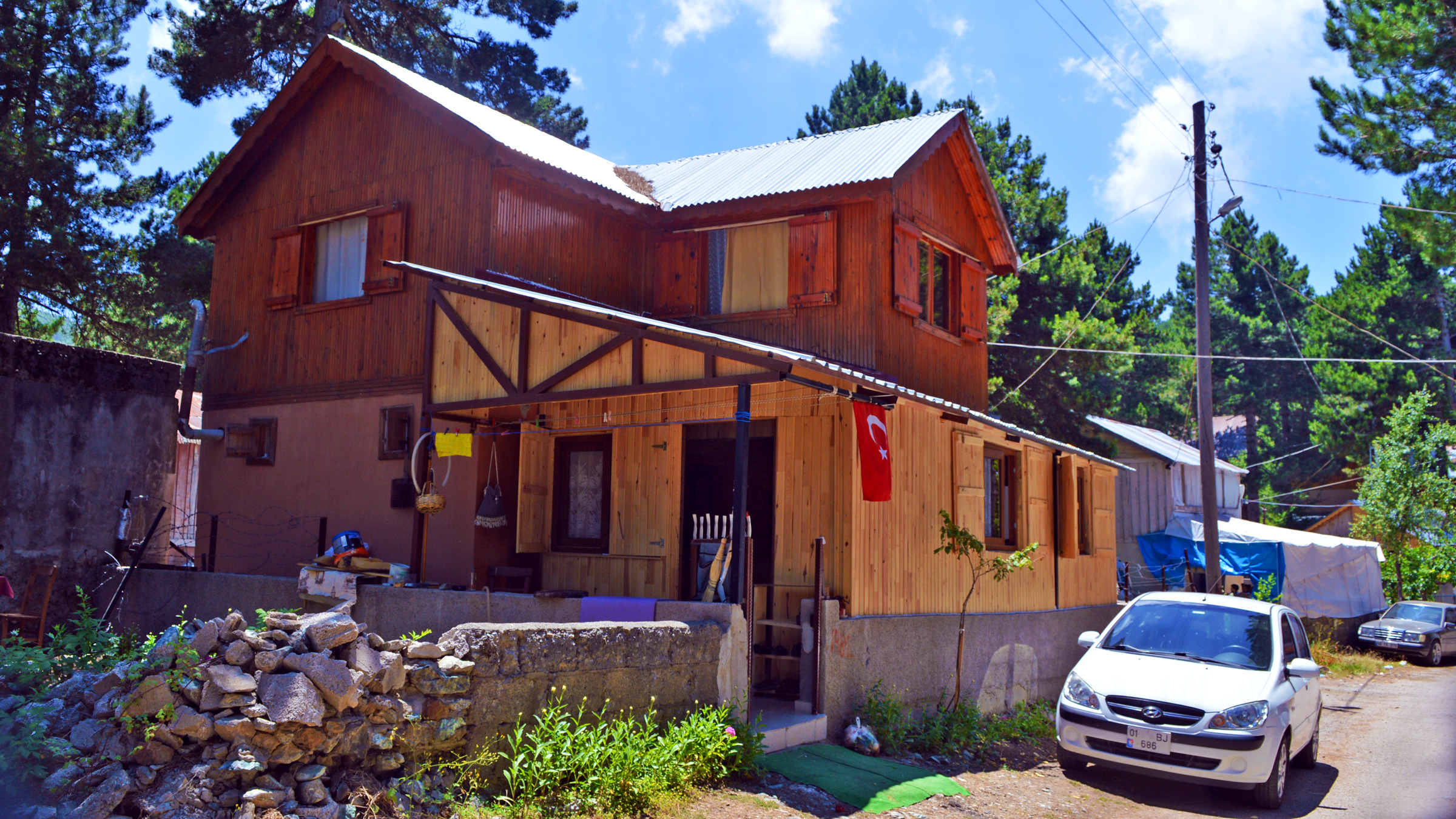
Zorkun Plateau architecture, A typical house of the region.

== See also ==
- Çukurova
