= List of power stations in Turkey =

The most important power stations in Turkey are listed here. Turkey generates about 300 TWh of electricity per year.

== High carbon emissions ==
=== Coal ===
All operational coal-fired power stations over 50 MW are listed below.

Five plants were shut down at the end of 2019 to reduce air pollution, leaving total installed capacity at about 17 GW, with 1.3 GW under construction. However, government may continue subsidizing some of the most polluting plants in 2020. In 2019 almost 500 million lira was paid to them.

In 2017, imported hard coal generated 51 TWh and local coal (almost all lignite) 44 TWh of electricity.

Hard coal is estimated to emit 1126 g CO_{2}-eq./kWh and lignite 1062 g CO_{2}-eq./kWh.

Power station	Capacity (MW)	CO_{2} emissions (Mt/year) (Note: Many of the values in the column for lignite power stations must be too low: this is partly because Carbon Brief has not taken into account the actual generation: this can be seen by the routine calculation of dividing the number in the generation column of List of active coal-fired power stations in Turkey by 1000 (because the average emission factor is 31 tCO_{2}/TJ for Turkish lignite, so it must emit well over 1000g CO_{2} per kWh) and noticing that it is larger than the number in this column. Similarly the value for Çatalağzı may be too high.)	Owner	Capacity mechanism payment (₺m)			
				2018	2019	2020	2021
Afşin-Elbistan B	1440	7.41	EÜAŞ				
Atlas Enerji İskenderun	1200	4.66	Atlas Enerji			eligible	eligible
Bolu Göynük	270	1.39	Kazancı Holding	30	40	eligible	eligible
Cenal	1320	5.04	Cenal Elektrik				eligible
Çatalağzı	315						eligible
Çayırhan	620	3.65	Ciner Group				
Yatağan	630	3.92	Bereket Enerji	70	94	eligible	eligible
Emba Hunutlu	1320		mainly Shanghai Electric Power Company also local investors				
Kangal	457						eligible
Kemerköy	630	3.78	Yeniköy Kemerköy Elektrik	70	94	eligible	eligible
Yeniköy	420	2.61	Yeniköy Kemerköy Elektrik	47	63	eligible	eligible
18 Mart Can	320	1.78	EÜAŞ				
Çan-2	330	1.54	ODAŞ Group	10	49	eligible	eligible
Orhaneli	210	1.26	Çelikler Holding	23	31	eligible	eligible
Tufanbeyli	450	2.32	Enerjisa		67	eligible	eligible
Soma	990	6.09	Anadolu Birlik Holding via tr:Konya Şeker	110	148	eligible	eligible
ZETES power stations	2790	10.98 total ZETES	Eren Enerji	13	10	eligible	eligible
İsken Sugözü	1320	5.35	tr:OYAK				
İzdemir Enerji	350	1.49	İzdemir Enerji			eligible	eligible
İÇDAŞ Bekirli-1	405	6.89 including İÇDAŞ Bekirli-2	İÇDAŞ	5	5	eligible	eligible
İÇDAŞ Bekirli-2	1200	included in İÇDAŞ Bekirli-1	İÇDAŞ				eligible
Şırnak Silopi	405	2.08	Ciner Group	45	61	eligible	eligible
Soma Kolin	510	2.76	Kolin Group		50	eligible	eligible
Seyitömer	600						eligible
Polat	51	0.26	Polatyol		8	eligible	eligible
Gebze Çolakoğlu	190		Çolakoğlu Metalurji			eligible	eligible
Totals:	18743	56.8		423	720		

== Medium carbon emissions ==
=== Natural gas ===
In 2020, about 68 TWh of electricity was generated from gas. As of 2021, according to the head of the Electricity Producers’ Association, natural gas plants did not have enough money for maintenance work.

Station	Location	Coordinates	Capacity (MW)	Construction year	Notes
Gebze	SAKARYA		1,631		
İzmir	İZMİR		1,520		
Bursa	BURSA		1,432		
Ambarlı A	İSTANBUL		1,351		
Hamitabat	KIRKLARELİ		1,220		
Habaş Aliağa	İZMİR		1,043		
Bandırma	BALIKESİR		936		
Kırıkkale	KIRIKKALE		927		
Erzin	HATAY		904		
Antalya	ANTALYA		900		
Bilgin Samsun Doğalgaz Kombine Çevrim Santrali	SAMSUN		887		
Yeni Doğalgaz Çevrim Santrali	KOCAELİ		865		
İç Anadolu Doğal Gaz Kombine Çevrim Enerji Santralı Projesi	KIRIKKALE		853		
Adapazarı Doğalgaz Kombine Çevrim Santrali	SAKARYA		818		
İstanbul Fuel Oil ve Doğal Gaz Kom. Çev. Sant. (B)	İSTANBUL		816		
Doğalgaz Kombine çevrim Enerji Santrali	DENİZLİ		797		
Ankara	ANKARA		770		
Cengiz 610 MW DGKÇS	SAMSUN		610		
Bandırma II Doğalgaz Kombine Çevrim Santrali	BALIKESİR		607		
Bursa	BURSA		486		
Tekirdağ	TEKİRDAĞ		956		
Kazan Doğalgaz Kojenerasyon Santrali	ANKARA		379		
Gebze Dilovası Doğal Gaz Kombine Çevrim Santrali	KOCAELİ		253		
Yeşilyurt Enerji Samsun Merkez OSB DGKÇS	SAMSUN		234		
AGE DGKÇS I	DENİZLİ		205		
Karadeniz Ereğli-Zonguldak	ZONGULDAK		195		
Esenyurt Termik Santrali	İSTANBUL		180		
Şanlıurfa OSB Enerji Santrali	ŞANLIURFA		147		
Aksa Santralı	YALOVA		145		
Taha DGKÇS	MARDİN		136		
Mersin Kojenerasyon Santrali	MERSİN		126		
Çolakoğlu-1 Termik Santrali	KOCAELİ		123		
İzmit-Köseköy Termik Santrali	KOCAELİ		112		
Kırklareli DGKÇ	KIRKLARELİ		82		
Ales DKÇS	AYDIN		62		
Delta Doğalgaz Kombine Çevrim Santrali	KIRKLARELİ		61		
Çorlu-Tekirdağ	TEKİRDAĞ		56		
Lüleburgaz-Kırklareli	KIRKLARELİ		50		
Kentsa gas power plant					

=== Geothermal ===
The CO_{2} emissions from new geothermal plants in Turkey are high but gradually decline: lifecycle emissions were still being researched as of 2019.

Station	Community	Coordinates	Capacity (MW)	Construction year
Kızıldere Geothermal Power Plant	Sarayköy, Denizli	37°57′00″N 28°50′35″E	95	1984
Gümüşköy Geothermal Power Plant	Germencik, Aydın	37°51′20″N 27°27′48″E	13.2	?

== Low carbon emissions ==
=== Hydroelectric ===
Station	Community	Coordinates	Capacity (MW)	Construction year
Alkumru Dam		37.959167°N 42.092778°E	265.5	2011
Altınkaya Dam	Kızılırmak Nehri	41.3632176°N 35.7240844°E	700	1988
Arkun Dam	İspir, Erzurum	40.676181°N 41.289192°E	237	2014
Artvin Dam	Artvin	40.933833°N 41.76975°E	340	2016
Aslantaş Dam	Uğurlu	40.9366319°N 36.64891°E	138	1984
Atatürk Dam	Eskin	37.4827592°N 38.3206129°E	2,400	1992
Batman Dam	Catakköprü	38.160088°N 41.201574°E	198	1999
Berke Dam	Düziçi, Osmaniye	37.373256°N 36.461347°E	510	1999
Birecik Dam	Belkıs	37.053333°N 37.89°E	672	2001
Borçka Dam	Borçka, Artvin	41.349722°N 41.687778°E	300	2006
Boyabat Dam	Boyabat	41.3386°N 35.001994°E	513	2012
Çatalan Dam	Adana	37.036612°N 35.3434038°E	169	1997
Çınarcık Dam		40.016497°N 28.772622°E	100	2002
Deriner Dam	Artvin	41.169722°N 41.870277°E	670	2012
Dicle Dam	Altayköy	38.34896°N 40.0222921°E	110	1997
Ermenek Dam		36.5682012°N 32.9681683°E	300	2009
Gezende Dam		36.5284501°N 33.1943536°E	159	1990
Gökçekaya Dam	Gökçekaya	40.0334307°N 31.0159492°E	278	1972
Hasan Uğurlu Dam	Uğurlu	40.9365508°N 36.6467857°E	500	1981
Hirfanlı Dam	Hirfanlar	39.2727631°N 33.5181069°E	128	1959
Ilısu Dam		37.531167°N 41.849653°E	1,200	2018
Karakaya Dam	Handere	38.2266006°N 39.1355324°E	1,800	1989
Karkamış Dam	Ziyaret	36.8679139°N 38.0338097°E	189	2000
Keban Dam	Keban	38.8064233°N 38.7589502°E	1,330	1974
Kığı Dam		39.368333°N 40.351944°E	180	2016
Kılıçkaya Dam	Yelkesen	40.2419787°N 38.1859016°E	124	1989
Köprü Dam		38.8064233°N 35.612483°E	148	2012
Menzelet Dam	Sarıçukur	37.6766708°N 36.8502045°E	248	1989
Muratlı Dam	Muratlı village, Artvin	41.468333°N 41.713333°E	115	2005
Obruk Dam		40.770278°N 34.788056°E	202	2007
Oymapinar Dam	Oymapınar-Manavgat	36.9086994°N 31.5318024°E	540	1984
Özlüce Dam	Yayladere, Bingöl	39.129722°N 40.087778°E	200	2000
Sarıyar Dam	Sarıyar	40.0397393°N 31.4141822°E	160	1956
Sır Dam	Küçüksır	37.5010445°N 36.5962744°E	284	1991
Torul Dam		40.635278°N 39.231111°E	121.5	2007
Yedigöze Dam		37.401506°N 35.445297°E	320	2011
Yusufeli Dam	Artvin	40.820278°N 41.661389°E	540	2018

=== Solar photovoltaic ===
As of 2021 there was 9 GW of solar PV.

Station name	Owner	Location	Planned capacity (MW)	Capacity (MW)	Construction year
Karapınar	Kalyon	Konya	1300	1000	2020 to 2023

=== Solar thermal ===
Station	Community	Coordinates	Capacity (MW)	Construction year
Greenway Mersin CSP			5	?

=== Wind ===
As of 2022, there were 280 wind farms in Turkey, of which 280 were active in production with a total installed capacity of 10.592 GW more than 10% of the total installed power capacity of the country.

Wind farms in Turkey
Name	Location	Province	Capacity (MW)	Year	Manufacturer
KARABURUN Wind Farm	İZMİR	KARABURUN	222.8	01.03.2018	
İstanbul Wind Farm	İSTANBUL	ÇATALCA	181.8	10.09.2020	
Albay Çiğiltepe Wind Farm	AFYONKARAHİSAR	DİNAR	172.6	16.03.2011	
Geycek Wind Farm	KIRŞEHİR		168	14.05.2008	
Balıkesir Wind Farm	BALIKESİR		142.5	18.04.2007	
Gökçedağ	OSMANİYE	BAHÇE	135	19.12.2003	
Saros Wind Farm	ÇANAKKALE		132.886	18.10.2012	
Kangal Wind Farm	SİVAS		128	12.04.2011	
Şamlı	BALIKESİR		126.5	06.04.2004	
Soma	MANİSA	Soma	120	18.04.2019	
Evrencik Wind Farm	KIRKLARELİ	VİZE	120	09.02.2012	
Aliağa	İZMİR	ALİAĞA	120	17.07.2008	
Tatlıpınar Wind Farm	BALIKESİR	MERKEZ	108	21.06.2012	
Şah Wind Farm	BALIKESİR	Bandirma	105	10.04.2008	
Kuşadası Wind Farm	Aydin	SÖKE	103.5	21.07.2011	
Bağlar Wind Farm	Konya	Merkez	100	21.06.2012	
Çanta			47.5		
Dağpazarı			39		
Mut			33		

=== Nuclear ===
Station	Community	Coordinates	Capacity (MW)	Construction year	Notes
Akkuyu Nuclear Power Plant		36.144893°N 33.540376°E	4800	?	Under construction
Sinop Nuclear Power Plant		42.085739°N 34.955378°E	4400		Cancelled

== See also ==
- List of power stations in Asia
- List of power stations in Europe
- List of largest power stations in the world
- Hydroelectricity in Turkey
- Wind power in Turkey
