= Wind power in Turkey =

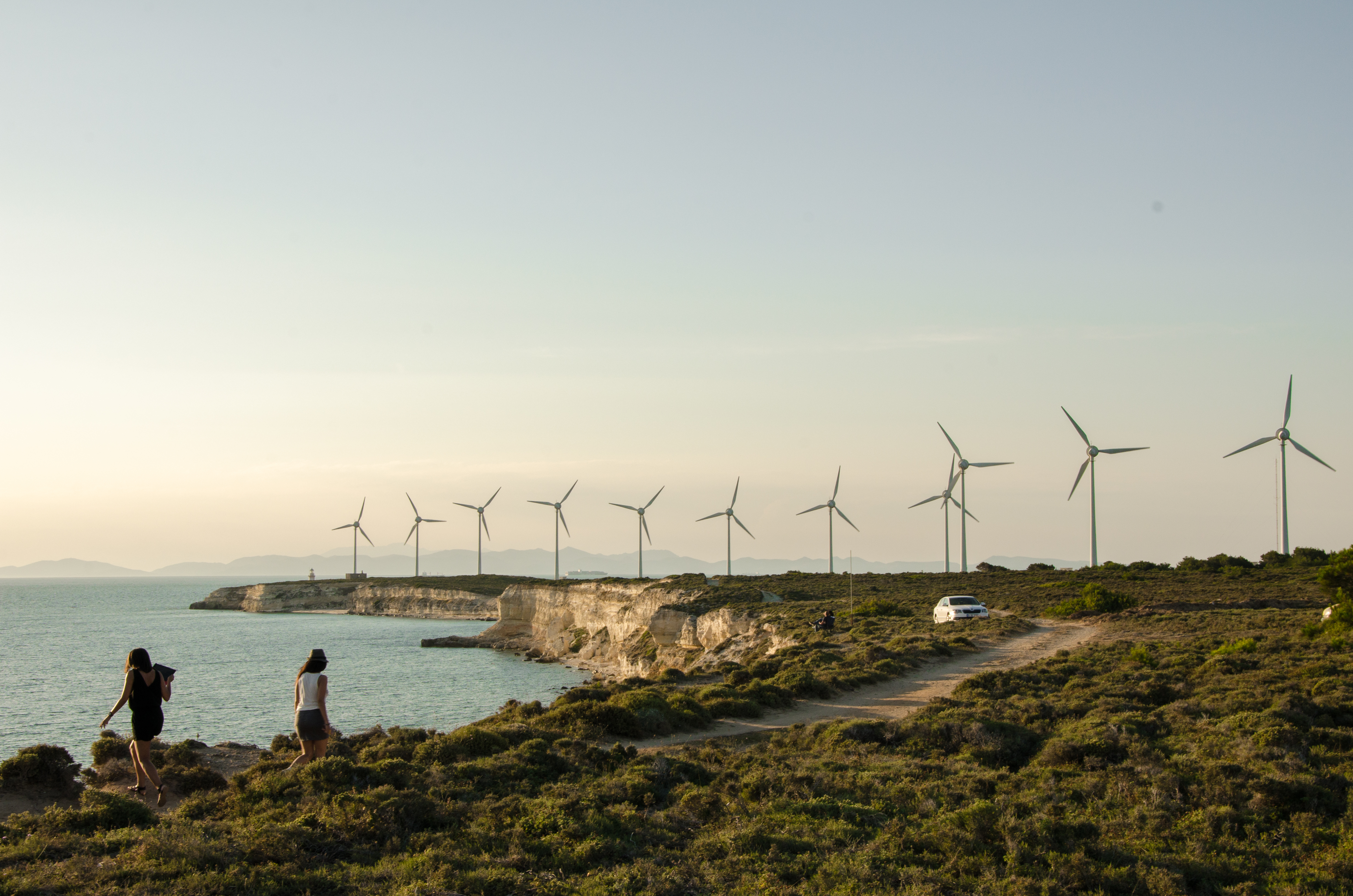
Wind turbines on the island of Bozcaada in the far west

Wind power installed capacity and generation in Turkey

Wind power generates about 10% of Turkey's electricity, mainly in the west in the Aegean and Marmara regions, and is gradually becoming a larger share of renewable energy in the country. As of 2025, Turkey has over 13 gigawatts (GW) of wind turbines. The Energy Ministry plans to have almost 30 GW by 2035, including 5 GW offshore.

In 2021, the state-owned Electricity Generation Company (EÜAŞ) had about 20% of the market, and there were many private companies. The highest ever daily share of wind power was 25%, in 2022.

Building new wind farms is cheaper than running existing coal plants which depend on imported coal. According to modelling by Carbon Tracker in 2020, new wind will be cheaper than all existing coal plants by 2027.

== History ==
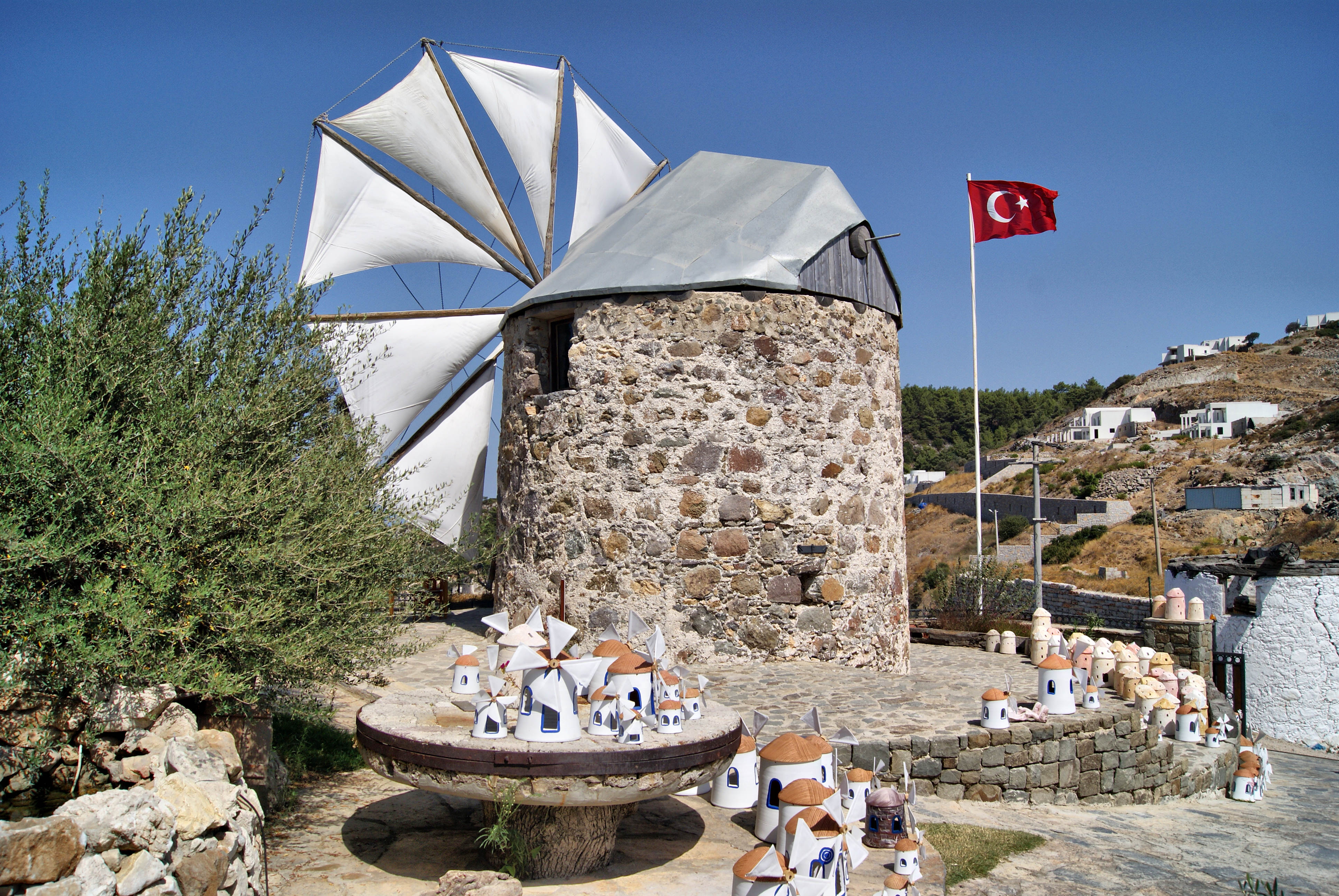
Historical windmill in Bodrum

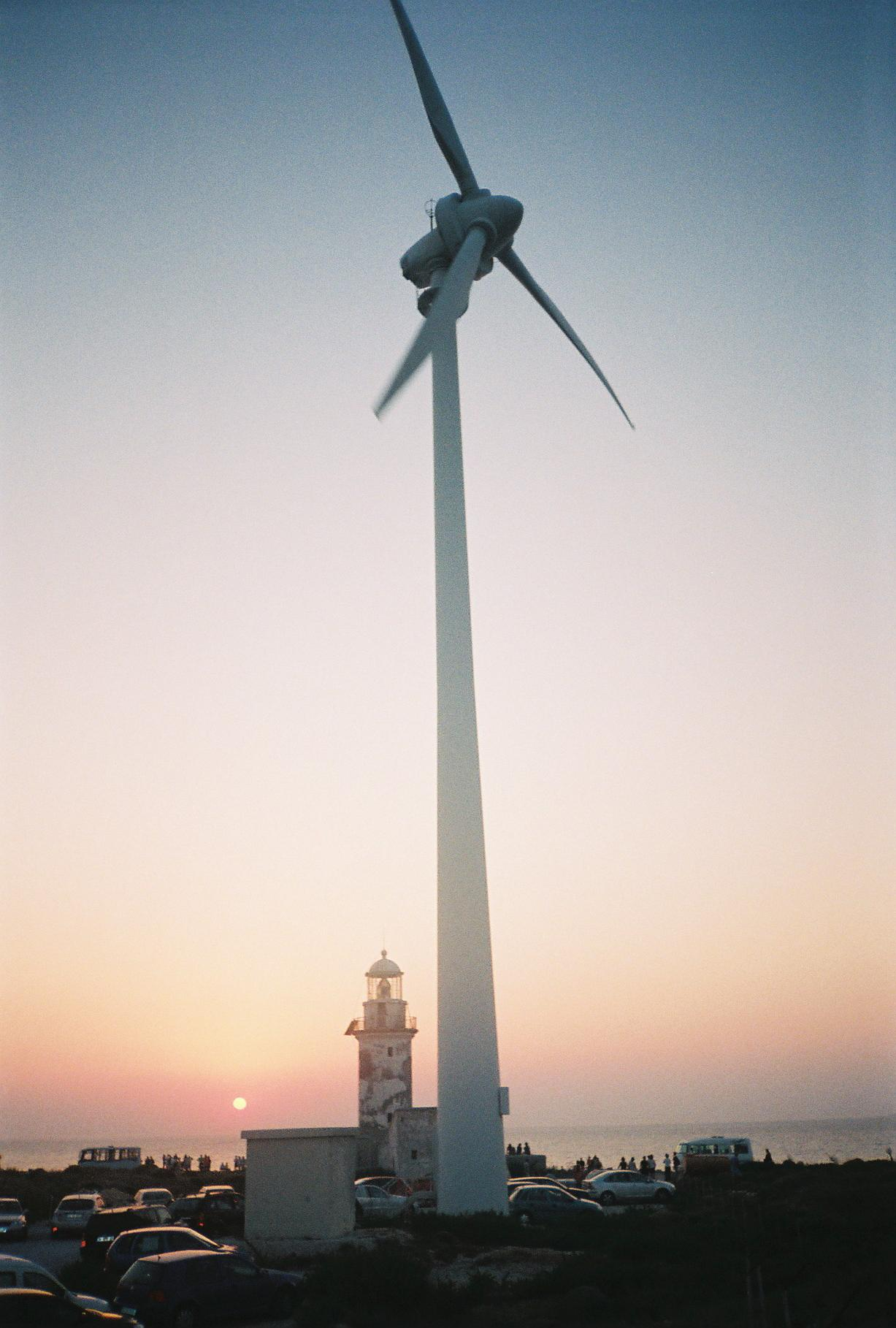
A wind turbine on Bozcaada island in the country's west, where most wind power is concentrated

Some of the earliest windmills were built 400 years ago out of stone. Using wind from the Aegean Sea, these mills were used to grind wheat into flour until the 1970s. On windy days a mill could grind 20 sacks of wheat (about 320 kg) in an hour, and corn and barley were also milled. Such historic windmills on the Bodrum Peninsula are being restored for tourism. Likewise, on Bozcaada, two derelict mills have been reconstructed and are used for tourist demonstrations.

The first wind farm was built in İzmir in 1998. While the installed capacity of wind power was 19 megawatts (MW) in 2006, it grew to 140 MW by 2007, and to over 1,600 MW by 2011. In the 2010s some windpower was used for carbon offsets.

The table below shows the subsequent growth of installed wind power capacity:

Installed wind power capacity in Turkey
Year	Capacity (GW)
2019	7.6
2020	8.8
2021	10.6
2022	11.4
2023	11.8
2024	13
2025	14

A wind turbine factory was completed in 2019, also in İzmir. In 2020 1.6 billion euros were invested in wind power. Hybrid generation became more popular in the early 2020s.

== Wind farms ==
There are almost 400 wind farms in Turkey, all onshore as of 2025, averaging over 10 turbines per farm. Capacity factor is around 33%. The company with the most wind power was Borusan EnBW Enerji, a joint venture between Borusan and Germany power utility Energie Baden-Wurttemberg. The maximum power of unlicensed installations is 5 MW. One billion euros was invested in 2021 and 1.4 GW built: average power rating was over 5 GW, which was higher than other European countries onshore. As of 2021 the largest wind farm in the country is Soma, followed by Karaburun.

=== Aliağa Wind Farm ===
Aliağa Wind Farm is an onshore wind power plant in Aliağa district of İzmir Province in western Turkey.

The wind farm consists of four fields operated by different companies. A total of 83 wind turbines have an installed output power of 193 MW generating about 480 GWh a year.

=== Bahçe Wind Farm ===
Bahçe Wind Farm or Gökçedağ Wind Farm is an onshore wind power plant in the Bahçe district of Osmaniye Province, in the eastern Mediterranean Region of Turkey. Consisting of 54 wind turbines with an installed output power of 135 MW in total, the wind farm was the country's largest one when it was commissioned in 2009.

The licence for the wind farm was obtained in 2003 and will expire in 2033. Construction works at the site began in 2008. It was constructed on Gökçedağ, a mountain between Bahçe and Hasanbeyli, south of the Osmaniye-Gaziantep highway D.400. It is operated by Rotor Co., a subsidiary of Zorlu Holding. The wind farm cost €200 million.

=== Çanta Wind Farm ===
Çanta Wind Farm is a 2014 wind power plant consisting of 19 wind turbines with a total installed capacity of 47.5 MW. The wind farm is in Çanta in the Silivri district of Istanbul Province, northwestern Turkey.

The wind farm was initially projected by Bora Wind Energy Company in 2011. After Boydak Energy Company took over Bora Co., construction began in 2012. The farm went into production in May 2014 with six turbines, each with a capacity to generate 2.5 MW. By the end of June 2014, eight more turbines were in service, increasing the total installed capacity to 35 MW.

=== Dağpazarı Wind Farm ===
Dağpazarı Wind Farm is a wind power plant consisting of 13 wind turbines in Dağpazarı in the Taurus Mountains in the Mut district of Mersin Province, southern Turkey. It came online in 2012.

=== Mut Wind Farm ===
Mut Wind Farm is a wind power plant consisting of eleven wind turbines situated on Mt. Magras in Özlü in the Mut district of Mersin Province in southern Turkey. The wind farm went into service in 2010.

=== Şamlı Wind Farm ===
Şamlı Wind Farm is an onshore wind power plant in Şamlı in Balıkesir Province in western Turkey.

The wind farm consists of three fields operated by different companies. A total of 91 wind turbines have an installed output power of 150 MW and generate about 375 GWh a year.

=== Soma Wind Farm ===
Soma Wind Farm is an onshore wind power plant in Soma in Manisa Province in the northwestern Aegean Region of Turkey. Built in two phases and consisting of 119 wind turbines with an installed output power of 140 MW in total, it is one of Turkey's largest wind farms.

The wind farm, distributed over a large mountainous terrain, extends over a land area of 123 km^{2} (47 sq mi). The wind farm was constructed and is operated by Polat Energy, a joint venture company of Polat Holding, which is owned by former Galatasaray S.K. president Adnan Polat, and the French company EDF Energies Nouvelles.

=== Planned and under construction ===
In 2022 contracts for 20 wind farms totalling 850 MW were auctioned at prices from 408 lira (USD 24/EUR 22) to 778 lira per MWh. However the government target of 20 GW by 2023 was not met. The government published a long-term National Energy Plan in 2023 which targets almost 30 GW by 2035.

=== Onshore wind potential ===
The Energy Ministry estimates onshore potential as 48 GW at 50 m altitude in places with wind speed over 7.5 m/s: the estimate assumes 5 MW capacity turbines. The north-west is the windiest, averaging about 7 m/s at 50 m high, and has the most wind farms. Mountain ranges in the west run at right angles to the coast, so wind flows easily inland. Also, the north-west uses a lot of energy, so there are only a few wind farms in other parts of the country.

A high-voltage direct current link from the windy islands of Bozcaada and Gokceada to Istanbul has been suggested. For an off-grid zero-energy house, an islanded hybrid system with solar and battery has been suggested. The politics of electricity generation are almost all about its price, not about wind power specifically. In general public opinion supports wind power, although sometimes locals complain of insufficient consultation.

=== Offshore wind potential ===
Technical potential is 12 GW fixed and 63 GW floating turbines. There is collaboration with Denmark to plan offshore wind power: the Marmara Sea is considered most suitable, but the Black Sea is also a possible location, as is the Aegean near Çanakkale. Floating turbines have been modelled because off many coasts depths increase quickly. A 2022 study suggested that the grid code needed improvements, specifically that "active power control and frequency regulation, reactive power control and voltage regulation, and voltage ride-through capabilities should be clarified in detail".

Areas off the coasts of Bandırma, Karabiga, Bozcaada and Gelibolu are being considered for Renewable Energy Resource Areas (YEKA). In 2023 Shura Energy Center made several recommendations for tendering.

== Environmental impact ==
Wind farms are prohibited on globally important bird migration routes (including critical migration bottlenecks such as İstanbul Strait, Çanakkale Strait, Belen in Hatay, Borçka in Artvin), some of which are high wind speed areas. On average one or two birds are estimated to be killed by each turbine each year, mostly small- and medium-size birds. However, the study found that the number of fatalities was not related to the number of birds or flights near the turbine. Environmental impact reports are more stringent for wind farms over 50 MW.

As the wind farms are relatively new and are assumed to operate for 25 years, their lifecycle environmental impact, such as what percentage of various metals will be recycled, is not yet known exactly. However, as their electricity is substituting that of coal and gas-fired power stations, it is certain that they are an overall good for the environment by helping to limit greenhouse gas (GHG) emissions by Turkey. Lifecycle GHG emissions have been estimated at 15 g CO_{2}eq/kWh (whereas fossil fuel power emits hundreds of g CO_{2} eq./kWh).

== Economics ==
The Turkish Wind Energy Association said in 2021 that over 20 thousand people were directly employed by the sector. According to a May 2022 report from think tank Ember, wind and solar saved 7 billion dollars on gas imports in the preceding 12 months.

=== Feed-in tariff ===
From 2005, there was a feed-in tariff in Turkish lira which met with poor market uptake. After being denominated in dollars from 2011 to 2020, the tariff reverted to lira with new rules. The feed-in tariff applies for 10 years. There are extra payments for domestic content.

=== Auctions ===
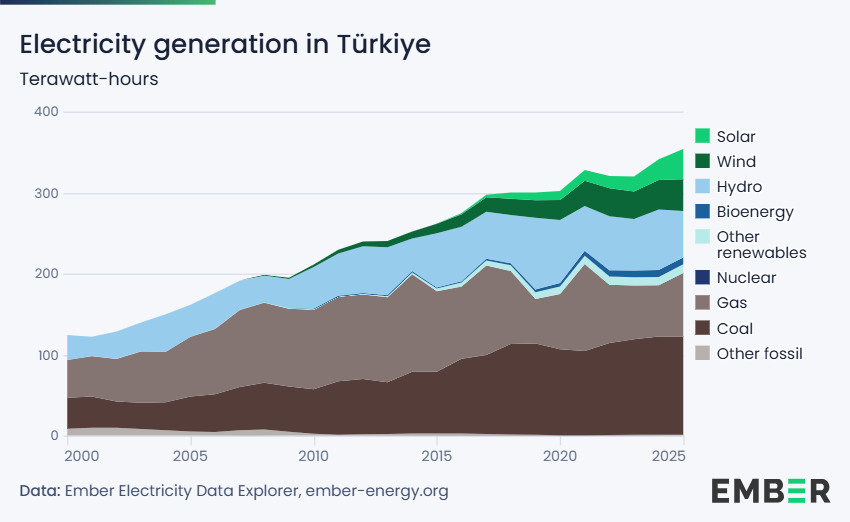
Electricity generation by wind (dark green) is increasing slowly.

In 2017, the Ministry of Energy and Natural Resources launched a US$1 billion wind power investment project, and issued a request for tender. The project, titled YEKA, was for wind farms in five different regions in the country with a total power capacity of 1 GW and at least 3 TWh energy generated annually, an extra 1% of electricity in Turkey.

The German-Turkish consortium of Siemens-Türkerler-Kalyon bid lowest at US$34.8 per MWh. The consortium is carrying out research and development, for ten years, on wind turbine blades, generator design, material technologies and production techniques, software and innovative gearboxes. The R&D is done by fifty technical personnel, 80% of whom are Turkish engineers, with a budget of US$5 million per year.

In 2019, the second 1 GW tender was won for four equal capacity projects in Balıkesir, Çanakkale, Aydın and Muğla, which are all provinces on the west coast. The same year the European Bank for Reconstruction and Development invested US$100 million in wind and solar power in Turkey. As of 2020 auction prices were around US$40 per MWh. Think tank Ember say that energy policy should be changed to auction for far more solar and wind power.

Since April 2022, low-cost generators such as wind have had their wholesale prices capped (this does not affect unlicensed and FiT): this can be considered a type of windfall tax. As of 2022 it is unclear whether the money will be a general tax or will be used to subsidise high-cost generators such as gas.

Merchant projects have won licences with negative bids (meaning the companies pay the government for licences) and are expected to come online in the mid-2020s.

=== Manufacturing ===
Nacelles are manufactured locally by Siemens, but most wind turbines are imported. Over half of the supply chain is local, from about 80 companies. It has been estimated that there is potential for about 240 million tons of green hydrogen to be produced by electrolysis of water by wind power.

== See also ==
- Energy law
- Energy in Turkey#Policy and regulation
