= Hamitabat power station =

Gas fired power station in Turkey

Hamitabat CCGT Power Plant
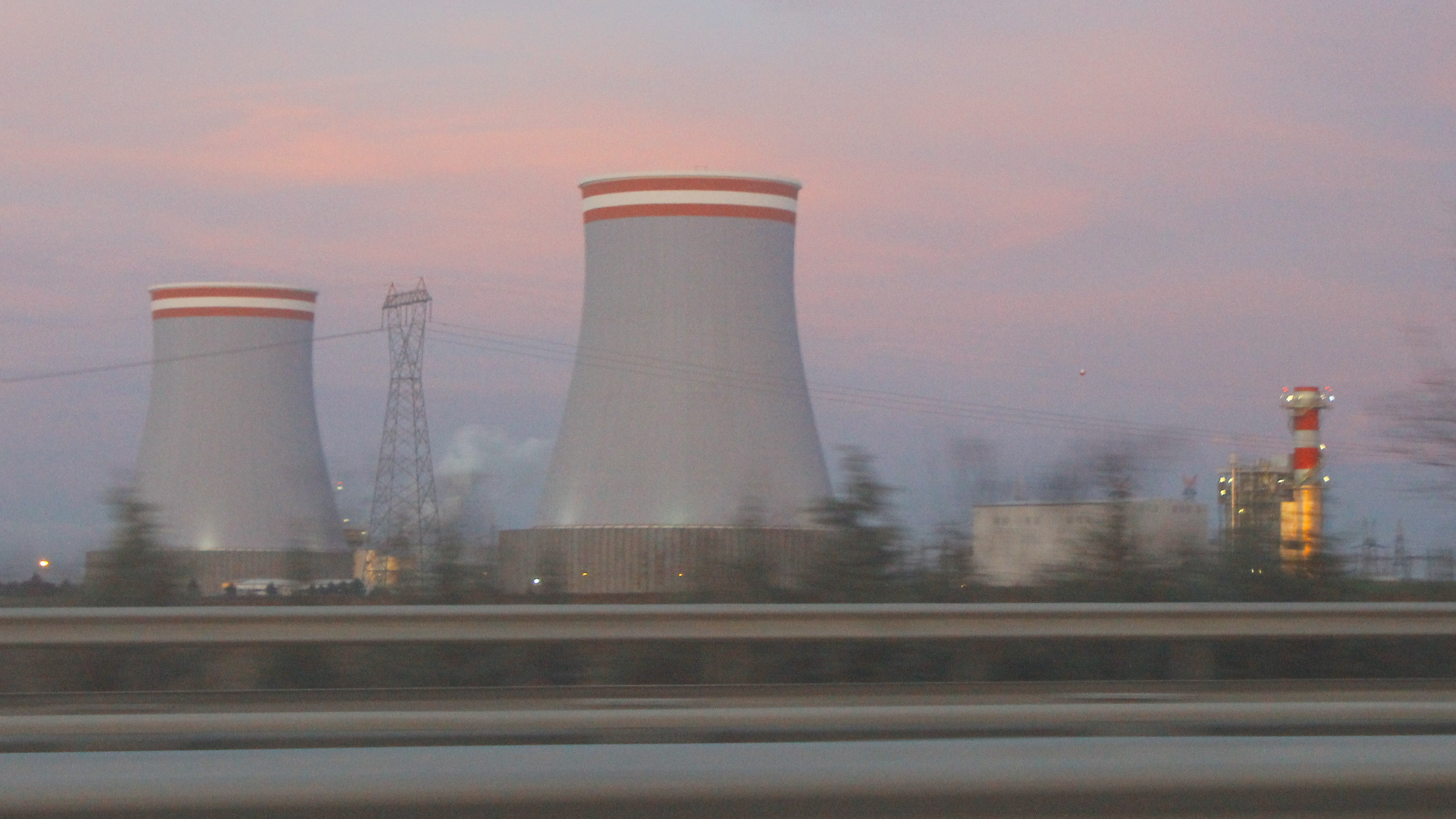
- Country: Turkey
- Coordinates: 41°28′54″N 27°20′14″E
- Status: Operational
- Commission date: 1985
- Owner: Limak Holding
- Combined cycle?: Yes

Power generation
- Nameplate capacity: 1,220 MW

External links
- Commons: Related media on Commons

Hamitabat power station (Turkish: Hamitabat Doğal Gaz Kombine Çevrim Santrali) is a gas-fired power station in Kırklareli Province northwestern Turkey, and is the oldest gas-fired power station in the country. Climate Trace estimates that in 2022 it emitted over 1.5 million tonnes of greenhouse gas, more that any other gas-fired power station in the country except Bandırma.

== Technology ==
Hamitabat is a combined cycle power plant.

== Customers ==
The plant supplies the Marmara region.

== Finance ==
Limak received capacity payments for the plant in 2020.
