= Aliaga Habas power station =

Gas fired power station in Turkey

Habaş/Aliağa gas power plant
- Country: Turkey
- Coordinates: 38°44′29″N 26°56′47″E

Power generation
- Nameplate capacity: 1,043 MW

External links
- Website: www.habas.com.tr/Category/Alias/energy

Aliaga Habas power station (Turkish: Habaş/ Aliağa-DGKÇ Santrali) is a gas-fired power station in İzmir Province in western Turkey. Like the nearby İzmir gas power plant it is one of the few gigawatt scale power stations in Turkey. However İzmir has a lot of potential for more solar, wind and geothermal energy. Because hydropower is almost all much further east gas is the main source of flexible power in western Turkey and, as of 2022, gas is expensive: geothermal could be made more flexible to balance an increase in solar and wind.
