= Canta (disambiguation) =

Canta is a town in Peru.

Canta or variants may also refer to:

== Places ==
- Cantá, Brazil
- Çanta, Silivri, Turkey
  - Çanta Wind Farm
- Canta District, Peru
- Canta Province, Peru

== Other uses ==
- Canta (magazine), of the University of Canterbury Students' Association, New Zealand
- Canta (vehicle), a vehicle designed for disabled drivers
