= Bahçe railway station =

BAHÇE
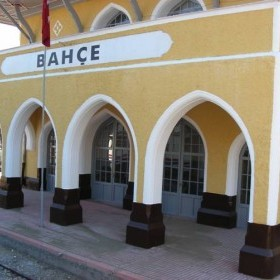
- Bahçe railway station

General information
- Location: İstiklal mah., Bahçe, Osmaniye Province, Turkey
- Coordinates: 37°12′04″N 36°34′42″E
- Owner: TCDD

Construction
- Parking: Yes

History
- Opened: 1913

Services
Preceding station	TCDD Taşımacılık	Following station
Yarbaşı towards Adana	Euphrates Express	Bahçeşehir towards Elazığ
Location
- Location within Turkey

Bahçe station is a railway station in Turkey. It is located at 37°12′04″N 36°34′42″E in Bahçe ilçe (district) of Osmaniye Province.

Main passenger in the station is Fırat Express (Adana-Elazığ train).
