= Kırıkkale power station =

Gas fired power station in Turkey

Acwa Power Kırıkkale gas power plant
- Country: Turkey
- Coordinates: 39°53′05″N 33°24′30″E

Power generation
- Nameplate capacity: 927 MW

Kırıkkale power station or Yahşihan power station is a gas-fired power station in Kırıkkale Province in central Turkey, which was completed in 2017. At 950 MW it is one of the larger power stations in Turkey and is owned by ACWA Power. Climate Trace estimates that in 2022 it emitted nearly 900 thousand tonnes of greenhouse gas.
