= Burç Bendi Dam =

- Location within Turkey
- Country: Turkey
- Location: Burç, Adıyaman district, Adıyaman Province
- Coordinates: 37°28′6.45″N 38°10′14.44″E
- Purpose: Power
- Status: Operational
- Construction began: January 2008
- Opening date: November 2010
- Owner: ČEZ Group

Dam and spillways
- Type of dam: Gravity
- Impounds: Peri River
- Height (foundation): 47 m (154 ft)
- Length: 152.5 m (500 ft)
- Dam volume: 67,000 m^{3} (88,000 cu yd)

Reservoir
- Total capacity: 26,600,000 m^{3} (21,600 acre⋅ft)

Burç Bendi HES
- Coordinates: 37°27′48.95″N 38°10′18.32″E
- Commission date: 2010
- Type: Run-of-the-river
- Hydraulic head: 29.19 m (95.8 ft) (rated)
- Turbines: 3 x 9.3 MW vertical Kaplan-type
- Installed capacity: 27.9 MW
- Annual generation: 44.13 GWh

The Burç Bendi Dam is a gravity dam on the Göksu River (a tributary of the Euphrates), near the village of Burç in Adıyaman district, Adıyaman Province, Turkey. Its primary purpose is hydroelectric power generation and it supports a 27.9 MW run-of-the-river power station. Construction on the dam began in January 2008 and it was fully operational by 3 November 2010. The 57 m (187 ft) tall concrete dam withholds a reservoir of 26,600,000 m^{3} (21,600 acre⋅ft). Water is diverted through a 536 m (1,759 ft) long tunnel to the power station downstream which contains three 9.3 vertical Kaplan turbine-generators. It is owned and operated by ČEZ Group.

== See also ==
- List of dams and reservoirs in Turkey
