= Özlü, Mut =

Özlü
- Neighbourhood
- Location in Turkey
- Coordinates: 36°43′N 33°14′E
- Country: Turkey
- Province: Mersin
- District: Mut
- Elevation: 780 m (2,560 ft)
- Population (2022): 197
- Time zone: UTC+3 (TRT)
- Postal code: 33600
- Area code: 0324

Özlü is a neighbourhood in the municipality and district of Mut, Mersin Province, Turkey. Its population is 197 (2022). The village is situated to the south of Magras mountain (a part of Toros Mountains) where Mut Wind Farm is located. Distance to Mut is 28 kilometres (17 mi) and to Mersin is 193 kilometres (120 mi).
