= Pembelik Dam =

- Location within Turkey
- Country: Turkey
- Location: Karakoçan district, Elazığ Province
- Coordinates: 39°5′0.81″N 39°53′43.35″E
- Purpose: Power
- Status: Operational
- Construction began: 2009
- Opening date: 2015
- Owner: Limak Energy/Bilgin Energy

Dam and spillways
- Type of dam: Embankment, gravity section
- Impounds: Peri River
- Height (foundation): 88 m (289 ft)
- Height (thalweg): 81 m (266 ft)
- Length: 500 m (1,600 ft)
- Dam volume: 838,000 m^{3} (1,096,000 cu yd)

Reservoir
- Total capacity: 358,310,000 m^{3} (290,490 acre⋅ft)

Power Station
- Commission date: 2015
- Type: Conventional
- Hydraulic head: 77 m (253 ft) (gross)
- Turbines: 2 x 63.5 MW Francis-type
- Installed capacity: 127 MW
- Annual generation: 410 GWh (est.)

The Pembelik Dam is a gravity dam on the Peri River (a tributary of the Euphrates), in Karakoçan district of Elazığ Province, Turkey. Its primary purpose is hydroelectric power generation and is the fourth dam in the Peri River cascade. Construction on the dam began in 2009 and its two generators were commissioned in February/March 2015. The 88 m (289 ft) tall roller-compacted concrete dam faced opposition from locals and construction was briefly suspended in 2014. It is owned and operated by Limak Energy and Bilgin Energy.

== See also ==
- Özlüce Dam – upstream
- Seyrantepe Dam – downstream
