= Yedisu Dam =

- Location within Turkey
- Country: Turkey
- Location: Kiğı district, Bingöl Province
- Coordinates: 39°16′35.09″N 40°22′22.41″E
- Purpose: Power, regulation
- Status: Operational
- Construction began: 2009
- Opening date: 2012
- Owner: Özaltın Energy

Dam and spillways
- Type of dam: Embankment, gravity section
- Impounds: Peri River
- Height: 44 m (144 ft)

Power Station
- Commission date: 2011
- Type: Run-of-the-river
- Turbines: 3
- Installed capacity: 24 MW
- Annual generation: 28 GWh (2014)

The Yedisu Dam is an earth-fill embankment dam on the Peri River (a tributary of the Euphrates), in Kiğı district of Bingöl Province, Turkey. Its primary purpose is hydroelectric power generation and is the second dam in the Peri River cascade. Construction on the dam began in 2009 and its power station was commissioned in 2011. The entire project was inaugurated in 2012. It is owned and operated by Özaltın Energy.

== See also ==
- Kığı Dam – upstream
- Özlüce Dam – downstream
