= ENKA Schools =

- Istinye, Istanbul; Turkey

Information
- Type: Private, Coeducational, Bilingual
- Established: September 1996
- Principal: Selcen Özkaya Seçil, Hüsnü Yılmaz, Nilay Yıldırım, Gözde Olcay Koçak
- Founder's Representative and Chair of Executive Committee: Alparslan Tansuğ
- Faculty: 200
- Enrollment: 1300 (Total in Pre-School, Primary School, Middle School, and High School)
- Campus: İstinye, Istanbul
- Colors: Blue and white
- Nickname: ENKA
- Website: http://www.enka.k12.tr/istanbul

ENKA Schools is a private coeducational, PK-12 day school located in Istanbul, Turkey. Since its establishment in 1996, Enka Schools in Istanbul, Turkey, has grown to accommodate approximately 1250 students from pre-k to grade 12. Located on 16 acres in the Sadi Gülçelik Spor Sitesi in the center of Istanbul's business district, the campus also houses the ENKA Foundation, the ENKA Culture and Arts Foundation, and the ENKA Sport Club with its significant athletic facilities. ENKA Schools is fully authorized by the IBO as an IB World School and is authorized to offer the IB Primary Years Program, IB Middle Years Program, and IB Diploma Program. ENKA Schools is internationally accredited by CIS and NEASC.

== General information ==
Since its beginnings in 1996 with just over 200 students, the first ENKA School in Istanbul has moved to the main campus within the Sadi Gülçelik Sports Complex and rapidly expanded. There are currently 1250 students from Pre-School to grade 12. The school has four divisions: Pre-School (ages 3–5), Primary School (grades 1-4), Middle School (grades 5-8), and High School (grades Prep-12).

While the ENKA Foundation makes a substantial contribution to support the school, the school exists as an independent non-profit corporation directed by an unsalaried Executive Committee, which is in turn reviewed by a voluntary Board of Directors.

The academic program implements both Turkish and English as the languages of instruction. In addition, all students study a third language from grades 5-12: French, German, or Spanish. The curriculum enables graduating students to meet all the requirements for the International Baccalaureate. The ENKA Foundation provides scholarships to more than 20 students a year.

The school offers extracurricular activities such as chess, robotics, dance, performing arts, and outdoor pursuits such as orienteering and camping (part of the Duke of Edinburgh International Award).

Students of the school share the training grounds with ENKA Sports Club for use in their physical education classes. In addition, about 600 students participate in the after schools program five days a week. Exceptional students are coached to national and international competition level. Many students are members of the Turkish National Team for their sport or activity, including chess.

=== History ===
In 1994, with the support of Sinan Tara, Vice-Chairman of Enka İnşaat ve Sanayi A.Ş., encouraged by activist and businessman Ibrahim Betil, the school was founded in 1996 in the cultural capital of the country as a private nonprofit center of educational excellence to provide an inspirational model for schools both within Turkey and throughout the international educational community. The first high school graduating class was the class of 2008.

Since opening in September 1996, with just over 200 students, ENKA Schools rapidly expanded its main campus on the Sadi Gülçelik Sports Site in Istinye. There are currently 1250 students from Pre-School to grade 12.

Immediately after the earthquake on August 17, 1999, ENKA Foundation joined the nation's collective effort to provide relief to victims by building schools as quickly as possible; the Adapazarı ENKA School is one of them.

=== Governance ===
The Board of Directors of ENKA Schools includes the following members: Alparslan Tansuğ (Board Chair and Founder's Representative), Esra Tara and Onur Kaya of Enka İnşaat ve Sanayi A.Ş.

Board Chair and Founder's Representative, Alparslan Tansuğ has a BS degree from the department of Business Administration of Middle East Technical University. Doctor of Neuroscience, Esra Tara is the granddaughter of the founder of Enka İnşaat ve Sanayi A.Ş., Şarık Tara. Onur Kaya holds a BSc degree in Civil Engineering from Middle East Technical University and a MSc degree in Civil and Environmental Engineering from the University of Stuttgart.

=== Campus and Facilities ===
The campus is situated on Istanbul's European side on 16 acres within the ENKA Sports Complex. The range of facilities demonstrates the importance ENKA places on contemporary education, sports, and the arts. The school's campus includes three full science labs, 3 libraries totaling 40,000 volumes, computer labs, a multimedia room, and contemporary purpose-built classrooms. In addition to these, it has a theater/auditorium, an amphitheater, an art gallery, 2 indoor pools, an outdoor Olympic sized pool, 12 tennis courts, a full gymnasium, a fitness center, and a tartan track and field ring.

=== Faculty and Student Body ===
Over 10% of students are dual citizens with 100% of students continuing on to higher education. Approximately 75% attend universities abroad. Nearly 25% of High School students are recipients of academic scholarships. All successful 2018 academic scholarship candidates scored in the top 1.3% for the nation in Turkey's High School Entrance Exam.

The teaching faculty are a mix of national and international educators. Foreign teachers from 13 nations account for 40% of the faculty.

=== Recent Academic Distinctions ===
2019- 1st place (Girls U17), and 3rd Place (Boys U17) European Chess Championship for Schools
2018- 3rd place in Turkey and Most Original Design Award- NASA’s Jet Propulsion Laboratory’s Invention Challenge
2018- 6th place in the world- World Schools Individual Chess Championships
2018- 2nd place in Europe- European School Chess Championship
2018- Highest Rookie Seed Award, 2018 Finalist, and America Houston Finals Invitation Award- FIRST Robotics Competition Regionals
2018- King Constantine Medal (Round Square)
2018- Kurt Hahn International Prize (Round Square)
2017- 1st Place in the TEAMS Competition (Tests of Engineering Aptitude, Mathematics & Science)
2017- 2nd place in the world- Genius Olympiad, USA

=== Recent Athletic Distinctions ===
2019- 3rd Place Turkish High Schools Fencing Championship
2019- 1st Place National Biathlon (U17)
2019- 1st Place Turkish Nationals (U17) Swimming Championship 4x50M Mixed Relay
2019- 1st Place Turkish Nationals (U17) Swimming Championship 6x50M Medley Relay
2019- 1st Place Turkish Nationals (U17) Swimming Championship 200m Individual Medley
2019- 2nd Place International (U17) Swimming Championship 200m Individual Medley
2019- 2nd Place International (U17) Swimming Championship 200m 100m Butterfly
2019- 1st Place International (U17) Swimming Championship 200m 4 × 100 m Medley Relay (Butterfly)
2018- 2nd Place in Turkey Modern Pentathlon
2018- 2nd Place in Turkey overall in the National Track & Field Championships
2018- 1st Place in Turkey long jump in the National Track & Field Championships
2017- 1st Place in Turkey (U16) Slalom, Giant Slalom, and Parallel in the Turkish National Skiing Championship

=== Extracurricular Activities ===
Clubs and Afterschool Activities

Academic Activities:
• Chess
• Cinema
• Creative Writing
• FLL Robotics
• FRC Robotics
• Jr. Entrepreneurs
• Lego Robotics
• Model United Nations Athletic Activities:
• Aikido
• Basketball
• Ballet
• Dance
• Fencing
• Football
• Table Tennis
• Taekwondo
• Tennis
• Track & Field
• Volleyball
• Sailing
• Swimming Arts Activities:
• Ceramics
• Chamber Orchestra
• Drama
• Flute
• Guitar
• Improv
• Piano
• Rock Band
• Theater Creative Activities:
• Destination Imagination
• French Cooking
• Italian Cooking
• Orienteering
• Student Magazine
• Minecraft Sustainability Activities:
• İyILIK Bone Marrow Project
• Nature Club
• Permaculture
• World Wildlife Fund
