= Sadi Gülçelik =

Turkish basketball player, civil engineer and entrepreneur

Personal information
- Born: 22 October 1930 Istanbul, Turkey
- Died: 19 August 1980 (aged 49) Riyadh, Saudi Arabia

Career history
- Galatasaray Basketball
- Karagücü
- Modaspor

Sadi Gülçelik (22 October 1930–19 August 1980) was a Turkish basketball player, civil engineer and entrepreneur.

== Biography ==
Sadi Gülçelik was born in Istanbul, Turkey on 22 October 1930. He played for Galatasaray Volleyball and Galatasaray Basketball, which was nicknamed "The invincible Armada" (Turkish: Yenilmez Armada). Gülçelik was also part of the basketball teams Karagücü and Modaspor. He participated at the 1952 Summer Olympics in Helsinki, Finland. He scored 206 points in total for the Turkey national basketball team.

He graduated from Istanbul Technical University as a civil engineer and established Enka Construction Co. with his brother-in-law Şarık Tara in 1957.

Gülçelik died in an air disaster in Riyadh, Saudi Arabia, on 19 August 1980.

A sports complex, Enka Sadi Gülçelik Spor Sitesi, in Sarıyer, Istanbul, is named in his honor.
