= Adapazarı-Gebze power plant =

Gas-fired power station in Turkey

Enka Gebze gas power plant
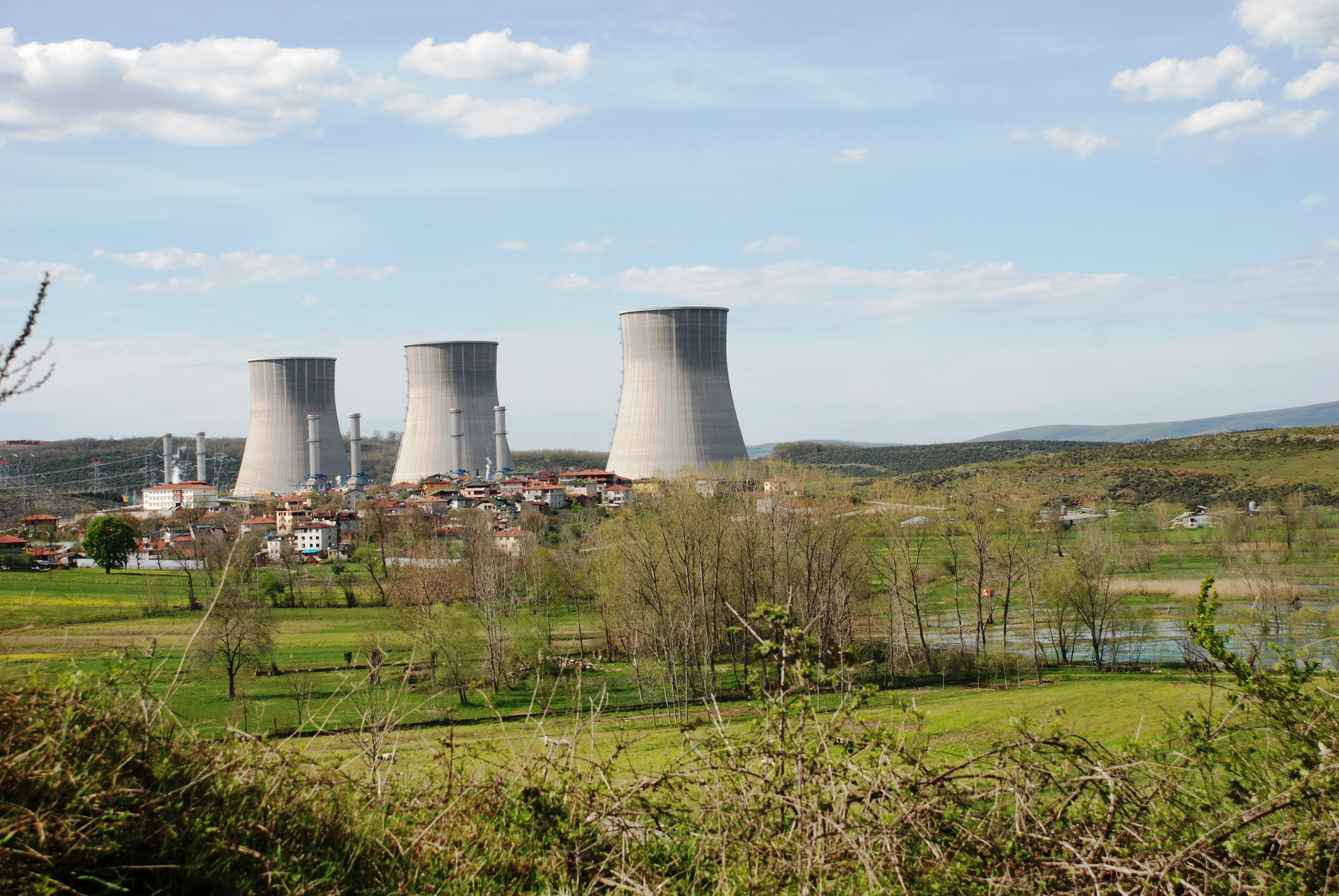
- Country: Turkey
- Coordinates: 40°51′56″N 30°23′31″E
- Owner: Enka İnşaat ve Sanayi A.Ş.
- Operator: Enka İnşaat ve Sanayi A.Ş.
- Combined cycle?: Yes

Power generation
- Nameplate capacity: 2,449 MW

Adapazarı-Gebze power plant (Turkish: Enkapower Adapazarı-Gebze Kombine Çevrim Santralleri) is a gas-fired power station in Sakarya Province northwestern Turkey.

Consisting of three equal-sized close-together units, all opened in 2002, it is licensed as two power plants, namely Gebze (2 units licence number EÜ/8154-3/04120) and Adapazarı (1 unit licence number EÜ/8154-4/04121).
