= Kızıldere Geothermal Power Plant =

Electrical power station in Turkey

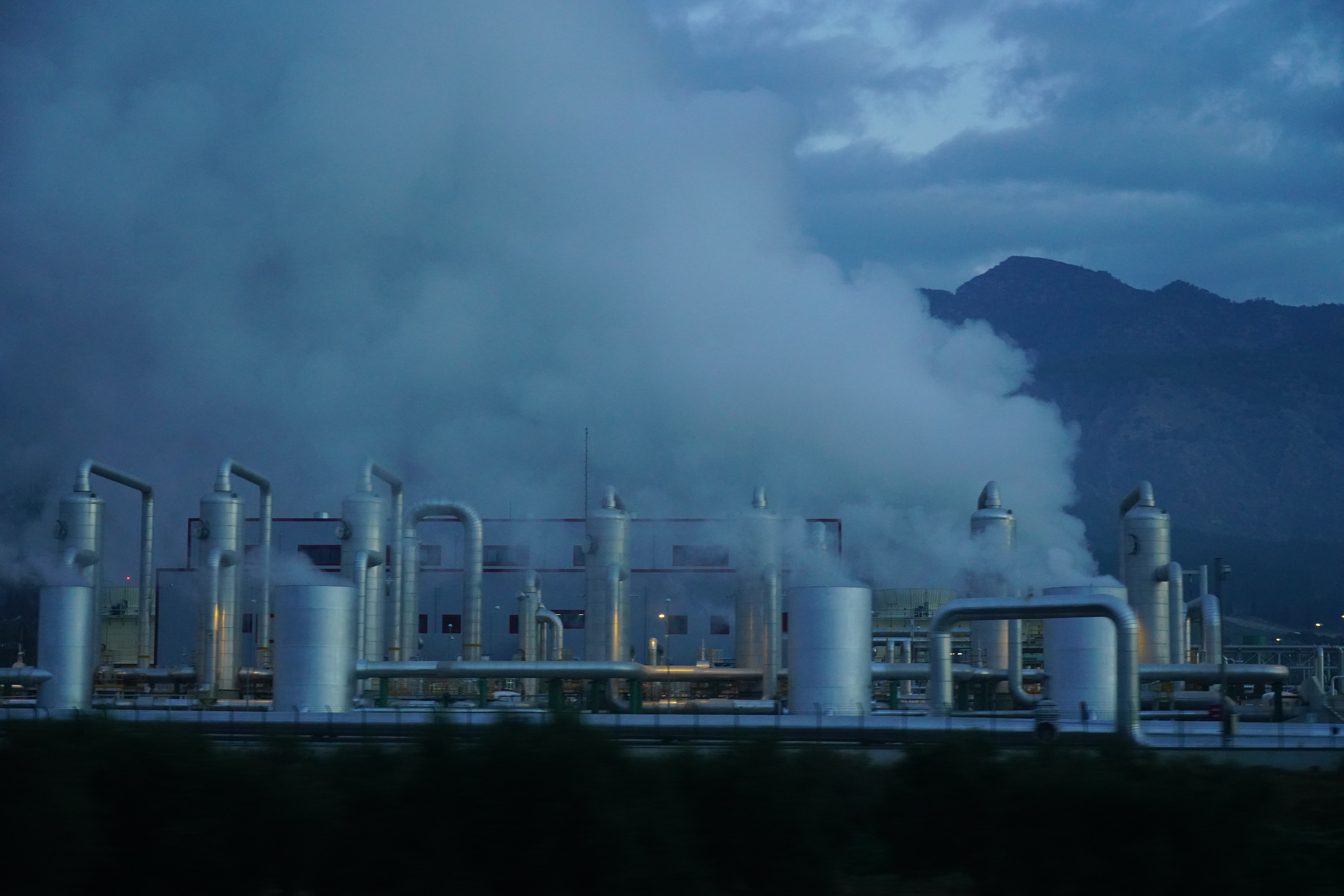
- Official name: Kızıldere Jeotermal Elektrik Santrali
- Country: Turkey
- Location: Kızıldere, Sarayköy, Denizli Province
- Coordinates: 37°57′00″N 28°50′35″E
- Status: Operational
- Commission date: 1984; 42 years ago
- Construction cost: US$250 million
- Operator: Zorlu Energy Inc.

Power generation
- Nameplate capacity: 95 MW
- Annual net output: 575 GWh

The Kızıldere Geothermal Power Plant (Turkish: Kızıldere Jeotermal Elektrik Santrali) is a geothermal power plant located at Kızıldere village of Sarayköy district in Denizli Province, southwestern Turkey. The initial power plant with 15 MW installed capacity was expanded in the second phase about 80 MW to 95 MW in total, making the facility Turkey's biggest geothermal power plant. It is planned to expand the power plant in a third and fourth phase.

== History ==
The power plant began its operation as a prototype system with the installation of a 500 kW turbine generator group in 1974. The facility generated electricity and distributed it to the households of villages in the vicinity for four years free of charge. In 1984, the state-owned company Elektrik Üretim A.Ş. (EÜAŞ) built a power plant with 17.4 MW installed capacity and put it into service. However, the geothermal power plant has produced 10 MW on average since its opening in 1984.

In September 2008, Zorlu Energy Inc. (Zorlu Doğal Elektrik Üretim A.Ş.), a subsidiary of Zorlu Holding, acquired the facility from Ankara Doğal Elektrik Üretim ve Ticaret A.Ş. (ADÜAŞ) as part of a privatisation process with seven other hydroelectric power plants across the country. Zorlu Energy Inc. obtained the operating lease right for a runtime of 30 years. The company announced that they increased the actual power capacity from 6 MW to 14 MW in three months, and added that they plan to raise the capacity to 60 MW within three years in the next phase.

With the initiative of the governmental Electrical Power Resources Survey and Development Administration (Turkish: Elektrik İşleri Etüt İdaresi, EIE), a research project was started by Zorlu Petrogas Oil &Gas group. After the oil and gas assets were sold to Transatlantic Petroleum, the project was carried out by Zorlu Geothermal Company in cooperation with the Hacettepe University and the Middle East Technical University (ODTÜ) to increase the electricity production from the geothermal field.

For the investment capital of the planned capacity increase, which amounts to US$230 million, the company received a credit from the banks Akbank and Garanti Bank in October 2010 with a backpayment term of 12 years.

In December 2011, the provincial administration allocated 70 decares (70,000 m^{2}; 750,000 sq ft) land needed for the construction site of the geothermal power plant expansion. The project forecast 575 GWh annual electrical energy generation, and a contribution to the country's economy at US$60 million yearly. The geothermal fluid would be used also in dry ice production and for heating in greenhouses and households in the villages around the power plant.

The construction of the Kızıldere Geothermal Power Plant was completed in 2013, and it went into service. On September 29, 2013, a ceremonial opening took place in presence of Prime Minister Recep Tayyip Erdoğan, Minister Energy and Natural Resources Taner Yıldız, other high-ranked politicians and officials. The construction cost US$250 million.

== Kızıldere Geothermal Reservoir ==
Kızıldere geothermal field is situated at the western branch of Büyük Menderes Graben within the limits of Denizli Province. It is Turkey's first and high-potential geothermal field explored for energy generation purposes.

The first geological and geophysical surveys in the Kızıldere geothermal field began in 1965, and were carried out by the state-owned Turkish Mineral Research and Exploration Co. (MTA). The first geothermal reservoir was discovered in 1968 with a geothermal well drilled in 540 m (1,770 ft) depth, which had a source temperature of 198 °C (388 °F). In the years from 1968 to 1973, a total of 16 geothermal wells were drilled to depths ranging between 370–1,241 m (1,214–4,072 ft). Six of the 17 geothermal wells were found feasible for electricity generation.

Lithologically, the Kızıldere geothermal reservoir is surrounded by marble and limestone rocks containing plentiful carbon dioxide. The calcium carbonate dissolves from the rocks and later gets deposited as limescale on the instruments in the geothermal well and at the brink, such as demisters, heat exchangers, and other locations, and this causes a drop in pressure. This results in decreased steam production, reduced efficiency, and an increased probability of failure. Thus, the power plant capacity was reduced to 6 MW before privatization in 2008. To prevent calcium carbonate scaling in production wells, inhibitors are used.

The geothermal fluid of Kızıldere reservoir has a Langelier Saturation Index (LSI) of 2.1 and Ryznar Stability Index (RSI) of 2.3 by a pH value of 9.3, making scaling take place very rapidly.

The source temperature at the first reservoir is between 240–260 °C (464–500 °F). All the geothermal fluid used in the power plant is reinjected into the reservoir for the purpose of maintaining the sustainability of the source.

== Byproducts ==
In addition to electricity generation, the geothermal fluid serves for processing of carbon dioxide gas as a byproduct, and this is used in dry ice production at two nearby plants. The total annual dry ice production in Kızıldere is 80,000 tons. Further applications are heating of 500 decares (500,000 m^{2}; 5,400,000 sq ft) greenhouse space and 2,500 households.

== Honors ==
In June 2011, the International Energy and Environment Fair and Conference (ICCI) awarded Zorlu Energy Inc. the 2010 Energy Prize for its works on renewable energy, particularly in relation to the Kızıldere GEPP and Gökçedağ Wind Farm.

== See also ==
- Geothermal energy in Turkey
