= Seyrantepe Dam =

Seyrantepe Hydroelectric Power Plant
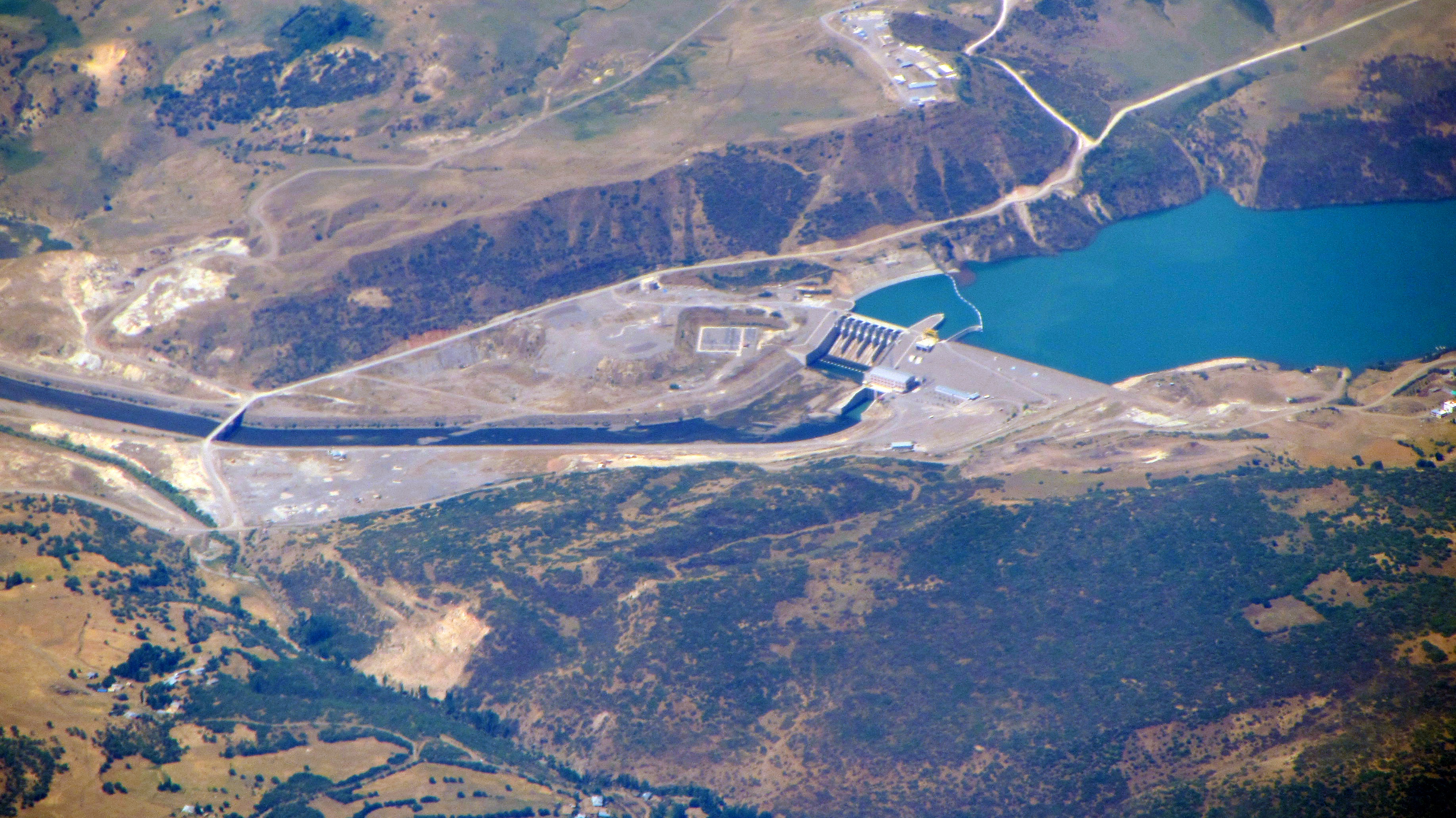
- Aerial photo of the dam and its power station

- Location within Turkey
- Country: Turkey
- Location: Karakoçan on the border of Elazığ and Tunceli Province
- Coordinates: 39°1′15.68″N 39°53′29.87″E
- Purpose: Power, regulation
- Status: Operational
- Construction began: 2003
- Opening date: 2008; 18 years ago

Dam and spillways
- Type of dam: Embankment, sand and gravel-fill
- Impounds: Peri River
- Height (foundation): 48.5 m (159 ft)
- Height (thalweg): 36 m (118 ft)

Power Station
- Operators: Limak Energy and Bilgin Energy
- Commission date: September 2008
- Type: Conventional
- Hydraulic head: 36 m (118 ft) (gross)
- Turbines: 2 x 29.39 MW Francis-type
- Installed capacity: 58.78 MW
- Annual generation: 180 GWh

The Seyrantepe Dam is an earth-fill embankment dam on the Peri River (a tributary of the Euphrates), located 15 km (9 mi) northwest of Karakoçan on the border of Elazığ and Tunceli Provinces, Turkey. Its primary purpose is hydroelectric power generation and is the fifth dam in the Peri River cascade. Construction on the dam began in 2003 and its power station was commissioned in 2008. It contains two 29.39 MW Francis turbine-generators for a total installed capacity of 58.78 MW. It is owned and operated by Limak Energy and Bilgin Energy. The sand and gravel-fill dam is 48.5 m (159 ft) tall.

At the opening of the hydro plant, President (then-Prime Minister) Recep Tayyip Erdoğan used the opportunity to attack environmentalist critics, a campaign he sustained in office: he said

"While making these investments we are also taking the natural life into consideration. We know that most of the [environmentalist] criticisms in the media in this regard are ideological. On the other hand, we are already taking reasonable and sincere criticisms into account and we are examining them. Just like in the case where we consider the balance between democracy and security, we are continuing our balanced approach between development and environment. No one shall have any doubts on this. But we should not forget; while preaching environment, we should not forget to say that humans come first. Because humans come before anything else. The living conditions of our people are very crucial for us."

Speech during the opening ceremony of the Seyrantepe Hydroelectricity Plant, Peri Suyu

== See also ==
- Pembelik Dam – upstream
- Tatar Dam – downstream
