= Adapazarı ENKA School =

Coordinates: 40.8290°N 30.3974°E

- Adapazarı; Turkey

Information
- Type: Private
- Established: 1999
- Founder: Sarik Tara
- Colors: Navy blue and Blue
- Website: www.enka.k12.tr

After the earthquake on August 17, 1999, ENKA foundation joined Turkey's collective effort to provide relief to victims by building schools. In the province of Adapazarı, which suffered the worst damage in the tremor, a public day school for children in temporary accommodation and a private school for those who had lost their parents in the earthquake were planned, built and opened.

Construction began in the first week of September 1999. By October 25, Adapazarı had two schools ready to open. The primary school in the temporary accommodation area of Emirdağ was put under the jurisdiction of the Ministry of National Education. The Enka School in Adapazarı was designated a private institution of learning, as ENKA Schools’ second branch.
