= Erzin gas power plant =

Gas fired power station in Turkey

- Country: Turkey
- Coordinates: 36°55′34″N 36°03′06″E

Power generation
- Nameplate capacity: 904 MW

Erzin gas power plant is a gas-fired power station in Erzin in Hatay Province in south Turkey, capable of generating over 900 MW of power. Opened in 2014, it is operated by a subsidiary of Akenerji.

Climate Trace estimate that in 2023 it emitted 1.31 million tonnes of greenhouse gas.
