= Şarık Tara =

Turkish businessman

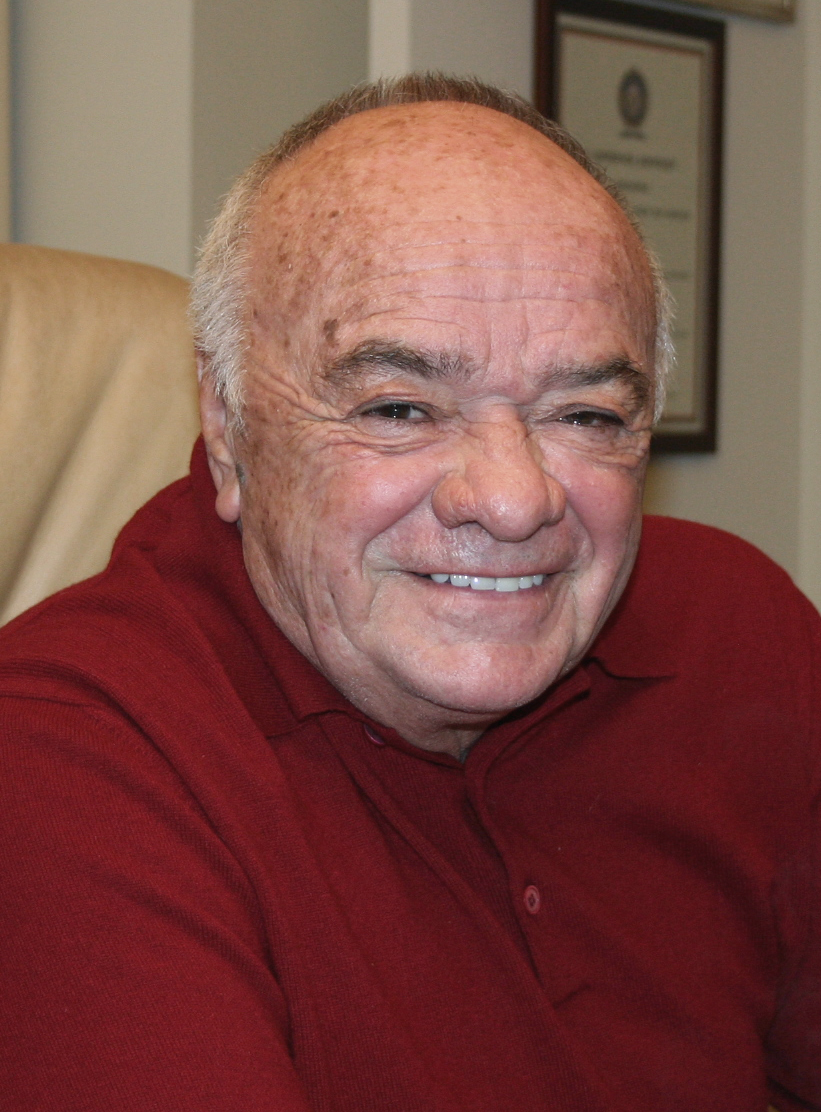
- Born: Šarik Hadžihamzić; 22 April 1930; Skopje, Kingdom of Yugoslavia (present-day North Macedonia)
- Died: 28 June 2018 (aged 88); Istanbul, Turkey
- Education: Şişli Terakki High School
- Alma mater: Istanbul Technical University (BS)
- Occupations: Engineer, Contractor, Industrialist, Philanthropist
- Employer: Enka İnşaat ve Sanayi A.Ş.
- Spouse: Lale Ataman Tara
- Children: 4
- Awards: Council of State Gold Medal, Poland (1985); Order of the Sacred Treasure (1991); Distinguished Service Award, Turkey (1991); Medal of Distinguished Service, Turkey (1997); Athens City Medal (2004); Order of Danica Hrvatska (2005); Order of Friendship (2010); World Economic Forum’s Business Statesman Award (2016)
- Website: https://www.enka.com

Şarık Tara (born Šarik Hadžihamzić; 22 April 1930 – 28 June 2018) was a Turkish billionaire who founded Enka İnşaat ve Sanayi A.Ş., one of Turkey's largest construction company, with Sadi Gülçelik, in 1957. As well as being an international engineer, contractor, industrialist, he was known for his philanthropy.

== Personal life ==
=== Early life and education ===
Tara was born in Skopje, Kingdom of Yugoslavia (now North Macedonia) but emigrated with his family to Turkey in 1942 when he was 12 due to World War II. His father Fevzija Hadžihamzić, an ethnic Bosniak, was from Priboj, a town in the Sandžak region of Serbia, where his family moved from Nikšić. His mother Mahmura Kumbaradži was born in a wealthy Macedonian Turk family from Skopje. Upon arrival to Turkey, his father changed their surname to Tara, in reference to river Tara which flows mainly through Bosnia and Herzegovina and Montenegro. The family's extremely reduced circumstances required Tara to start working when he was young. His knowledge of foreign languages help him secure night work as a translator at a textile factory while he was still attending Şişli Terakki High School.

Tara graduated with a degree in Civil Engineering from Istanbul Technical University in 1954.

=== Marriage and children ===
Tara married Lale Ataman in 1956. In addition to three children, seven grandchildren and eight great grandchildren from this marriage, he has one more son and two more grandchildren.

Tara's elder son M. Sinan Tara is currently ENKA's Executive Chairman of the board of directors. Tara's grandson, A. Mehmet Tara, is currently ENKA's president and Chairman of the executive committee.

== Career ==
=== Business ===
Between 1954 and 1957, Tara worked as a site manager on various construction projects. In 1957, with his brother-in-law, Sadi Gülçelik, he established ENKA contracting company.

Today Enka İnşaat ve Sanayi A.Ş. is a global company in the construction sector with large scale road, tunnel, power plant, and real estate projects. To date, it has completed 396 projects in 45 countries with a total contract value of US$40 billion. Domestically, it has completed 124 projects in Turkey with a total contract value of US$7 billion.

ENKA is also known for constructing U.S. embassy buildings; 36% ($887 million) of ENKA's revenue during the first nine months of 2017 came from the construction of U.S. embassy buildings in various countries.

The conglomerate is one Turkey's largest electricity producers, and is expanding in the energy sector. Over half of ENKA's approximately $3.5 billion in annual revenue comes from energy production. It is Turkey's leading private electricity producer.

From 1984 onwards, Tara played a pioneering role in Turkey entering the Soviet Union. In 1988, Tara signed the contracts for ENKA's renovation of the Petrovski Arcade and construction of the Moscow Hospital. ENKA currently owns offices, a hotel, and 11 shopping malls across Russia. Tara also paved the way for other Turkish companies to become successful in Russia.

=== International relations ===
After Tara's first participation in the World Economic Forum in Davos in 1973, he became a regular. Tara is considered a catalyst in developing Turkey's international relations and presence in the 1970s and 80s. Tara advocated for increased dialogue and commerce between Greece and Turkey. During the World Economic Forum in Davos in 1988, Tara was instrumental in the meeting between prime ministers Turgut Özal and Andreas Papandreou, resulting in the establishment of an official bilateral dialogue between the two countries and Tara becoming the chair of the Turkish-Greek Business Council. Tara remained in this role until 2004. His role in establishing increased cooperation between the respective business communities earned him the first and only Business Statesman Award from the World Economic Forum in 2016.
Tara was active in the foundation of Turkey's Foreign Economic Relations Board (DEİK) in 1986, becoming a member of its executive board. The same year, Tara chaired the Turkish-Japanese Business Council, which was established within DEIK in the same year. He remained in this position until 2000.

Tara lobbied for Turkey's accession to the European Union for many years, as well as for promoting regional peace in the Balkans.

=== Philanthropic works ===
In 1983, Şarık Tara established the 33,600m2 Sadi Gülçelik Sports Complex located in Istinye, Istanbul, named in honor of his deceased brother-in-law and business partner. This facility was designed to support education, the arts, and sports. To guarantee the future of this facility, Tara established the ENKA Foundation the same year.

==== Schools ====
ENKA Schools opened their doors in 1996. In 1999, Adapazarı ENKA School was established, immediately after the Adapazarı earthquake of 1999. The quick construction enabled teaching to begin in the same year. Adapazarı ENKA School provides free scholarships and housing. The Kocaeli ENKA Anatolian Technical and Vocational High School was established in 2008.

==== The Arts ====
ENKA Culture Arts foundation facilities within the Sadi Gülçelik Sports Complex includes the ENKA Eşref Denizhan Open Air Theater, which seats 1,000; the ENKA Auditorium, which seats 600; and the ENKA Dr. Clinton Vickers Art Gallery, all of which host events that are open to the general public.

==== Sports ====
The ENKA foundation's sports complex trains athletes for national and international competition in the following sports: Track and Field, Tennis, Swimming, Water Polo, Volleyball, Basketball, Triathlon, Skiing. Established in 1983, the club is currently composed of 1,087 licensed athletes and 79 professional trainers. ENKA Sports Club had 22 of its athletes compete in the 2016 Rio Olympics and 17 in the 2012 London Olympics.
