= Bahçe District =

District of Osmaniye Province, Turkey

- District
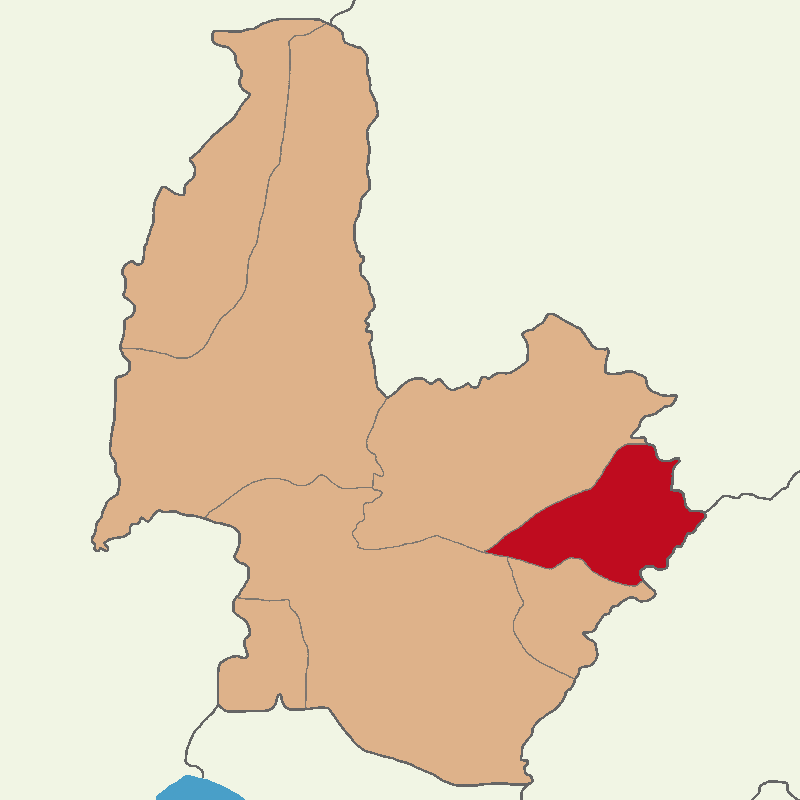
- Map showing Bahçe District in Osmaniye Province

- Location in Turkey
- Coordinates: 37°12′N 36°35′E
- Country: Turkey
- Province: Osmaniye
- Seat: Bahçe

Government
  - Kaymakam: Aziz Kayabaşı
- Area: 208 km^{2} (80 sq mi)
- Population (2022): 22,904
  - Density: 110/km^{2} (290/sq mi)
- Time zone: UTC+3 (TRT)
- Website: www.bahce.gov.tr

Bahçe District is a district of the Osmaniye Province of Turkey. Its seat is the town of Bahçe. Its area is 208 km^{2}, and its population is 22,904 (2022).

== Composition ==
There is one municipality in Bahçe District:

- Bahçe

There are 15 villages in Bahçe District:

- Arıcaklı
- Arıklıkaş
- Aşağı Karadere
- Aşağıarıcaklı
- Bekdemir
- Burgaçlı
- Gökmustafalı
- İnderesi
- Kaman
- Kızlaç
- Nohut
- Örencik
- Savranlı
- Yaylalık
- Yukarıkaradere
