= Soma, Manisa =

Soma
- District and municipality
- Logo

- Map showing Soma District in Manisa Province

- Location in Turkey Soma (Turkey Aegean)
- Coordinates: 39°11′18″N 27°36′32″E
- Country: Turkey
- Province: Manisa

Government
  - Mayor: Sercan Okur (CHP)
- Area: 820 km^{2} (320 sq mi)
- Elevation: 161 m (528 ft)
- Population (2022): 111,789
  - Density: 140/km^{2} (350/sq mi)
- Time zone: UTC+3 (TRT)
- Area code: 0236
- Website: www.soma.bel.tr

Soma is a municipality and district of Manisa Province, Turkey. Its area is 820 km^{2}, and its population is 111,789 (2022). The town lies at an elevation of 161 m (528 ft).

== History ==
From 1867 until 1922, Soma was part of the Aidin Vilayet of the Ottoman Empire.

== Composition ==
There are 71 neighbourhoods in Soma District:

- Adil
- Akçaavlu
- Atatürk
- Avdan
- Bayat
- Beyce
- Boncuklu
- Bozarmut
- Büyük Güney
- Büyük Işıklar
- Çatalçam
- Çavdır
- Cenkyeri
- Çerkez Hamidiye
- Çevircek
- Cuma
- Cumhuriyet
- Darkale
- Deniş
- Dereköy
- Devlethan
- Dualar
- Duğla
- Evciler
- Eynez
- Göktaş
- Hacıyusuf
- Hamidiye
- Hatun
- Heciz
- Hürriyet
- İnönü
- İstasyon
- Kaplan
- Karacahisar
- Karacakaş
- Karaçam
- Karamanlı
- Kayrakaltı
- Kiraz
- Kızılören
- Kobaklar
- Koyundere
- Kozanlı
- Kozluören
- Küçük Güney
- Kum
- Kurtuluş
- Menteşe
- Naldöken
- Namazgah
- Nihat Danışman
- Onüçeylül
- Pirahmet
- Samsacı
- Sarıkaya
- Sevişler
- Söğütçük
- Sultaniye
- Tabanlar
- Tekeli Işıklar
- Turgutalp
- Türkali
- Türkpiyale
- Ularca
- Uruzlar
- Vakıflı
- Yağcılı
- Yayladalı
- Yırca
- Zafer

== Economy ==
Lignite mining and a lignite-fired thermal power plant are the main economic activities in Soma. During World War I the mines were opened up for production. The lignite extracted during that time was described as being of "very bad" quality. That lignite was burned with German coal for trains in the region. A small portion was exported to İzmir. A just transition from coal could be supported by the European Bank for Reconstruction and Development.

The Soma Wind Farm, with 119 wind turbines and an installed total capacity of 140.4 MW, is one of Turkey's largest wind farms.

Olive, walnut and almond cultivation is among the important agricultural activities of Soma.

== 2014 Soma coal mine disaster ==
On 13 May 2014, as a result of an explosion caused by a mine fire at the Soma coal mine, 301 workers were killed.
