= Tatar Dam =

- Location within Turkey
- Country: Turkey
- Location: Tatarköy, Kovancılar district, Elazığ Province
- Coordinates: 38°51′47.06″N 39°49′0.81″E
- Purpose: Power
- Status: Operational
- Construction began: 2008
- Opening date: 2015
- Owner: Limak Energy/Bilgin Energy

Dam and spillways
- Type of dam: Embankment, earth-fill clay-core
- Impounds: Peri River
- Height (foundation): 82 m (269 ft)
- Height (thalweg): 74 m (243 ft)
- Elevation at crest: 920 m (3,020 ft)

Reservoir
- Total capacity: 299,570,000 m^{3} (242,870 acre⋅ft)
- Active capacity: 58,300,000 m^{3} (47,300 acre⋅ft)
- Inactive capacity: 241,270,000 m^{3} (195,600 acre⋅ft)
- Catchment area: 5,379 km^{2} (2,077 mi^{2})

Power Station
- Commission date: 2015
- Type: Conventional
- Hydraulic head: 70 m (230 ft) (gross)
- Turbines: 2 x 64 MW Francis-type
- Installed capacity: 128 MW
- Annual generation: 400 GWh (est.)

The Tatar Dam is an earth-fill dam on the Peri River (a tributary of the Euphrates), near the village of Tatarköy in Kovancılar district of Elazığ Province, Turkey. Its primary purpose is hydroelectric power generation and is the sixth and last dam in the Peri River cascade, before Lake Keban. Construction on the dam began in 2008 and it began impounding its reservoir in early 2013. The power station was commissioned in late 2015. Its two generators were commissioned in February/March 2015. The 82 m (269 ft) tall dam withholds a reservoir of 299,570,000 m^{3} (242,870 acre⋅ft). It is owned and operated by Limak Energy and Bilgin Energy.

== See also ==
- Seyrantepe Dam – upstream
