= Bursa gas power plant =

Gas fired power station in Turkey

- Country: Turkey
- Coordinates: 40°17′46″N 29°04′26″E
- Owner: Electricity Generation Company

Power generation
- Nameplate capacity: 1,432 MW

Bursa gas power plant (Turkish: Bursa Doğalgaz Çevrim Santrali) is a gas-fired power station in Ovaakça in Bursa Province western Turkey. Climate Trace estimates it emitted over a million tonnes of greenhouse gas in 2023.
