= Bandırma power station =

Gas fired power station in Turkey

Bandırma gas power plant
- Country: Turkey
- Coordinates: 40°18′30″N 27°46′07″E

Power generation
- Nameplate capacity: 936 MW

Bandırma power station (Turkish: Bandırma DGKÇ Santrali) is a gas-fired power station in Balıkesir Province in western Turkey, made up of Bandırma I opened in 2010 and Bandırma II in 2016. It is one of the few gigawatt scale power stations in Turkey. It is owned by EnerjiSA. Climate Trace estimates that in 2022 it emitted over 1.6 million tonnes of greenhouse gas, more than any other gas-fired power station in the country.
