= Enka İnşaat ve Sanayi A.Ş. =

Turkish engineering and construction company

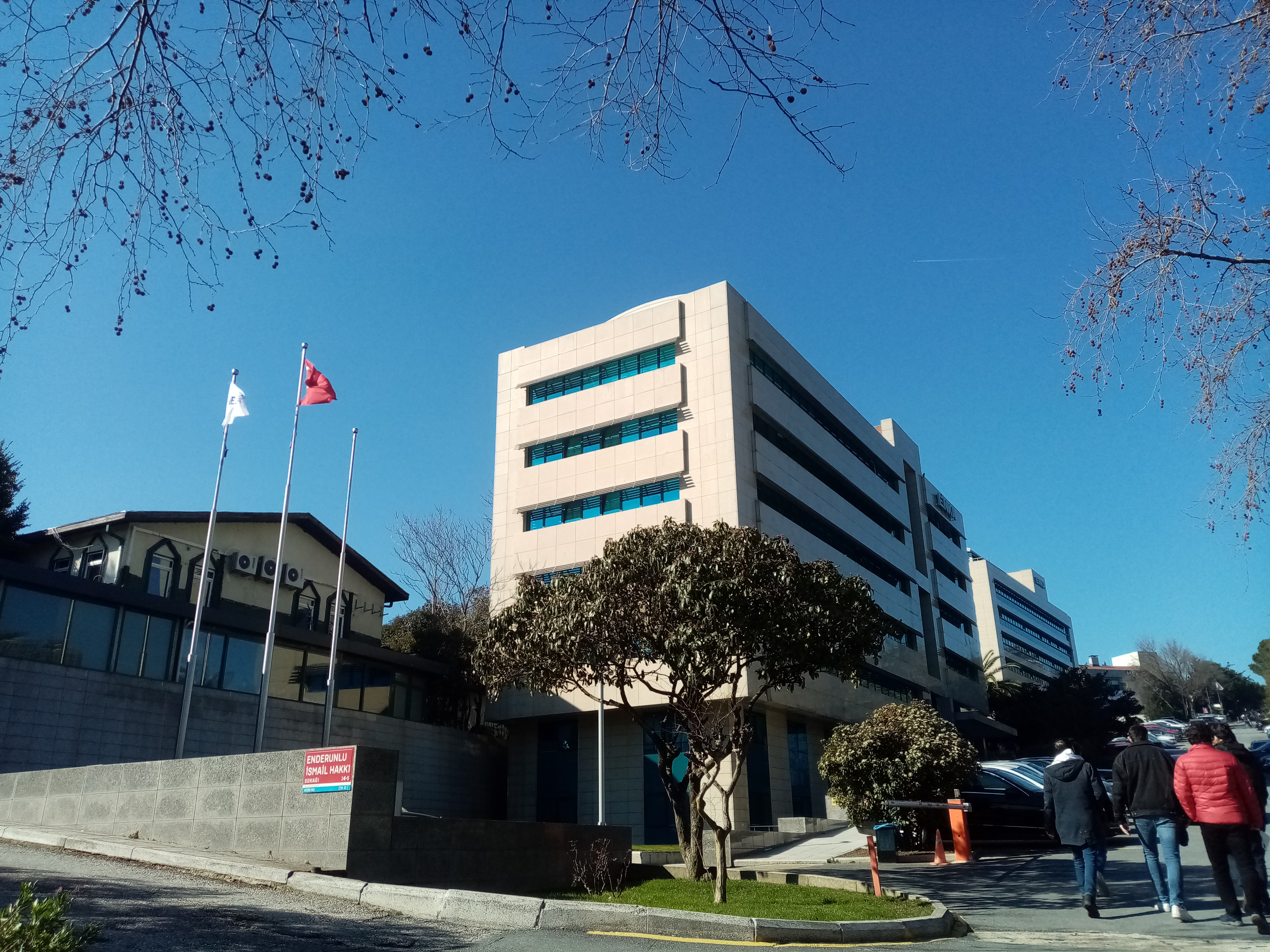
- ENKA's headquarters in Istanbul, Turkey.
- Type: Anonim Şirket
- Industry: Construction; Energy
- Founded: 1957; 69 years ago
- Founder: Şarık Tara; Sadi Gülçelik
- Headquarters: Istanbul, Turkey
- Key people: Mehmet Tara (President & Chairman); Sinan Tara (Advisor to the Board of Directors)
- Revenue: ▼US$3.22 billion (2023)
- Operating income: ▲US$910.64 million (2023)
- Net income: ▲US$743.83 million (2023)
- Total assets: ▲US$9.40 billion (2023)
- Total equity: ▲US$7.42 billion (2023)
- Number of employees: 31,237 (2017)
- Website: www.enka.com

ENKA İnşaat ve Sanayi A.Ş. (stylized as ENKA) is a Turkish engineering and construction company based in Istanbul. ENKA provides construction and engineering services through its subsidiaries in approximately 30 countries across the world. As of 2023, ENKA was listed third among the largest construction companies in Turkey. As of 2025, the number of countries in which ENKA had delivered projects increased to nearly 60, and the company ranked first among the largest Turkish construction companies.

== History ==
ENKA was founded in 1957 in Istanbul, Turkey, by 27-year-old Şarık Tara and his brother-in-law, Sadi Gülçelik. Tara and Gülçelik chose ENKA as the name of the company from the first syllable of two words, "enişte" and "kayınbirader" meaning "brother-in-law". Gülçelik died in 1980 in a Saudi Arabian airplane crash and Tara became the sole proprietor. Around the same time, ENKA began acquiring larger scale projects, increasing their rank as one of the top 250 international contractors.

In 1972, the company established ENKA Pazarlama, a sales-focused subsidiary for several earthmoving equipment and construction machinery brands. The following year, ENKA founded Cimtas, one of the company's fully owned subsidiaries. The company expanded internationally during the 1970s and 1980s.

Sarik Tara passed the company to his son, Sinan Tara, in 1984. Sarik was 56 years old, and Sinan wanted to preserve ENKA's tradition of having young leaders. Sarık Tara's grandson, Mehmet Tara, became CEO at age 29.

The ENKA Moscow office opened in 1987. After the breakup of the Soviet Union, ENKA delivered goods and services, ultimately building a strong business relationship with Russia. The company collaborated with the Moscow city government in 1995 to build the MosENKA development. In the mid-1990s, ENKA built a second investment company, Moskva Krasnye Holmy, building offices, shopping centers, and recreation facilities across Russia.

In 1997, ENKA and the Turkish company Migros founded RamENKA in a joint-venture, building shopping centers across Russia. ENKA acquired all of RamENKA stock when Migros sold their half of the company in 2007. ENKA had built 10 shopping malls in Russia by 2000. The company has been regarded as one of the main providers of construction services in the Russian market since the 1990s.

== Operations ==
ENKA is a global engineering and construction company headquartered in Istanbul, Turkey. In addition to engineering and construction, its operations include energy, real estate, trading, and manufacturing. The company has been involved in the construction of power plants, airports, bridges, pipelines, motorways, business towers and shopping centers. Mehmet Tara is president and chairman of the board, as of 2022. As of May 2017, ENKA employed 31,237 people. ENKA is publicly traded in Borsa Istanbul (BIST).

ENKA has employed approximately 200,000 people in its projects abroad. The company has carried out around 500 projects in more than 30 countries including Albania, Algeria, Cameroon, Kazakhstan, Libya, the Netherlands, Nepal, Oman, Romania, Russia, Saudi Arabia, Sierra Leone, Tajikistan, and Ukraine.

As of 2025, ENKA had entered additional markets, including Bulgaria, Germany, Kosovo, Mozambique, North Macedonia, Serbia, Puerto Rico, and the Bahamas, bringing the total number of countries in which it had delivered projects to nearly 60.

ENKA was listed at #270 on Forbes' "Global 2000: World's Best Employers" in 2017.

ENKA launched a new business line focused on data center construction and operations through its newly established company, ENKA Data Solutions, in 2025.

In late 2025, ENKA's subsidiary, ENKA UK Properties Ltd., acquired the Park House office building in the United Kingdom, which has an approximate floor area of 18,000 m^{2}, as part of ENKA's global real estate portfolio.

== Projects ==
ENKA's earliest projects include the İstinye Highway Bridge and the Babaeski-Kuleli road construction in Istanbul. In the early 1970s, ENKA, in a partnership with German company Wayss and Freytag, built the Ortaköy viaducts and the Bosphorus Bridge. ENKA continued to expand internationally in the 1980s with the award of the 1981 housing development contract in Al Medinah, Saudi Arabia, in a joint venture with the company Kutlutas.

Throughout the early 1980s, ENKA worked on different kinds of projects in the Middle East, such as water treatment facilities and cement plants. During this time, ENKA built Turkey's first natural gas power plant, the Trakya Natural Gas Combined Cycle Plant. In 1984, ENKA, in collaboration with Toyo, completed the construction of the Iraq-Turkey Crude Oil Pipeline Expansion project.

ENKA undertook various construction projects in the late 1980s and the beginning of the 1990s, including the Bekhme Dam in Iraq, the Petrovsky Passage in Russia, and the Ankara-Gerede Motorway, in a partnership with Bechtel. Around this time, ENKA was also responsible for the construction of the Russian Federation Government House, known as the "White House".

ENKA entered another joint venture with Bechtel in 1993 with the Tengiz Oil Field project in western Kazakhstan. In 1997, ENKA and Bechtel were awarded the rights to build and operate the Gebze, Adapazarı, and Izmir gas power plants. Both companies began work on the Bregana-Zagreb-Dubrovnik Motorway in Croatia in 1998. The Gebze and Adapazarı Plants were completed in 2002 and the İzmir Plant, in 2003. All three power plants are still in use, as of 2018. ENKA signed a contract in 2001 for work constructing an artificial island for the development of the Kashagan Oil Field, which is the largest oil field discovered in Kazakhstan in the last 30 years.

ENKA began construction of the Sakhalin II Onshore Processing Facility Project in Sakhalin Island, Russia, in a collaborative project with Tekhnostroieksport and Bechtel, in 2003. In November of the same year, ENKA worked with Tekhnostroieksport on the construction of the Sakhalin I De-Kastri Oil Export Terminal. In 2004, ENKA and Bechtel began work on the Transylvanian Motorway in Romania, the biggest infrastructure project in Europe. The project concluded in 2013. The companies also worked together in 2007 to build Albania's first two-bore tunnel in a highway connecting Kosovo and Albania.

ENKA finished construction on the Donbas Arena, in Donetsk, Ukraine, in 2009. In April 2010, the ENKA-Bechtel partnership was awarded a contract for the construction of the 78 kilometre Route 7 four-lane motorway from Morine to the north of Pristina in Kosovo, and finished a year ahead of schedule in November 2013. In approximately 2011, ENKA signed on a joint venture, BEB Consortium, with Bechtel and Jeff Brighton of Bahwan, on the redesign of the Muscat International Airport in Oman. This is one of the largest projects in the history of Oman.

ENKA was awarded an engineering, procurement and construction (EPC) contract to convert the Erbil Independent Power Project from simple-cycle to combined-cycle technology and began work in summer 2012. Around the same time, ENKA began construction of the third generator unit at the Berezovskaya power plant in Sharypovsky, Russia. The structural design of this project is comparable to the first two generators at the Berezovskaya power plant, but features an upgrade to increase efficiency and reduce nitrogen oxide emissions. ENKA was the lead contractor for the engineering, procurement and construction of the Sulaymaniyah 1,500 MW Combined Cycle Power Plant Project in Iraq that began in 2013.

ENKA and Bechtel also worked together to build a 60-kilometer motorway linking Pristina to Skopje, starting in June 2014. The ENKA-Bechtel joint venture also signed a contract for the South Caucasus Pipeline Expansion Project in Georgia, in October of the same year. ENKA developed Kuntsevo Plaza during 2015–2016. Around the same time, the company started work on the Kashirskaya Shopping Center investment project.

ENKA signed on to build the Bismayah power plant in Baghdad, Iraq, supplying approximately 5 million homes with power. In November 2017, four ENKA employees were kidnapped in Benghazi while traveling from the airport to the power plant in Ubari, Libya. Employees were met with security issues and work was paused from late January 2018 to the end of February 2018.

ENKA collaborated with Siemens to build the 495 MW power plant for Nizhnekamskneftekhim, a subsidiary of Taif Group, in Tatarstan, Russia, in late 2017. Commercial operation is set to begin May 2021.

In mid-2018, ENKA began construction of the quay wall for the Basra Multi-purpose Terminal, the largest multipurpose port facility in Iraq.

ENKA in a partnership with Bechtel, signed a contract for the design and construction of Morava Corridor Motorway in Serbia in December 2019. The project with a total length of 112 kilometers will be completed by the end of the 2023.

In late 2019, ENKA began work on the High-Technological Multifunctional Medical Complex (HMMC) Project in St. Petersburg, Russia. Construction and design works include a main hospital building, oncology center, diesel generator building, and oxygen station structures. The complex will feature cancer treatment using the Proton therapy to significantly reduce the amount of radiation exposure during treatment.

In September 2021, ENKA signed a contract for the execution of all piping systems of the power island at Hinkley Point C Nuclear Power Station being built in Somerset, United Kingdom.

ENKA collaborated with Uniper to perform the engineering, procurement, construction and commissioning works of the Dradenau Combined Heat and Power Plant project in Hamburg, Germany in late 2021. The power plant is expected to be operational in December 2024.

In December 2021, ENKA was chosen to be general contractor for the construction of the new Yandex HQ building by the 2nd quarter of 2024. The contract is estimated by 500 million euros ex VAT.

== Foundation ==
The ENKA Foundation supports the arts, culture, sports, and education. The ENKA Culture and Arts Foundation facilities established in 1988 include the ENKA Eşref Denizhan Open Air Theater and the ENKA Auditorium, both of which host events that are open to the public.

The Sadi Gülçelik Sports Complex was established in 1988 in memory of Sadi Gülçelik.

In 1996, ENKA Foundation opened schools in Istanbul. In 1999, the Adapazarı ENKA School was established immediately after the Adapazarı earthquake of 1999. The Gebze Technical and Industrial Vocational High School was established in 2008. All students that attend the school have full scholarships paid for by the ENKA Foundation.
