= Baymina Ankara power station =

Gas fired power station in Turkey

Baymina Ankara gas power station
- Country: Turkey
- Coordinates: 39°46′37″N 32°24′08″E
- Status: Operational
- Commission date: 5 February 2004
- Owner: Engie
- Combined cycle?: Yes

Power generation
- Nameplate capacity: 770 MW

External links
- Website: www.baymina.com

Baymina Ankara power station (Turkish: Baymina Ankara Doğalgaz Santrali) is a gas-fired power station in Ankara Province central Turkey.
