= Aliağa Wind Farm =

Wind farm in Aliağa, Turkey

- Official name: Aliağa Rüzgâr Enerji Santrali
- Country: Turkey
- Location: Aliağa, İzmir Province
- Coordinates: 38.815°N 27.007778°E
- Status: Operational

Wind farm
- Type: onshore
- Hub height: 80 m (260 ft)
- Rotor diameter: 90 m (300 ft), 70 m (230 ft)

Power generation
- Make and model: Nordex (53): Nordex N90/2500; Enercon (30): Enercon E70/2000
- Nameplate capacity: 193 MW
- Annual net output: 481 GWh

Aliağa Wind Farm is an onshore wind power plant in Aliağa district of İzmir Province in western Turkey.

The wind farm consists of four fields operated by different companies. A total of 83 wind turbines have an installed output power of 193 MW generating about 480 GWh a year.

== Technical details ==
- Yurtdağ Wind Farm consists of 17 Nordex N90/2500 turbines each with 90 m (300 ft) diameter rotors generating 2.5 MW of power. Total installed power is 42.5 MW. It is operated by Innores.
- Wind Farm 2 consists of 15 Enercon E70/2000 turbines each with 70 m (230 ft) diameter rotors generating 2 MW power. Total installed power is 30.0 MW. Operated by Doruk company.
- Wind Farm Atçılar consists of 36 turbines of type Nordex. Total installed power is 90.0 MW. In service since April 2010, the field is operated by Yapısan company.
- Wind Farm 4 consists of 15 turbines of type Enercon. Total installed power is 30.0 MW. Operated by Doğal company.
