= Dağpazarı =

- Neighbourhood
- Location in Turkey
- Coordinates: 36°50′N 33°28′E
- Country: Turkey
- Province: Mersin
- District: Mut
- Elevation: 1,300 m (4,300 ft)
- Population (2022): 245
- Time zone: UTC+3 (TRT)
- Postal code: 33600
- Area code: 0324

Dağpazarı is a neighbourhood in the municipality and district of Mut, Mersin Province, Turkey. Its population is 245 (2022). Situated in the Taurus Mountains, northeast of Mut, the road distance to Mut is about 35 kilometres (22 mi) and to Mersin is 195 kilometres (121 mi). Dağpazarı is also a yayla (resort) of Mut residents and in summers the population may increase.

== History ==
Dağpazarı is an old village. During Byzantine era its name was Coropissus. It was on the road connecting Mut to Central Anatolia. There are ruins of a church as well as rock tombs around the village. After Seljukids and Crusaders, Dağpazarı was captured by the Karamanids in the 13th century and by the Ottoman Empire in the 15th century. After the Russo-Turkish War (1877–1878), during which most of the Ottoman territories in Europe were lost, Turks from Hacıoğlu Pazarcık (modern Dobrich in Bulgaria) migrated to Anatolia to find new homes and 18 families of these people were settled in Dağpazarı to start a new phase in village history.

== Economy ==
After irrigation problems were solved in 1950s, the village became an important fruit producer. Main products are apple and grapes.

In May 2012, a wind farm consisting of 13 wind turbines with a total installed capacity of 39 MW was constructed.
