= Özlüce Dam =

- Location within Turkey
- Official name: Özlüce Baraji
- Country: Turkey
- Location: Yayladere
- Coordinates: 39°07′47″N 40°05′16″E
- Status: Operational
- Construction began: 1992
- Opening date: 2000
- Owner: Turkish State Hydraulic Works

Dam and spillways
- Impounds: Peri River
- Height: 144 m (472 ft)
- Dam volume: 14,600,000 m^{3} (19,096,079 cu yd)

Reservoir
- Total capacity: 1,075,000,000 m^{3} (871,517 acre⋅ft)
- Surface area: 26 km^{2} (10 mi^{2})

Power Station
- Turbines: 2 x 100 MW Francis-type
- Installed capacity: 200 MW
- Annual generation: 413 GWh

Özlüce Dam is a rock-fill embankment dam on the Peri River (a tributary of the Euphrates), located 10 km (6 mi) south of Yayladere in Bingöl Province, Turkey. Its primary purpose is hydroelectric power generation and is the third dam in the Peri River cascade. Constructed between 1992 and 2000, the development was backed by the Turkish State Hydraulic Works.

== See also ==
- Pembelik Dam – downstream
- Yedisu Dam – upstream
- List of dams and reservoirs in Turkey
