= Peri River =

Location
- Country: Turkey

Physical characteristics
- Mouth
  - location: Lake Keban
- Basin size: 5,379 km^{2} (2,077 mi^{2})
- Discharge
  - average: 2,704,220,000 m^{3} (9.5499×10^{10} cu ft) (annual)

Basin features
- River system: Euphrates

The Peri River (Turkish: Peri Çayı or Peri Suyu) is a principle left-bank tributary of the Euphrates River in eastern Turkey. It discharges into the reservoir of the Keban Dam. The river begins in Erzurum Province and flows through Bingöl Province before creating the border between the provinces of Elazığ and Tunceli. From upstream to downstream, it is interrupted by the Kığı, Yedisu, Özlüce, Pembelik, Seyrantepe and Tatar Dams. The primary purpose of the dams is hydroelectric power generation and to reduce silt in Lake Keban.
