= Bahçe Wind Farm =

Wind farm in Turkey

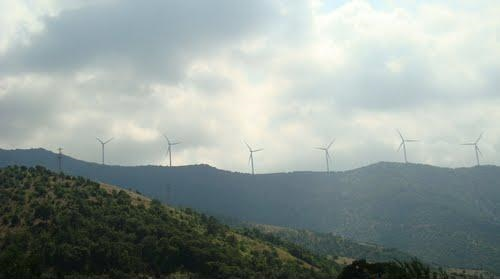
- Official name: Bahçe Rüzgâr Enerji Santrali
- Country: Turkey
- Location: Bahçe, Osmaniye Province
- Coordinates: 37.17988°N 36.60971°E
- Status: Operational
- Construction began: July 2008
- Commission date: 2009; 16 years ago
- Construction cost: €200 million

Wind farm
- Type: onshore
- Hub height: 85 m (279 ft)
- Rotor diameter: 100 m (330 ft)

Power generation
- Units operational: 54
- Make and model: GE Wind Energy: 54x GE 2.5 XL
- Nameplate capacity: 135 MW
- Annual net output: 500 GWh

Bahçe Wind Farm or Gökçedağ Wind Farm is an onshore wind power plant in the Bahçe district of Osmaniye Province, in the eastern Mediterranean Region of Turkey. Consisting of 54 wind turbines with an installed output power of 135 MW in total, the wind farm was the country's largest one when it was commissioned in 2009.

The licence for the wind farm was obtained in 2003 and will expire in 2033. Construction works at the site began in 2008. It was constructed on Gökçedağ, a mountain between Bahçe and Hasanbeyli, south of the Osmaniye-Gaziantep highway D.400. It is operated by Rotor Co., a subsidiary of Zorlu Holding. The wind farm cost €200 million.

== Technical details ==
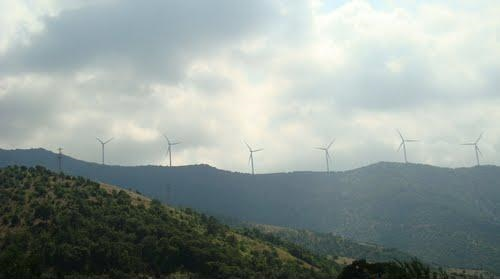
Gokcedag Wind Turbines near Osmaniye.

Each of the 54 wind turbines of type GE 2.5 XL, manufactured by GE Wind Energy, has an installed power capacity of 2.5 MW generated by 100 m (330 ft) rotor diameter at 85 m (279 ft) hub height. The electricity is fed into the grid by a 7 km (4.3 mi) long overhead transmission line.
