= Kiğı Dam =

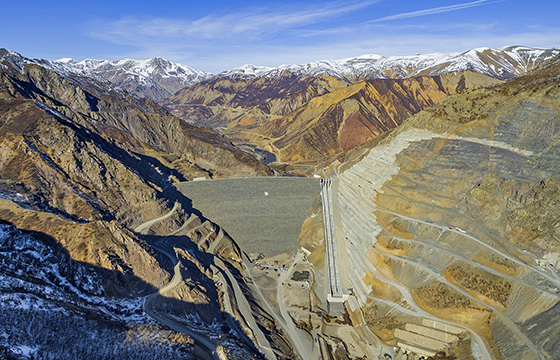

- Location within Turkey
- Official name: Kiğı Barajı
- Country: Turkey
- Location: Bingöl
- Coordinates: 39°22′06″N 40°21′07″E
- Status: Dam complete; reservoir impounding
- Construction began: 1998
- Opening date: 2006
- Owner: Turkish State Hydraulic Works

Dam and spillways
- Type of dam: Embankment, rock-fill
- Impounds: Peri River
- Height (foundation): 170 m (558 ft)
- Height (thalweg): 150 m (492 ft)
- Width (crest): 585 m (1,919 ft)
- Dam volume: 23,000,000 m^{3} (30,082,864 cu yd)
- Spillway capacity: 4,500 m^{3}/s (158,916 cu ft/s)

Reservoir
- Total capacity: 1,200,000,000 m^{3} (972,856 acre⋅ft)
- Surface area: 8.35 km^{2} (3 mi^{2})

Kığı HES
- Coordinates: 39°18′3.76″N 40°22′17.09″E
- Commission date: 2016 (est.)
- Turbines: 3 x 60 MW Francis-type
- Installed capacity: 180 MW

Kiğı Dam is a rock-fill embankment dam on the Peri River (a tributary of the Euphrates) in Bingöl Province, Turkey. Its primary purpose is hydroelectric power generation and is the first dam in the Peri River cascade, serving as the headwaters. Construction began in 1998 and is backed by the Turkish State Hydraulic Works. When commissioned, it will support a 180 MW power station. Water from the reservoir will be diverted to an underground power station downstream via an 8.5 km (5.3 mi) long tunnel. In August 2015, suspected Kurdistan Workers' Party militants set fire to three cement trucks associated with the dam construction site. In January 2016, the dam was completed and the reservoir began to impound water.

== See also ==
- Yedisu Dam - located downstream
- List of dams and reservoirs in Turkey
