= Ambarlı A power plant =

Gas fired power station in Turkey

Ambarlı power station
- Country: Turkey
- Coordinates: 40°58′56″N 28°41′26″E
- Owner: Electricity Generation Company

Thermal power station
- Primary fuel: Natural gas

Power generation
- Nameplate capacity: 1,351 MW

External links
- Website: www.euas.gov.tr/santraller/istanbul-dogalgaz-kombine-cevrim-a-santrali

Ambarlı A power plant or Istanbul Natural Gas Combined Cycle A power plant (Turkish: İstanbul Doğalgaz Kombi̇ne Çevri̇m A Santralı) is a gas-fired power station in İstanbul Province north-western Turkey.
