= Soma Wind Farm =

- Official name: Soma Rüzgâr Enerji Santrali
- Country: Turkey
- Location: Soma, Manisa Province
- Coordinates: 39°10′47.9″N 27°36′0″E
- Status: Operational
- Construction began: 2009
- Commission date: 2012; 13 years ago
- Construction cost: €170 million
- Owner: Polat Enerji A.Ş.
- Operator: EDF Energies Nouvelles

Wind farm
- Type: onshore
- Hub height: 89x 55 m (180 ft), 30x 64 m (210 ft)
- Rotor diameter: 89x 44 m (144 ft), 30x 71 m (233 ft)

Power generation
- Units operational: 119
- Make and model: Enercon: 89x E-44, 30x E-70
- Nameplate capacity: 140.4 MW
- Annual net output: 405 GWh

Soma Wind Farm is an onshore wind power plant in Soma in Manisa Province in the northwestern Aegean Region of Turkey. Built in two phases and consisting of 119 wind turbines with an installed output power of 140 MW in total, it is one of Turkey's largest wind farms.

The wind farm, distributed over a large mountainous terrain, extends over a land area of 123 km^{2} (47 sq mi). The wind farm was constructed and is operated by Polat Energy, a joint venture company of Polat Holding, which is owned by former Galatasaray S.K. president Adnan Polat, and the French company EDF Energies Nouvelles.

== Technical details ==
Soma Wind Farm was built in two phases, called Soma-1 and Soma-2. Average total annual energy generated is 405 GWh. The cost of the project totalled to €170 million. It was completed and commissioned in January 2012.

The first phase, consisting of 88 wind turbines with a total installed capacity of 79.2 MW manufactured by Enercon, cost €100 million, and was commissioned in December 2010. Each of the E-44 type turbines with 44 m (144 ft) rotor diameter at 55 m (180 ft) hub height generates 900 KW power. 50 of the wind turbines are atop of steel towers while the rest were installed on precast concrete towers.

In the second phase, 31 wind turbines were erected, one of E-44 type and 30 of E-70 type, which having a rotor diameter of 71 m (233 ft) at 65 m (213 ft) hub height generate each 2.3 MW. The second phase extended the wind farm's power capacity about 60.9 MW.

The area has extreme winter conditions that cause icing of the rotor blades. To prevent this, some turbines are equipped with de-icing system.

Soma Wind Farm is Turkey's only wind power plant feeding electricity into grid at 380 kV.
