= Çanta Wind Farm =

Wind farm in northwestern Turkey

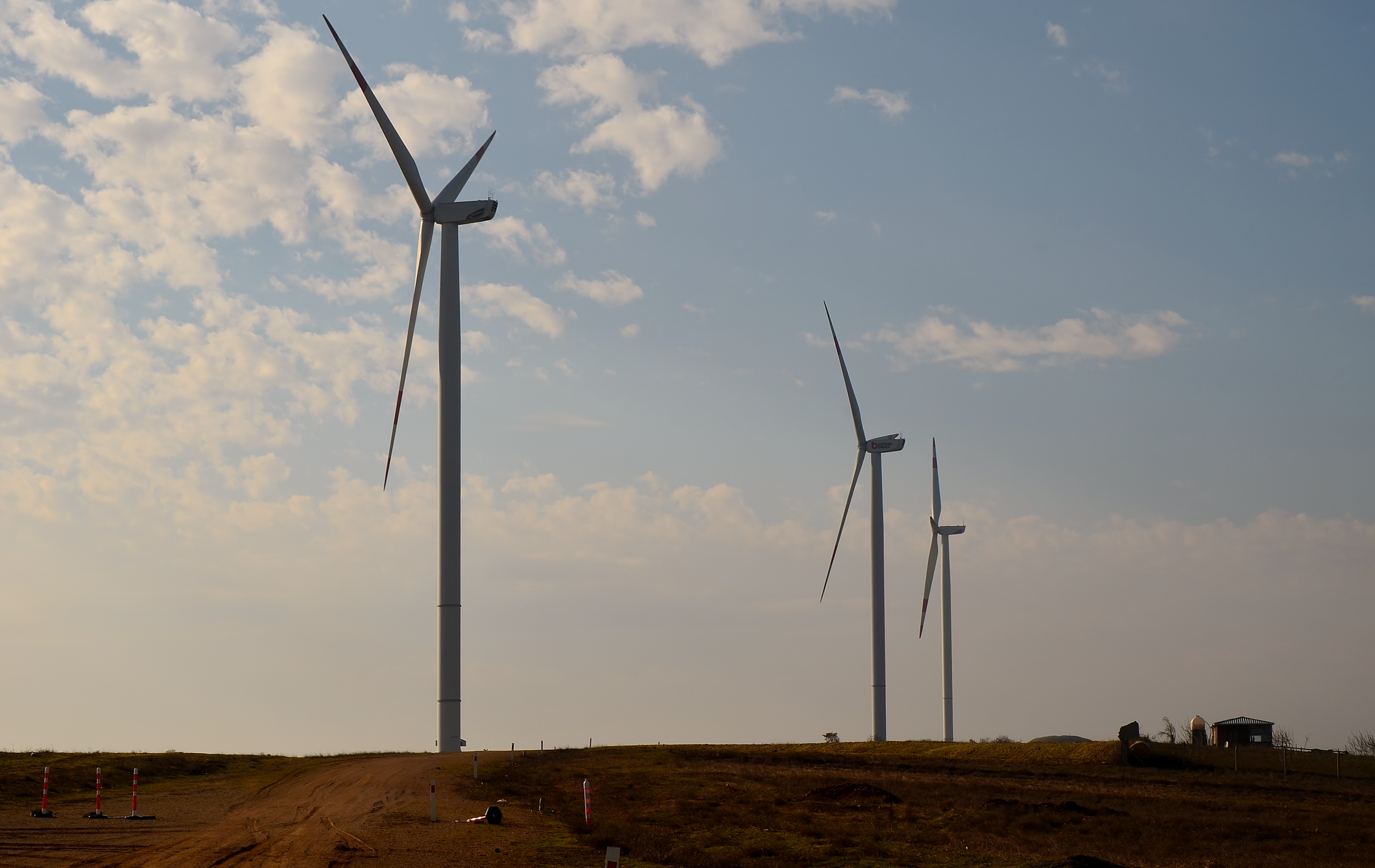
- The Çanta Wind Farm
- Official name: Çanta Rüzgar Enerji Santrali
- Country: Turkey
- Location: Çanta, Silivri, Istanbul Province
- Coordinates: 41°06′50″N 28°03′30″E
- Status: Operational
- Construction began: 2012
- Commission date: May 31, 2014; 11 years ago
- Owner: Boydak Enerji
- Operator: Boydak Enerji

Wind farm
- Type: onshore

Power generation
- Units operational: 19
- Make and model: Nordex N100/2500
- Nameplate capacity: 19 X 2.5 MW
- Annual net output: 151 GWh

External links
- Commons: Related media on Commons

Çanta Wind Farm is a 2014 wind power plant consisting of 19 wind turbines with a total installed capacity of 47.5 MW. The wind farm is in Çanta in the Silivri district of Istanbul Province, northwestern Turkey.

The wind farm was initially projected by Bora Wind Energy Company in 2011. After Boydak Energy Company took over Bora Co., construction began in 2012. The farm went into production in May 2014 with six turbines, each with a capacity to generate 2.5 MW. By the end of June 2014, eight more turbines were in service, increasing the total installed capacity to 35 MW.

== Location ==
The wind farm is located on a 240 m (790 ft)-high hill northwest of Çanta town, just east of the provincial border between Tekirdağ and Istanbul. It is at a distance of 27 km (17 mi) to Çorlu, 17 km (11 mi) to Silivri and 83 km (52 mi) to Istanbul.

== Technical details ==
Maximum power output of each of the 19 turbines supplied by Nordex in Germany is 2.5 MW, and the total annual energy production is about 151 GWh. The turbines of type N100/2500 have 100 m (330 ft) rotor diameter.

Average annual wind speed at the site is given with 7.5–8.5 m/s (25–28 ft/s).

== See also ==
- List of wind farms in Turkey
