= İzmir gas power plant =

Gas fired power station in Turkey

İzmir natural gas fired CCPP
- Country: Turkey
- Coordinates: 38°44′47″N 26°57′23″E
- Owner: Enka İnşaat ve Sanayi A.Ş.
- Operator: Enka İnşaat ve Sanayi A.Ş.

Power generation
- Nameplate capacity: 1,520 MW

External links
- Website: www.enka.com/portfolio-item/turkey-boo-project-izmir-natural-gas-combined-cycle-power-plant/

İzmir gas power plant (Turkish: İzmir Doğalgaz Kombine Çevrim Santrali) is a gas-fired power station in İzmir Province in western Turkey. Climate Trace estimates that in 2023 it emitted 2.5 million tonnes of greenhouse gas.
