= Kentsa gas power plant =

Gas fired power station in Turkey

Kentsa power plant
- Country: Turkey

Power generation
- Nameplate capacity: 40 MW

Kentsa gas power plant is a gas-fired power station in İzmit in Kocaeli Province north-western Turkey, which belongs to EnerjiSA and is 40 MW and was built in 1997. The company plans to add some solar power.
