= Dağpazarı Wind Farm =

Wind power plant in Turkey

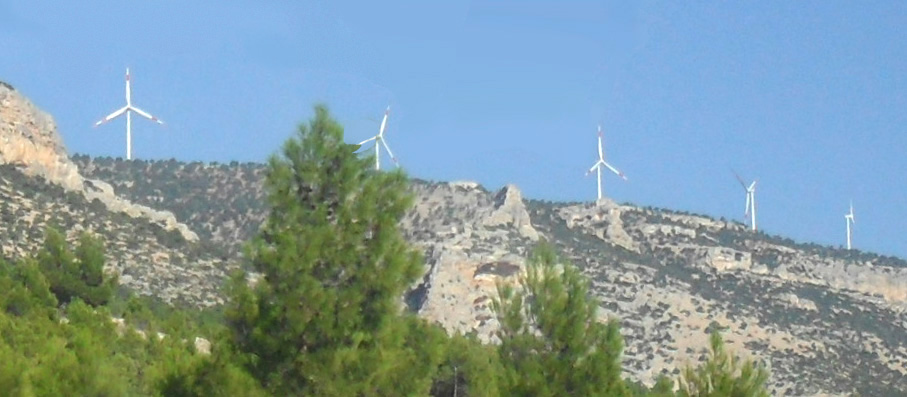
- Windfarm from west
- Official name: Dağpazarı Rüzgâr Enerji Santrali
- Country: Turkey
- Location: Dağpazarı, Mut, Mersin Province
- Coordinates: 36°50′N 33°28′E
- Status: Operational
- Construction began: April 2012
- Commission date: May 20, 2012; 13 years ago
- Operator: Enerjisa

Wind farm
- Type: onshore

Power generation
- Units operational: 13
- Make and model: Siemens Wind Power
- Nameplate capacity: 13 X 3 MW
- Annual net output: 129 GWh

Dağpazarı Wind Farm is a wind power plant consisting of 13 wind turbines in Dağpazarı in the Taurus Mountains in the Mut district of Mersin Province, southern Turkey. It came online in 2012.

== Geography ==
The wind farm is located on the Taurus Mountains, northeast of Mut, at a distance of 35 km (22 mi) to Mut and 195 km (121 mi) to Mersin.

== Technical details ==
Maximum power output of each of the 13 turbines supplied by Siemens Wind Power is 3 MW and the total annual energy production is about 129 GWh.

== See also ==
- Mut Wind Farm
