= Mut Wind Farm =

- Official name: Mut Rüzgâr Enerji Santrali
- Country: Turkey
- Location: Mt. Magras, Mut, Mersin Province
- Coordinates: 36°44′N 33°15′E
- Status: Operational
- Commission date: 2010; 16 years ago
- Construction cost: US$50 million

Wind farm
- Type: onshore
- Hub height: 80 m (262 ft)
- Rotor diameter: 90 m (295 ft)
- Site elevation: 1,370 m (4,495 ft)

Power generation
- Units operational: 11
- Nameplate capacity: 11 x 3 MW
- Annual net output: 100 million MWh

Mut Wind Farm is a wind power plant consisting of eleven wind turbines situated on Mt. Magras in Özlü in the Mut district of Mersin Province in southern Turkey. The wind farm went into service in 2010.

== Geography ==
The farm is constructed on Mount Magras, a part of Toros Mountains range to the north of Mut district in Mersin Province. Mount Magras is actually the top of a 1,370 m (4,490 ft) canyon to the south of Göksu River valley and the town of Göksu. The wind turbines are erected just to the northeast of the village Özlü and the farm is sometimes called the Özlü Wind Farm.

== Technical details ==
There are eleven turbines each 80 m (260 ft) high with rotor diameter of 90 m (300 ft). Maximum power output of each turbine is 3 MW and the total annual energy production is about 100 MWh. The energy is fed to Gezende Dam situated about 25 km (16 mi) southwest of Mut wind farm.

== Project ==
The US$50 million project was carried out by Ağaoğlu Energy Group, and it is further planned to increase the number of turbines to 40.

== See also ==
- Dağpazarı Wind Farm
