= Bahçe, Osmaniye =

Bahçe
- Municipality
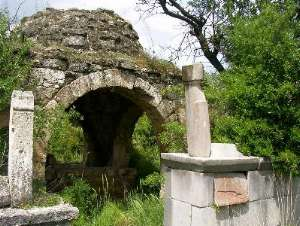
- Ağcabey Dome

- Location within Turkey
- Coordinates: 37°12′N 36°35′E
- Country: Turkey
- Province: Osmaniye
- District: Bahçe

Government
  - Mayor: İbrahim Baz (AKP)
- Elevation: 67 m (220 ft)
- Population (2022): 16,110
- Time zone: UTC+3 (TRT)
- Postal code: 80500
- Area code: 0328
- Website: www.bahce.bel.tr

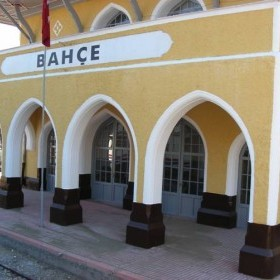
Bahçe railway station

Bahçe is a town in Osmaniye Province in the Mediterranean region of Turkey. It is the seat of Bahçe District. Its population is 16,110 (2022). It is located in the Nur Mountains area.

The Bahçe Wind Farm, situated on the Gökçedağ, was the country's largest one with its installed power of 135 MW as it was commissioned in 2009.

The Ayran railroad station (Ayran İstasyonu) is located east of the town, near the entrance to the tunnel (Bahçe-tünel) leading to Fevzipaşa. This tunnel was originally built as part of the Baghdad Railway in the early 20th century.

== Notable natives ==
- Devlet Bahçeli, politician and chairman of the Nationalist Movement Party (MHP)
