= Şamlı Wind Farm =

Wind farm in Turkey

- Official name: Şamlı Rüzgâr Enerji Santralı
- Country: Turkey
- Location: Şamlı, Balıkesir
- Coordinates: 39.82172°N 27.82425°E
- Status: Operational

Wind farm
- Type: onshore
- Hub height: 80 m (260 ft)
- Rotor diameter: 90 m (300 ft)

Power generation
- Make and model: Vestas: V90/3000
- Nameplate capacity: 174 MW
- Annual net output: 375 GWh

Şamlı Wind Farm is an onshore wind power plant in Şamlı in Balıkesir Province in western Turkey.

The wind farm consists of three fields operated by different companies. A total of 91 wind turbines have an installed output power of 150 MW and generate about 375 GWh a year.

== Technical details ==
- Field 1 consists of 38 turbines of type Vestas V90/3000 each with 90 m (300 ft) rotor diameter at a hub height of 80 m (260 ft) generating 3.0 MW power. Total installed power increased from 90 MW to 114 MW with the expansion completed in November 2011. Operated by Borasco.
- Field 2 has a total installed power is 30.0 MW. Operated by Yapısan company.
- Field 3 consists of 20 turbines of type Vestas. Total installed power is 30.0 MW. The field is operated by Bares company.
