= Çanta, Silivri =

Çanta
- Neighbourhood
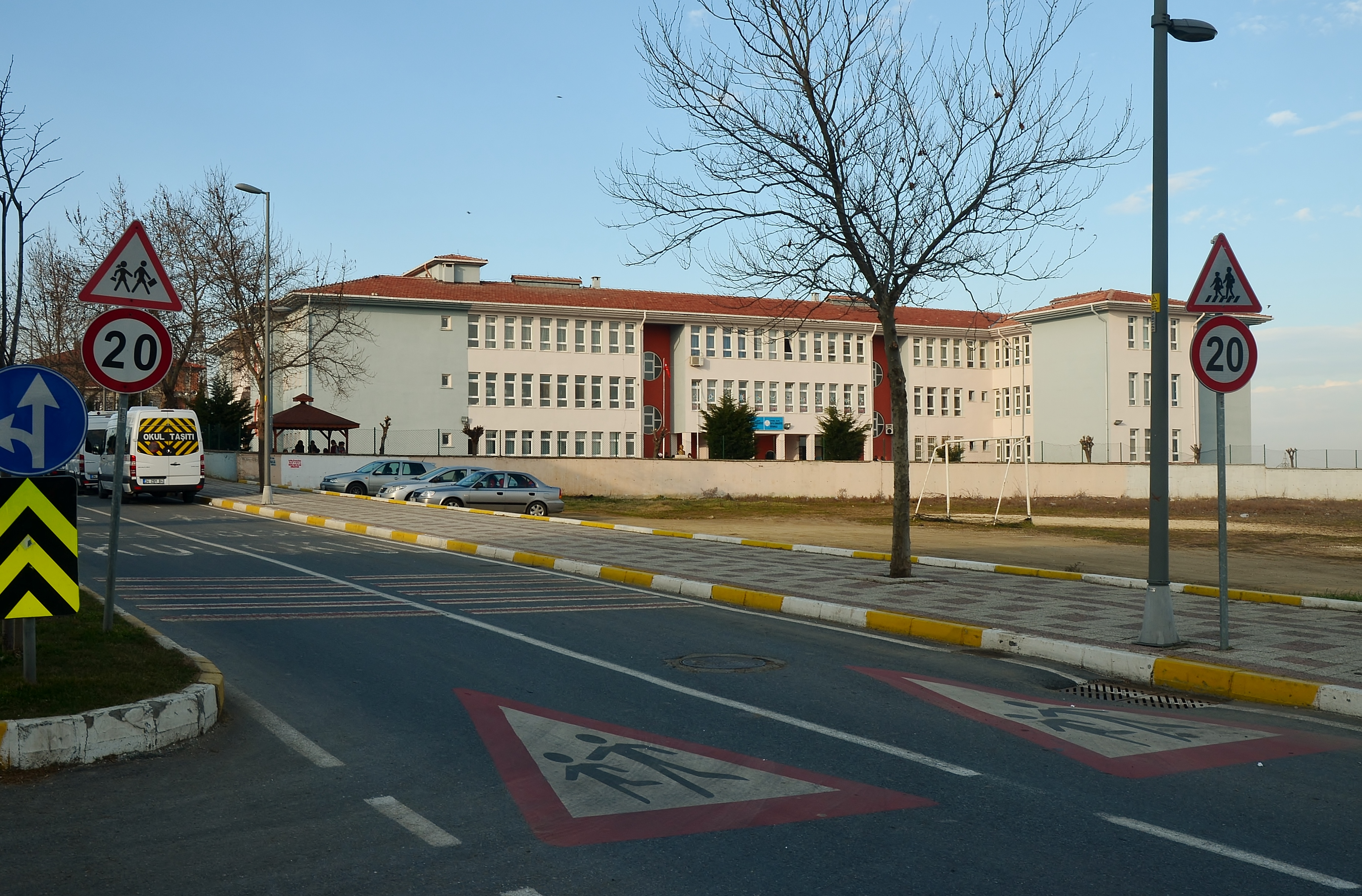
- Primary school in Çanta

- Location within Turkey Location within Istanbul
- Coordinates: 41°04′50″N 28°04′55″E
- Country: Turkey
- Province: Istanbul
- District: Silivri
- Population (2022): 10,201
- Time zone: UTC+3 (TRT)
- Postal code: 34570, 34580
- Area code: 0212

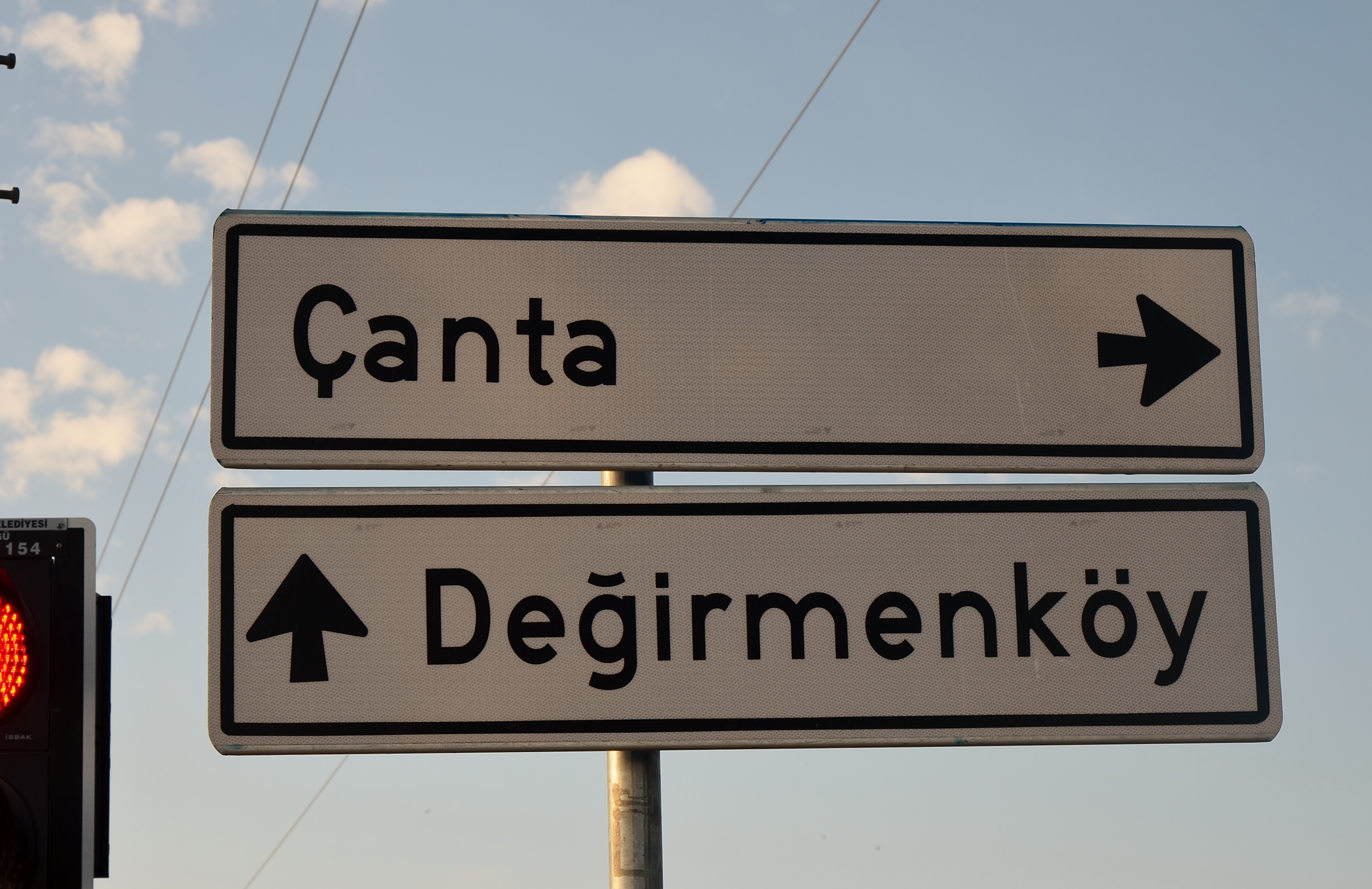
Road sign to Çanta at State road D.100.

Çanta (Turkish, 'bag') is a settlement in the municipality and district of Silivri, Istanbul Province, Turkey. It consists of two neighbourhoods: Çanta Balaban and Çanta Sancaktepe. Its population is 10,201 (2022). Çanta was an independent municipality until it was merged into the municipality of Silivri in 2008. It is on the European side of the city. It is accessible from the state road D.100 that runs from Istanbul to Edirne.

== Population ==
Historical population
| Year | Pop. | ±% p.a. |
|---|---|---|
| 1970 | 1,709 | — |
| 1975 | 1,688 | −0.25% |
| 1980 | 1,843 | +1.77% |
| 1985 | 1,988 | +1.53% |
| 1990 | 1,835 | −1.59% |
| 1997 | 4,430 | +13.42% |
| 2007 | 5,869 | +2.85% |
| 2012 | 5,111 | −2.73% |
| 2017 | 8,102 | +9.65% |
| 2022 | 10,201 | +4.72% |
Source: TÜIK (2007-2022)

== See also ==
- Çanta Wind Farm
