= Climate TRACE =

Group which monitors greenhouse gas emissions

- Formation: July 1, 2020; 6 years ago
- Type: Nonprofit
- Website: climatetrace.org

Climate TRACE (Tracking Real-Time Atmospheric Carbon Emissions) is an independent group which monitors and publishes greenhouse gas emissions. It launched in 2021 before COP26, and improves monitoring, reporting and verification (MRV) of both carbon dioxide and methane. The group monitors sources such as coal mines and power station smokestacks worldwide, with satellite data (but not their own satellites) and artificial intelligence.

Time magazine named it as one of the hundred best inventions of 2020. Their emissions map is the largest global inventory and interactive map of greenhouse gas emission sources. According to Kelly Sims Gallagher it could influence the politics of climate change by reducing MRV disputes, and lead to more ambitious climate pledges.

Developed countries' annual reports to the UNFCCC are submitted over a year after the end of the monitored year. Developing countries in the Paris Agreement submit every two years. Some large emitters, such as Iran which has not ratified the agreement, have not submitted a greenhouse gas inventory in the 2020s.

New data is released monthly 2 months after the emissions.

== Methods ==
Power plant emissions are tracked by training software with supervised learning to combine satellite imagery with other open data, such as government datasets, OpenStreetMap, and company reports. Similarly large ships will be tracked to better understand emissions from international shipping.

== Members ==
As of 2023, the coalition consists of:

- Nonprofits: CarbonPlan, Earthrise Alliance, Global Energy Monitor, Hudson Carbon, OceanMind, Rocky Mountain Institute, TransitionZero, and WattTime
- Companies: Blue Sky Analytics and Hypervine
- Former U.S. Vice President Al Gore

== See also ==
- Glossary of climate change
