= Great Satraps' Revolt =

Rebellion by satraps against Achaemenid king Artaxerxes II (372–362 BC)

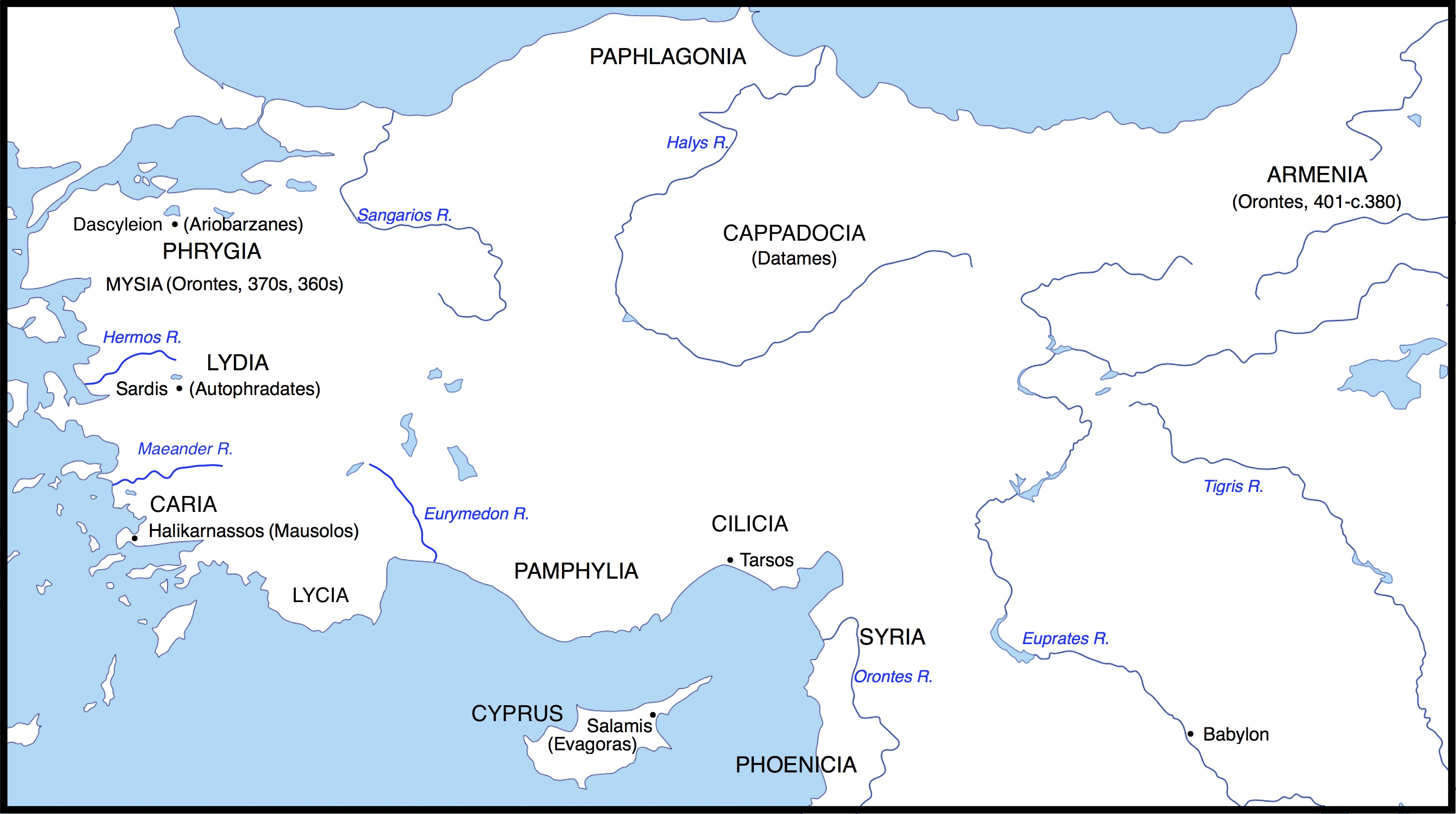
| Date | 370 BCE – 360 BCE |
| Location | Western Anatolia, Achaemenid Empire |
| Result | Revolt suppressed |

Belligerents
| Achaemenid Empire | Rebel satrapies |

Commanders and leaders
| Artaxerxes II | Datames †; Ariobarzanes of Phrygia (executed); Orontes I Autophradates; Mausolus |

The Great Satraps' Revolt, or the Revolts of the Satraps (c. 370-c.360 BCE), was a rebellion in the Achaemenid Empire of several satraps in western Anatolia against the authority of the Great King Artaxerxes II (r. 404-359/8). The Satraps who revolted were Datames, Ariobarzanes, Orontes, Autophradates, and Mausolus. The timing of their revolts varied, as did the circumstances that induced them to rebel. Though often portrayed as a general uprising, there was little coordination among them and at no time did they actually threaten Artaxerxes directly. Their efforts were aimed at secession rather than a takeover of the Empire.

== Revolt of Datames (370 BCE) ==
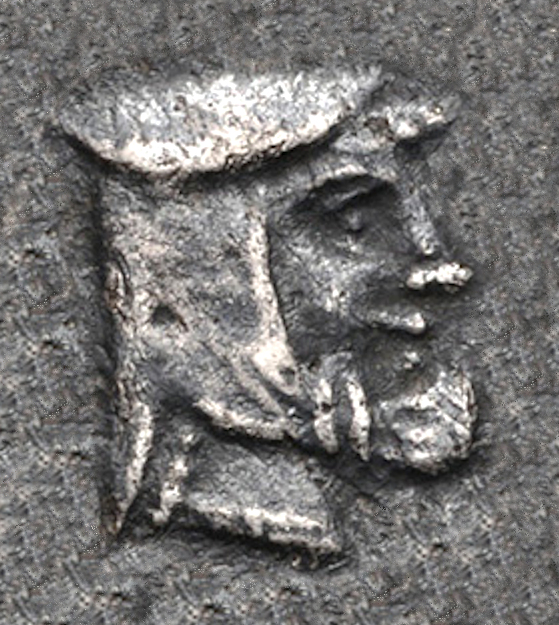
Satrap Datames started to revolt in 372 BC.

Datames, inherited a minor satrapy (name unknown) in northern Cilicia from his father Camissares some time after 384 BC. He was a talented military commander and distinguished himself in several campaigns: against the Cardusii, against the rebellious Thyus of Paphlagonia, and against Aspis of Cataonia. He was assigned to lead the King's army against Egypt when he learned that courtiers were, out of jealousy, speaking against him to Artaxerxes. Rather than wait for a recall, he abandoned his command and, taking a few trusted followers with him, went north to Paphlagonia, raised an army, and fortified the towns there.

Now on the defensive, he had to deal with the forces the King sent against him: first the Pisidians, then a massive army led by Autophradates of Lydia. He defeated the first and his engagement with the second was a protracted stalemate. Autophradates offered peace, which Datames accepted, knowing that the King would not honor it. And, indeed, Artaxerxes schemed with Mithradates, the son of Ariobarzanes, to lure him into a trap. Mithradates joined forces with Datames and together they ravaged the lands of the King. When Mithradates had gained his trust, he arranged a meeting in a field where he had hidden a sword. As the two men were talking, he drew the sword and killed Datames.

== Revolt of Ariobarzanes (366 BCE) ==
Ariobarzanes, satrap of Phrygia, was the son of Pharnaces II (r. c. 450-c. 413) and brother of Pharnabazus (r. c. 413-387), his predecessors. Pharnabazus had been recalled to Artaxerxes' court in 387, where he married the King's daughter Apame and fathered a son, Artabazus. In 366, the King sent Artabazus to the satrapy at Phrygia in place of his uncle. Ariobarzanes refused to cede his position, thus putting himself in revolt against the King. The latter sent Autophradates of Lydia against him, as well as Mausolus of Caria. At the same time the city of Sestos, a city on the Hellespont under his control, was attacked by Cotys of Thrace. To defend against these assaults he sought the aid of the aging Spartan king Agesilaus and the Athenian general Timotheus in 365. To compensate them for their help, he gave Agesilaus money and conferred to Athens on Timotheus' behalf the cities of Crithote and Sestos in the Chersonese. Honoring him in return, Athens made Ariobarzanes a citizen of Athens. In the end, Ariobarzanes was betrayed by his son Mithridates to Artaxerxes, who had Ariobarzanes crucified.

== Revolt of Orontes (362 BCE?) ==
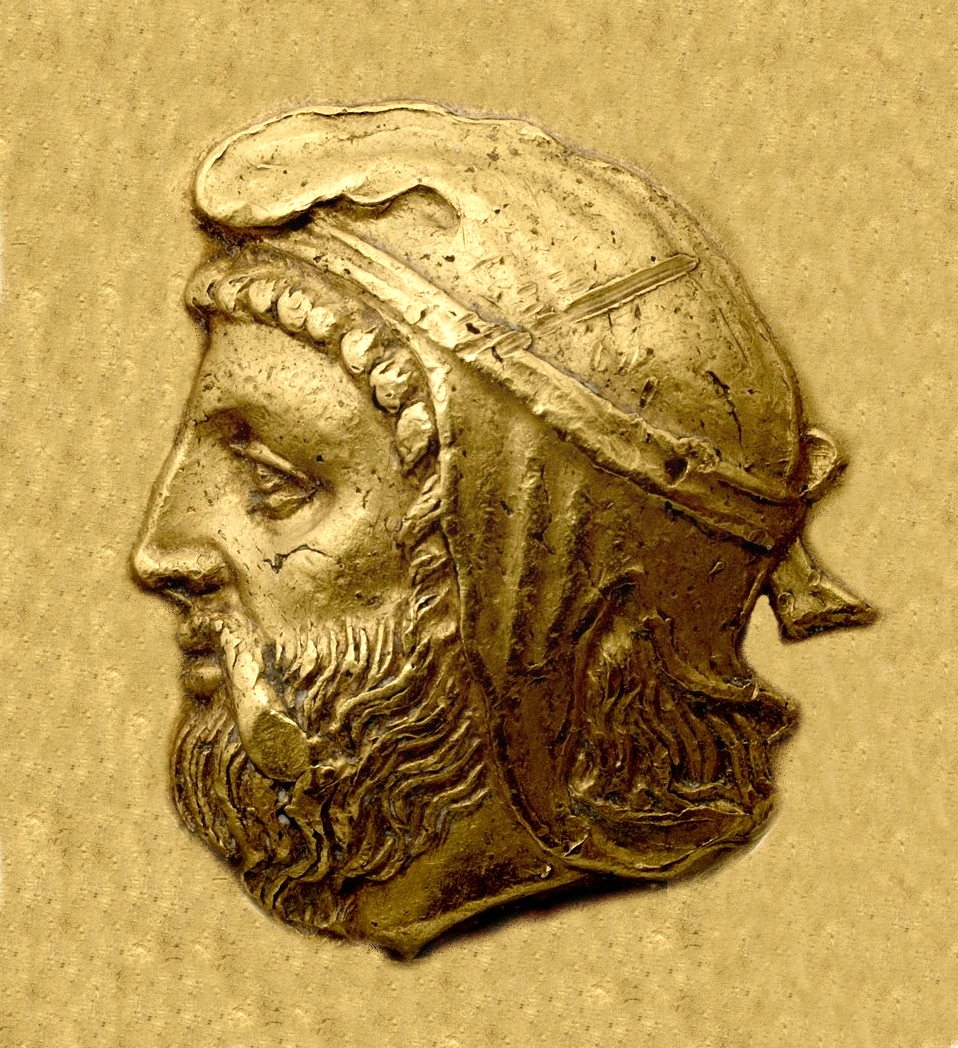
Orontes, wearing the satrapal headdress, from his coinage.

Orontes was the son of Artasuras and married to Artaxerxes' daughter Rhodogunê. He was satrap of Armenia in 401 when Xenophon's Ten Thousand marched through that region after the battle of Cunaxa. In 380, when he and Tiribazus (then satrap of Lydia) were besieging Evagoras, king of Salamis on Cyprus, he made false accusations against Tiribazus (who had been hyparch under him in Armenia) that got him demoted to the minor satrapy of Mysia, on the border between Phrygia and Lydia. His resentment at this decline in his fortunes is presumed to be behind his rebellion, but why it occurred at this time is unknown. Diodorus Siculus said that:

The peoples who had revolted from the King chose as their general Orontes in charge of all branches of the administration.

Those associating with Orontes do not appear to be the other men named here. Diodorus went on to say that among the rebels were "Lycians, Pisidians, Pamphylians, and Cilicians, likewise Syrians, Phoenicians, and practically all the coastal peoples".

Having received funds sufficient to pay twenty thousand men for a year, he assembled an army of mercenaries in order to defend against the forces sent after him by the King. He fought off a siege at Mt. Tmolus, south of Sardis, and later fought against Autophradates at Cyme, on the coast, both times successfully routing his pursuers. In the end, though, he betrayed his compatriots, arresting the leaders and delivering them to Artaxerxes, thus putting himself back the good graces of the King.

There is a reference to Orontes in Demosthenes' On the Symmories (a.k.a. On the Navy Boards) of 354 that has led some to surmise that he rebelled a second time against Artaxerxes' successor, but there is no other information to corroborate this.

== Revolt of Autophradates (362 BCE?) ==
Autophradates was satrap of Lydia from the start of Artaxerxes' war with Evagoras (see above under Orontes). He relieved Tiribazus when he was assigned to lead the navy in that engagement - this sometime in the 380s. When the satraps around him revolted, he was tasked by the King with leading armies against them, noted above. There are numerous references to these campaigns in ancient sources. For the most part, they were unsuccessful.

At some point, he decided to join them, for Diodorus included him among his list of men who rebelled. There is no record of what he did during this hiatus or how long it lasted, but at some point he was reinstated. He was called upon in the 350s to put down Eubulus of Atarneus. According to Aristotle:

There is a story that Eubulus, when Autophradates was going to besiege Atarneus, told him to consider how long the operation would take, and then reckon up the cost which would be incurred in the time. "For", said he, "I am willing for a smaller sum than that to leave Atarneus at once." These words of Eubulus made an impression on Autophradates, and he desisted from the siege.

== Revolt of Mausolus ==
Diodorus included Mausolus of Caria in his list of revolting satraps, but other than this mention, there is no record of any specific actions against the Empire. He did participate in the attacks on Ariobarzanes (see above) but broke off at the instigation (bribe?) of Agesilaus - and perhaps this is the reason for including him. Whatever else he did during the revolt, he was ultimately reconciled with the King and kept his position until his death in 353.

== Ancient Sources ==
- Aristotle, Politics: http://www.perseus.tufts.edu/hopper/text?doc=Perseus%3atext%3a1999.01.0058
- Cornelius Nepos, Lives of the Eminent Commanders: https://www.tertullian.org/fathers/nepos.htm
- Demosthenes, Against Aristocrates, xxiii: http://www.perseus.tufts.edu/hopper/text?doc=Dem.+23&fromdoc=Perseus%3Atext%3A1999.01.0072
- Demosthenes, On the Symmories, xiv: http://www.perseus.tufts.edu/hopper/text?doc=Perseus%3atext%3a1999.01.0072%3aspeech%3d14
- Diodorus Siculus, Library of History: https://penelope.uchicago.edu/Thayer/E/Roman/Texts/Diodorus_Siculus/15E*.html
- Polyaenus, Strategems: http://www.attalus.org/translate/polyaenus7.html
- Xenophon, Agesilaus: http://www.perseus.tufts.edu/hopper/text?doc=Perseus%3atext%3a1999.01.0210%3atext%3dAges.
- Xenophon, Cyropaedia: http://www.perseus.tufts.edu/hopper/text?doc=Perseus%3atext%3a1999.01.0204
- Xenophon, Hellenica: http://www.perseus.tufts.edu/hopper/text?doc=Perseus%3atext%3a1999.01.0206

== Modern Sources ==
- Beloch, Karl Julius, Griechische Geschicht, zweite neugestaltete auflage, vol. III, Part 2. Berlin: Vereinigung Wissenschaftlicher Verleger, 1923.
- Briant, Pierre. From Cyrus to Alexander: A History of the Persian Empire. Translated by Peter T. Daniels. Winona Lake, Indiana: Eisenbrauns, 2002.
- Brosius, Maria (2006). The Persians: an introduction. Taylor & Francis. ISBN 9780415320894.
- Gershevitch, Ilya (1985). The Cambridge history of Iran: The Median and Achaemenian periods. Cambridge University Press. ISBN 9780521246996. p386
- Heskel, Julia (1997). The North Aegean wars, 371-360 B.C. Franz Steiner Verlag. ISBN 9783515069175. p94
- Moysey, Robert A. “Plutarch, Nepos and the Satrapal Revolt of 362/1 B.C.” Historia: Zeitschrift für Alte Geschichte 41, no. 2 (1992): 158-68. www.jstor.org/stable/4436235.
- Nelson Frye, Richard (1984). The history of ancient Iran. Vol. 3. C.H.Beck. ISBN 9783406093975.
