= Alceunas =

Alceunas (Ancient Greek: Ἀλκεύνης; Latin: Alceunas ) was a chieftain or military commander of the Cadusians, mentioned in ancient literature. During the era of Cyrus II (the Great), while Datamas was officially responsible for the Cadusians, the tribe was effectively governed by Alceunas.

== History ==
The primary source of information regarding Alceunas is the work of the ancient Greek historian Xenophon, titled Cyropaedia. According to the narrative, Alceunas was active during the rise of the Persian king Cyrus the Great. In Book V of Cyropaedia, it is described that the Cadusians—a warlike and independent people—voluntarily joined Cyrus's army to fight against the Assyrians. Alceunas is presented as one of the leaders of this contingent.

Alceunas appears in an episode involving unauthorized actions by the Cadusians. While Cyrus's main army was resting, the Cadusians, led by their chieftain, launched an independent raid into enemy territory. The raid ended in failure; the Cadusians fell into an ambush set by the Assyrian king and suffered heavy losses. According to Xenophon, Cyrus the Great used this defeat to strengthen his authority by showing care for the wounded Cadusians and personally honoring the memory of the fallen warriors and their leader.
