= Cilicia =

Geographical region in Turkey

Cilicia قيليقية Կիլիկիա Κιλικία Kēlak Kilikya
- Geographical region
- Cilicia in the Roman Empire
- Coordinates: 36.985°N 35.120°E
- Country: Turkey
- Largest city: Adana
- Provinces: Mersin, Adana, Osmaniye, Hatay

Area
  - Total: 38,585.16 km^{2} (14,897.81 sq mi)

Population (2022)
  - Total: 6,435,986
  - Density: 166.7995/km^{2} (432.0088/sq mi)
- Demonym(s): Cilician(s) (English); Kilikyalı (Turkish); Kēlak (Kurdish); Կիլիկյան (Armenian)
- Time zone: UTC+03:00 (TRT)
- Postal code prefixes: 33xxx, 01xxx, 80xxx, 31xxx
- Area codes: 324, 322, 328, 326
- GRP (nominal): $43.14 billion (2018)
- GRP per capita: $6,982 (2018)
- Languages: Turkish, Arabic, Kurmanji, Armenian

Cilicia (/sɪˈlɪʃə/ sil-ISH-ə) (Note: Known less often as Kilikia (Armenian: Կիլիկիա, romanized: Kilikia; Ancient Greek: Κιλικία, romanized: Kilikía; Kurdish: Kēlak, lit. 'side, bank'; Turkish: Kilikya).) is a geographical region of southern Anatolia in West Asia, extending inland from the northeastern coasts of the Mediterranean Sea. Cilicia borders Pamphylia to the west, Lycaonia and Cappadocia to the north, Commagene to the north-east, Syria to the east and the Mediterranean Sea to the south. Cilicia has a population ranging over six million, concentrated mostly at the Cilician plain (Turkish: Çukurova). The region includes the provinces of Mersin, Adana, Osmaniye, and Hatay.

== Name ==
The name of Cilicia (Κιλικία) was derived from the Akkadian toponym Ḫilakku (𒆳𒄭𒋃𒆪), which was the name used by the Neo-Assyrian Empire to designate the western part of what would become Cilicia.

The English spelling Cilicia is the same as the Latin, as it was transliterated directly from the Greek form Κιλικία. The palatalization of c occurring in Western Europe in later Vulgar Latin (c. 500–700) accounts for its modern pronunciation in English.

== Geography ==
Cilicia is located on the southern coast of Anatolia, and it historically extended from Coracesium or the river Melas in the west to the Amanus Mountains in the east, while to the north and northwest it was bounded by the Taurus Mountains, which are passable in very few places, such as the Cilician Gates, and in the south it was bounded by the Gulf of Iskenderun.

Cilicia consisted of two main contrasting regions:

- to the west was a mountainous region characterised by rough terrain, corresponding to the Neo-Assyrian period territory of Ḫilakku and the Graeco-Roman region of Rough Cilicia;
- to the east was a flat and water-rich fertile region defined by a smooth terrain, corresponding to the Neo-Assyrian period territory of Ḫiyawa and the Graeco-Roman region of Plain Cilicia.

The western mountainous part of Cilicia was called Rugged Cilicia or Rough Cilicia (Ancient Greek: Κιλικία Τραχεῖα, romanized: Kilikía Trakheîa; Latin: Cilicia Aspera), while the eastern region was dominated by the alluvial plain of the rivers Cydnus, Sarus, and Pyramus, and was therefore known as Plain Cilicia or Flat Cilicia (Ancient Greek: Κιλικία Πεδιάς, romanized: Kilikía Pediás; Latin: Cilicia Campestris).

Although Cilicia's boundaries are difficult to traverse, it has important access routes which have connected it since antiquity with the neighbouring North Syrian Plain in the east and the Anatolian Highlands in the north:

- the most important of these passages across the Taurus Mountains are the course of the Göksu River which ends near Mut to the southeast of Konya, and the Cilician Gates to the north of Tarsus which opens on Porsuk near Tyana. The upper reaches of the Seyhan and Ceyhan rivers were however more difficult to cross and were therefore of little importance for trade in antiquity.
- two important passes also allowed passage through the Amanus Mountains: the Amanian Gate, now known as the Bahçe Pass, led into the plain of İslahiye, which was a side valley of the Amuq Plain in Hatay; as well as the southern Amanus Pass or Syrian Gates, now known as the Beilan Pass, which lay at the end of a southern route branching off at Osmaniye and following the coast through Issus and İskenderun, and opened into the Orontes Plain near Alalaḫ or Antioch. These two routes provided access from Cilicia to the plains of the northern Levant and Mesopotamia.

The most important route of the Cilician Plain, since antiquity, has run from the Amanus passes to the Taurus passes. This route comes from northern Syria, crosses Plain Cilica westward through Adana and Tarsus, and finally continues into Anatolia. In modern times, this route corresponds to the trajectory of a motorway, a national highway, and the Baghdad Railway built in the early 20th century AD. The distribution of ancient settlements along this axis suggests that this route existed from as early as the Chalcolithic Period.

Salamis, the city on the east coast of Cyprus, was included in the Roman province of Cilicia from 58 BC until 27 BC.

=== Rough Cilicia ===
Rough Cilicia (Ancient Greek: Κιλικία Τραχεῖα, romanized: Kilikía Trakheîa; Latin: Cilicia Aspera; Neo-Assyrian Akkadian: 𒆳𒄭𒋃𒆪, romanized: Ḫilakku; Neo-Babylonian Akkadian: 𒆳𒉿𒆸𒁺, romanized: Pirindu) is a rugged mountain district formed by the spurs of Taurus, which often terminate in rocky headlands with small sheltered harbours, features which, in classical times, made the coast a string of havens for pirates and, in the Middle Ages, outposts for Genoese and Venetian traders. The district is watered by the Calycadnus and was covered in ancient times by forests that supplied timber to Phoenicia and Egypt. Cilicia lacked large cities.

=== Plain Cilicia ===
Plain Cilicia (Ancient Greek: Κιλικία Πεδιάς, romanized: Kilikía Pediás; Latin: Cilicia Campestris; Neo-Assyrian Akkadian: 𒆳𒄣𒂊, romanized: Que; Neo-Babylonian Akkadian: 𒆳𒄷𒈨𒂊, romanized: Ḫuwê), to the east, included the rugged spurs of Taurus and a large coastal plain, with rich loamy soil, known to Greeks such as Xenophon (who passed through with his mercenary group of the Ten Thousand,) for its abundance (euthemia), filled with sesame and millet and olives and pasturage for the horses imported into ancient Israel by King Solomon. Many of its high places were fortified.

The plain is watered by multiple rivers originating in the Tauris Mountains, with the three most important of these being:

- the Berdan River (Ancient Greek: Κύδνος, romanized: Kúdnos; Latin: Cydnus),
- the Seyhan River (Ancient Greek: Σάρος, romanized: Sáros; Latin: Sarus),
- and the Ceyhan River (Ancient Greek: Πύραμος, romanized: Púramos; Latin: Pyramus).

=== Climate ===
The climate of Cilicia shows significant differences between the mountains and the lower plains. At the lower plains, the climate reflects a typical Mediterranean style; summers are hot while winters are mild, making the land, particularly, the eastern plains, fertile. In the coldest month (January), the average temperature is 9 °C, and in the warmest month (August), the average temperature is 28 °C. The mountains of Cilicia have an inland climate with snowy winters. The average annual precipitation in the region is 647 mm and the average number of rainy days in a year is 76. Mersin and surrounding areas have the highest average temperature in Cilicia. Mersin also has high annual precipitation (1096 mm) and 85 rainy days in a year.

The Cilician Plain possesses fertile soils, a hot climate, and abundant water resources thanks to enough rainfalls and multiple rivers, which make it one of the most productive agricultural regions of present-day Turkey. A large number of burial mounts from every era of human presence there shows that these favourable conditions have been conducive to intensive human settlement in Plain Cilicia from the Neolithic Period.

=== Geology ===
The mountains of Cilicia are formed from ancient limestones, conglomerate, marlstone, and similar materials. The Taurus Mountains are composed of karstic limestone, while its soil is also limestone-derived, with pockets of volcanic soil. The lower plain is an extremely important alluvial plain in Turkey. Expansion of limestone formations and fourth-era alluvials brought by the rivers Seyhan and Ceyhan formed the plains of the region over the course of time.

Akyatan, Akyayan, Salt Lake, Seven lakes at Aladağ, and Karstik Dipsiz lake near Karaisalı are the lakes of the region. The reservoirs in the region are Seyhan, Çatalan, Yedigöze, Kozan and Mehmetli.

The major rivers in Cilicia are Seyhan, Ceyhan, Berdan (Tarsus), Asi and Göksu.

- Seyhan River emerges from the confluence of Zamantı and Göksu rivers which originate from Kayseri Province and flows into the Gulf of Mersin. The river is 560 km long.
- Ceyhan River emerges from the confluence of the Aksu and Hurman rivers and flows towards Cape Hürmüz at the Gulf of İskenderun. It is 509 km long and it forms the Akyayan, Akyatan, and Kakarat lakes before flowing into the Mediterranean.
- Berdan River originates from the Taurus Mountains and flows into the Mediterranean south of Tarsus.
- Göksu river originates from the Taurus Mountains and flows into the Mediterranean 16 km southeast of Silifke. It forms the Göksu Delta, including Akgöl Lake and Paradeniz Lagoon.

== History ==
Plain Cilicia formed an important link between Syria, and, by extension, Mesopotamia and Egypt as well, with Cyprus and the Anatolian highlands for several periods.

=== Neolithic ===
Due to its propitious environmental conditions, Plain Cilicia has been intensively settled by humans since the Neolithic Period.

During the Neolithic Period, ceramic wares from Cilicia show links to northern Syria and northern Mesopotamia, as well as to the ceramics of Inner Anatolia. Influences from the Halaf culture of northern Mesopotamia are visible in Cilicia in this period, and so are influences from the Ubaid culture.

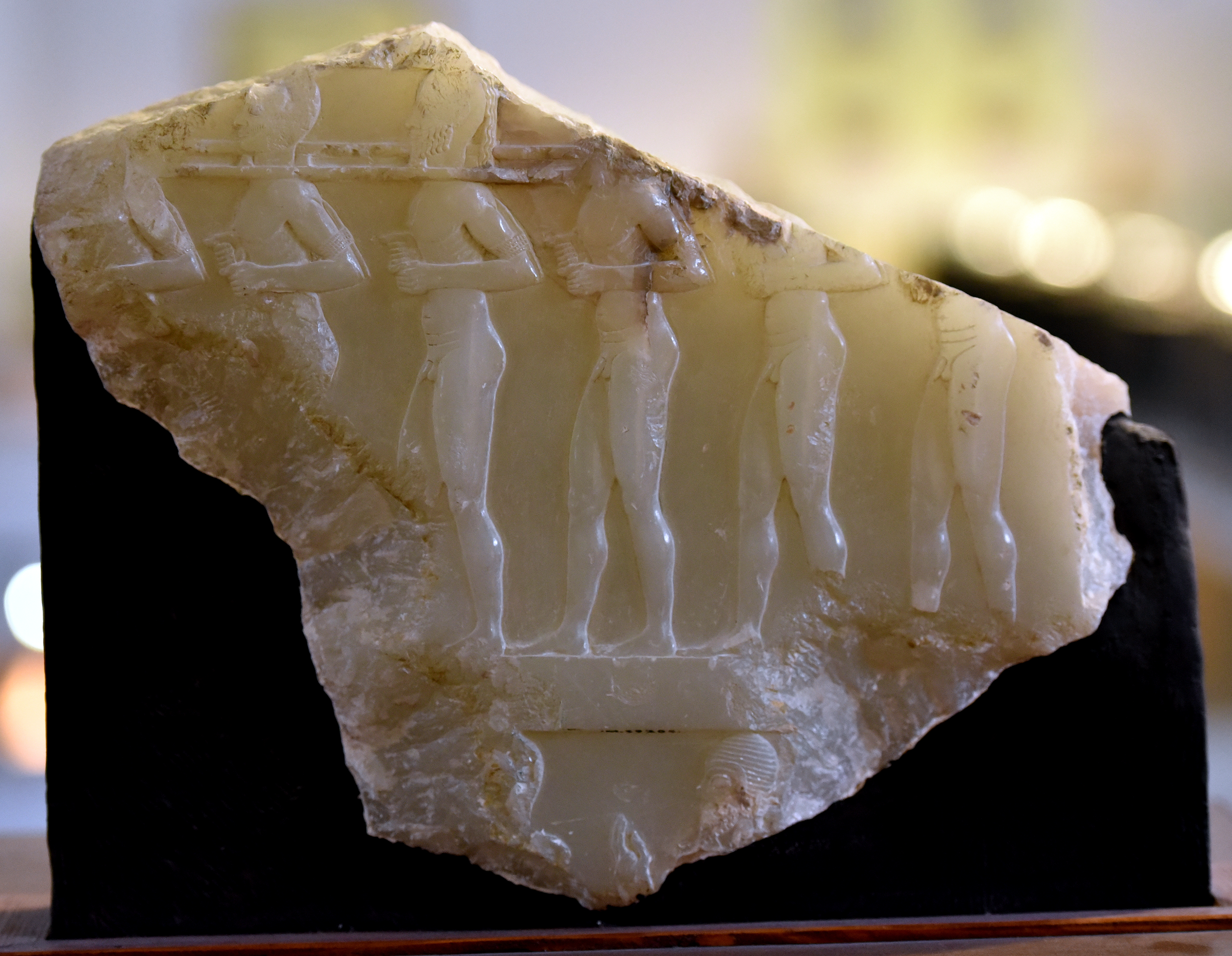
Probable captives from Cilicia, on the Nasiriyah stele of Naram-Sin, circa 2200 BC.

=== Chalcolithic ===
During the Chalcolithic Period, close contacts existed between Cilicia and the Amuq E and F cultures of the nearby Amuq Plain.

During the Late Chalcolithic Period, when the Uruk period culture spread in Mesopotamia, Cilicia exhibited closer cultural links to the Anatolian Highlands.

=== Bronze Age ===
Beginning in the Early Bronze Age II period, and especially during the Early Bronze Age III period, which corresponds to the Early Bronze Age I-IV of the northern Levant, Syrian-Levantine influence on Cilician pottery was more intensely felt, resulting in the appearance of special types of pottery such as Metallic Ware and Syrian Flasks. Thus, Cilicia moved away from influence by the Anatolian cultural sphere and towards the northern Syrian cultural zone during the early Bronze Age, with this latter one persisting until the Middle Bronze Age.

Cilicia is not mentioned in any ancient texts in the 3rd millennium BC, and even the sources of Ebla do not refer to it.

The first recognisable mentions of the Cilician Plain instead are from between c. 2000 and c. 1750 BC, with the Story of Sinuhe, which takes place during the reign of Senusret I (r. 1971 – 1926 BC), referring to a ḫantawattis from the south of the land of Kawa, who can be located in Plain Cilicia; the Luwian title of this ruler shows that the ruling class of Cilicia during this period were Luwians.

An Egyptian inscription from the reign of Senusret I's successor, Amenemhat II (r. 1929 – 1895 BC), mentioned the port city of Ura. There is otherwise no information about the political situation of Cilicia from the period lasting from c. 2000 to c. 1500 BC, with neither the letters of Assyrian traders in Kaniš nor the royal correspondence of the palace at Mari providing any information about Cilicia.

Archaeological remains from this period derive almost solely from Tarsus, Mersin, Kinet Höyük and Sirkeli Höyük. Beginning in the Bronze Age IA, which is when the land of Kawa was mentioned in the Story of Sinuhe, Painted Syro-Cilician Ware became prevalent in large parts of the Levant and Syria, which, in addition to its similarities with Khabur Ware and Levantine Painted Ware, showed close connections between Cilicia and these regions. Contacts between Cilicia and Central Anatolia are discernible in the forms of the ceramics, such as spouted jugs found at Sirkeli Höyük, as well as by the dominance of Central Anatolian house types at Tarsus and Mersin.

Before the end of the Middle Bronze Age, the Hurrian language and religion had spread into Cilicia, where the Hurrian and Luwian components were dominant among the population of the region from the period lasting from c. 1500 to c. 1250 BC.

During the Late Bronze Age, Cilicia was dominated by the kingdom of Kizzuwatna which came into existence during the middle of the 2nd millennium BC, at the time of the Hittite king Ammuna, and was an independent power as well as a buffer between the Hittite Empire and the kingdom of Mitanni. During this period, silver from this region was exported to Middle Kingdom Egypt.

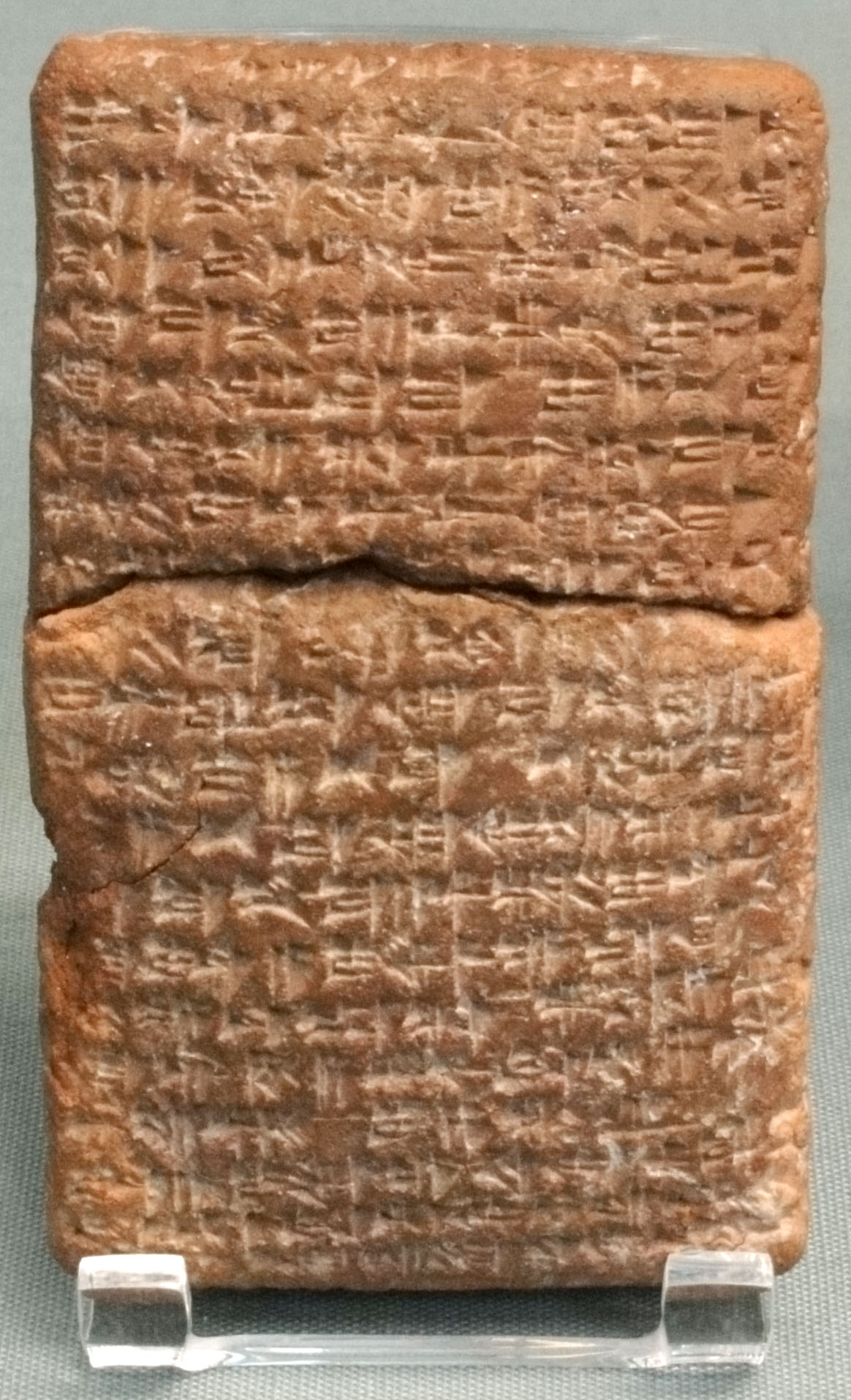
Fugitive slave treaty between Idrimi of Alalakh (now Tell Atchana) and Pilliya of Kizzuwatna (now Cilicia), (c. 1480 BC) Ref:131447 .

Even at this early period, Kizzuwatna was an important location for the Hittite Empire, since it provided the Hittites with access to Syria, which was useful for trade and was strategically advantageous.

The border between Kizzuwatna and the Hittite kingdom was established by the treaty between Šunaššura of Kizzuwatna and Tudḫaliya I/II of the Hittites, according to which Kizzuwatna's most western city was to be Pitura on the coast and opposite of Lamiya (Classical Lamos), thus leaving the port-city of Ura under Hittite rule. Meanwhile, the southwest–northeast border of Kizzuwatna ran through the Taurus Mountains and included the upper reaches of the Šamri (Classical Saros) river.

Kizzuwatna was later annexed by the Hittites, possibly during the reigns of Arnuwanda I or Šuppiluliuma I, the latter of whom appointed Kantuzzili, and later Telipinu, as priest at Kummanni. The incorporation of Kizzuwatna into the Hittite Empire allowed Šuppiluliuma I to engage in an aggressively expansionist policy in Syria.

Kizzuwatna had a significant cultural influence on the Hittite Empire: its Hurrian and Luwian populations and being open to Syria, it influenced Hittite religion in many aspects.

In the Middle Bronze Age developed a far-reaching economic and socio-political system across the eastern Mediterranean, which was maintained by the palaces, and would reach its peak in the Late Bronze Age. Because of the dominance of the secular ruling classes in the economic, poilitical and ideological domains, it is referred to in research as a "Bronze Age palace culture," characterised by a reciprocal exchange system which included trade and prestige goods, craftsmen, and ideas. Evidence of this system is visible in the archaeological finds and texts from palaces like Knossos in Crete, Avaris in Egypt, Hattusa in Anatolia, and Ugarit, Alalaḫ and Qatna in the Levant, although the processes through which this interregional cultural exchange unfolded are still poorly understood.

The extent to which Cilicia was integrated into this international system, in which form did a palace culture develop there, and the degree to which it participated in the widespread exchange of luxury goods are also still currently unknown; until the present day, no palaces have been found and excavated in Cilicia. It is therefore also impossible to know which architectural styles from surrounding areas were borrowed by Cilician architecture, and whether certain luxury goods were imported and imitated there, as was the case in Syria.

The second half of the Late Bronze Age in Cilicia is characterised by Hittite Drab Ware and Red Lustrous Wheelmade Ware, whose origin was either from Cilicia itself or from Cyprus. Several Cypriot pottery imports and isolated Mycenaean shards also appeared in Tarsus at the same time as this ware, thus providing an outline of the cultural exchanges under way at this time. Influence from Central Anatolia was especially intense, as attested by the city wall in Mersin, which used the box-and-beam masonry technique based on Hittite models.

=== Iron Age ===
With the Bronze Age Collapse, Kizzuwatna also came to an end, and from its remains several local states emerged in Cilicia, which therefore became dominated by two main polities:

- in the east was Ḫiyawa, corresponding to Plain Cilicia, and referred to as Que in Neo-Assyrian sources and as Ḫuwê in Neo-Babylonian sources;
- in the west, corresponding to Rough Cilicia, was the state referred to as Ḫilakku in Neo-Assyrian sources and as Pirindu in Neo-Babylonian sources.

Both Hiyawa and Hilakku came under pressure from the Neo-Assyrian Empire from the 9th century BC, and more so in the 8th century BC, when they were temporarily annexed and made into Neo-Assyrian provinces. During the 1st millennium BC, silver from Cilicia was exported to Assyria.

During the 8th to 7th centuries BC, Greek traders and colonists established settlements on the Cilician coasts, such as Nagidos and Celenderis founded by Samos, Soli founded by Lindos; Greeks also established themselves in local settlements, such as at Anchiale and Tarsus.

==== Kingdom of Cilicia ====
Cilicia Κιλικία (Kilikía)
- Kingdom of Cilicia in 6th century BC
- Capital: Tarsus
- Demonym: Cilicians
- King
  - c. 585 BC: Syennesis I
- History
  - Established: c. 6th century BC
  - Submission to the Achaemenid Empire: c. 542 BC
  - Annexation by the Achaemenid Empire: 401 BC
Preceded by	Succeeded by
Tarḫuntašša	Cilicia (satrapy)
- Today part of: Turkey

Following the collapse of the Neo-Assyrian Empire, an independent state, called Cilicia (Ancient Greek: Κιλικία, romanized: Kilikía) by the ancient Greeks, was established in southeastern Anatolia in the 6th century BC under the rule of a native dynasty, with its capital at the city of Tarsus.

===== Submission to the Achaemenid Empire =====
In the mid-6th century BC, the kingdom of Cilicia supported the founding king of the Persian Achaemenid Empire, Cyrus II, in his wars against Croesus of Lydia, as a consequence of which Cilicia became a vassal of the Achaemenid empire as from c. 542 BC, and the Cilician rulers became part of the Achaemenid administration.

Under early Achaemenid rule, Cilicia maintained a significant degree of autonomy and the native rulers at Tarsus acted as satraps (governors) for the Achaemenid administration, with their authority extending until as far west as Aspendus.

Cilicia remained under efficient administration, and it would continue to provide troops for the Achaemenid wars in Anatolia, Egypt and Cyprus.

Achaemenid Cilicia
- Satrapy of the Achaemenid Empire
- c. 542 BC–333 BC
- Standard of Cyrus the Great

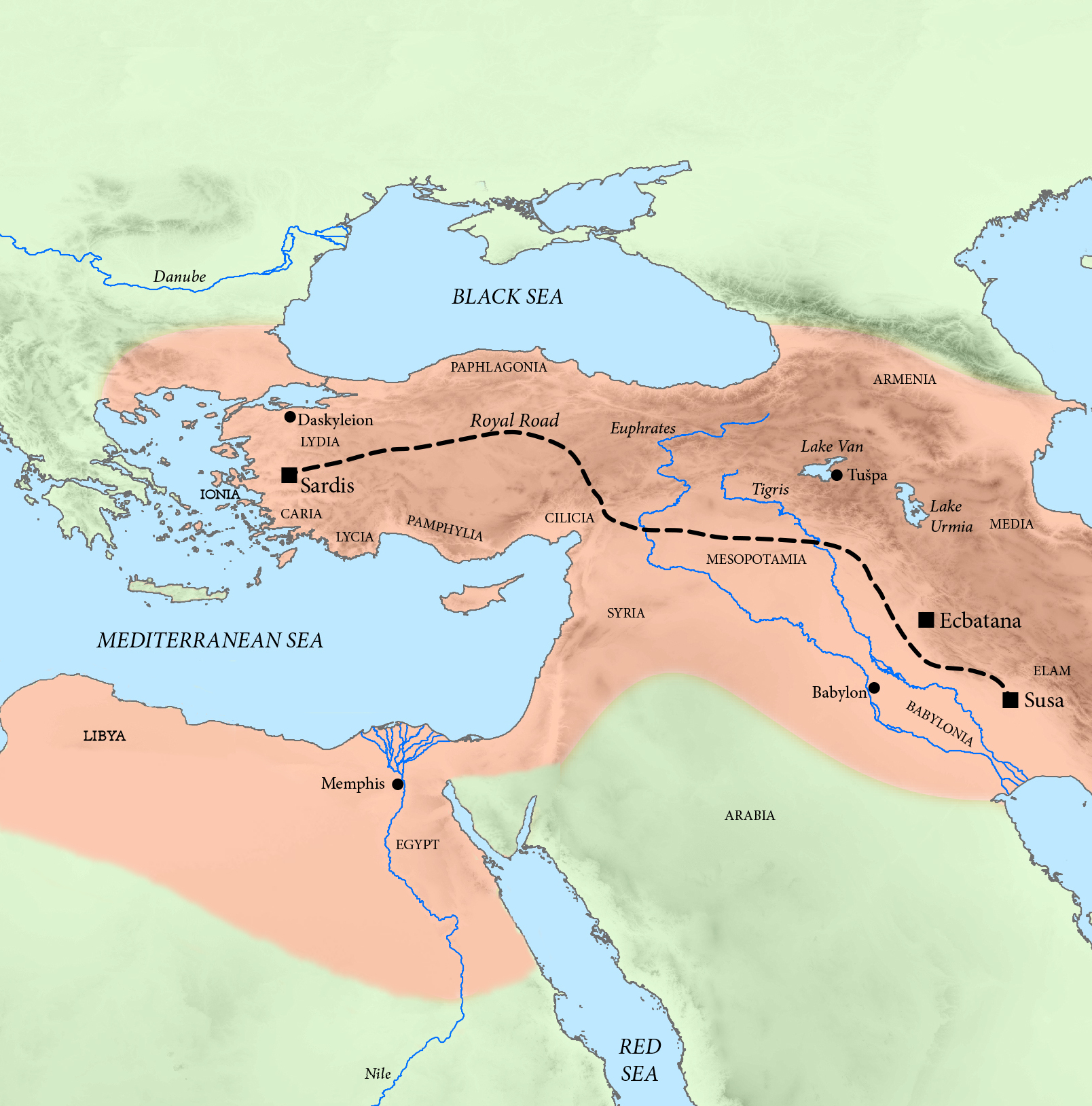
- Cilicia was located in the western part of the Achaemenid Empire, in south-east Anatolia.
- Capital: Tarsus
- Government
  - Type: Monarchy
- King of Kings
  - 405–358 BC: Artaxerxes II
  - 358–338 BC: Artaxerxes III
  - 338–336 BC: Arses
  - 336–330 BC: Darius III
- Satrap
  - c. 480 BC: Syennesis II
  - c. 470s BC: Xeinagoras of Halicarnassus
  - c. 401 BC: Syennesis III
  - c. 390s - c. 385 BC: Camisares
  - c. 385 - c. 362 BC: Datames
  - c. 340s - 333 BC: Mazaeus
- Historical era: Achaemenid era
  - Cyrus II's conquest of Babylon: c. 542 BC
  - Macedonian conquest of the Achaemenid Empire: 333 BC
Preceded by	Succeeded by
Kingdom of Cilicia	Macedonian Empire
- Today part of: Turkey

==== Satrapy of Cilicia ====
In 401 BC, the Achaemenid king of kings Artaxerxes II abolished the autonomy of Cilicia in reaction to the local Cilician ruler Syennesis III's support for the rebellion of Cyrus the Younger, resulting in the kingdom of Cilicia being abolished and fully integrated into the Achaemenid empire as a normal province ruled by and appointed by the Achaemenid king of kings, which it would remain until the end of the Achaemenid Empire in 333 BC.

Once the revolt of Cyrus the Younger had been suppressed, Cilicia was again used as an assembly point for Achaemenid forces in preparation for military action in the Aegean Sea during 396 to 395 BC, and against Cyprus in the 380s BC.

During the 390s BC, Camisares was appointed as satrap of Cilicia. Camisares was himself succeeded by his son, Datames, who eventually became the satrap of both Cilicia and Cappadocia until his assassination in c. 362 BC.

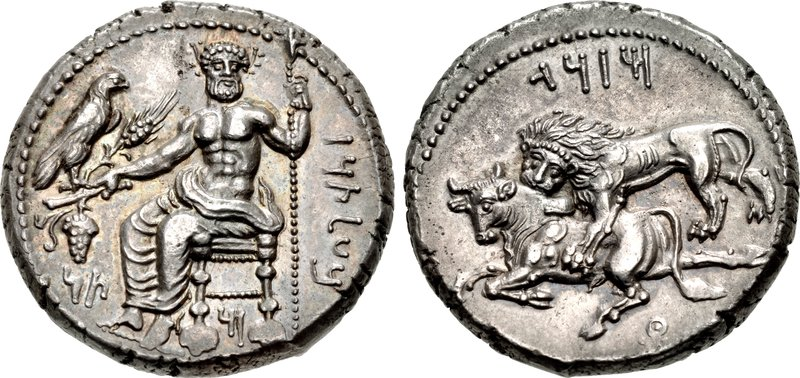
Coin of Mazaios. Satrap of Cilicia, 361/0-334 BC. Tarsos, Cilicia.

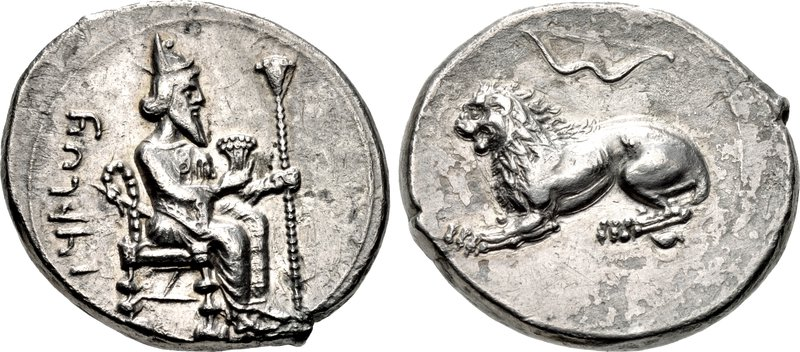
Coin of Mazaios, with Artaxerxes III as Pharaoh. Satrap of Cilicia, 361/0-334 BC. Tarsos, Cilicia.

In the 340s BC, the satrap of Cilicia was Mazaeus, who was also given authority over Syria as reward for his service in a campaign against Egypt.

=== Hellenistic period ===
Following the Battle of Issus, Cilicia became part of the empire of Alexander III of Macedon after he entered the region through the Cilician Gates in the Taurus Mountains without facing any resistance.

Alexander forded the Halys River in the summer of 333 BC, ending up on the border of southeastern Phrygia and Cilicia. He knew well the writings of Xenophon, and how the Cilician Gates had been "impassable if obstructed by the enemy". Alexander reasoned that by force alone he could frighten the defenders and break through, and he gathered his men to do so. In the cover of night, they attacked, startling the guards and sending them and their satrap into full flight, setting their crops aflame as they made for Tarsus. This good fortune allowed Alexander and his army to pass unharmed through the Gates and into Cilicia.

During Alexander III's invasion, a lesser officer named Arsames who had fled to Cilicia from the northwest to organise new resistance there defended it against the Macedonian forces.

During the Hellenistic period, Cilicia became disputed between the Ptolemaic Kingdom and the Seleucid Empire, with the latter being mostly in control of it, while the Teucrid dynasty ruled at the city of Olba.

Although no later Persian empire ever regained control of Cilicia, one Seleucid officer named Aribazus and attested as administrator of Cilicia in 246 BC was possibly of Persian descent.

During the Hellenistic era, numerous cities were established in Cilicia, which minted coins showing the badges (gods, animals, and objects) associated with each polis.

The Seleucids, especially Antiochus IV, focused on Hellenising Cilicia by establishing or rebuilding several poleis, such as Seleucia on the Calycadnus, Antioch on the Cydnus (Tarsus), Seleucia on the Pyramus (Mopsuestia), Hierapolis (Castabala), and Epiphaneia.

In the 3rd century BC, sporadic Ptolemaic presence was attested in Rugged Cilicia.

With the weakening of the Seleucid kingdom in the late 2nd century BC, piracy spread in the Mediterranean which had its main bases in Rugged Cilicia.

=== Roman and Byzantine periods ===
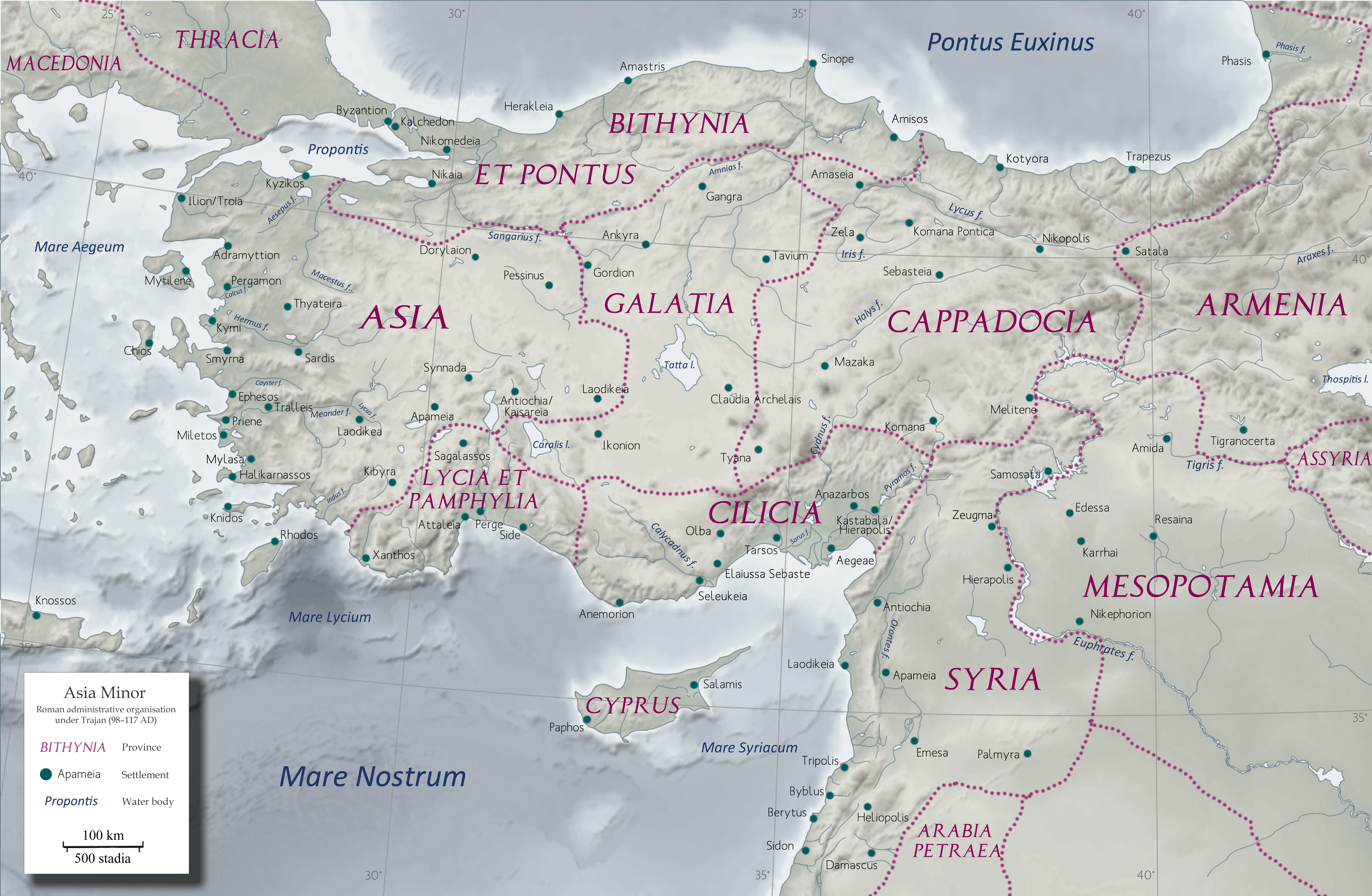
The Roman provinces of Asia Minor under Trajan, including Cilicia

In 102 BC, the Roman Republic established a provincia of the praetor Marcus Antonius in Cilicia to fight the Cilician pirates, with the command being renewed repeatedly.

In 83 BC, the Armenian king Tigranes II conquered Plain Cilicia, and he deported Cilicians to Tigranocerta.

Between 78 and 74 BC, Publius Servilius Vatia Isauricus conquered the population of Rugged Cilicia, which made a permanent Roman presence in Cilicia possible.

In 69 BC, Lucullus returned the Cilician deportees to Tigranocerta back to their homeland.

After Pompey was given the imperium proconsulare maius, he was able to defeat the Cilician pirates in 67 BC, and he arranged for his defeated enemies to be settled in Pompeiopolis (formerly Soli) and other depopulated Cilician towns. This victory strengthened the Roman presence in Cilicia, and in 64 BC the province was extended to include Plain Cilicia.

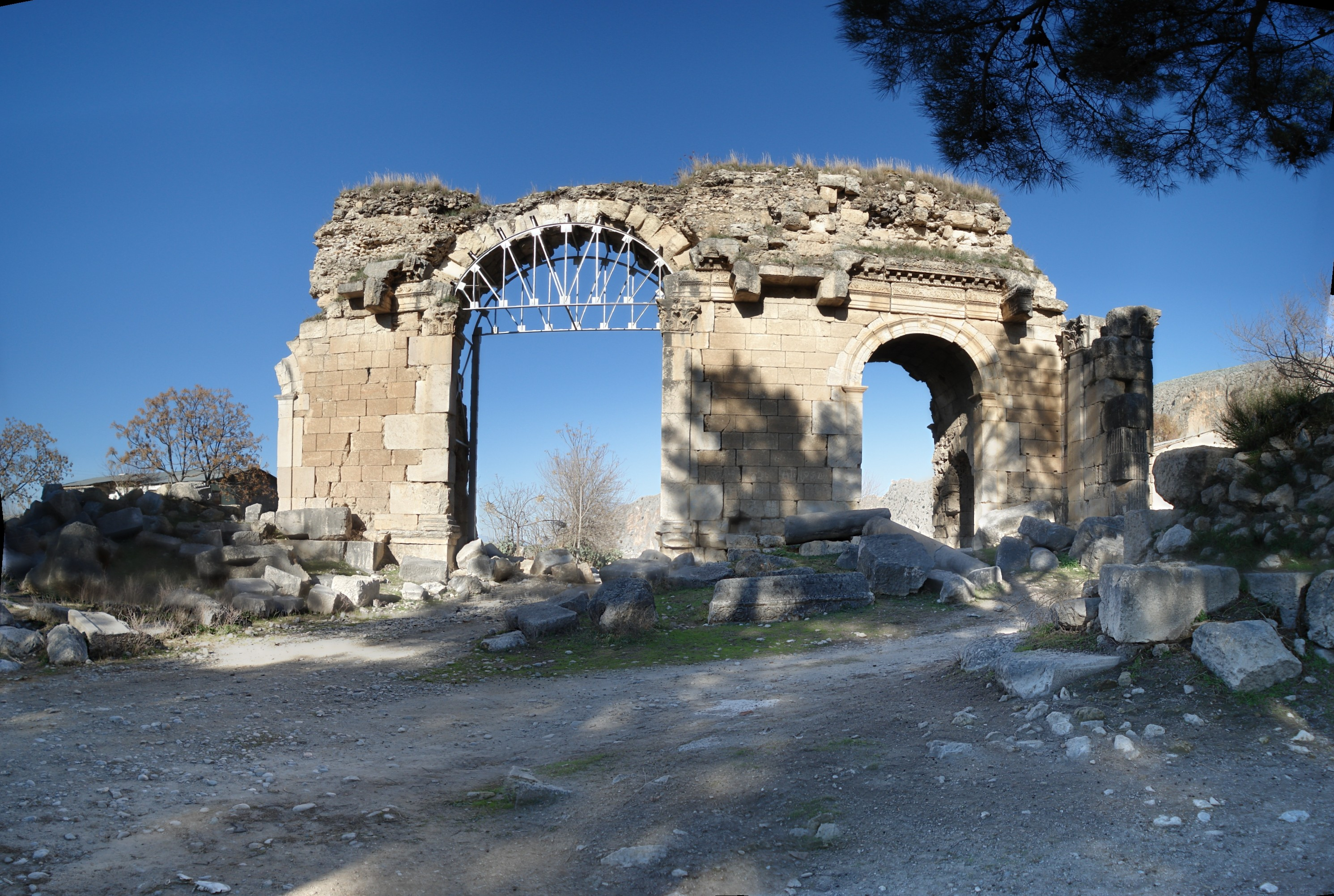
A Roman-period triumphal arch at Anazarbus, later converted into the city's south gate

In 56 BC, the province of Cilicia was temporarily extended to include a large inland territory reaching Phrygia so that it could protect the province of Asia and made the presence of a Roman garrison there unnecessary.

In 51 BC, the Parthian Empire was able to take advantage of the weakness of the Roman Republic to invade Cilicia (Parthian: 𐭊𐭉𐭋𐭊𐭉𐭀).

In 51 or 50 BC, the proconsul Cicero successfully campaigned in Cilicia against the Eleutherokilikes in the Amanus Mountains, which further solidified the Roman presence in CIlicia.

After Julius Caesar's death, the provincia of Cilicia was dissolved in 43 BC, and most of Rugged Cilicia was given to Amyntas of Galatia, then to Archelaus of Cappadocia. Plain Cilicia meanwhile was ruled by the kingdom of Tarcondimotus I as well as other smaller client-states of the Roman Republic, or administered as part of Syria.

Tarcondimotus I had supported the losing side of both Roman civil wars by offering naval support to Pompey and Mark Antony, due to which his son Tarcondimotus II Philopator was deposed in 30 BC, although he was restored to power between 20 BC and 17 AD.

Parts of Cilicia were given to Antiochus IV of Commagene by Caligula, who incorporated the rest of it into Syria.

A united province of Cilicia consisting of both Rugged and Plain Cilicia with Tarsus as capital was re-established in 72 AD by Vespasian.

During the early 2nd century AD, 39 cities of Cilicia issued coins.

In 194 AD, Septimius Severus defeated Pescennius Niger at the Cilician Gates. Under the Severan dynasty, during the late 2nd to early 3rd centuries AD, the city of Anazarbus, which was made into a metropolis, became a rival of Tarsus.

In 259 or 260, the Persian Sasanian king of kings Shapur I defeated the Roman Emperor Valerian, whose army included Cilician soldiers. After Valerian's defeat, the Sasanian forces burnt and sacked several cities in Syria, Cilicia (Middle Persian: 𐭪𐭫𐭪𐭩𐭠𐭩) and Cappadocia, and devastated large parts of Cilicia.

Under Diocletian's reforms, Cilicia was split into Cilicia Prima, Cilicia Secunda which included the northwestern part of Syria now known as Hatay, and a province named Isauria with its capital at Seleucia which included Rugged Cilicia.

Cilicia had numerous Christian communities and is mentioned six times in the Book of Acts and once in the Epistle to the Galatians (1:21). After Christianity became the official religion of the Roman Empire in the 4th century, Cilicia was included in the territories of the patriarchate of Antioch. The region was divided into two civil and ecclesiastical provinces: Cilicia Prima, with a metropolitan diocese at Tarsus and suffragan dioceses for Pompeiopolis, Sebaste, Augusta, Corycus, Adana, Mallus and Zephyrium; and Cilicia Secunda, with a metropolitan diocese at Anazarbus and suffragan dioceses for Mopsuestia, Aegae, Epiphania, Irenopolis, Flavias, Castabala, Alexandria, Citidiopolis and Rhosus. Bishops from the various dioceses of Cilicia were well represented at the First Council of Nicaea in 325 and at the later ecumenical councils.

In 400, Theodosius I divided Plain Cilicia into the provinces of Cilicia Prima, headquartered at Tarsus, and Cilicia Secunda, whose capital was Anazarbus.

The Christian Church in Cilicia was under the authority of the Patriarch of Antioch.

Cilicia remained prosperous, due to which several, largely ecclesiastical, construction works were undertaken there.

From the middle of the 7th century, Cilicia became more and more close to the border between the Byzantine Empire and the Caliphate, resulting in the depopulation of the region.

=== Early Islamic period ===
In the 7th century Cilicia was invaded by the Muslim Arabs. The area was for some time an embattled no-man's land. The Umayyad Caliphate conquered Cilicia around c. 700. Under the Abbasid Caliphate, Cilicia was resettled and transformed into a fortified frontier zone (thughur). Tarsus, re-built in 787/788, quickly became the largest settlement in the region and the Arabs' most important base in their raids across the Taurus Mountains into Byzantine-held Anatolia. Fortified settlements such as Ḥiṣn al-Tīnāt (identified with the Tüpraş Field near Kinet Höyük) were not only military posts but also played economic roles, showing that parts of coastal Cilicia functioned not merely as a border zone.

In medieval Arabic Cilicia was known as Ath-Thugur As-Shamiyya meaning "Levantine outskirts".

The Muslims held the country until it was reoccupied by the Emperor Nicephorus II in 965. During the Byzantine resettlement of Cilicia, many Armenians migrated to Cilicia, where they founded in 1071 the kingdom of Lesser Armenia.

=== Armenian Cilicia and the Crusades ===
The Kingdom of Cilician Armenia, 1199–1375

During the time of the First Crusade, the area was controlled by the Armenian Kingdom of Cilicia. The Seljuk Turkish invasions of Armenia were followed by an exodus of Armenians migrating westward into the Byzantine Empire, and in 1080 Ruben, a relative of the last king of Ani, founded in the heart of the Cilician Taurus a small principality which gradually expanded into the Armenian Kingdom of Cilicia. This Christian state, surrounded by Muslim states hostile to its existence, had a stormy history of about 300 years, giving valuable support to the Crusaders, and trading with the great commercial cities of Italy.

It prospered for three centuries due to the vast network of fortifications which secured all the major roads as well as the three principal harbours at Ayas, Koŕikos, and Mopsuestia. Through their complex alliances with the Crusader states, the Armenian barons and kings often invited Crusaders to maintain castles in and along the borders of the Kingdom, including Bagras, Trapessac, T‛il Hamtun, Harunia, Selefkia, Amouda, and Sarvandikar.

Gosdantin (r. 1095 – c. 1100) assisted the Crusaders on their march to Antioch, and was created knight and marquis. Thoros I (r. c. 1100 – 1129), in alliance with the Christian princes of Syria, waged successful wars against the Byzantines and Seljuk Turks. Levon II (Leo the Great (r. 1187–1219)), extended the kingdom beyond Mount Taurus and established the capital at Sis. He assisted the Crusaders, was crowned King by the Archbishop of Mainz, and married one of the Lusignans of the Crusader Kingdom of Cyprus.

==== Mongols ====
Hetoum I (r. 1226–1270) made an alliance with the Mongols, sending his brother Sempad to the Mongol court in person. The Mongols then assisted with the defence of Cilicia from the Mamluks of Egypt, until the Mongols themselves converted to Islam.

==== Turkmens ====
The Ilkhanate lost cohesion after the death of Abu Sa'id (r. 1316–1335), and thus could not support the Armenian Kingdom in guarding Cilicia. Internal conflicts within the Armenian Kingdom and the devastation caused by the Black Death that arrived in 1348, led nomadic Türkmens to turn their eyes towards unstable Cilicia. In 1352, Ramazan Beg led Turkmens settled south of Çaldağı and founded their first settlement, Camili. Later that year, Ramazan Beg visited Cairo and was licensed by the Sultan to establish the new frontier Turkmen Emirate in Cilicia.

Yüreğir Türkmens lived as a small community for 7 years in southeast of Adana, and named their new land, Yüreğir.

==== Collapse ====
When Levon V died (1342), John of Lusignan was crowned king as Gosdantin IV; but he and his successors alienated the native Armenians by attempting to make them conform to the Roman Church, and by giving all posts of honour to Latins, until at last the kingdom, falling prey to internal dissensions, ceded Cilicia Pedias to the Ramadanid-supported Mamluk Sultanate of Egypt in 1375.

=== Mamluk and Turkmen rule ===
During the Ramadanid era, Cilicia was a buffer state between two Islamic powers.

In 1359, Mamluk Sultanate Army marched into Cilicia and took over Adana and Tarsus, two major cities of the plain, leaving few castles to Armenians. In 1375, Mamluks gained the control of the remaining areas of Cilicia, thus ending the three centuries rule of Armenians. Cilicia Pedias became part of the Mamluk Sultanate in 1375. Mamluk Sultanate authorized Ramazan Beg led Türkmen Emirate to administer Cilicia, but took direct control of the towns, Tarsus, Ayas, Sarvandikar, Sis at the four corners of Cilicia plain and appointed an Amir and a Garrison for each. Tarsus, the former capital of Cilicia, were settled by the moors that arrived from Egypt. Türkmen Emirate which began to be known as Ramadanids, set the city of Adana as their center of power, and many Türkmen families of Yüreğir origin moved to the city.

After the death of Ramazan Bey, his son Ibrahim Bey made alliance with the Karaman Emirate. Alaeddin Bey and Ibrahim Bey together tried to break the Mameluks' might in the province. After this alliance a great Mameluk army moved in and began to plunder but Ibrahim Bey's army achieved a great victory against the Mameluks in Belen. Also in this battle Temur Bey, the general of the Mameluks, had been captured. Yilboga, the amir of Aleppo moved on to the Turkmens after this defeat and he conquered Misis Castle.

Ramadanids were the only emirate in Anatolia that were not a successor of the Anatolian Seljuk Sultanate. They are often misclassified as an Anatolian beylik, though they were an entity under Mamluks. The Ramadanids played an important role in 15th century Ottoman-Mamluk relations, being a buffer state located in the Mamluk al-'Awasim frontier zone. Cilicia were one of the last regions of Anatolia to fall under Turkish rule, and were part of the Seljuqs for a short time, thus were not effected from Sunni tariqa expansionism of the 13th century. Yüreğir Turks moved to Cilicia in the late 14th century, and had a distinct culture that influenced from Bektashi traditions which accompanied Shamanic rituals with Islam. Living together and having cultural exchange with the large Armenian community, Yüreğir Turks flourished a laid back culture.

The Karamanid Principality, one of the Turkmen Anatolian beyliks emerged after the collapse of the Anatolian Seljuks, took over the rule of Cilicia Thracea.

=== Ottoman period ===
In 1516, Selim I incorporated the beylik into the Ottoman Empire after his conquest of the Mamluk state. The beys of Ramadanids held the administration of the Ottoman sanjak of Adana in a hereditary manner until 1608, with the area serving as a vassal of the Ottomans.

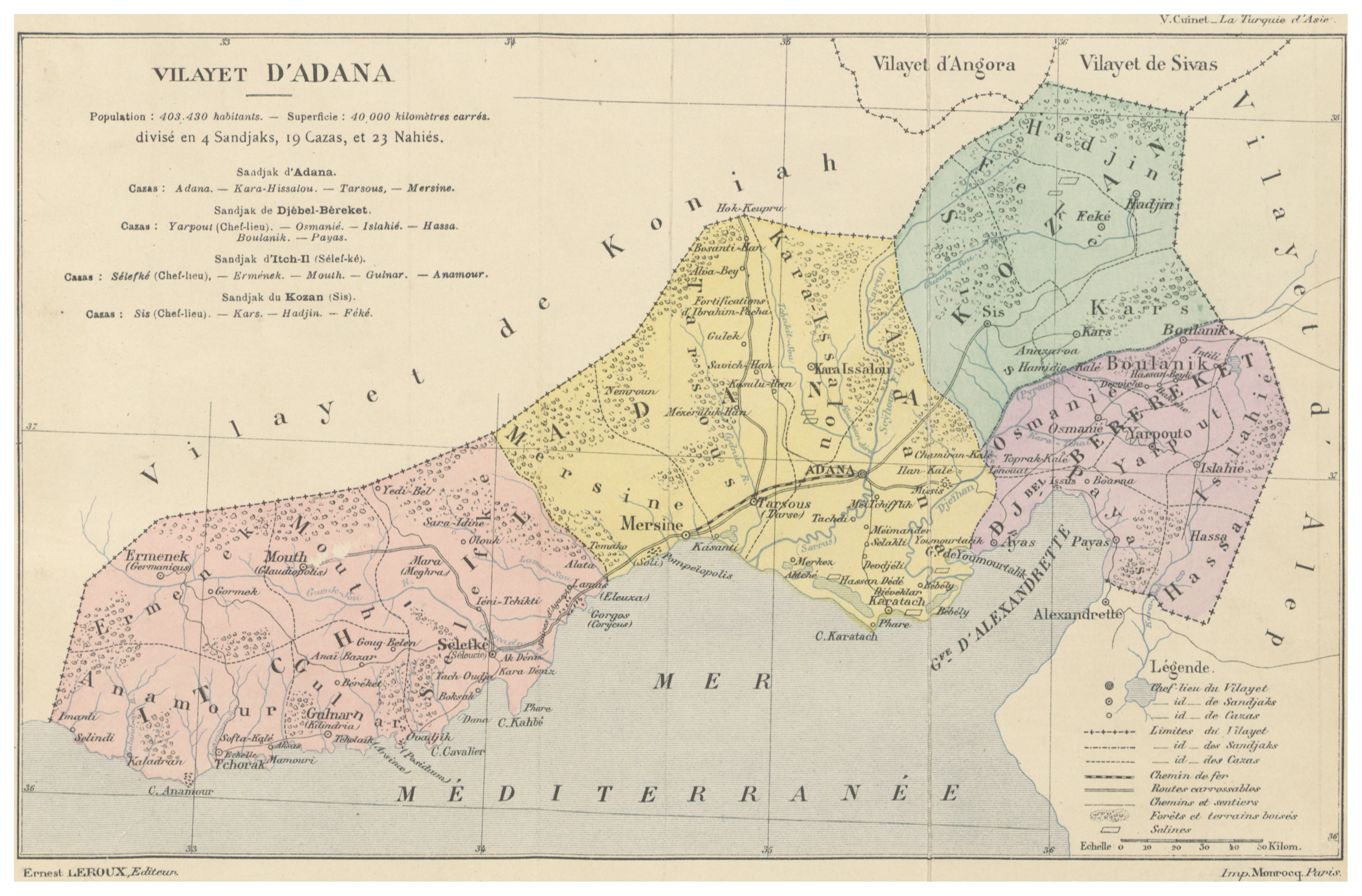
Adana Vilayet in 1892

Ottomans ended the Ramadanid administration of Adana sanjak in 1608, ruling it directly from Constantinople then after. The autonomous sanjak was then split from the Aleppo Eyalet and established as a new province under the name of Adana Eyalet. A governor was appointed to administer the province. In late 1832, Eyalet of Egypt Vali Muhammad Ali Pasha invaded Syria, and reached Cilicia. The Convention of Kütahya that was signed on 14 May 1833, ceded Cilicia to the de facto independent Egypt.

Alawites brought to Cilicia from Syria to work at the flourishing agricultural lands. İbrahim Paşa, the son of Muhammed Ali Paşa, demolished the Adana Castle and the city walls in 1836. He built the canals for irrigation and transportation and also built water systems for the residential areas of the towns. Adana had the infrastructure it needed by the second half of the 19th century to become major center of Southeastern Anatolia.

After the Oriental crisis, the Convention of Alexandria that was signed on 27 November 1840, required the return of Cilicia to Ottoman sovereignty. The American Civil War that broke out in 1861 disturbed the cotton flow to Europe and directed European cotton traders to fertile Cilicia. The region became the centre of cotton trade and one of the most economically strong regions of the Empire within decades. In 1869, Adana Eyalet was re-established as Adana Vilayet, after the re-structuring in the Ottoman Administration. Adana–Mersin railway line was opened in 1886, connecting Cilicia to international ports through Port of Mersin.

A thriving regional economy, the doubling of Cilician Armenian population due to flight from the Hamidian massacres, and the end of autocratic Abdulhamid rule with the revolution of 1908, empowered the Armenian community and envisioned an autonomous Cilicia. Enraged supporters of Abdulhamid that organized under Cemiyet-i Muhammediye amidst the countercoup, led to a series of anti-Armenian pogroms in 14–27 April 1909. The Adana massacre resulted in the deaths of roughly 25,000 Armenians, orphaned 3500 children and caused heavy destruction of Christian neighbourhoods in the entire Vilayet.

The Cilicia section of the Berlin–Baghdad railway was opened in 1912, connecting the region to the Middle East. Over the course of the Armenian genocide, an Ottoman telegraph was received by the Governor to deport the more than 70,000 Armenians of the Adana Vilayet to Syria. Armenians of Zeitun had organized a successful resistance against the Ottoman onslaught. In order to finally subjugate Zeitun, the Ottomans had to resort to treachery by forcing an Armenian delegation from Marash to ask the Zeituntsis to put down their arms. Both the Armenian delegation, and later, the inhabitants of Zeitun, were left with no choice.

=== Modern era ===
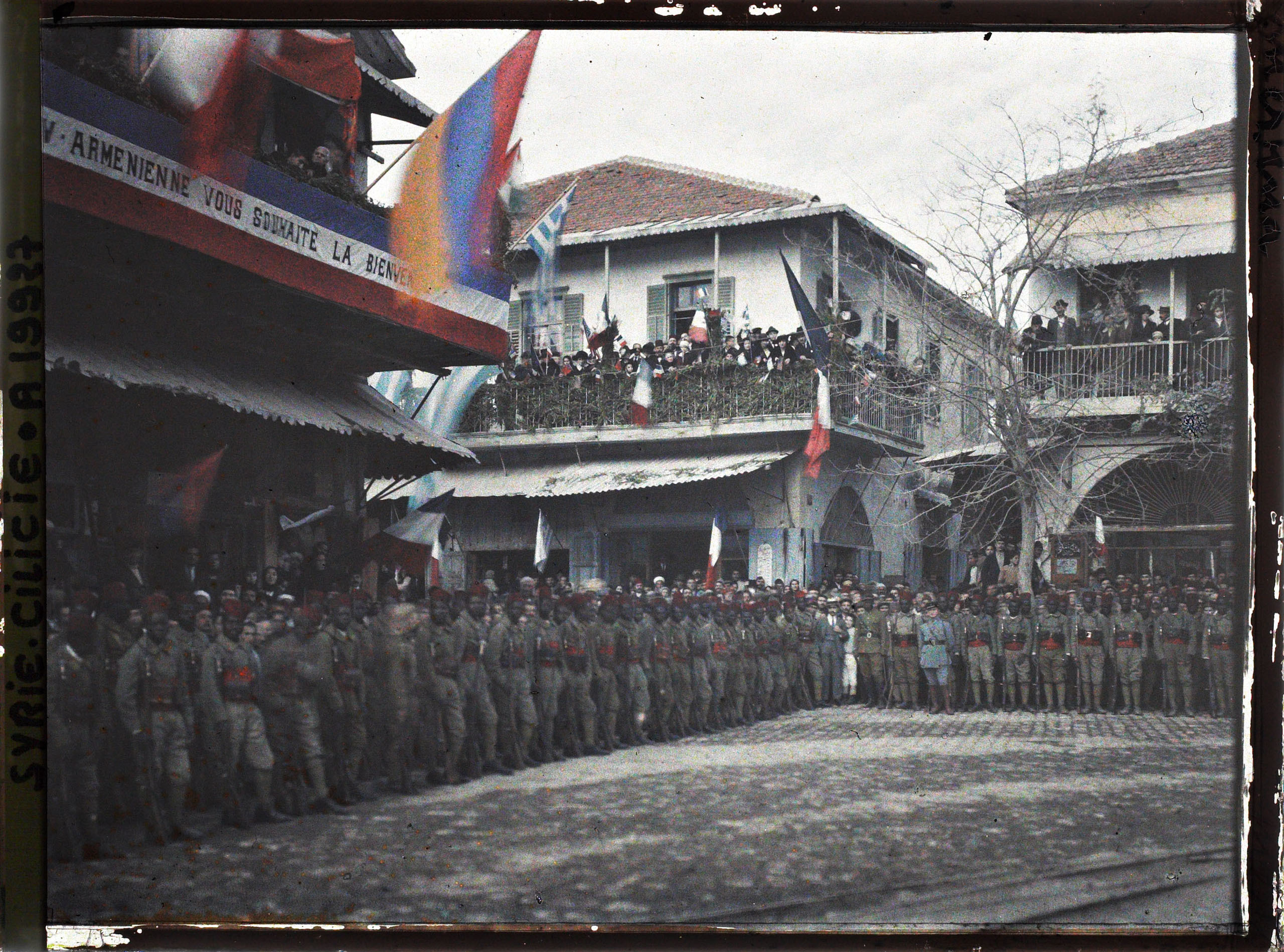
French taking over Cilicia as General Gouraud arrives Mersin

Armistice of Mudros that was signed on 30 October 1918 to end the World War I, ceded the control of Cilicia to France. French Government sent four battalions of the Armenian Legion in December to take over and oversee the repatriation of more than 170,000 Armenians to Cilicia. Returning Armenians negotiated with France to establish an autonomous State of Cilicia. The Armenians formed the Armenian National Union which acted as an unofficial Cilician Armenian government composed of the four major political parties and three Armenian religious denominations. Mihran Damadian, the chief negotiator for Armenians, signed the provisional Constitution of Cilicia in 1919 to bring new order to the region.

The French forces were spread too thinly in the region and, as they came under withering attacks by Muslim elements both opposed and loyal to Mustafa Kemal Pasha, eventually reversed their policies in the region. A truce arranged on 28 May between the French and the Kemalists, led to the retreat of the French forces south of the Mersin-Osmaniye railroad.

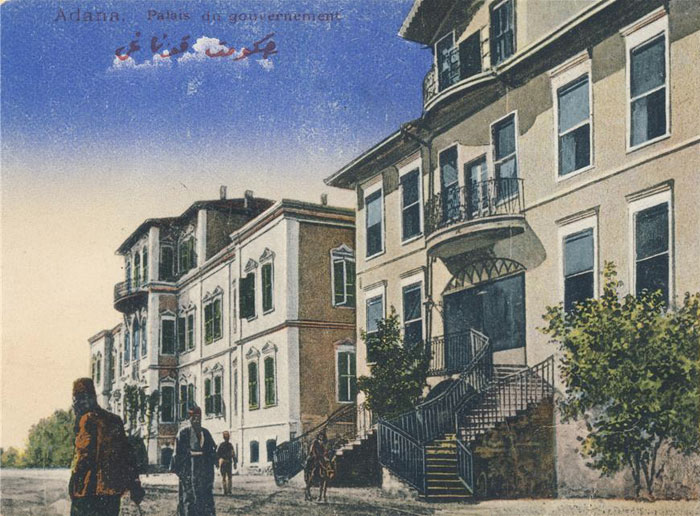
Cilician Government Palace

With the changing political environment and interests, the French further reversed their policy: The repatriation was halted, and the French ultimately abandoned all pretensions to Cilicia, which they had originally hoped to attach to their mandate over Syria. Cilicia Peace Treaty was signed on 9 March 1921 between France and Turkish Grand National Assembly. The treaty did not achieve the intended goals and was replaced with the Treaty of Ankara that was signed on 20 October 1921. Based on the terms of the agreement, France recognized the end of the Cilicia War, and French troops together with the remaining Armenian volunteers withdrew from the region in early January 1922.

Maronite community were re-settled in Lebanon by the French Administration. Later in 1922, roughly 10,000 Greeks were forced to move to Greece by the policy of Greco-Turkish population exchange. Cilicia Armenians settled in Lebanon, at the newly founded Armenian Bourj Hammoud town, just north-east of Beirut. From the 1920s, around 60 percent of the Cilician Armenians moved to Argentina. An informal census of 1941 revealed that, 70 percent of all the Armenian Argentines in Buenos Aires had Adana origins.

=== Republic of Turkey ===
The region become part of the Republic of Turkey in 1921 with the signing of the Treaty of Ankara. On 15 April 1923, just before the signing of the Treaty of Lausanne, the Turkish government enacted the "Law of Abandoned Properties" which confiscated properties of Armenians and Greeks who were not present on their property. Cilicia were one of the regions with the most confiscated property, thus muhacirs (en: immigrants) from Balkans and Crete were relocated in the old Armenian and Greek neighbourhoods and villages of the region. All types of properties, lands, houses and workshops were distributed to them. Also during this period, there was a property rush of Muslims from Kayseri and Darende to Cilicia who were granted the ownership of large farms, factories, stores and mansions. Within a decade, Cilicia had a sharp change demographically, socially and economically and lost its diversity by turning into solely Muslim/Turkish.

Remaining Jews and Christians were hit by the heavy burden of the Wealth Tax in 1942, which caused them to leave Cilicia, selling their properties for peanuts to families like Sabancı, who built their wealth on owning confiscated or cheaply purchased properties. Forcible change in means of production led to abuse of wealth and harsh treatment of labor later in the 20th century, as the new possessors did not have the necessary management attributes that the previous owners had for centuries.

=== Legacy ===
According to one Greek myth, Cilicia was named after Cilix (Ancient Greek: Κίλιξ, romanized: Kílix), a Phoenician who went to live there after searching for his sister Europa following the instructions of his father, the king Agenor of Tyre or Sidon.

In another Greek myth, the name of Cilicia was derived from a people named the Kilikes (Κίλικες), who were Greeks who originally lived in the Troad, and who settled the coastland of Cilicia under the leadership of the seer Mopsus. The Karatepe Luwian-Phoenician bilingual inscription mentions the House of Mopsus (Hieroglyphic Luwian: 𔑾𔗧𔗔𔗔, romanized: Muksas; Phoenician: 𐤌𐤐𐤔, romanized: mpš) as the reigning dynasty of the kingdom of Ḫiyawa.

== Society and culture ==
=== Ancient ===
==== Ethnicity ====
The inhabitants of Ancient Cilicia were Luwians who had settled in this region in the 2nd millennium BC, and Cilicia itself had become an important centre of Luwian settlement in Anatolia in the aftermath of the Late Bronze Age collapse.

This Luwian population persisted in Cilicia in the 1st millennium BC until the later Hellenistic and Roman periods, hence why the onomastics of this region, especially in its western part (Rough Cilicia), were Luwian in character, implying that it was inhabited by a large number of Luwian speakers until the early 1st millennium AD.

===== Persian influence =====
Like in the rest of the western satrapies of the Achaemenid Empire, Persians had moved in Cilicia, and archaeological evidence such as reliefs from Silifke, Adana and Korykos suggest that a Persian nobility as well as a Persianised nobility existed in Cilicia during the Achaemenid period.

===== Cultural diversity =====
Achaemenid and post-Achaemenid Cilicia was culturally very diverse, as attested by:

- Aramaic funerary inscriptions and an Aramaic foundation text at Meydancık;
- coins minted at Soli and Tarsus of Persian, modified Persian, and non-Persian types;
- Greek and Aramaic inscriptions.

==== Social organisation ====
The population of the eastern part of ancient Cilicia was urbanised and participated in commercial and industrial activities, while the inhabitants of its western regions were tribally organised and led simpler lifestyles.

=== Modern ===
Significant Christian communities (Antiochian Greek Christians and Armenians) are found in Adana, İskenderun, and Mersin.

=== Administrative structure ===
==== Ancient ====
Temple estates had existed in Cilicia since the pre-Achaemenid period, although the best documentation regarding them is from the Hellenestic period. Known temple estates include the temple of Zeus at Olbē and the temple of Artemis Perasia at Kastabala.

==== Achaemenid ====
Like the other western satrapies of the Achaemenid Empire, the satrap of Cilicia owned an estate with a palace at Tarsus, which was a large and thriving city during the Achaemenid period. Subordinate to the satrap in the local administration were lower rank officials, with some of them being landed aristocrats owning estates and villages, and others being priests in the sanctuaries of Cilicia who administered the temple estates, as well as other even lesser officials.

The temple estates persisted through the Achaemenid period, implying that their existence was not perceived as detrimental to the authority of the satrap of Cilicia.

The duties of the satrap including maintaining peace within his satrapy to ensure agriculture could be conducted and tribute could be produced, as well as to keep the locations at higher altitudes and the mountain passes under control loyal to the Achaemenid crown, to which it contributed 360 horses and 140 talents of silver for defence.

Cilicia also provided troops to the land and maritime military forces of the Achaemenid Empire, and the satrapy itself acted as an assembly point for them.

Little is known of the large cities in the Achaemenid period, although Tarsus and Soli are known to have minted coins which were used in the Achaemenid military campaigns against Cyprus and Egypt.

During the Achaemenid period, the administration of Cilicia was stable and efficient, thanks to which it was agriculturally very productive and was capable of holding large military concentrations. The fact that the king of kings Darius I expected 500 talents of silver as tribute from Cilicia attests that its administration was of the necessary competence to generate a revenue that was more than trivial.

==== Hellenistic ====
In the Hellenistic period, the Cilician temple estates adopted Greek culture under the influence of Seleucid administration:

- the high priests of Zeus at Olbe were able to expand their authority after the fall of the Achaemend Empire, and they became culturally Hellenised, with their dynasts shifting their names from Tarkuaris (Ταρκυαρις, from Luwian Tarḫuwarris) to Teukros (Τευκρος);
- the chief priest of the temple of Artemis Perasia at Castabala was also a dynast who became culturally Hellenised.

==== Modern ====
Modern Cilicia is split into four administrative provinces: Mersin, Adana, Osmaniye and Hatay. Each province is governed by the Central Government in Ankara through an appointed Provincial governor. Provinces are then divided into districts governed by the District Governors who are under the provincial governors.

Province	Seat	Area (km^{2})	Districts (West to East)	Population	Map
Mersin	Mersin	15,853	Anamur, Bozyazı, Aydıncık (Kelenderis), Gülnar, Mut, Silifke, Erdemli, Mezitli, Yenişehir Toroslar, Akdeniz, Çamlıyayla (Namrun), Tarsus	1,891,145	
Adana	Adana	14,030	Seyhan, Çukurova, Yüreğir, Sarıçam, Pozantı, Karaisalı, Karataş, Yumurtalık (Ayas), Ceyhan, İmamoğlu, Aladağ (Karsantı), Kozan(Sis), Feke (Vahka), Saimbeyli (Hadjin), Tufanbeyli	2,263,373	
Osmaniye	Osmaniye	3,767	Sumbas, Kadirli (Karsbazar), Toprakkale (Tall Hamdūn), Düziçi, Osmaniye, Hasanbeyli, Bahçe	553,012	
Hatay	Antakya	5,524	Erzin, Dörtyol (Chork Marzban), Hassa, İskenderun, Arsuz, Belen, Kırıkhan, Samandağ(Süveydiye), Antakya, Defne, Reyhanlı, Kumlu, Yayladağı, Altınözü	1,670,712	

=== Religion ===
==== Ancient ====
Reflecting the diversity of Cilicia in the Achaemenid and post-Achaemenid periods, various deities of different origins have been attested there in antiquity:

- an Aramaic funerary inscription from Kesecek Köyü to the north-east of Tarsus was accompanied by depictions of Semitic deities;
- one Cilician coin depicted Baal of Tarsus with an Achaemenid winged disk;
- another Cilician coin depicted the Semitic god Nergal wearing Persian clothes, possibly resulting from an identification of him with Mithra.

As a result of the strong impact of 200 years of rule by the Persian Achaemenid Empire, fire altars and magi were still present at Tarsus and in the rest of Cilicia in the c. 260s AD, as recorded by the Sasanian high priest Kartir.

== Demographics ==
Cilicia is heavily populated due to its abundant resources, climate and plain geography. The population of Cilicia as of 31 December 2022 is 6,435,986.

Hatay is the most rural province of Cilicia and also Hatay is the only province that the rural population is rising and the urban population is declining. The major reason is the mountainous geography of Hatay.

Adana Province is the most urbanized province, with most of the population centred in the city of Adana. Mersin Province has a larger rural population than Adana Province, owing to its long and narrow stretch of flat land in between the Taurus Mountains and the Mediterranean.

== Economy ==
Cilicia is well known for the vast fertile land and highly productive agriculture. The region is also industrialized; Tarsus, Adana and Ceyhan host numerous plants. Mersin and İskenderun seaports provide transportation of goods manufactured in Central, South and Southeast Anatolia. Ceyhan hosts oil, natural gas terminals as well as refineries and shipbuilders.

=== Natural resources ===
==== Agriculture ====
The Cilicia plain has some of the most fertile soil in the world in which 3 harvests can be taken each year. The region has the second richest flora in the world and it is the producer of all agricultural products of Turkey except hazelnut and tobacco. Cilicia leads Turkey in soy, peanuts and corn harvest and is a major producer of fruits and vegetables. Half of Turkey's citrus export is from Cilicia. Anamur is the only sub-tropical area of Turkey where bananas, mango, kiwi and other sub-tropical produce can be harvested.

Cilicia is the second largest honey producer in Turkey after the Muğla–Aydın region. Samandağ, Yumurtalık, Karataş and Bozyazı are some of the towns in the region where fishing is the major source of income. Gray mullet, red mullet, sea bass, lagos, calamari and gilt-head bream are some of the most popular fish in the region. There are aquaculture farms in Akyatan, Akyağan, Yumurtalık lakes and at Seyhan Reservoir. While not as common as other forms of agriculture, dairy and livestock are also produced throughout the region.

==== Mining ====
- Zinc and lead: Kozan-Horzum seam is the major source.
- Chrome is found around Aladağlar.
- Baryte resources are around Mersin and Adana.
- Iron is found around Feke and Saimbeyli.
- Asbestos mines are mostly in Hatay Province.
- Limestone reserves are very rich in Cilicia. The region is home to four lime manufacturing plants.
- Pumice resources are the richest in Turkey. 14% of country's reserves are in Cilicia.

=== Manufacturing ===
Cilicia is one of the first industrialized regions of Turkey. With the improvements in agriculture and the spike of agricultural yield, agriculture-based industries are built in large numbers. Today, the manufacturing industry is mainly concentrated around Tarsus, Adana and Ceyhan. Textile, leather tanning and food processing plants are plentiful. İsdemir is a large steel plant located in İskenderun.

The petrochemical industry is rapidly developing in the region with the investments around the Ceyhan Oil Terminal. Petroleum refineries are being built in the area. Ceyhan is also expected to host the shipbuilding industry.

=== Commerce ===
Adana is the commercial centre of the region where many of the public and private institutions have their regional offices. Mersin and Antakya are also home to regional offices of public institutions. Many industry fairs and congresses are held in the region at venues such as the TÜYAP Congress and Exhibition Centre in Adana and the Mersin Congress Centre.

Mersin Seaport is the third largest seaport in Turkey, after Istanbul and İzmir. There are 45 piers in the port. The total area of the port is 785 square kilometres (194,000 acres), and the capacity is 6,000 ships per year.

İskenderun Seaport is used mostly for transfers to Middle East and Southeastern Turkey.

Ceyhan Oil Terminal is a marine transport terminal for the Baku–Tbilisi–Ceyhan pipeline (the "BTC"), the Kirkuk–Ceyhan Oil Pipeline, the planned Samsun-Ceyhan and the Ceyhan-Red Sea pipelines. Ceyhan will also be a natural gas terminal for a planned pipeline to be constructed parallel to the Kirkuk-Ceyhan oil pipeline, and for a planned extension of the Blue Stream Gas Pipeline from Samsun to Ceyhan.

Dörtyol Oil Terminal is a marine transport terminal for Batman-Dörtyol oil pipeline which started operating in 1967 to market Batman oil. The pipeline is 511 km long and has an annual capacity of 3.5 million tons.

=== Tourism ===
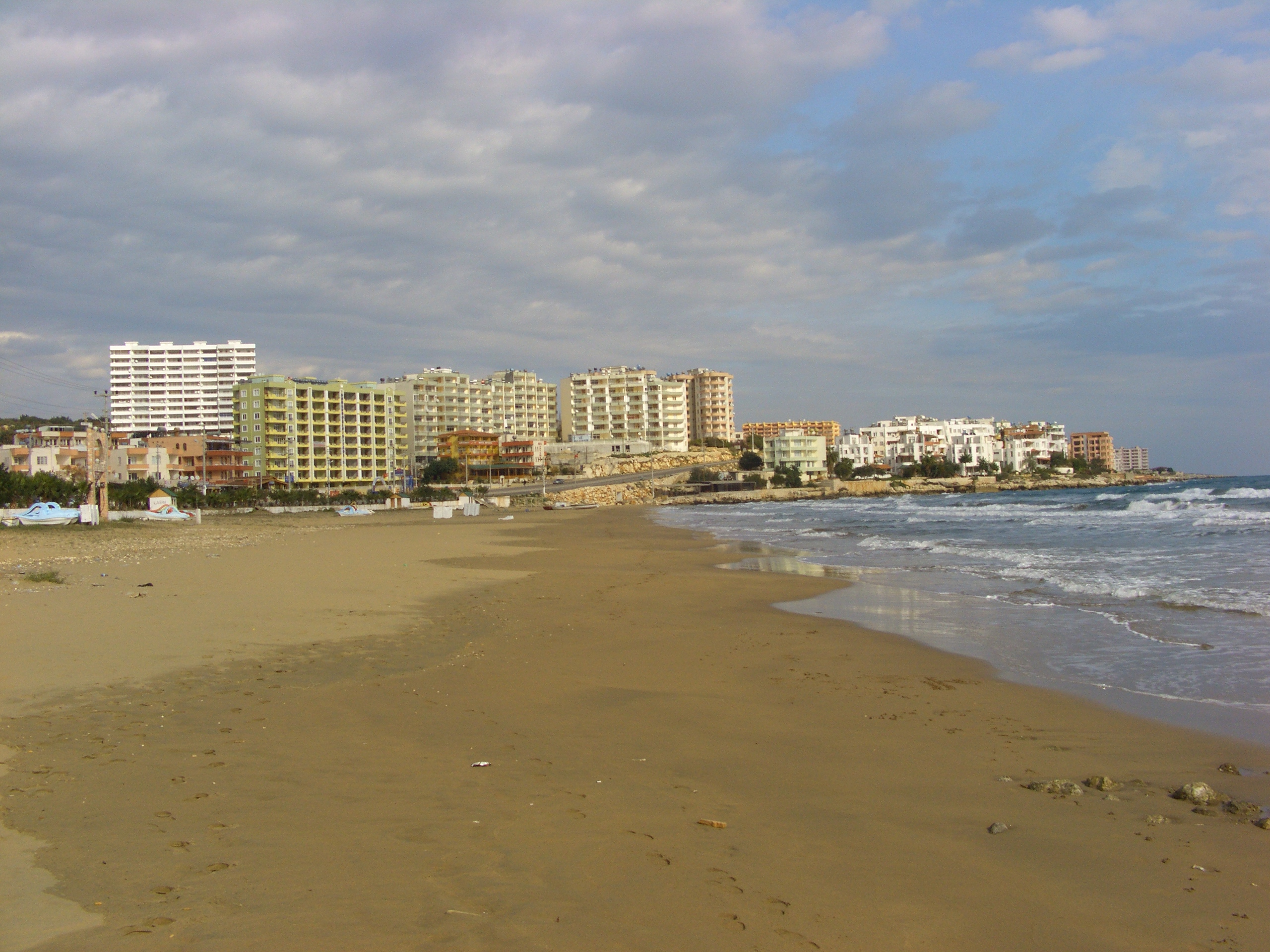
Yemiskumu Beach (Ayaş, Erdemli district of Mersin Province)

While the region has a long coastline, international tourism is not at the level of the neighbouring Antalya Province. There are a small number of hotels between Erdemli and Anamur that attracts tourists. Cilicia tourism is mostly cottage tourism serving the Cilicia locals as well as residents of Kayseri, Gaziantep and surrounding areas. Between Silifke and Mersin, high-rise and low-rise cottages line the coast, leaving almost no vacant land. The coastline from Mersin to Karataş is mostly farmland. This area is zoned for resort tourism and is expected to have a rapid development within the next 20 years. Karataş and Yumurtalık coasts are home to cottages with a bird conservatory between the two areas. Arsuz is a seaside resort that is mostly frequented by Antakya and İskenderun residents.

Plateaus on the Taurus mountains are cooler escapes for the locals who wants to chill out from hot and humid summers of the lower plains. Gözne and Çamlıyayla (Namrun) in Mersin Province, Tekir, Bürücek and Kızıldağ in Adana Province, Zorkun in Osmaniye Province and Soğukoluk in Hatay Province are the popular high plain resorts of Cilicia which are often crowded in summer. There are a few hotels and camping sites in the Tekir plateau.

==== Balneary tourism ====
The region is a popular destination for thermal springs. Hamamat Thermal Spring, located on midway from Kırıkhan to Reyhanlı, has a very high sulphur ratio, making it the second in the world after a thermal spring in India. It is the largest spa in the region and attracts many Syrians due to proximity. Haruniye Thermal Spring is located on the banks of the Ceyhan River near Düziçi town and has a serene environment. Thermal springs are a hot spot for people with rheumatism. Kurttepe, Alihocalı and Ilıca mineral springs, all located in Adana Province, are popular for toxic cleansing. Ottoman Palace Thermal Resort & Spa in Antakya is one of Turkey's top resorts for revitalization.

==== Religious tourism ====
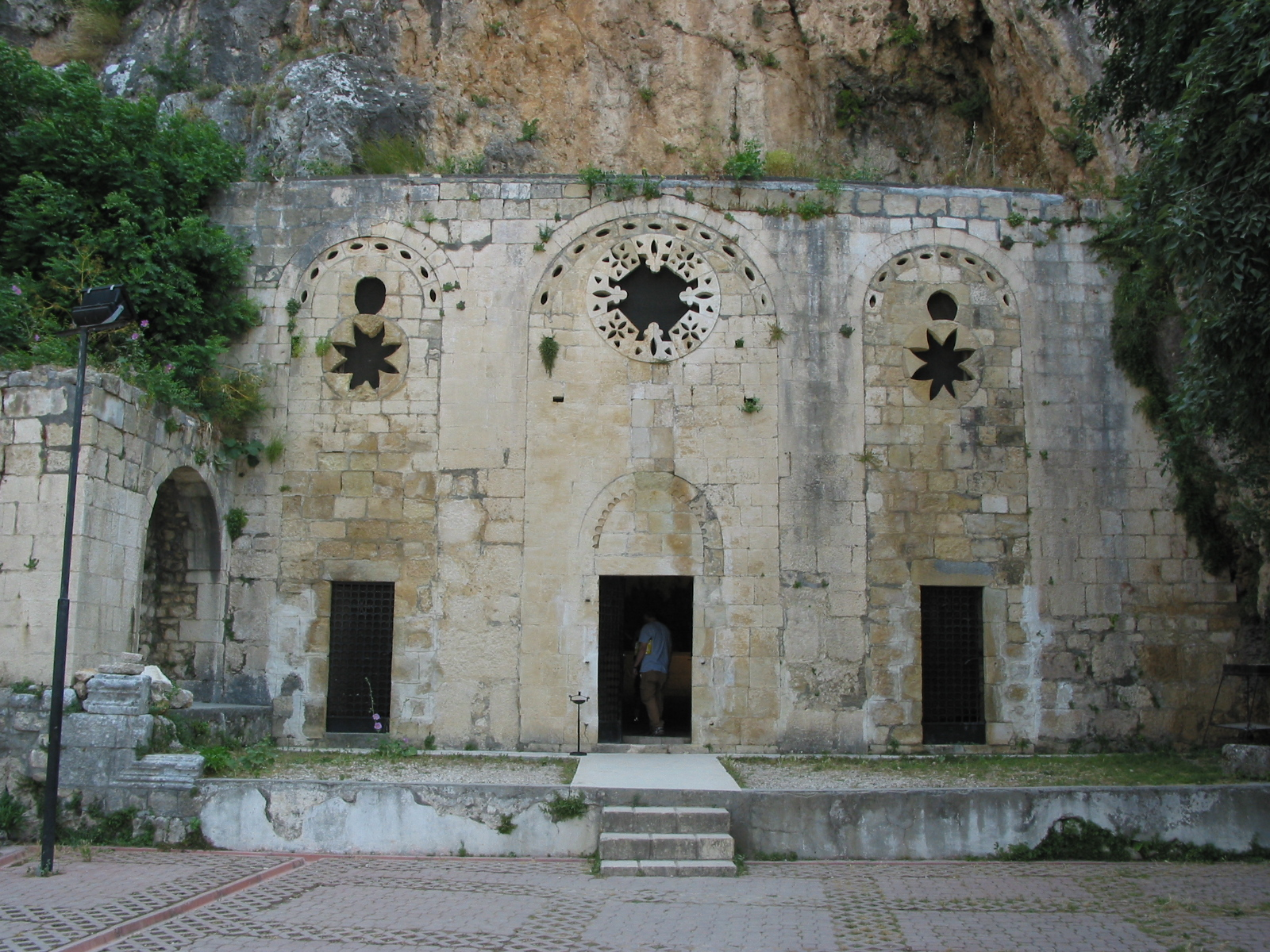
Church of Saint Peter near Antakya

Lying at a crossroads of three major religions, namely Judaism, Christianity and Islam, the region is home to numerous landmarks that are important for people of faith. Tarsus is the birthplace of Paul the Apostle, who returned to the city after his conversion. The city was a stronghold of Christians after his death. Ashab-ı Kehf cavern, one of the locations claimed to be the resting place of the legendary Seven Sleepers, holy to Christians and Muslims, is located north of Tarsus.

Antakya is another destination for the spiritual world, where, according to the New Testament the followers of Jesus Christ were first called Christians. the Church of Saint Peter near Antakya (Antioch) is one of Christianity's oldest churches. It is the home of Saint Peter, one of the 12 apostles of Jesus. Antioch was called "the cradle of Christianity" as a result of its longevity and the pivotal role that it played in the emergence of both Hellenistic Judaism and early Christianity,

== Places of interest ==
=== Ancient sites ===
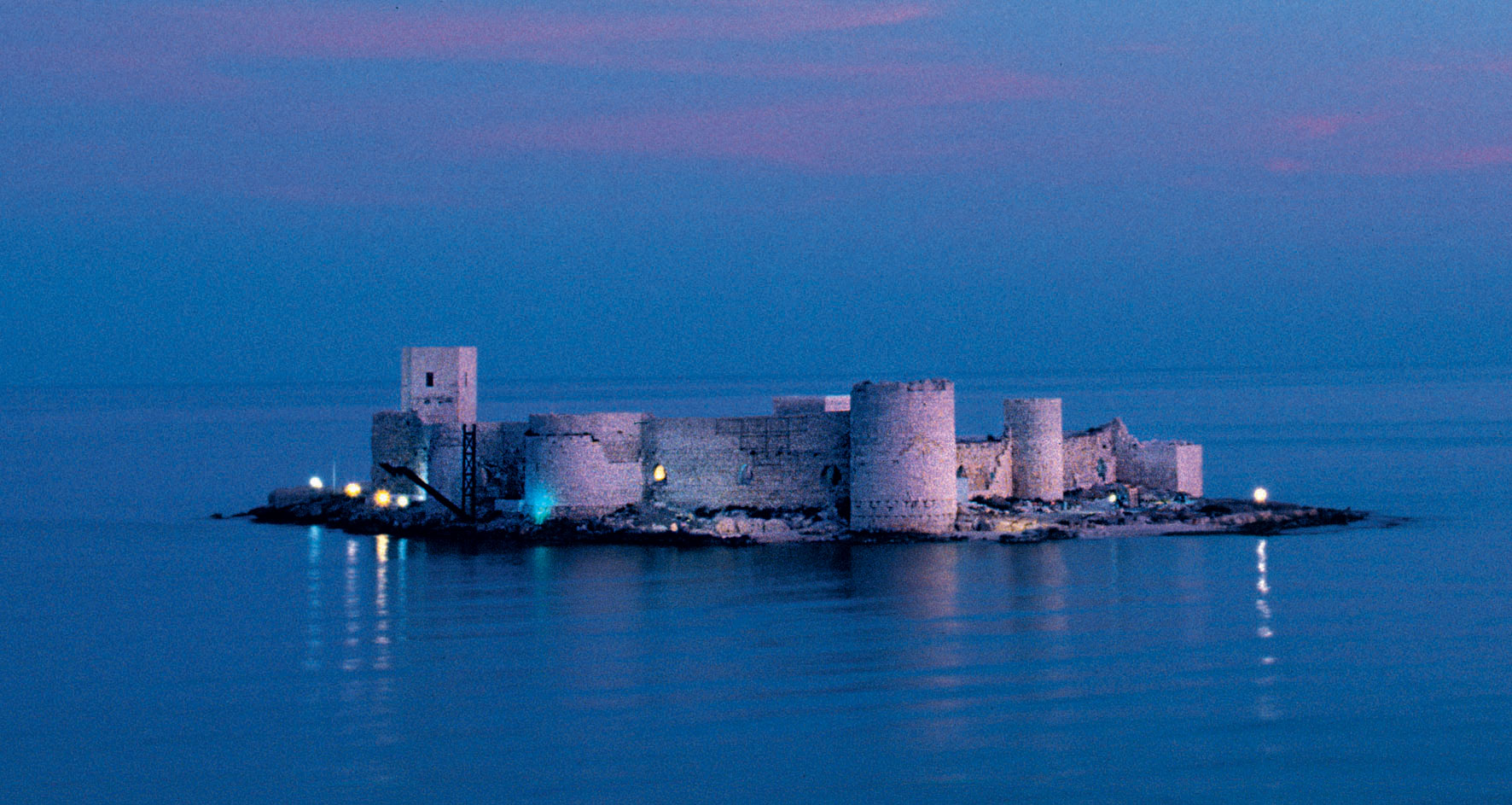
Kızkalesi (Korykos)

Kizkalesi (Maiden Castle), a fort on a small island across Kızkalesi township, was built during the early 12th century by Armenian kings of the Rubeniyan dynasty to defend the city of Korykos (present-day Kızkalesi).

Heaven & Hell, situated on a large hill north of Narlıkuyu, consists of the grabens resulting from assoil of furrings for thousands of years. The natural phenomenon of the grabens is named 'Hell & Heaven' because of the exotic effects on people. Visitors can access the cave of the mythological giant Typhon.

The ancient Roman town of Soloi-Pompeiopolis, near the city of Mersin.

Yılanlı Kale (Castle of Serpents), an 11th-century Crusader castle built on a historical road connecting the Taurus mountains with the city of Antakya. The castle has 8 round towers, a military guardhouse and a church. It is located 5 km. west of Ceyhan.

Anazarbus Castle, built in the 3rd century, served as the centre of the ancient metropolis of Anavarza. The city was built on a hill and had strategic importance, controlling the Cilician plain. The main castle and the city walls represent remains of the city. The city wall is 1500 m. long and 8-10m. high, with 4 entrances to the city. The castle is located 80 km. northeast of Adana.

Şar (Comona), an ancient city located in northernmost Cilicia, some 200 km. north of Adana, near Tufanbeyli. It was an historical centre of the Hittites. Remaining structures today include the amphitheatre built during the Roman period, ruins of a church from the Byzantine era and Hittite rock-works.

The Church of St. Peter in Antakya was a cave on the slopes of Habibi Neccar mountain converted into a church. The church is known as the first Christians' traditional meeting place. Pope Paul VI declared the church a "Place of Pilgrimage" for Christians in 1963, and since then a special ceremony takes place on 29 June each year.

St. Simeon Monastery, a 6th-century giant structure built on a desolate hill 18 km south of Antakya. The most striking features of this monastery are its cisterns, its storage compartment, and the walls. It is believed that St. Simeon resided here atop a 20-meter stone column for 45 years.

=== Parks and conservation areas ===
Akyatan Lagoon is a large wildlife refuge which acts as a stopover for migratory birds voyaging from Africa to Europe. The wildlife refuge has a 14,700 ha (36,000-acre) area made up of forests, lagoon, marsh, sandy and reedy lands. Akyatan lake is a natural wonder with endemic plants and endangered bird species living in it together with other species of plants and animals. 250 species of birds are observed during a study in 1990. The conservation area is located 30 km south of Adana, near Tuzla.

Yumurtalık Nature Reserve covers an area of 16,430 hectares within the Seyhan-Ceyhan delta, with its lakes, lagoons and wide collection of plant and animal species. The area is an important location for many species of migrating birds, the number gets higher during the winters when the lakes become a shelter when other lakes further north freeze.

Aladağlar National Park, located north of Adana, is a huge park of around 55,000 hectares, the summit of Demirkazik at 3756 m is the highest point in the middle Taurus mountain range. There is a huge range of flora and fauna, and visitors may fish in the streams full of trout. Wildlife includes wild goats, bears, lynx and sable. The most common species of plant life is black pine and cluster pine trees, with some cedar dotted between, and fir trees in the northern areas with higher humidity. The Alpine region, from the upper borders of the forest, has pastures with rocky areas and little variety of plant life because of the high altitude and slope.

Karatepe-Aslantaş National Park located on the west bank of Ceyhan River in Osmaniye Province. The park includes the Karatepe Hittite fortress and an open-air museum.

Tekköz-Kengerlidüz Nature Reserve, located 30 km north of Dörtyol, is known for having an ecosystem different from the Mediterranean. The main species of trees around Kengerliduz are beech, oak and fir, and around Tekkoz are hornbeam, ash, beach, black pine and silver birch. The main animal species in the area are wild goat, roe deer, bear, hyena, wild cat, wagtail, wolf, jackal and fox.

Habibi Neccar Dağı Nature Reserve is famous for its cultural as well as natural value, especially for St Pierre Church, which was carved into the rocks. The Charon monument, 200 m north of the church, is huge sculpture of Haron, known as Boatman of Hell in mythology, carved into the rocks. The main species of tree are cluster pine, oaks and sandalwood. The mountain is also home to foxes, rabbits, partridges and stock doves. Nature reserve is 10 km east of Antakya and can be accessible by public transport.

== Education ==
There are numerous private primary and high schools besides the state schools in the region. Most popular high school in the region is Tarsus American College, founded as a missionary school in 1888 to serve Armenian community and then became a secular school in 1923. Adana Anatolian High School and Adana Science High School most important high schools in the Cilicia. In other cities, Anatolian High School and School for Science are the most popular high schools of the city.

The region is home to five state and two foundation universities.

Çukurova University is a state university founded in 1973 with the union of the faculties of Agriculture and Medicine.. Main campus is in the city of Adana, and the College of Tourism Administration is in Karataş. There is an engineering faculty in Ceyhan, and vocational schools in Kozan, Karaisalı, Pozantı and Yumurtalık. The university is one of the well-developed universities of Turkey with many cultural, social and athletic facilities, currently enrolls 40,000 students.

Mersin University is a state university founded in 1992, and currently serving with 11 faculties, 6 colleges and 9 vocational schools. The university employs more than 2100 academicians and enrolls 26,980 students. Main campus is in the city of Mersin. In Tarsus, there is Faculty of Technical Education and Applied Technology and Management College. In Silifke and Erdemli, university has colleges and vocational schools. There are also vocational schools in Anamur, Aydıncık, Gülnar, and Mut.

Mustafa Kemal University is a state university located in Hatay Province. University was founded in 1992, currently has 9 faculties, 4 colleges and 7 vocational schools. Main campus is in Antakya and Faculty of Engineering is in İskenderun. The university employs 708 academicians and 14,439 students as of 2007.

Korkut Ata University was founded in 2007 as a state university with the union of colleges and vocational schools in Osmaniye Province and began enrollment in 2009. The university has 3 faculties and a vocational school at the main campus in the city of Osmaniye and vocational schools in Kadirli, Bahçe, Düziçi and Erzin. University employs 107 academicians and enrolled 4000 students in 2009.

Adana Science and Technology University is a recently founded state university that is planned to have ten faculties, two institutions and a college. It will accommodate 1,700 academic, 470 administrative staff, and it is expected to enroll students by 2012.

Çağ University is a not-for-profit tuition based university founded in 1997. It is located on midway from Adana to Tarsus. University holds around 2500 students, most of them commuting from Adana, Tarsus and Mersin.

Toros University is a not-for-profit tuition based university located in Mersin. The university started enrolling students in 2010.

== Sports ==
Football is the most popular sport in Cilicia, professionally represented at all levels of the Football in Turkey.

Football Clubs in Cilicia

Club	Sport	League	Venue (capacity)	Founded
Adana Demirspor	Football (men)	Süper Lig	New Adana Stadium (33,543)	1940
Hatayspor	Football (men)	Süper Lig	New Hatay Stadium (25000)	1967
Adanaspor	Football (men)	TFF First League	New Adana Stadium (33,543)	1954
İskenderun FK	Football (men)	TFF Second League	5 Temmuz (8217)	1978
Yeni Mersin İdman Yurdu	Football (men)	TFF Second League	Mersin Arena (25000)	2019
Adana 01 FK	Football (men)	TFF Second League	Ali Hoşfikirer Stadium (2544)	2019
Osmaniyespor	Football (men)	TFF Third League	7 Ocak (6635)	2011
Silifke Belediyespor	Football (men)	TFF Third League	Silifke Şehir (4000)	1964
Adana İdman Yurdu	Football (women)	Women's Super League	Muharrem Gülergin	1993

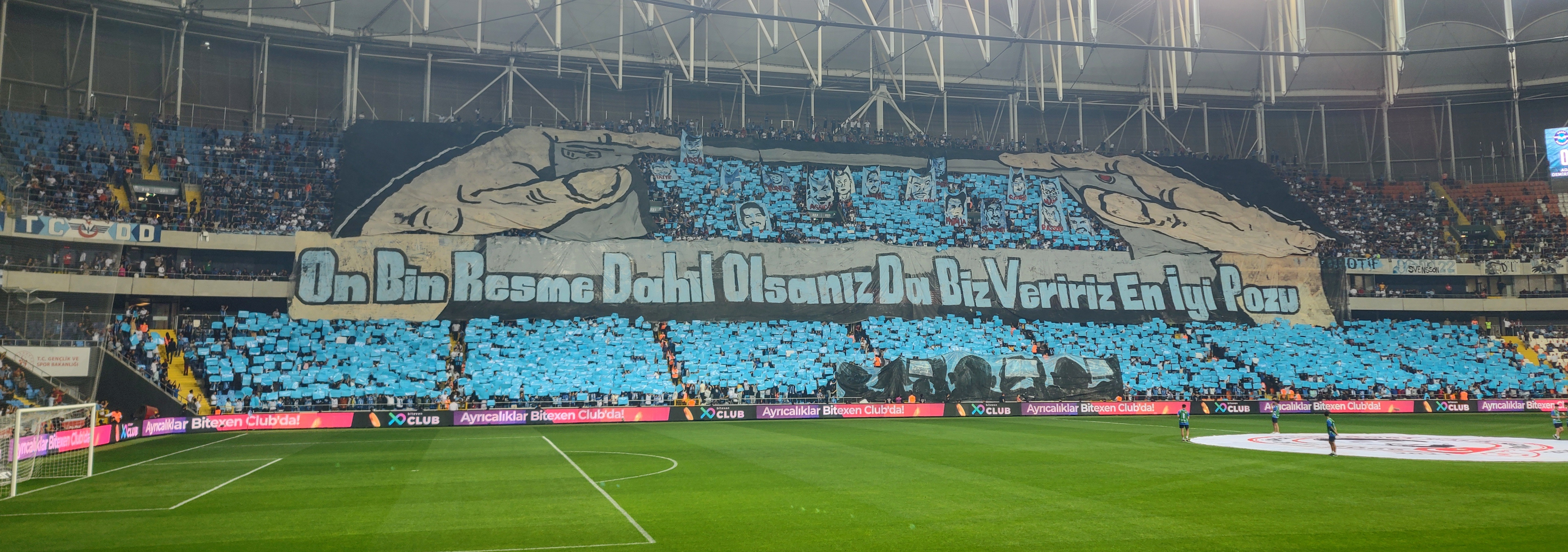
Adana Demirspor are the most popular club of Cilicia
Basketball Clubs in Cilicia

Club	Sport	League	Venue (capacity)	Founded
Mersin BŞB	Basketball (women)	Women's Super League	Edip Buran Arena (1750)	1993
Hatay BŞB	Basketball (women)	Women's Super League	Antakya Sport Hall (2500)	2009
Adana Basketbol Kulubü	Basketball (women)	Women's Super League	Adana Atatürk Sports Hall (2000)	2000
Mersin Basketbol Kulübü	Basketball (women)	Women's Super League	Edip Buran Arena (1750)	
Tosyalı Toyo Osmaniye	Basketball (women)	Women's Super League	Tosyalı Sports Hall	2000

== Transportation ==
Cilicia has a well-developed transportation system with two airports, two major seaports, motorways and railway lines on the historical route connecting Europe to Middle East.

=== Air ===
Cilicia is served by two airports. Adana Şakirpaşa Airport is an international airport that have flights to European destinations. There are daily domestic flights to Istanbul, Ankara, İzmir, Antalya and Trabzon. Adana Şakirpaşa Airport serves the provinces of Mersin, Adana and Osmaniye.

Railway connections of Cilicia

Hatay Airport, opened in 2007, is a domestic airport, and currently has flights to Istanbul, Ankara and Nicosia, TRNC. Hatay Airport mostly serves Hatay Province.

Another under construction airport is Çukurova Regional Airport, According to the newspaper Hürriyet, the project's cost will be 357 million Euro. When finished, it will serve to 15 million people, and the capacity will be doubled in the future.

=== Sea ===
There are daily seabus and vehicle-passenger ferry services from Taşucu to Kyrenia, Northern Cyprus. From Mersin port, there are ferry services to Famagusta.

=== Road ===
The O50–O59 motorways crosses Cilicia. Motorways of Cilicia extends to Niğde on the north, Erdemli on the west and Şanlıurfa on the east, and İskenderun on the south. State road D-400 connects Cilicia to Antalya on the west. Adana–Kozan, Adana–Karataş, İskenderun–Antakya–Aleppo double roads are other regional roads.

=== Railway ===
Parallel to the highway network in Cilicia, there is an extensive railway network. Adana-Mersin train runs as a commuter train between Mersin, Tarsus and Adana. There are also regional trains from Adana to Ceyhan, Osmaniye and İskenderun.

== Society ==
Cilicia was one of the most important regions for the Ottoman Armenians because it managed very well to preserve Armenian character throughout the years. In fact, the Cilician highlands were densely populated by Armenians in small but prosperous towns and villages such as Hadjin and Zeitun, two mountainous areas where autonomy was maintained until the 19th century. In ports and cities of the Adana plain, commerce and industry were almost entirely in the hands of the Armenians and they remained so thanks to a constant influx of Armenians from the highlands. Their population was continuously increasing in numbers in Cilicia in contrast to other parts of the Ottoman Empire, where it was, since 1878, decreasing due to repression.

== List of rulers ==
=== Satraps ===
- Camisares (Ancient Greek: Καμισσάρης, romanized: Kamissárēs), r. c. 390s – c. 385 BC
- Datames (Ancient Greek: Δατάμης, romanized: Datamēs; Old Persian: *Dātamah), r. c. 385 – c. 362 BC
- Mazaeus (Ancient Greek: Μαζαῖος, romanized: Mazaîos; Old Persian: *Mazdāyah), r. c. 340s – 333 BC

=== Roman client kings ===
- Tarcondimotus I (Ancient Greek: Ταρκονδίμοτος, romanized: Tarkondímotos; Luwian: *Tarḫuntamu(wa)tas), r. c. 40s – 31 BC
- Tarcondimotus II (Ancient Greek: Ταρκονδίμοτος, romanized: Tarkondímotos; Luwian: *Tarḫuntamu(wa)tas), r. c. 30s – c. 17 BC

== Sources ==
- Berger, Albrecht [in German] (2003). "Cilices, Cilicia". In Cancik, Hubert [in German]; Schneider, Helmuth [in German]; Salazar, Christine F.; Möller, Astrid [in German]; Ruppel, Antonia; Warburton, David [in German] (eds.). Brill's New Pauly: Encyclopaedia of the Ancient World. Vol. 3. Leiden, Netherlands; Boston, United States: Brill. p. 331. doi:10.1163/1574-9347_bnp_e613620. ISBN 90-04-12259-1.
- Bryce, Trevor (2009). The Routledge Handbook of the Peoples and Places of Ancient Western Asia: From the Early Bronze Age to the Fall of the Persian Empire. London, United Kingdom: Routledge. ISBN 978-0-415-39485-7.
- Grant, Michael (1997). A Guide to the Ancient World. New York City, United States: Barnes & Noble, Inc. ISBN 0-7607-4134-4.
- Grayson, A.K. [in German] (1975). Assyrian and Babylonian Chronicles. Texts from Cuneiform Sources. Vol. 5. Locust Valley, United States: J. J. Augustin Publisher.
- Hawkins, J.D. [in German] (1975). "Ḫilakku". In Edzard, Dietz Otto; Calmeyer, P.; Moortgat, A.; Otten, H.; Röllig, Wolfgang [in German]; v. Soden, W.; Wiseman, D. J. (eds.). Reallexikon der Assyriologie und Vorderasiatischen Archäologie [Encyclopaedia of Ancient Near Eastern Studies]. Vol. 4. Berlin, Germany; New York City, United States: Walter de Gruyter. pp. 402–403. ISBN 978-3-11-006772-9.
- Houwink ten Cate, Ph. H. J. (1961). "The Compound Luwian Names of the Hellenistic Period". The Luwian Population Groups of Lycia and Cilicia Aspera During the Hellenistic Period. Documenta et Monumenta Orientis Antiqui. Leiden, Netherlands: Brill.
- Novák, Mirko [in German] (2010). "Kizzuwatna – Ḥiyawa – Quwe. Ein Abriss der Kulturgeschichte des Ebenen Kilikien" [Kizzuwatna – Ḥiyawa – Quwe. An outline of the cultural history of Plain Cilicia.]. In Becker, Jörg; Ralph, Hempelmann; Rehm, Ellen [in German] (eds.). Kulturlandschaft Syrien. Festschrift für Jan-Waalke Meyer [Syrian Cultural Landscape: Festschrift for Jan-Waalke Meyer]. Alter Orient und Altes Testament. Vol. 371. Münster, Germany: Ugarit-Verlag. pp. 397–425. ISBN 978-3-868-35034-0.
- Simon, Zsolt (2021). "401 BC: The Year the Neo-Hittite Statehood Ended". In Payne, Annick; Velhartická, Šárka; Wintjes, Jorit [in German] (eds.). Beyond All Boundaries: Anatolia in the First Millennium BC. Orbis Biblicus et Orientalis. Vol. 295. Leuven, Belgium: Peeters Publishers. pp. 675–688. ISBN 978-9-042-94884-6.
- Täuber, Hans [in German] (2003a). "Cilices, Cilicia". In Cancik, Hubert [in German]; Schneider, Helmuth [in German]; Salazar, Christine F.; Möller, Astrid [in German]; Ruppel, Antonia; Warburton, David [in German] (eds.). Brill's New Pauly: Encyclopaedia of the Ancient World. Vol. 3. Leiden, Netherlands; Boston, United States: Brill. pp. 329–330. doi:10.1163/1574-9347_bnp_e613620. ISBN 90-04-12259-1.
- Täuber, Hans [in German] (2003b). "Cilicia". In Cancik, Hubert [in German]; Schneider, Helmuth [in German]; Salazar, Christine F.; Möller, Astrid [in German]; Ruppel, Antonia; Warburton, David [in German] (eds.). Brill's New Pauly: Encyclopaedia of the Ancient World. Vol. 3. Leiden, Netherlands; Boston, United States: Brill. pp. 329–330. doi:10.1163/1574-9347_bnp_e613620. ISBN 90-04-12259-1.
- Weiskopf, Michael (1991). "Cilicia". Encyclopædia Iranica. New York City, United States: Encyclopædia Iranica Foundation; Brill Publishers.
