= Cadusian campaign of Artaxerxes II =

Persian military campaign against the Cadusii (385 BC)

Artaxerxes' Cadusian Campaign
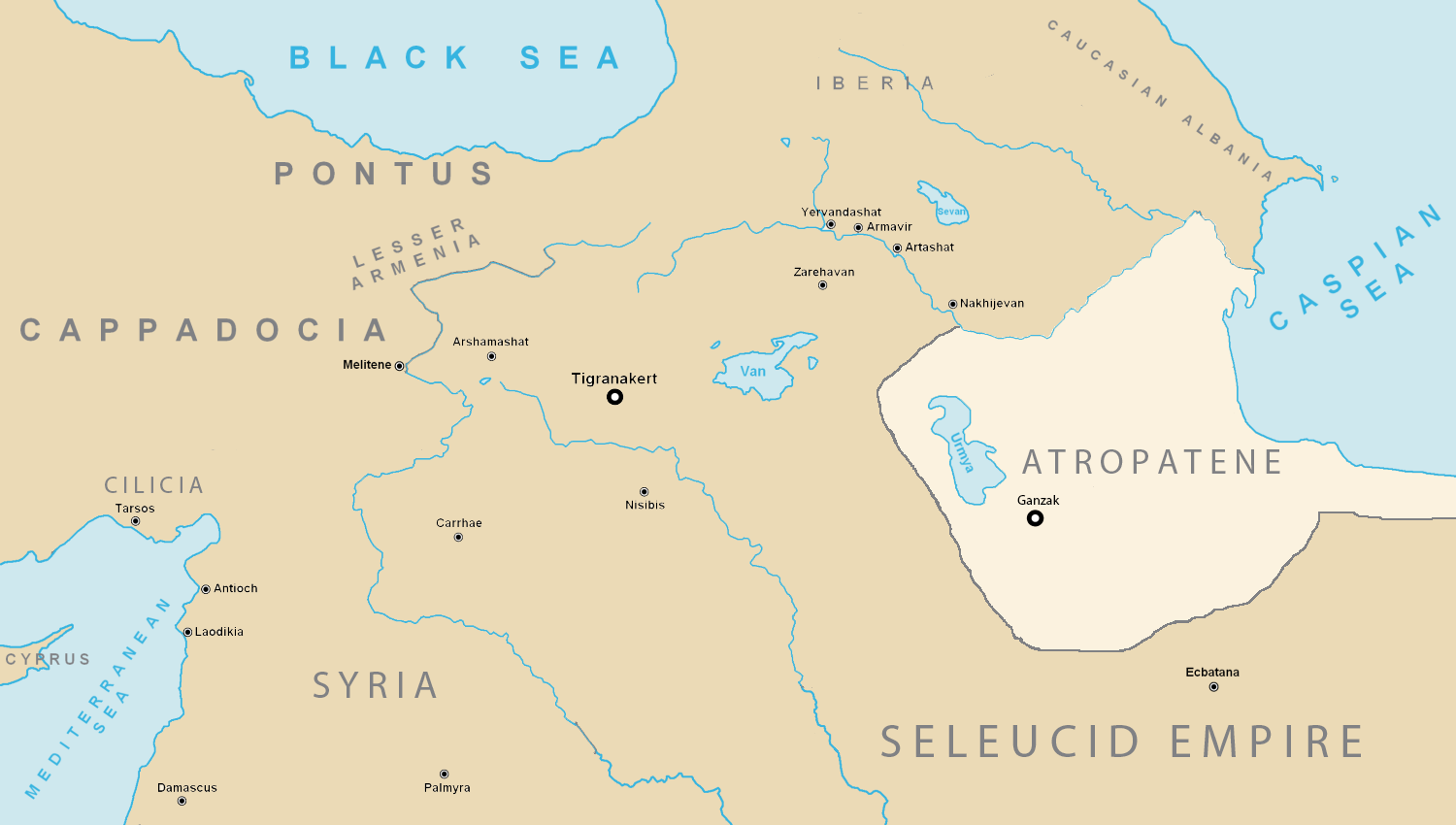
- Media Atropatene, location of the Cadusian campaign
Date	385 BC
Location	Media Atropatene
Result	Achaemenid victory

Belligerents
Achaemenid Empire	Cadusii

Commanders and leaders
Artaxerxes II of Persia; Tiribazus; Datames	Unknown

Strength
300,000 infantry 10,000 cavalry	Unknown

The Cadusian Campaign was a military campaign of King Artaxerxes II of Persia in 385 BC against the Cadusii. The origins of the campaign are not attested in historical sources, but it was probably in response to a revolt of the Cadusii and the refusal of paying tribute.

The Cadusii people lived in a mountainous district of Media Atropatene on the south-west shores of the Caspian Sea, between the parallels of 39° and 37° North latitude, called for its inhabitants Cadusia. This district was probably bounded on the North by the river Cyrus (today Kura, in Azerbaijan, historically known as Arran and Caucasian Albania), and on the South by the river Mardus (today Sefid River), and corresponds with the modern Iranian provinces of Gilan and Ardabil. They are described by Strabo as a warlike tribe of mountaineers, fighting chiefly on foot, and well skilled in the use of the short spear or javelin.

Artaxerxes organized an expedition that, according to Plutarch, consisted of 300,000 infantry soldiers and 10,000 cavalry soldiers. He commanded the expedition in person and among the officers accompanying him were Tiribazus and Datames. Advancing inside enemy territory, it didn't take long before the army started to suffer from starvation. The mountainous terrain offered little food but some pears, apples, and other tree-fruits insufficient to feed such a host of fighting men. The army was reduced to eating their own beasts of burden first and later their own cavalry mounts.

Tiribazus found a solution to resolve the campaign and save the King's army. He knew that the Cadusii were divided between two rival chiefs so he sent his son to negotiate with one while he negotiated with the other. Both Tiribazus and his son convinced the Cadusii chiefs that the other had sent envoys to the Persian King and sought an advantageous peace. Neither of the two chiefs wanting to be outmaneuvered by their rival, they submitted to Artaxerxes. With the successful negotiations concluded the army retreated, ending the campaign.

== Sources ==
- Rollin, Charles (1820). The ancient history of the Egyptians, Carthagininas, Assyrians, Babylonians, Medes and Persians, Macedonians, and Grecians. Vol. 4. Collins and co.
