= Camisares =

Achaemenid Satrap (died 385 BC)

Camisares (died 385 BC) was an Iranian, father of Datames, who was high in favour with the Persian Great King Artaxerxes II (404–358 BC), by whom he was made satrap of a part of Cilicia bordering on Cappadocia. He fell in Artaxerxes' war against the Cadusii in 385 BC, and was succeeded in his satrapy by Datames, his son by a Paphlagonian mother.

== Sources ==
- Bing, J. Daniel (1998). "Datames and Mazaeus: The Iconography of Revolt and Restoration in Cilicia". Historia: Zeitschrift für Alte Geschichte. 47 (1): 41–76. JSTOR 4436493. (registration required)
- Briant, Pierre (2002). From Cyrus to Alexander: A History of the Persian Empire. Eisenbrauns. pp. 1–1196. ISBN 9781575061207.
- Schmitt, Rüdiger (1994). "Datames". Encyclopaedia Iranica, Vol. VII, Fasc. 2. pp. 115–117.
- Sekunda, Nicholas Victor (1988). "Some Notes on the Life of Datames". Iran. 26. Taylor & Francis, Ltd.: 35–53. doi:10.2307/4299799. JSTOR 4299799. (registration required)
