= Osmaniye Korkut Ata University =

Public university in Osmaniye, Turkey

- Established: 2007
- Location: Osmaniye, Turkey
- Website: Official website

Osmaniye Korkut Ata University (Turkish:Osmaniye Korkut Ata Üniversitesi) is a university located in Osmaniye, Turkey. It was established in 2007. The university has 12,000 students, 158 academic staff, and 187 administrative staff.
