= Thyus =

4th-century BC Persian prince of Paphlagonia

Thyus (in Greek Θύoς or Θυς; lived 4th century BC) was a Persian prince of Paphlagonia (in today Turkey) who rebelled against Artaxerxes II. Datames, who was his first cousin, endeavoured to persuade him to return to his allegiance; but this had no effect, and on one occasion, when Datames had sought a friendly conference with him, Thyus laid a plot for his assassination. Datames escaped the danger through a timely warning given him by his mother, and, on his return to his own government, declared war against Thyus, subdued him, and made him a prisoner together with his wife and children. He then arrayed him in all the insignia of his royal rank, dressed himself in hunter's garb, and, having fastened a rope round Thyus, drove him before him with a cudgel, and brought him in this guise into the presence of Artaxerxes, as if he were a wild beast that he had captured. Cornelius Nepos describes Thyus as a man of huge stature and grim aspect, with dark complexion, and long hair and beard. Aelian notices him as notorious for his voracity, while Theopompus related that he was accustomed to have one hundred dishes placed on his table at one meal, and that, when he was imprisoned by Artaxerxes, he continued the same course of life, which drew from the king the remark that Thyus was living as if he expected a speedy death.
