= Datames =

4th-century BC Achaemenid satrap of Cappadocia

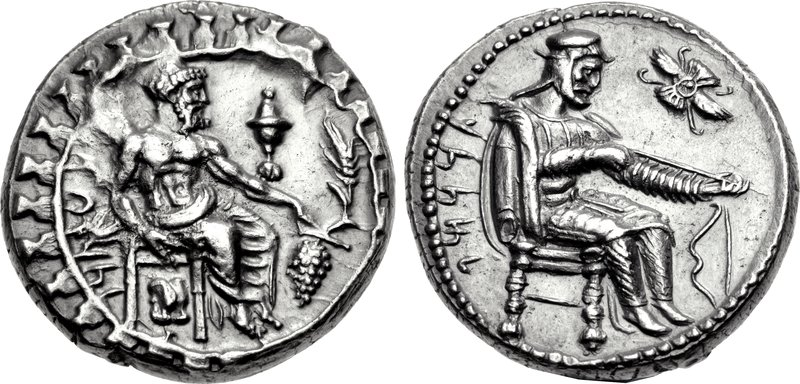
- Coin of Datames. The reverse shows Datames wearing a Persian dress whilst inspecting an arrow, and the obverse shows Baal

Satrap of Cappadocia
- In office 380 BC – 362 BC
- Preceded by: Ariaramnes
- Succeeded by: Ariamnes

Personal details
- Born: c. 407 BC
- Died: c. 362 BC
- Relations: Camisares (father); Scythissa (mother); Ariamnes (son); Sysinas (son)

Military service
- Allegiance: Achaemenid Empire; Satrapy of Cappadocia
- Battles/wars: Cadusian Campaign; Great Satraps' Revolt

Datames (Old Persian: Dātama or Dātāma, Aramaic: Tadanmu, Ancient Greek: Δατάμης, romanized: Datámēs; 407 BC – 362 BC), also known as Tarkamuwa, was an Iranian military leader, who served as the governor (satrap) of the Achaemenid satrapy of Cappadocia (or Cilicia; the evidence is contradictory) from the 380s BC to 362 BC. A Carian by birth, he was the son of Camissares by a Paphlagonian mother. His father being satrap of Cilicia under Artaxerxes II, and high in the favour of that monarch, Datames became one of the king's bodyguards; and having in this capacity distinguished himself in the war against the Cadusii, was appointed to succeed his father (who had fallen in that war) in the government of his province. Here he distinguished himself both by his military abilities and his zeal in the service of the king; and reduced to subjection two officials who had revolted from Artaxerxes, Thyus, governor of Paphlagonia, and Aspis of Cataonia.

== Name ==
"Datames" is the Hellenized form of the Old Iranian *Dātama- or *Dātāma-, either from Dātamiθra ("Gift of Mithra") or *Data-ama ("to whom force is given"). The name is attested in Aramaic as Tadanmu.

"Tarkumuwa" appears to be of Luwian origin, attested earlier in cuneiform as Tarḫumūwa from tarḫu- ("conquer") and mūwa ("mighty").

== Background ==
Datames was born in c. 407 BC. He was a son of Camisares, an Iranian satrap who governed Cilicia under the Achaemenid king Artaxerxes II (r. 404–358 BC). Camisares was most likely from a Persian noble-family that settled in Caria, and was one of the nobles who sided with Artaxerxes II during the revolt of Cyrus the Younger. Datames' mother was a Paphlagonian princess named Scythissa, who was married to Camisares sometime before 401 BC.

== Revolt against Artaxerxes II ==
He was in consequence entrusted by the Persian king with the chief command of a force designed for the recovery of Egypt, following the failure of Pharnabazus II; but the machinations of his enemies at the Persian court, and the risks to which he was in consequence exposed, induced him to change his plan, and throw off his allegiance to the king (c.370 BC). He withdrew with the troops under his command into Cappadocia, and made common cause with the other satraps who had revolted from Persia (the "Satraps' Revolt").

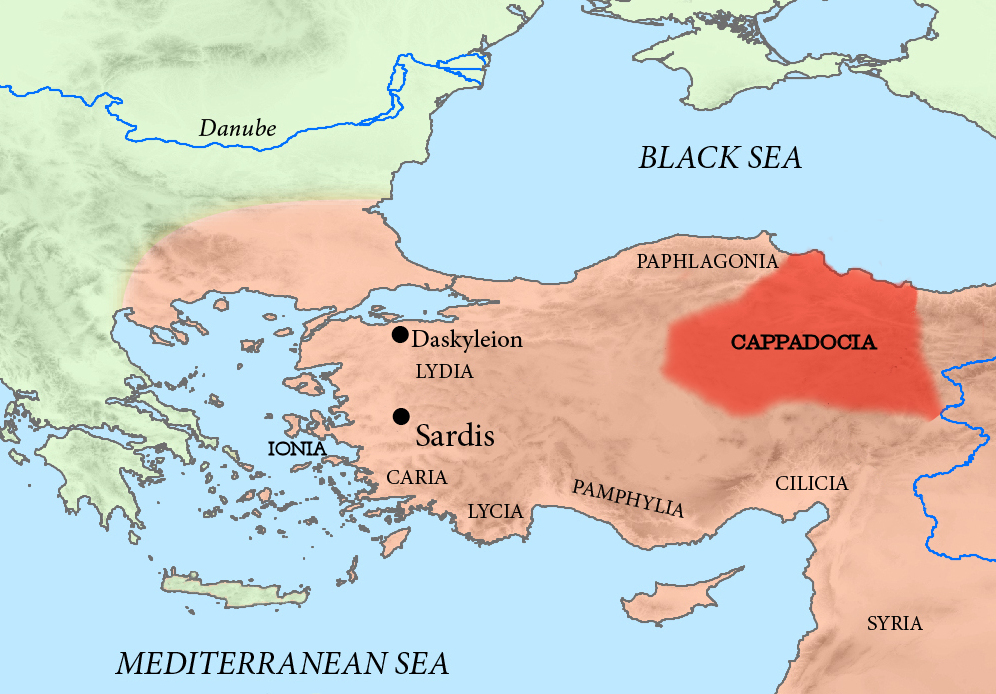
Datames was satrap of Achaemenid Cappadocia.

Artabazos, the satrap of Hellespontine Phrygia, one of the generals that remained faithful to the king, advanced against him from Pisidia, but was entirely defeated. The great reputation that Datames had acquired induced Artaxerxes to direct his utmost exertions to effect his subjection, but Autophradates, who was sent against him with a large army, was obliged to retreat with heavy loss. Datames, however, though constantly victorious against open foes, ultimately fell a victim to treachery, and, after evading numerous plots that had been formed against his life, was assassinated at a conference by Mithridates, the son of Ariobarzanes, who had gained his confidence by assuming the appearance of hostility to the king.

== Evaluation ==
Datames appears to have obtained the highest reputation in his day for courage and ability in war, which caused his fame to extend even among the Greeks, though he did not come into personal collision with them. Cornelius Nepos (to whose biographical sketch we owe the only connected narrative of his life) calls him the bravest and most able of all non-Greek and non-Roman generals, except Hamilcar and Hannibal; but there is much confusion in the accounts transmitted to us, and it is difficult to assign the anecdotes of him recorded by Polyaenus to their proper place in his history. The chronology of the events related by Nepos is also very obscure; but according to that author and Diodorus it would appear that Datames must have died before Artaxerxes, probably 362 BC.

He was succeeded by his son Ariamnes I ( Ancient Greek: Ἀριάμνης, Ariámnēs) who ruled 362 BC–330 BC as satrap of Cappadocia under Persian suzerainty.

== Sources ==
- Bing, J. Daniel (1998). "Datames and Mazaeus: The Iconography of Revolt and Restoration in Cilicia". Historia: Zeitschrift für Alte Geschichte. 47 (1): 41–76. JSTOR 4436493. (registration required)
- Briant, Pierre (2002). From Cyrus to Alexander: A History of the Persian Empire. Eisenbrauns. pp. 1–1196. ISBN 9781575061207.
- Schmitt, Rüdiger (1994). "Datames". In Yarshater, Ehsan (ed.). Encyclopædia Iranica. Vol. VII/2: Dastūr al-Afāżel–Dehqān I. London and New York: Routledge & Kegan Paul. pp. 115–117. ISBN 978-1-56859-020-2.
- Sekunda, Nicholas Victor (1988). "Some Notes on the Life of Datames". Iran. 26. Taylor & Francis, Ltd.: 35–53. doi:10.2307/4299799. JSTOR 4299799. (registration required)

Preceded by	Satrap of Cappadocia	Succeeded by Ariamnes
