= Cadusia =

Cadusia the land of the Cadusians, a satrapy under Tanaoxares.

According Moses Coit Tyler and George Rawlinson Cadusia was a thin strip of country along the south-eastern and southern shores of the Caspian, corresponding to the modern Gilan and Mazanderan. It hardly belonged to the great plateau, as it lay outside the Elburz mountain range, on the southern slopes of the chain, and between them and the Caspian Sea. It contained no important city, but was fertile, well-wooded and well-watered; and had a large population. Strabo wrote, that Cadusia was being part of Atropatene.
