= Binboğa =

Binboğa is a Turkish word, and may refer to:

== People ==
- Ali Rıza Binboğa (born 1950), Turkish singer

== Places ==
- Binboğa, Afşin, a village in Afşin district of Kahramanmaraş, Turkey
- Binboğa Mountains, a mountain range in southern Turkey
