= Binboğa Mountains =

Mountain range in Turkey

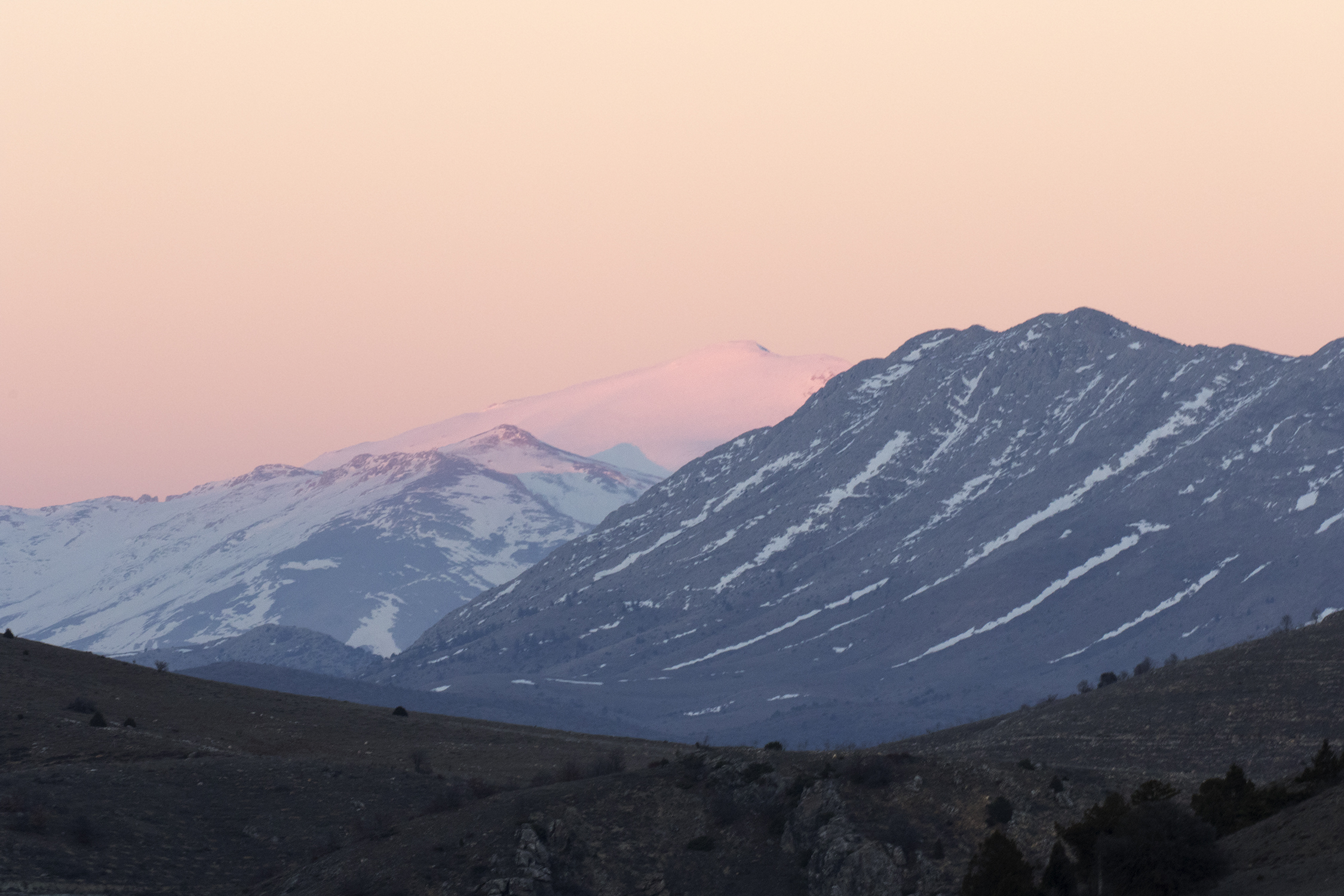
- A sunset view of Binboğa Mountains from Güzelim, Tufanbeyli - Adana, Turkey.

Highest point
- Peak: 2957
- Elevation: 1,330–2,957 m (4,364–9,701 ft)

Dimensions
- Area: 921.17 km^{2} (355.67 mi^{2})

Naming
- Native name: Binboğa Dağları (Turkish)

Geography
- Location within Turkey
- Country: Turkey
- Region: Kahramanmaraş
- Range coordinates: 38°20′N 36°35′E

Geology
- Rock age: end of the Cretaceous
- Rock type(s): Carbonate platform and Binboğa Mélange

Binboğa Mountains are a mountain range located in Kahramanmaraş Province, southern Turkey.

Binboğa Mountains are located at about [20 km (12 mi) west of Afşin, within Sarız in Kayseri Province, Afşin and Göksun districts in Kahramanmaraş Province, and are oriented in north–south direction. The mountain range stretches over an area of 92,117 ha (921.17 km^{2}), and has an elevation from 1,330 m (4,360 ft) up with its peak at 2,957 m (9,701 ft).

The Kayseri-Kahramanmaraş highway D.825 is situated on the west side of the mountain range. The Afşin Plains neighbor to the eastern mountainside. Settlements on the western side are Keklikoluk, Dayıoluk, Ördekli, Tavla and on the eastern side Yeniyapan, Büyükkızılcık, Binboğa, Türkçayırı. Highlands in the region are Subatan, Evciyurdu, Ebelik and Osmanoğlu, which serve as summer season resort.

The general geology of the Binboğa Mountains, which is a part of the Eastern Taurus Mountains, is represented by the lithology of Carbonate platform and Binboğa Mélange formation, which was created when South Neotethys closed off at the end of the Cretaceous period. Hurman and Göksun are two creeks, which spring off the mountain range. In terms of botanic, Binboğa Mountains are habitat of a quite rich vegetation. There are a rich population of endemic flora, such as the hyacinth species, which grow on rocks. Nature and National Parks Directorate of Kahramanmaraş Province recorded 177 endemic flora species on Binboğa Mountains. Main endangered endemic plants of Turkey are Allium glumaceum, Anthemis adonidifolia, Centaurea haussknechtii, Ferula longipedunculata, Graellsia davisiana, Silene balansae and Verbascum subserratum. Forests of Fir (Abies), Juniper, Pinus nigra subsp. pallasian, oak (Quercus) and mixed coniferous trees cover the mountains. Another main habitat of the mountain range is mountain steppe, which has rich vegetation and is important in regard of endemic flora.

Intense grazing of rare and endangered plants resulting from transhumance at the highlands of the mountain range and related animal husbandry is seen as a threat.
