= Graellsia =

Graellsia may refer to:

- Graellsia isabellae, a species of European moth belonging to the monotypic genus Graellsia
- Graellsia (plant), a genus of cruciferous plant
- Graellsia (journal), a Spanish zoological journal
