= Hayati Vasfi Taşyürek =

Turkish poet, writer and politician. (1931 - 1990)

Hayati Vasfi Taşyürek (May 17, 1931, Tanır, Afşin, Kahramanmaraş - April 20, 1990, Ankara), Turkish poet, writer, politician.

He was born as the son of Captain Hüseyin Dede Efendi and Zöhre Hanım. He educated himself without any formal education. He served as mayor of Tanır for two terms. He used the pseudonym "Vasfî" in his poems. This pseudonym was given to him by his master M. Ferahî Sag.
