= Haticepınar =

- Neighbourhood
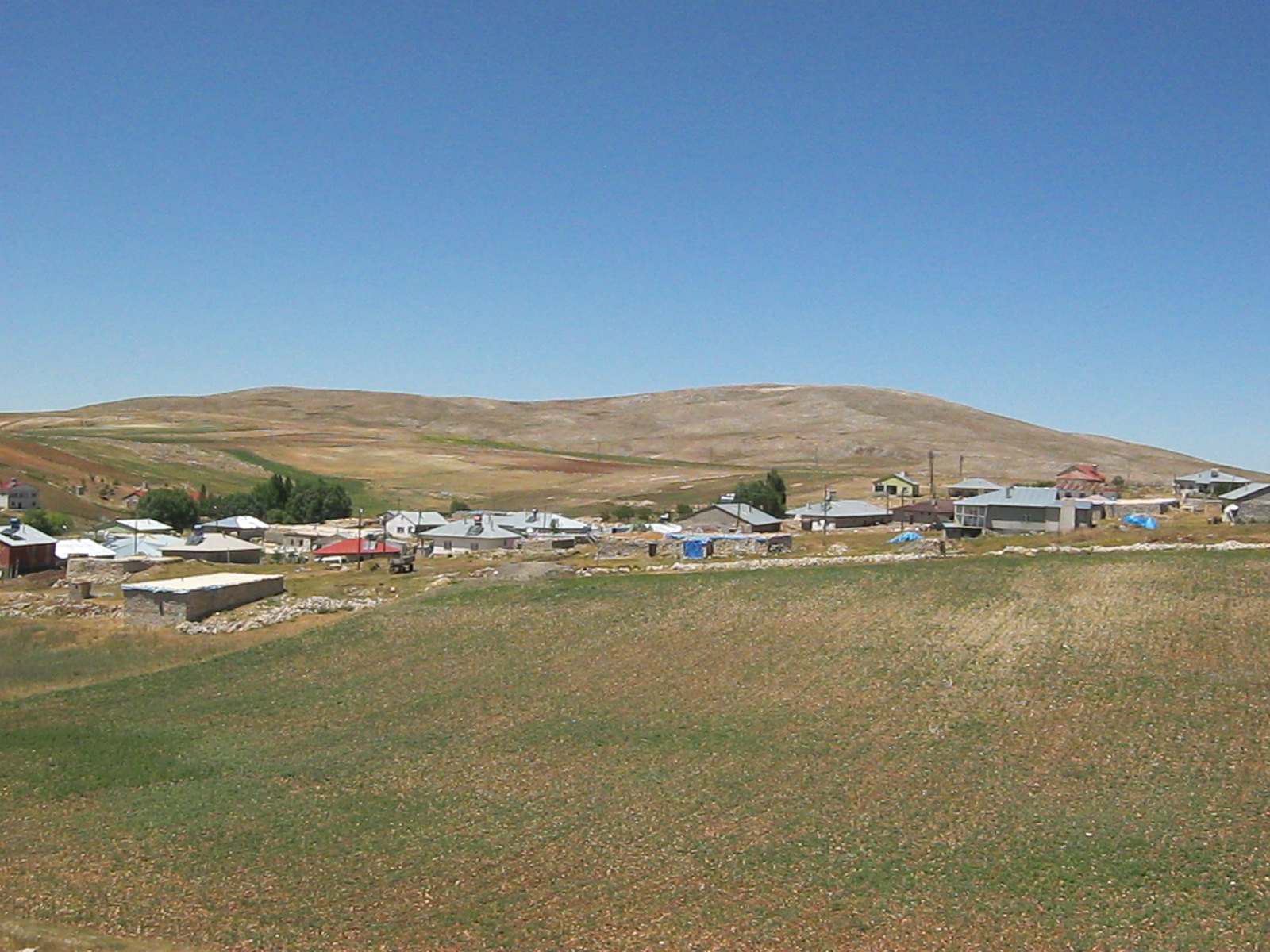

- Location within Turkey
- Coordinates: 38°33′32″N 37°01′54″E
- Country: Turkey
- Province: Kahramanmaraş
- District: Afşin
- Population (2022): 98
- Time zone: UTC+3 (TRT)
- Postal code: 46500
- Area code: 0344

Haticepınar is a neighbourhood of the municipality and district of Afşin, Kahramanmaraş Province, Turkey. Its population is 98 (2022).

== Geography ==
Haticepınar is 55 km away from Afşin and 205 km from Kahramanmaraş city centre. Haticepınar is located on the mountainous region of the Binboğa Mountains and for this arable lands are limited. On the west of the village is the village of Oğlakkaya, on the south is the Örenli village, on the north is the Güldede village of Gürün District and on the east is the district of Elbistan.

== Population ==
Historical population
Year	Pop.	±% p.a.
1990	176	—
1997	117	−5.67%
2007	79	−3.85%
2012	90	+2.64%
2017	94	+0.87%
2022	98	+0.84%
Source: 1990 census, 1997 census and TÜIK (2007-2022)
