= Microbialite =

Sedimentary precipitation of carbonate induced by microbes

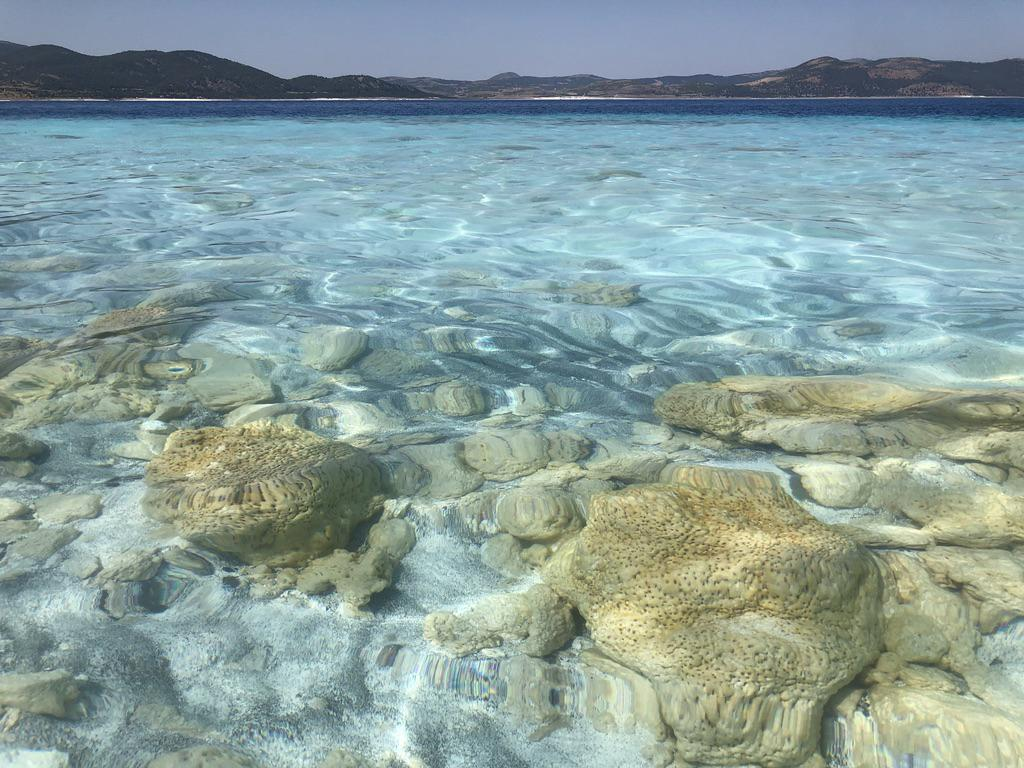
Microbialites in Lake Salda rocks

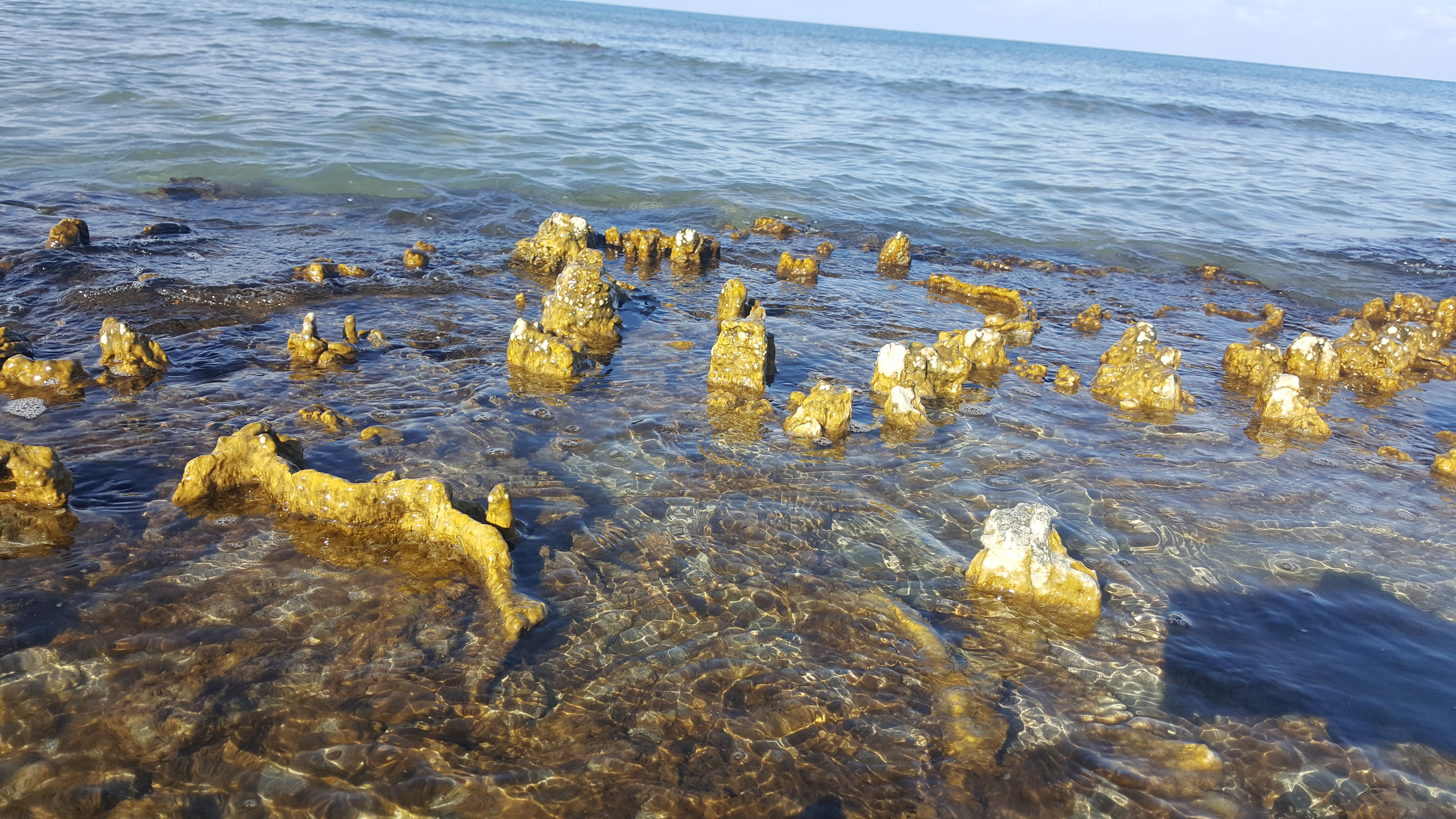
Emerged microbialite formation at Lake Van, East Anatolia

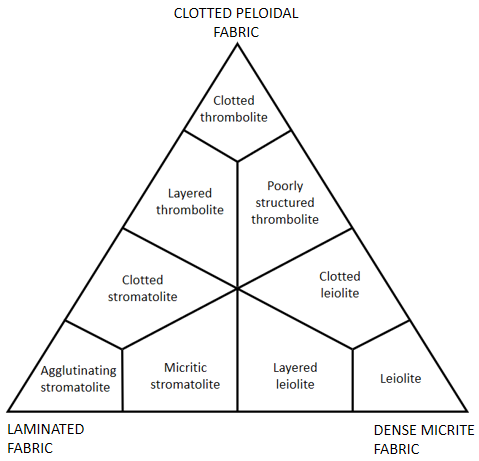
Classification of microbialites (redrawn and simplified from Schmid, 1996).

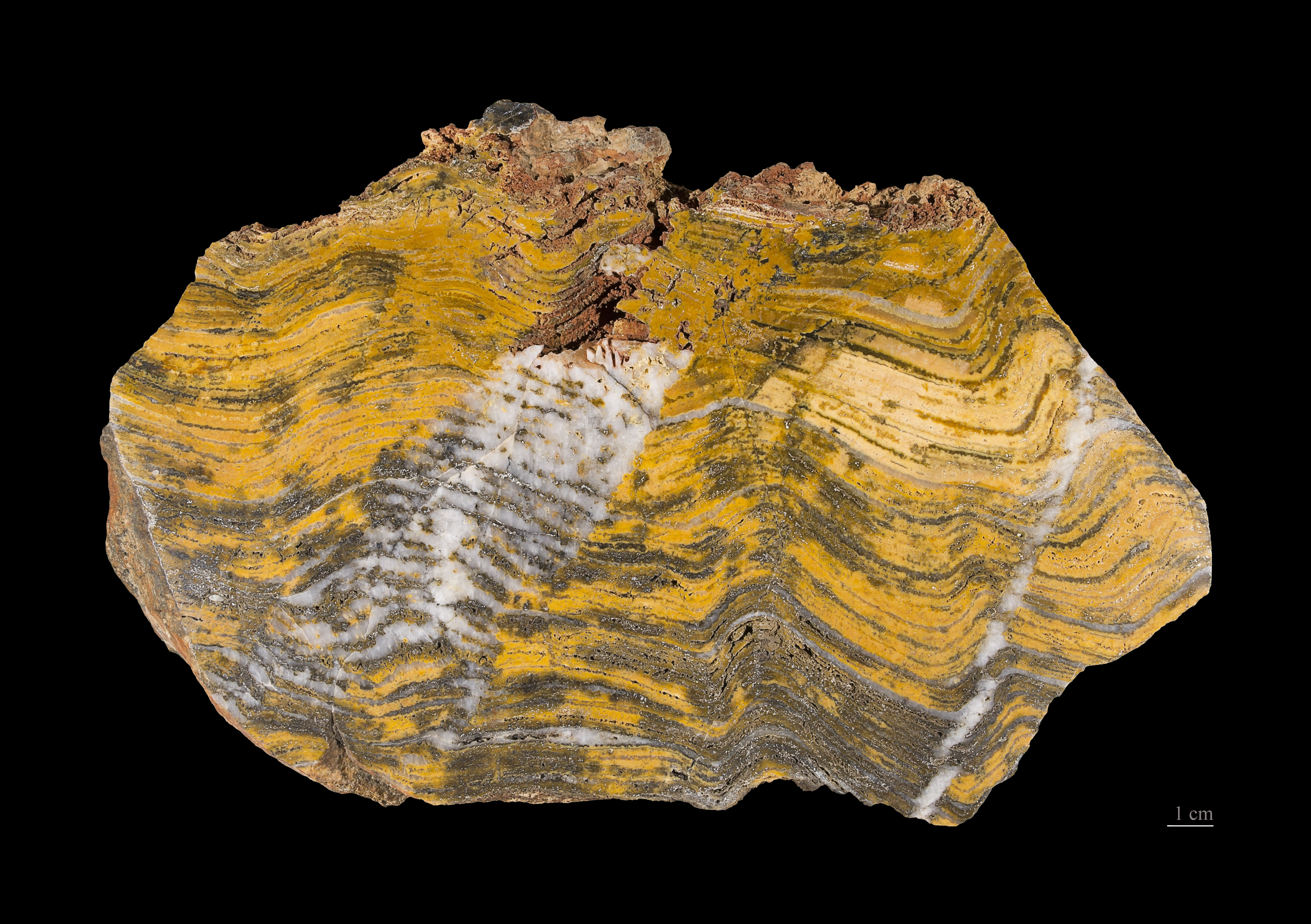
Stromatolites – laminated microbialites (Precambrian silicified stromatolite, Strelley Pool Chert, (Pilbara Craton), W. Australia)

Microbialite is a benthic sedimentary deposit made of carbonate mud (particle diameter less than 5 μm) that is formed with the mediation of microbes. The constituent carbonate mud is a type of automicrite (or authigenic carbonate mud); therefore, it precipitates in situ instead of being transported and deposited. Being formed in situ, a microbialite can be seen as a type of boundstone where reef builders are microbes, and precipitation of carbonate is biotically induced instead of forming tests, shells or skeletons.

Microbialites can also be defined as microbial mats with lithification capacity. Bacteria can precipitate carbonate both in shallow and in deep water (except for Cyanobacteria) and so microbialites can form regardless of the sunlight.

Microbialites are the foundation of many lacustrine ecosystems, such as the biosystem of the Great Salt Lake with its millions of migratory birds or, serving in the Alchichica Lake as nurseries for axolotl (Ambystoma taylori) and a variety of fish.

Microbialites were very important to the formation of Precambrian and Phanerozoic limestones in many different environments, marine and not. The most favorable time for stromatolite proliferation was from 2800 Ma to 1000 Ma when stromatolites were the main constituents of carbonate platforms. The three types of microbialites are stromatolites, thrombolites, and leiolites.

== Classification ==
Microbialites can have three different fabrics:

- Stromatolitic: microbialite layered, laminated or agglutinated to form a stromatolite.
- Thrombolitic: microbialite with a clotted peloidal fabric if observed with a petrographic microscope. The density of peloids is variable. At the scale of the hand sample, the rock shows a dendritic fabric, and can be named thrombolite.
- Leiolitic: a microbialite with no layering nor clotted peloidal fabric. It is only made of a dense automicrite.

== Evolution ==
Microbialites played an important role in the evolution of the Earth's atmosphere, since they were ancestral niches where the first microbial metabolisms capable of releasing oxygen arose. Microbialites saturated coastal systems and later the primitive atmosphere with oxygen, changing it from a reduced state to an oxidized state. The fossil microbialites (also called stromatolites) of the Precambrian and Phanerozoic are one of the first evidences of communal life. The oldest microbialites are dated at 3.5 billion years. Fossil evidence suggests that microbialite-producing organisms were a very abundant life form from the early Archaean to the late Proterozoic, until their communities decreased due to the predation of foraminifera and other eukaryotic microorganisms. Microbialites again became common briefly after the Permian-Triassic extinction event.

== Formation of microbialites ==
The formation of microbialites is complex and is a continuous process of precipitation and dissolution, where different microbial metabolisms are coupled and a high saturation index (SI) of ions in water is present.

Microbialites have two possible genesis mechanisms:

1) Mineral precipitation: is the main formation process of microbialites and it can be due to inorganic precipitation or to the passive influence of microbial metabolisms. There can also be precipitation due to saturation of the microenvironment when extracellular polymeric substances (EPS) are rapidly degraded, increasing ion saturation.

2) Trapping and binding: when the microbial community includes mineral particles of the environment that adhere to the extracellular polymeric substances (EPS). This process is very popular, since it was described in modern microbialites of Shark Bay (Australia) and Bahamas, but it has been shown to be very uncommon throughout the 3500 million year long geological history of microbialites.

== Modern microbialites distribution ==
Living modern microbialites (less than 20,000 years old) are rare and can be found confined to places such as:

- Crater lakes: Blue Lake (Australia), Lake Satonda (Indonesia), Lake Dziani (Mayotte Island), Lake Alchichica (Mexico), Lake Vai Lahi and Lake Vai Sii (Tonga), Lake Salda (Turkey)
- Saline / hypersaline lakes / lagoons: Pyramid Lake and Great Salt Lake (United States), Lagoa Salgada and Lagoa Vermelha (Brazil), Lake Van (Turkey), Brava Lagoon and Tebinquicho Lagoon (Chile), Laguna Negra, Catamarca (Argentina), Storr Lake (Bahamas), Laguna Pirata (Venezuela), Laguna Providencia (Puerto Rico)
- Alkaline lakes: Lake Thetis (Australia), Lake Sarmiento (Chile), Lake Nuoertu and Lake Huhejaran (China), Mono Lake (United States), Lake Turkana (Kenya), Lake Petukhovskoe (Russia)
- Freshwater lakes / lagoons: Lagunas de Ruidera (Spain), Bacalar and Cuatro Cienagas (Mexico), Lake Richmond (Australia), Pavilion Lake (Canada), Green Lake (United States)
- Alkaline pools: Four swamp blue pools (Mexico)
- Abandoned open mines: Clinton Creek (Canada), Rio Tinto (Spain)
- Hot springs: Little Hot Creek (United States)
- Marine / Estuary / Estuary Systems: Shark Bay, Australia, Highbourne Cay (Bahamas), Tikehau (French Polynesia),Cayo Coco (Cuba), Lake Clifton, Western Australia.
- Ice-covered Antarctic lakes: Lake Joyce (McMurdo Dry Valleys)

== Composition ==
Microbialites are built up with layers of some organic component and of some mineral. The organic component is an elaborate microbial mat where different communities of microorganisms interact according to different metabolisms and create a micro-niche where oxygenic and anoxygenic phototrophic organisms coexist: nitrogen fixers, sulfur reducers, methaneotrophs, methanogens, iron oxidizers, and a large number of heterotrophic decomposers. The mineral component is composed of carbonates, generally calcium carbonate or magnesium carbonates such as hydromagnesite, although there may also be sintered silicones, that is, silicates; and include mineral forms of sulfur, iron (pyrite) or phosphorus. Carbonate is usually a type of autogenic automicrite, therefore it precipitates in situ. Microbialites can be viewed as a type of biogenic sedimentary rock where the reef builders are microbes and carbonate precipitation is induced. Microorganisms can precipitate carbonate in both shallow and deep waters

== Microbes that produce microbialites ==
A broad number of studies have analyzed the diversity of microorganisms living at the surface of microbialites. Very often, this diversity is very high and includes bacteria, archaea and eukaryotes. While the phylogenetic diversity of these microbial communities is pretty well assessed using molecular biology, the identity of the organisms contributing to carbonate formation remains uncertain. Interestingly, some microorganisms seem to be present in microbialites forming in several different lakes, defining a core microbiome. Microbes that precipitate carbonate to build microbialites are mostly prokaryotes, which include bacteria and archaea. The best known carbonate-producing bacteria are Cyanobacteria and Sulfate-reducing bacteria. Additional bacteria may play a prominent role, such as bacteria performing anoxygenic photosynthesis is. Archaea are often extremophiles and thus live in remote environments where other organisms cannot live, such as white smokers at the bottom of the oceans.

Eukaryotic microbes, instead, produce less carbonate than prokaryotes.

== Interest in studying microbialites ==
There is great interest in studying fossil microbialites in the field of paleontology since they provide relevant data on paleoclimate and function as bioclimatic indicators. There is also an interest in studying them in the field of astrobiology, as they are one of the first forms of life, one would expect to find evidence of these structures on other planets. The study of modern microbialites can provide relevant information and serve as environmental indicators for the management and conservation of protected natural areas. Due to their ability to form minerals and precipitate detrital material, biotechnological and bioremediation applications have been suggested in aquatic systems for carbon dioxide sequestration, since microbialites can function as carbon sinks.
