= Soğucak, Afşin =

Neighbourhood in Afşin, Kahramanmaraş, Turkey

Soğucak Astemrey
- Neighbourhood
- Location within Turkey
- Coordinates: 38°8′45.6″N 36°56′49.2″E
- Country: Turkey
- Province: Kahramanmaraş
- District: Afşin
- Elevation: 1,160 m (3,810 ft)
- Population (2000): 256
- Time zone: UTC+3 (TRT)
- Postal code: 46500
- Area code: 0344
- Climate: Dsa

Soğucak, also known as Astemrey (Kabardian: Астемрей) (Note: Variant forms include Astemirey (Астемирей) and Astemre (Астемрэ).) is a neighbourhood (mahalle) in the Afşin district of Kahramanmaraş province.

Soğucak is located around 124 kilometres (77 mi) from the city of Kahramanmaraş, 46 kilometres (29 mi) from nearby Göksun, and 12 kilometres (7.5 mi) from the town of Afşin itself.

The village's population was recorded as 256 in 2000, down from 408 in 1990. The village is mostly made up of Kabardian Circassians.
