= Carbonate platform =

Sedimentary body with topographic relief composed of autochthonous calcareous deposits

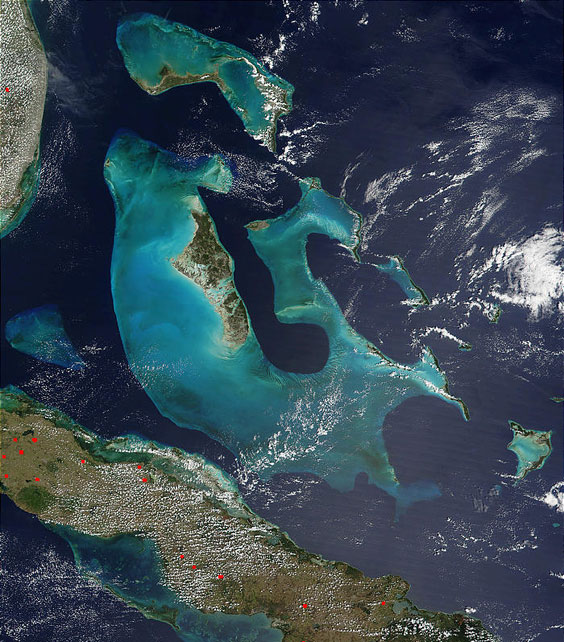
The Bahama Banks are an example of a carbonate platform

A carbonate platform is a sedimentary body which possesses topographic relief, and is composed of autochthonic calcareous deposits. Platform growth is mediated by sessile organisms whose skeletons build up the reef or by organisms (usually microbes) which induce carbonate precipitation through their metabolism. Therefore, carbonate platforms can not grow up everywhere: they are not present in places where limiting factors to the life of reef-building organisms exist. Such limiting factors are, among others: light, water temperature, transparency and pH. For example, carbonate sedimentation along the Atlantic South American coasts takes place everywhere but at the mouth of the Amazon River, because of the intense turbidity of the water there. Spectacular examples of present-day carbonate platforms are the Bahama Banks under which the platform is roughly 8 km thick, the Yucatan Peninsula which is up to 2 km thick, the Florida platform, the platform on which the Great Barrier Reef is growing, and the Maldive atolls. All these carbonate platforms and their associated reefs are confined to tropical latitudes. Today's reefs are built mainly by scleractinian corals, but in the distant past other organisms, like archaeocyatha (during the Cambrian) or extinct cnidaria (tabulata and rugosa) were important reef builders.

== Carbonate precipitation from seawater ==
What makes carbonate platform environments different from other depositional environments is that carbonate is a product of precipitation, rather than being a sediment transported from elsewhere, as for sand or gravel. This implies for example that carbonate platforms may grow far from the coastlines of continents, as for the Pacific atolls.

The mineralogic composition of carbonate platforms may be either calcitic or aragonitic. Seawater is oversaturated in carbonate, so under certain conditions CaCO_{3} precipitation is possible. Carbonate precipitation is thermodynamically favoured at high temperature and low pressure. Three types of carbonate precipitation are possible: biotically controlled, biotically induced and abiotic. Carbonate precipitation is biotically controlled when organisms (such as corals) are present that exploit carbonate dissolved in seawater to build their calcitic or aragonitic skeletons. Thus they may develop hard reef structures. Biotically induced precipitation takes place outside the cell of the organism, thus carbonate is not directly produced by organisms, but precipitates because of their metabolism. Abiotic precipitation, by definition, involves little or no biological influence.

== Classification ==
The three types of precipitation (abiotic, biotically induced and biotically controlled) cluster into three "carbonate factories". A carbonate factory is the ensemble of the sedimentary environment, the intervening organisms and the precipitation processes that lead to the formation of a carbonate platform. The differences between three factories is the dominant precipitation pathway and skeletal associations. In contrast, a carbonate platform is a geological structure of parautochotonous carbonate sediments and carbonate rocks, having a morphological relief.

=== Platforms produced by the "tropical factory" ===
In these carbonate factories, precipitation is biotically controlled, mostly by autotrophic organisms. Organisms that build this kind of platforms are today mostly corals and green algae, that need sunlight for photosynthesis and thus live in the euphotic zone (i.e., shallow water environments in which sunlight penetrates easily). Tropical carbonate factories are only present today in warm and sunlit waters of the tropical-subtropical belt, and they have high carbonate production rates but only in a narrow depth window. The depositional profile of a Tropical factory is called "rimmed" and includes three main parts: a lagoon, a reef and a slope. In the reef, the framework produced by large-sized skeletons, as those of corals, and by encrusting organisms resists wave action and forms a rigid build up that may develop up to sea-level. The presence of a rim produces restricted circulation in the back reef area and a lagoon may develop in which carbonate mud is often produced. When reef accretion reaches the point that the foot of the reef is below wave base, a slope develops: the sediments of the slope derive from the erosion of the margin by waves, storms and gravitational collapses. This process accumulates coral debris in clinoforms. The maximum angle that a slope can achieve is the settlement angle of gravel (30–34°).

=== Platforms produced by the "cool-water factory" ===
In these carbonate factories, precipitation is biotically controlled by heterotrophic organisms, sometimes in association with photo-autotrophic organisms such as red algae. The typical skeletal association includes foraminifers, red algae and molluscs. Despite being autotrophic, red algae are mostly associated to heterotrophic carbonate producers, and need less light than green algae. The range of occurrence of cool-water factories extends from the limit of the tropical factory (at about 30◦) up to polar latitudes, but they could also occur at low latitudes in the thermocline below the warm surface waters or in upwelling areas. This type of factories has a low potential of carbonate production, is largely independent from sunlight availability, and can sustain a higher amount of nutrients than tropical factories. Carbonate platforms built by the "cool-water factory" show two types of geometry or depositional profile, i.e., the homoclinal ramp or the distally-steepened ramp. In both geometries there are three parts: the inner ramp above the fair weather wave base, the middle ramp, above the storm wave base, the outer ramp, below the storm wave base. In distally steepened ramps, a distal step is formed between the middle and outer ramp, by the in situ accumulation of gravel-sized carbonate grains

=== Platforms produced by the "mud-mound factory" ===
These factories are characterised by abiotic precipitation and biotically induced precipitation. The typical environmental settings where "mud-mound factories" are found in the Phanerozoic are dysphotic or aphotic, nutrient-rich waters that are low in oxygen but not anoxic. These conditions often prevail in the thermocline, for example at intermediate water depths below the ocean's mixed layer. The most important component of these platforms is fine-grained carbonate that precipitates in situ (automicrite) by a complex interplay of biotic and abiotic reactions with microbes and decaying organic tissue. Mud-mound factories do not produce a skeletal association, but they have specific facies and microfacies, for example stromatolites, that are laminated microbialites, and thrombolites, that are microbialites characterized by clotted peloidal fabric at the microscopic scale and by dendroid fabric at the hand-sample scale. The geometry of these platforms is mound-shaped, where all the mound is productive, including the slopes.

== Geometry of carbonate platforms ==
Several factors influence the geometry of a carbonate platform, including inherited topography, synsedimentary tectonics, exposure to currents and trade winds. Two main types of carbonate platforms are distinguished on the base of their geographic setting: isolated (as Maldives atolls) or epicontinental (as the Belize reefs or the Florida Keys). However, the one most important factor influencing geometries is perhaps the type of carbonate factory. Depending on the dominant carbonate factory, we can distinguish three types of carbonate platforms: T-type carbonate platforms (produced by "tropical factories"), C-type carbonate platforms (produced by "cool-water factories"), M-type carbonate platforms ("produced by mud-mound factories"). Each of them has its own typical geometry.

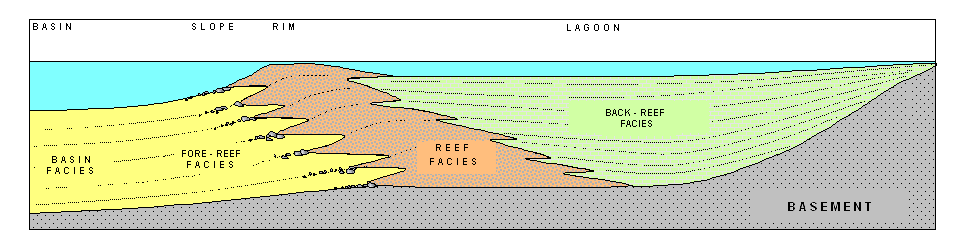
Generalized cross-section of a typical carbonate platform.

=== T-type carbonate platforms ===
The depositional profile of T-type carbonate platforms can be subdivided into several sedimentary environments.

The carbonate hinterland is the most landward environment, composed by weathered carbonate rocks. The evaporitic tidal flat is a typical low-energy environment.

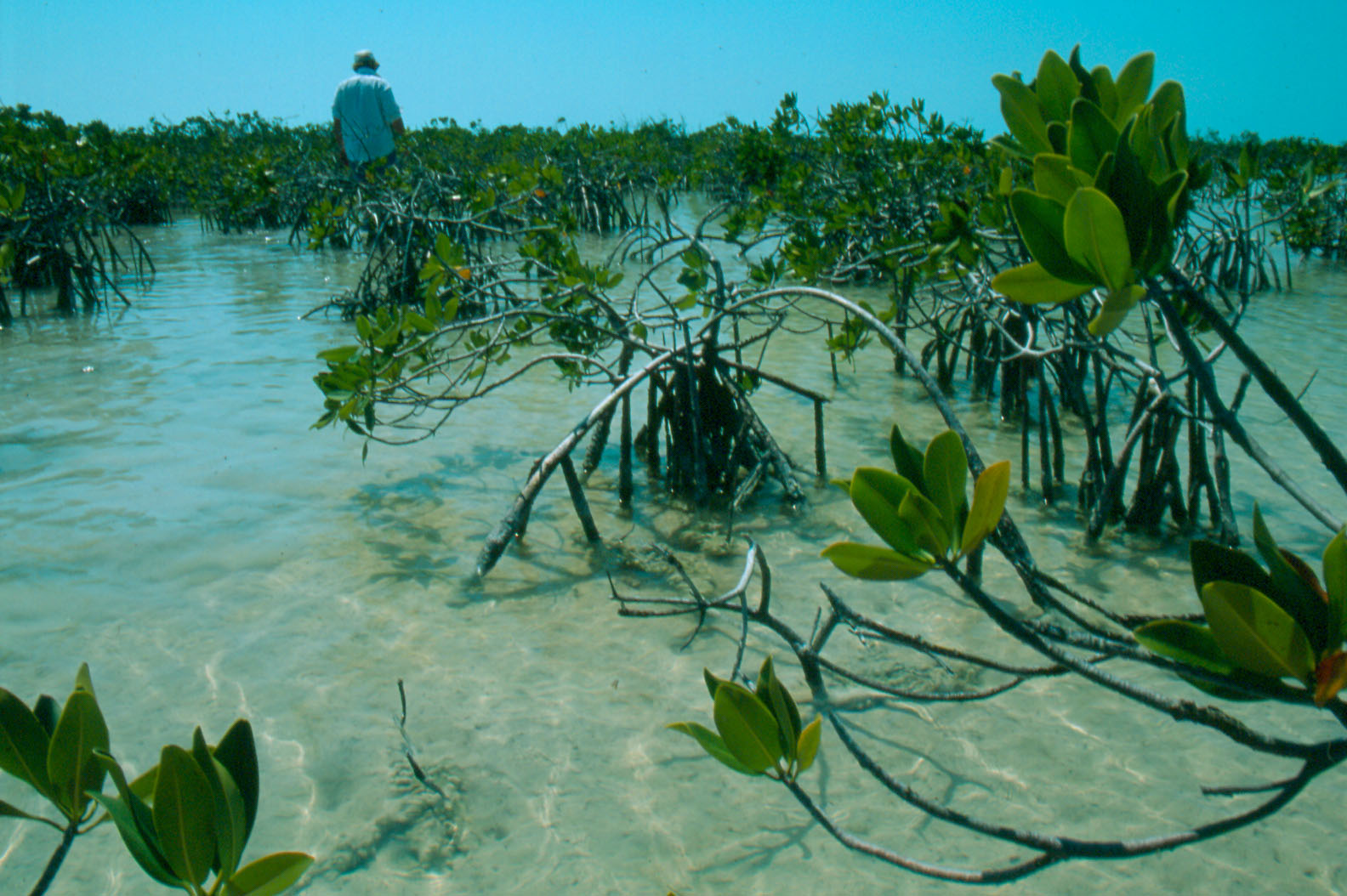
An example of carbonate mud sedimentation in the internal part of the Florida Bay lagoon. The presence of young mangroves is important to entrap the carbonate mud.

The internal lagoon, as the name suggests, is the part of platform behind the reef. It is characterised by shallow and calm waters, and so it is a low-energy sedimentary environment. Sediments are composed by reef fragments, hard parts of organisms and, if the platform is epicontinental, also by a terrigenous contribution. In some lagoons (e.g., the Florida Bay), green algae produce great volumes of carbonate mud. Rocks here are mudstones to grainstones, depending on the energy of the environment.

The reef is the rigid structure of carbonate platforms and is located between the internal lagoon and the slope, in the platform margin, in which the framework produced by large-sized skeletons, as those of corals, and by encrusting organisms will resist wave action and form a rigid build up that may develop up to sea-level. Survival of the platform depends on the existence of the reef, because only this part of the platform can build a rigid, wave-resistant structure. The reef is created by essentially in-place, sessile organisms. Today's reefs are mostly built by hermatypic corals. Geologically speaking, reef rocks can be classified as massive boundstones.

The slope is the outer part of the platform, connecting the reef with the basin. This depositional environment acts as sink for excess carbonate sediment: most of the sediment produced in the lagoon and reef is transported by various processes and accumulates in the slope, with an inclination depending on the grain size of sediments, and that could attain the settlement angle of gravel (30-34°) at most. The slope contains coarser sediments than the reef and lagoon. These rocks are generally rudstones or grainstones.

The periplatform basin is the outermost part of the t-type carbonate platform, and carbonate sedimentation is there dominated by density-cascating processes.

The presence of a rim damps the action of waves in the back reef area and a lagoon may develop in which carbonate mud is often produced. When reef accretion reaches the point that the foot of the reef is below wave base, a slope develops: the sediments of the slope derive from the erosion of the margin by waves, storms and gravitational collapses. This process accumulates coral debris in clinoforms. Clinoforms are beds that have a sigmoidal or tabular shape, but are always deposited with a primary inclination.

The size of a T-type carbonate platform, from the hinterland to the foot of the slope, can be of tens of kilometers.

=== C-type carbonate platforms ===
C-type carbonate platforms are characterized by the absence of early cementation and lithification, and so the sediment distribution is only driven by waves and, in particular, it occurs above the wave base. They show two types of geometry or depositional profile, i.e., the homoclinal ramp or the distally-steepened ramp. In both geometries there are three parts. In the inner ramp, above the fair weather wave base, the carbonate production is slow enough that all sediments may be transported offshore by waves, currents and storms. As a consequence, the shoreline may be retreating, and so in the inner ramp there may be a cliff caused by erosional processes. In the middle ramp, between the fair weather wave base and the storm wave base, carbonate sediment remains in place and can be reworking only by the storm waves. In the outer ramp, below the storm wave base, fine sediments may accumulate. In distally steepened ramps, a distal step is formed between the middle and outer ramp, by the in situ accumulation of gravel-sized carbonate grains (e.g., rhodoliths) only episodically moved by currents. Carbonate production occurs along the full depositional profile in this type of carbonate platforms, with an extra production in the outer part of the middle ramp, but carbonate production rates are always less than in the T-type carbonate platforms.

=== M-type carbonate platforms ===
M-type carbonate platforms are characterized by an inner platform, an outer platform, an upper slope made by microbial boundstone, and a lower slope often made by breccia. The slope may be steeper than the angle of repose of gravels, with an inclination that may attain 50°.

In the M-type carbonate platforms the carbonate production mostly occurs on the upper slope and in the outer part of the inner platform.

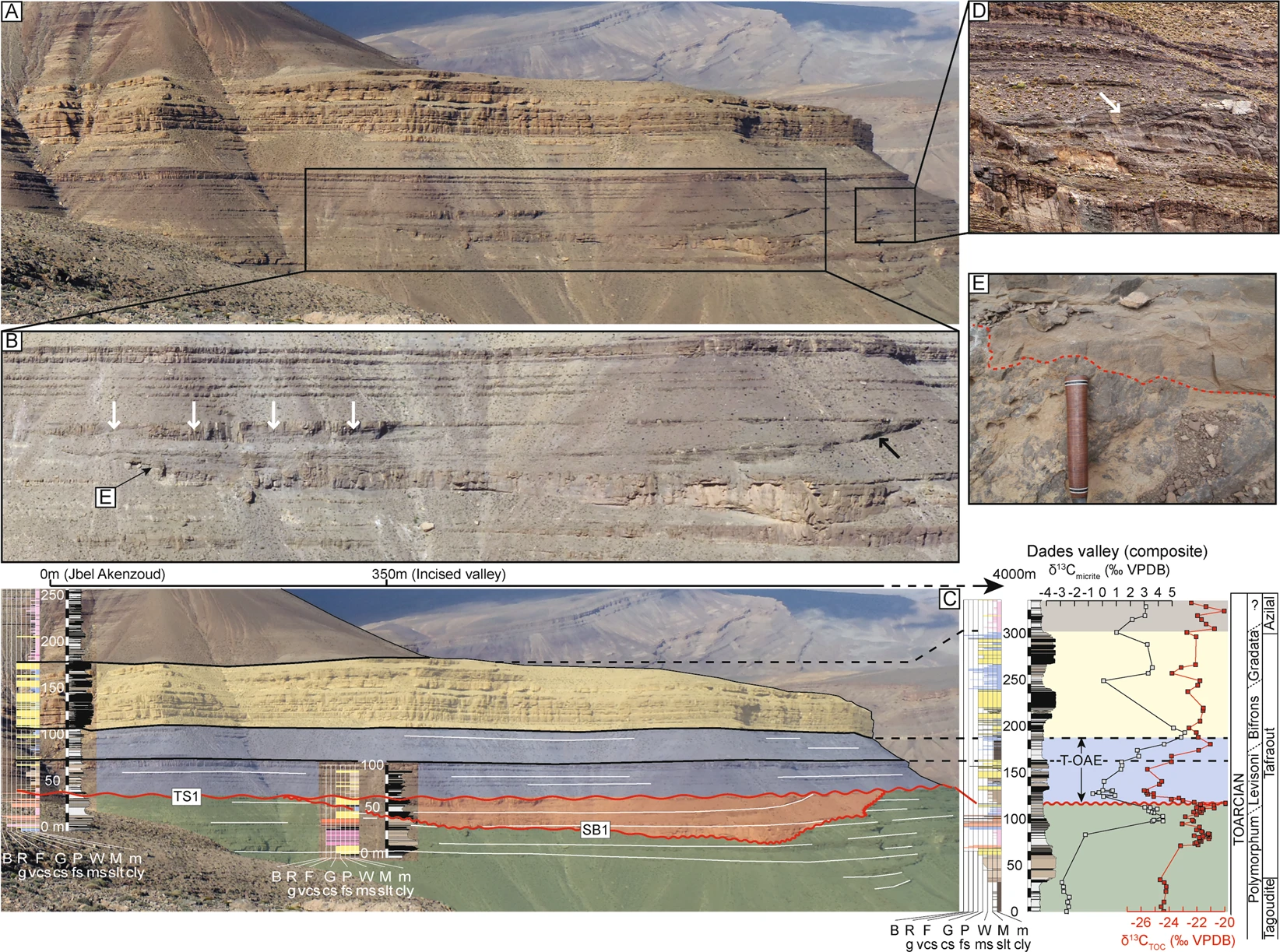
(A) The Siliclastic-Carbonate Tafraout Group at Jebel Akenzoud (Dadès Gorges, Central High Atlas Basin, Morocco). (B) Close-up view of the left-hand side of the panel. Lateral accretion within the ooidal shoal in the uppermost part of the infilling unit can be seen (white arrows). (C) Stratigraphic correlation. (D) Close up view on the right-hand side shoulder of the infilling unit. (E) Close up on the erosion surface.

== Carbonate platforms in the geological record ==
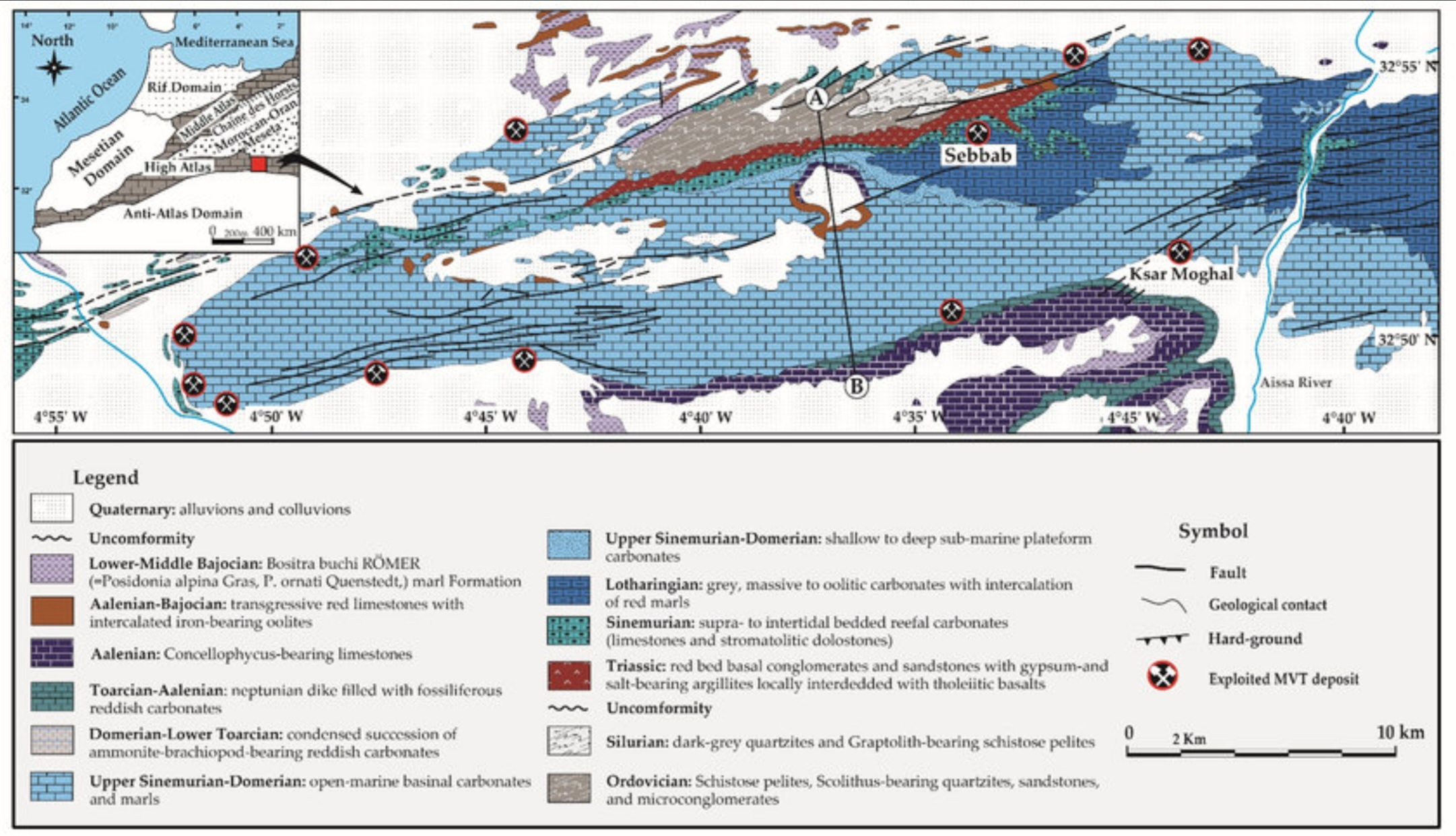
The Calcaires du Bou Dahar record a well preserved carbonate platform, including its sedimentary cycles and facies.

Sedimentary sequences show carbonate platforms as old as the Precambrian, when they were formed by stromatolitic sequences. In the Cambrian carbonate platforms were built by archaeocyatha. During Paleozoic brachiopod (richtofenida) and stromatoporoidea reefs were erected. At the middle of the Paleozoic era corals became important platforms builders, first with tabulata (from the Silurian) and then with rugosa (from the Devonian). Scleractinia become important reef builders beginning only in the Carnian (upper Triassic). Some of the best examples of carbonate platforms are in the Dolomites, deposited during the Triassic. This region of the Southern Alps contains many well preserved isolated carbonate platforms, including the Sella, Gardenaccia, Sassolungo and Latemar. The middle Liassic "bahamian type" carbonate platform was notoriously widespread in the western Tethys Ocean, including the Rotzo Formation on Italy, the Aganane Formation & the Calcaires du Bou Dahar of Morocco (Septfontaine, 1985) is characterised by the accumulation of autocyclic regressive cycles, spectacular supratidal deposits and vadose diagenetic features with dinosaur tracks. In the same area the overlying Tafraout Group (Toarcian-Aalenian) records a massive Siliclastic-Carbonate Platform. Other coeval records of platforms are seen in the Adriatic Platform, in areas such as the Dinaric Alps (The Seoca Lithiotis Limestone of Montenegro), Rotzo or the Podpeč Limestone of Slovenia. Others regional records include examples like the Coimbra Formation (Sinemurian) in the Lusitanian Basin. The Aalenian Iberian Platform includes Volcanic intrusions that led to ephemeral islands, like in the El Pedregal Formation. The Cretaceous (Campanian) Calcare di Aurisina in Italy, records a series of islands adjacent to a shallow carbonate sea in a platform built by bivalvia (rudists). The Tunisian coastal "chotts" and their cyclic muddy deposits represent a good recent equivalent (Davaud & Septfontaine, 1995). Such cycles were also observed on the Mesozoic Arabic platform, Oman and Abu Dhabi (Septfontaine & De Matos, 1998) with the same microfauna of foraminifera in an almost identical biostratigraphic succession.

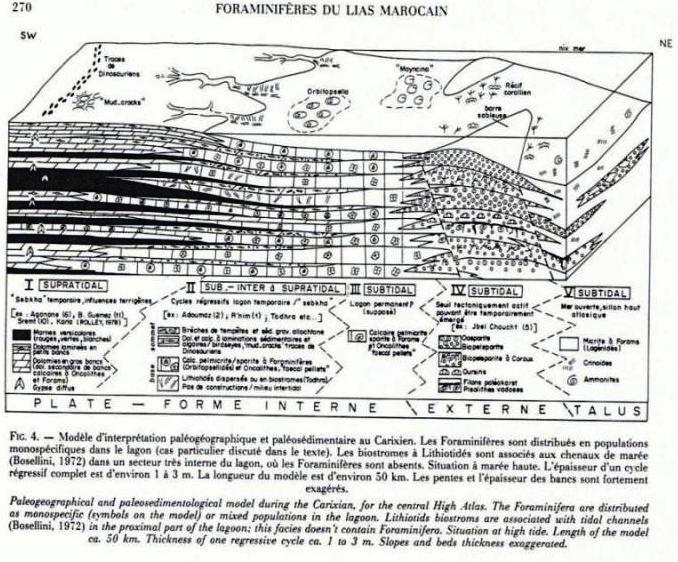
Aganane Formation platform of Morocco with first order autocyclic regressive cycles

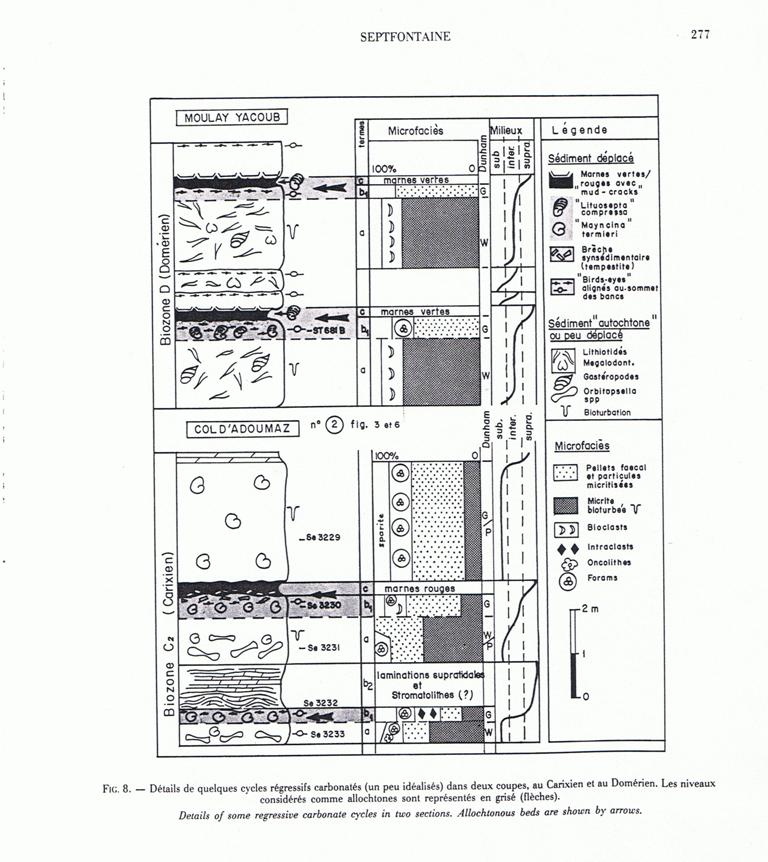
Aganane Formation metre-scale peritidal sedimentary cycles in two outcrops. The two outcrops are 230 km apart. Storm beds and possibly tsunamites include abundant reworked foraminifera. This image is an example of the continuity of peritidal cycles in a carbonate platform environment.

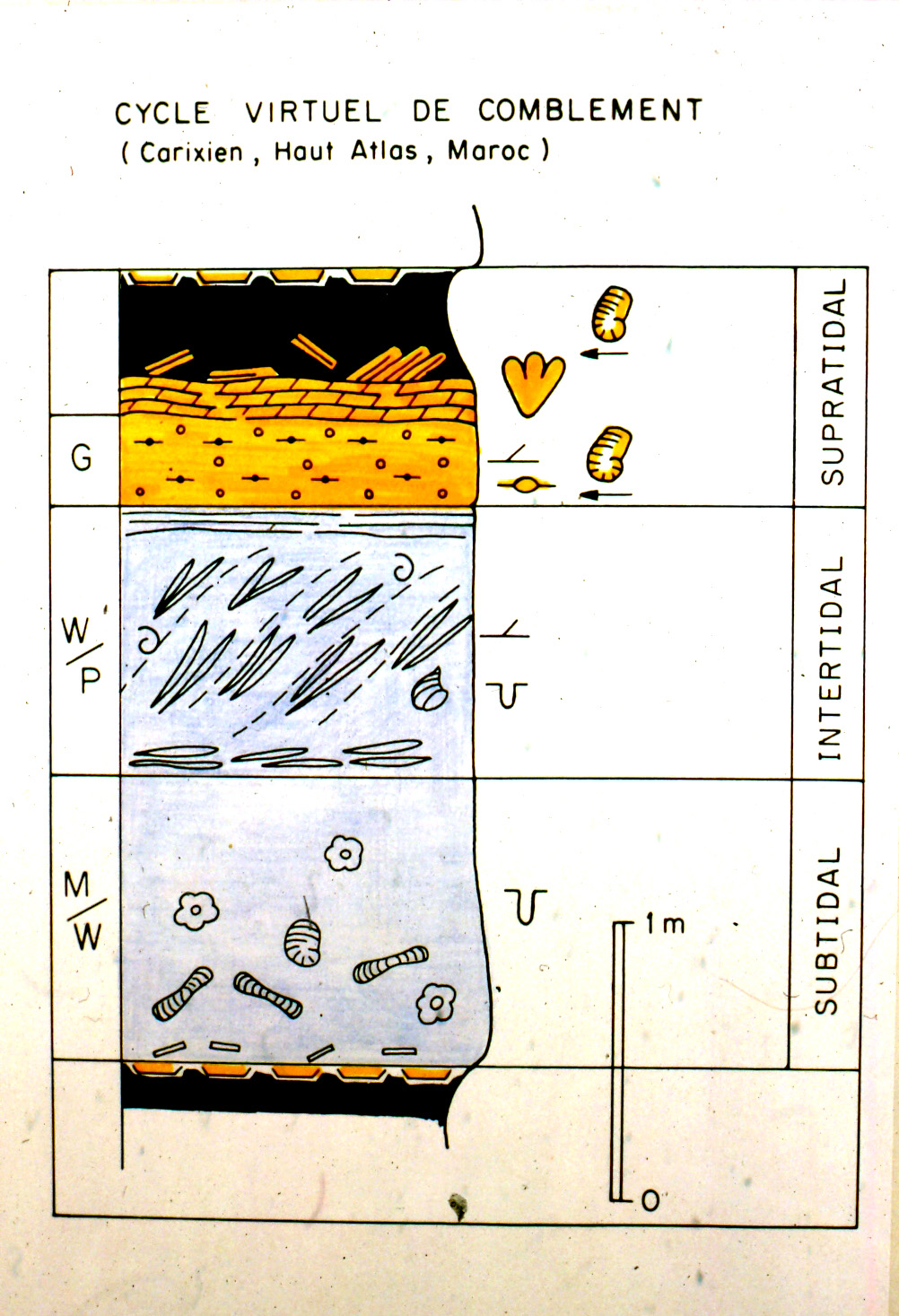
Virtual metric "shallowing upward sequence" observed all along (more than 10,000 km) the south Tethyan margin during middle Liassic times. The (micro)fossils are identical till Oman and beyond.

== Sequence stratigraphy of carbonate platforms ==
With respect to the sequence stratigraphy of siliciclastic systems, carbonate platforms present some peculiarities, which are related to the fact that carbonate sediment is precipitated directly on the platform, mostly with the intervention of living organisms, instead of being only transported and deposited. Among these peculiarities, carbonate platforms may be subject to drowning, and may be the source of sediment via highstand shedding or slope shedding.

=== Drowning ===
Drowning of a carbonate platform is an event where the relative sea level rise is faster than the accumulation rate on a carbonate platform, which eventually leads to the platform to submerge below the euphotic zone. In the geologic record of a drowned carbonate platform, neritic deposits change rapidly into deep-marine sediments. Typically hardgrounds with ferromanganese oxides, phosphate or glauconite crusts lie in between of neritic and deep-marine sediments.

Several drowned carbonate platforms have been found in the geologic record. However, it has not been very clear how the drowning of carbonate platforms exactly happen. Modern carbonate platforms and reefs are estimated to grow approximately 1,000 μm/yr, possibly several times faster in the past. 1,000 μm/yr growth rate of carbonates exceeds by orders of magnitude any relative sea level rise that is caused by long-term subsidence, or changes in eustatic sea level. Based on the rates of these processes, drowning of the carbonate platforms should not be possible, which causes "the paradox of drowned carbonate platforms and reefs".

Since drowning of carbonate platforms requires exceptional rise in the relative sea level, only limited number of processes can cause it. According to Schlager, only anomalously quick rise of relative sea level or benthic growth reduction caused by deteriorating changes in the environment could explain the drowning of platforms. For instance, regional downfaulting, submarine volcanism or glacioeustasy could be the reason for rapid rise in relative sea level, whereas for example changes in oceanic salinity might cause the environment to become deteriorative for the carbonate producers.

One example of a drowned carbonate platform is located in Huon Gulf, Papua New Guinea. It is believed to be drowned by rapid sea level rise caused by deglaciation and subsidence of the platform, which enabled coralline algal-foraminiferal nodules and halimeda limestones to cover the coral reefs.

Plate movements carrying carbonate platforms to latitudes unfavourable for carbonate production are also suggested to be one of the possible reasons for drowning. For example, guyots located in the Pacific Basin between Hawaiian and Mariana Islands are believed to be transported to low southern latitudes (0-10°S) where equatorial upwelling occurred. High amounts of nutrients and higher productivity caused decrease in water transparency and increase in bio-eroders populations, which reduced carbonate accumulation and eventually led to drowning.

=== Highstand shedding ===
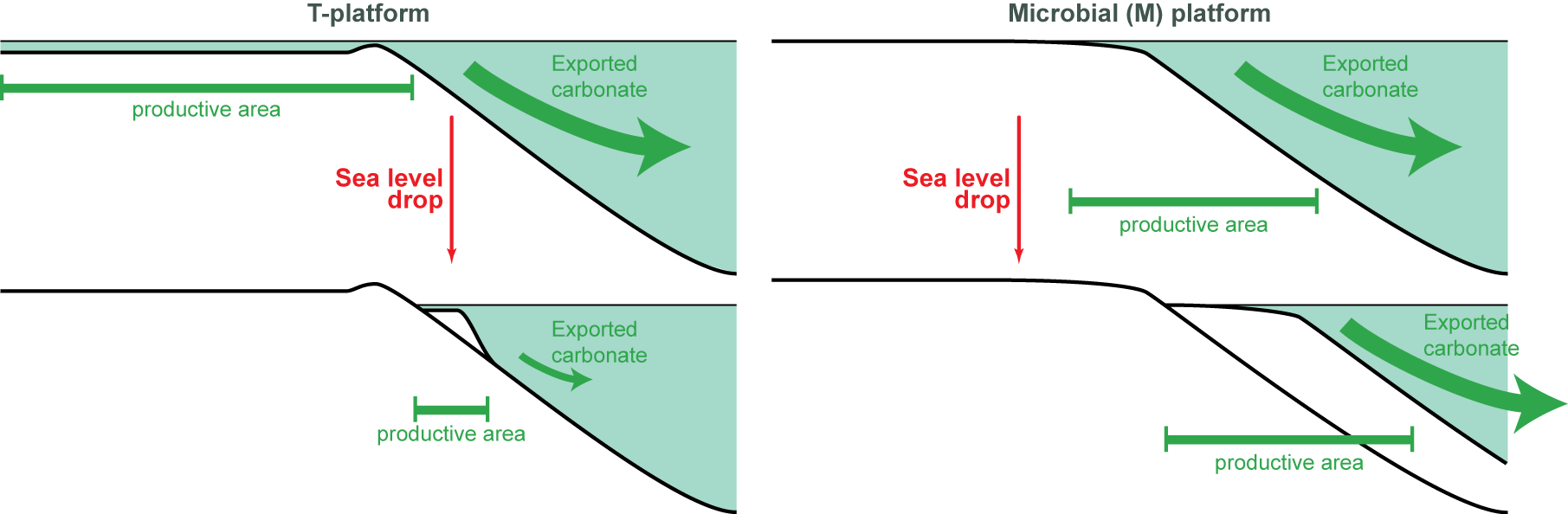
Highstand shedding and slope shedding

Highstand shedding is a process in which a carbonate platform produces and sheds most of the sediments into the adjacent basin during highstands of sea level. This process has been observed on all rimmed carbonate platforms in the Quaternary, such as the Great Bahama Bank. Flat topped, rimmed platforms with steep slopes show more pronounced highstand shedding than platforms with gentle slopes and cool water carbonate systems.

Highstand shedding is pronounced on tropical carbonate platforms because of the combined effect of sediment production and diagenesis. Sediment production of a platform increases with its size, and during highstand the top of the platform is flooded and the productive area is bigger compared to the lowstand conditions, when only a minimal part of the platform is available for production. The effect of increased highstand production is enhanced by the rapid lithification of carbonate during lowstands, because the exposed platform top is karstified rather than eroded, and does not export sediment.

=== Slope shedding ===
Slope shedding is a process typical of microbial platforms, in which the carbonate production is nearly independent from sea level oscillations. The carbonate factory, composed of microbial communities precipitating microbialites, is insensitive to light and can extend from the platform break down the slope to hundreds of meters in depth. Sea level drops of any reasonable amplitude would not significantly affect the slope production areas. Microbial boundstone slope systems are remarkably different from tropical platforms in sediment productions profiles, slope readjustment processes and sediment sourcing. Their progradation is independent from platform sediment shedding and largely driven by slope shedding.

Examples of margins that may be affected of slope shedding that are characterized by various contributions of microbial carbonate growth to the upper slope and margin, are:

- the Canning Basin in Australia
- the Guilin platform in the southern China
- the Permian of the US Permian Basin
- the middle Triassic carbonate platforms of the Dolomites.

== Gallery ==
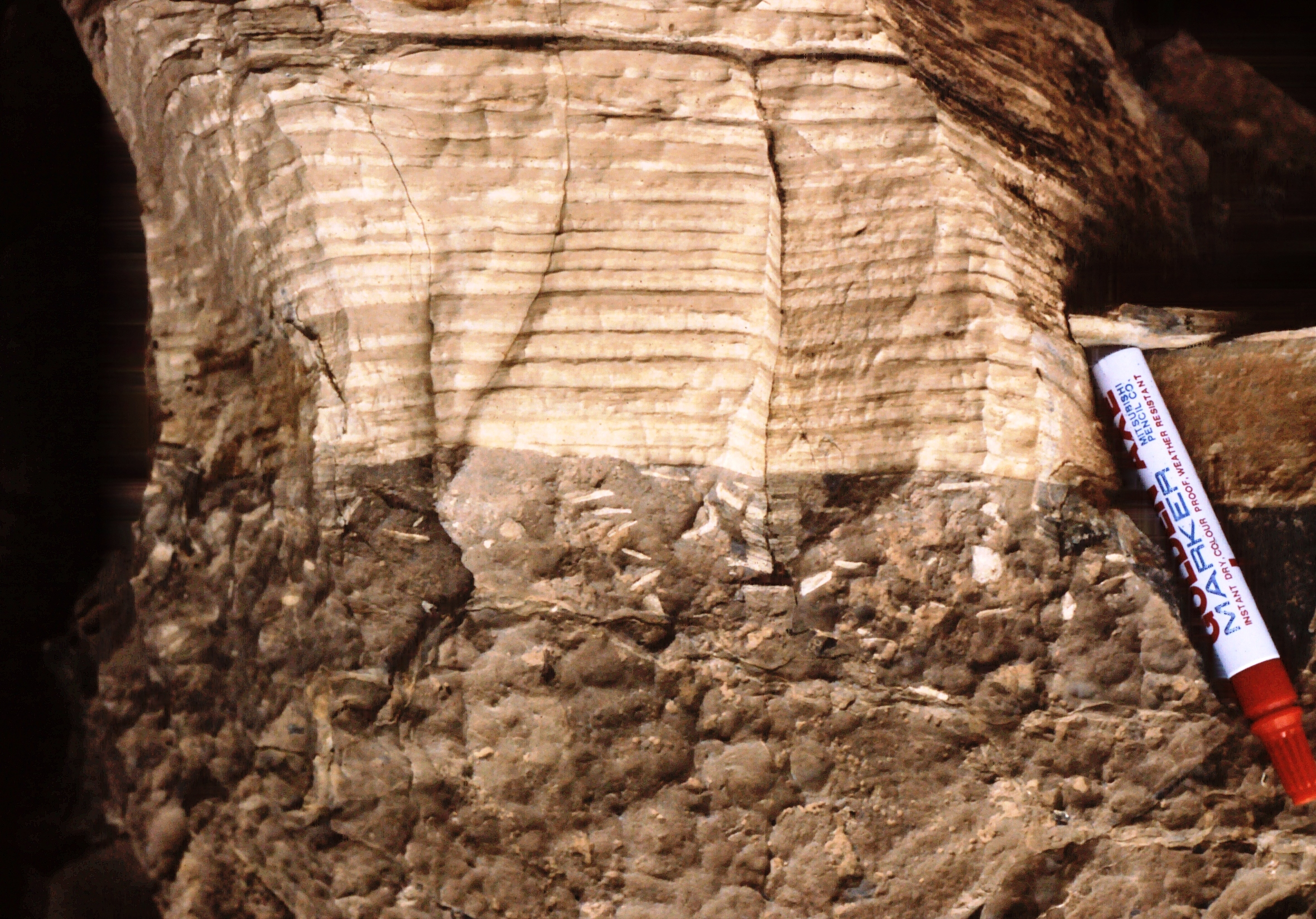
"Shallowing upward" cycle in the Aganane Formation of the high Atlas (Morocco). Algal dolomitized laminations on top.

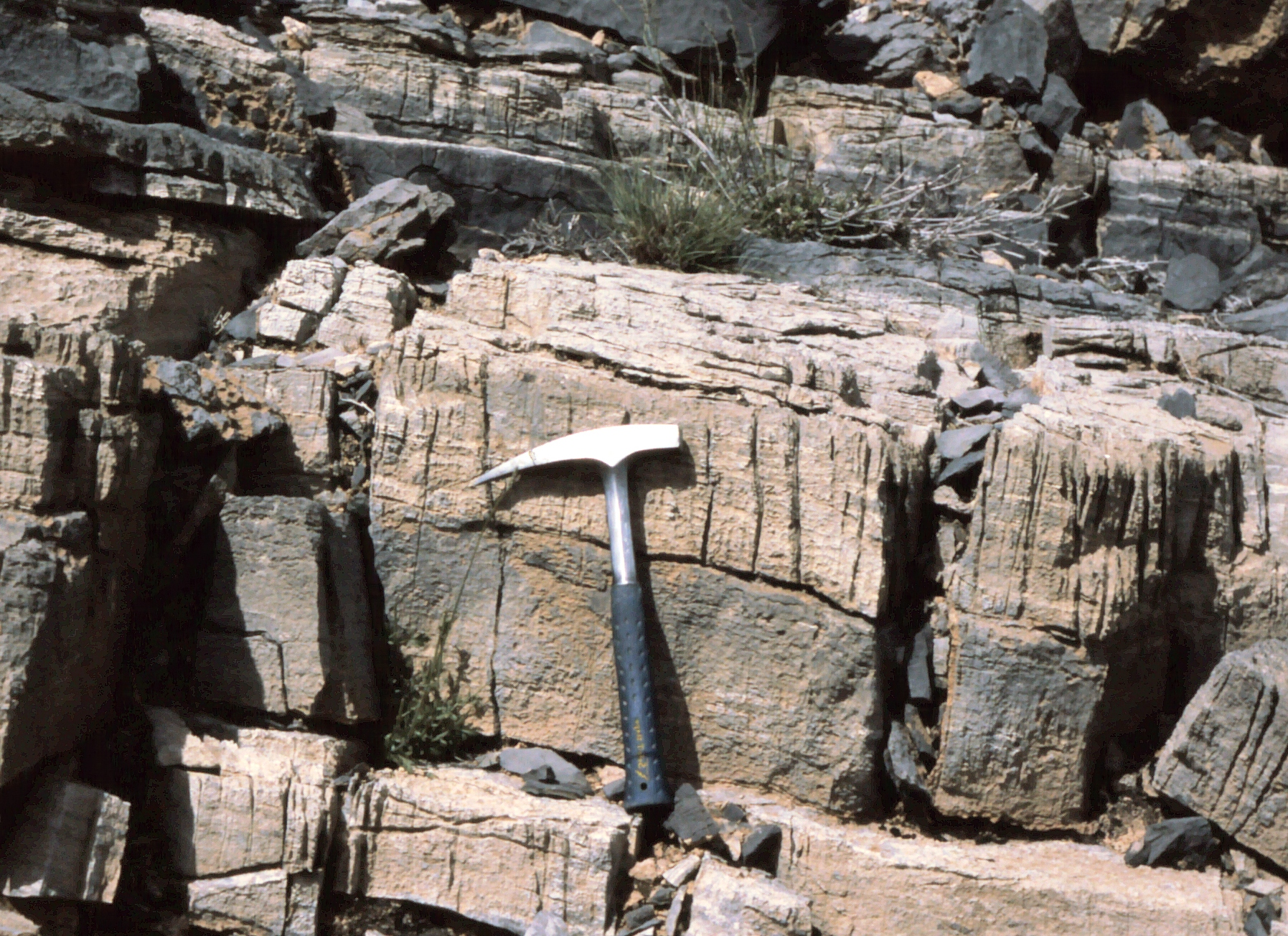
"Shallowing upward" cycles in the lagoonal Lias of the Musandam Peninsula. (N-Oman).

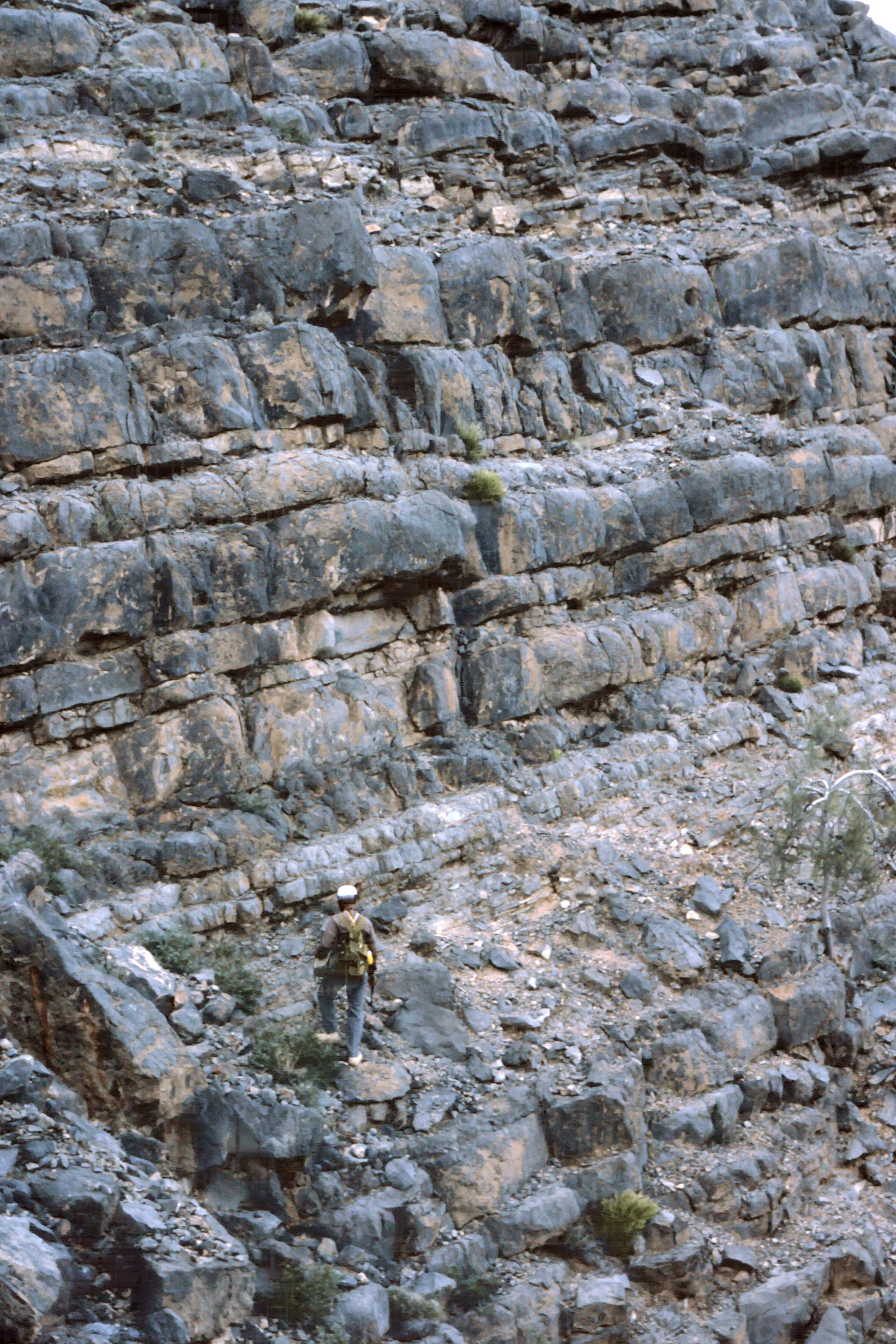
"Shallowing upward" liassic cycles arranged in decametric sequences, Musandam Peninsula, (N-Oman).

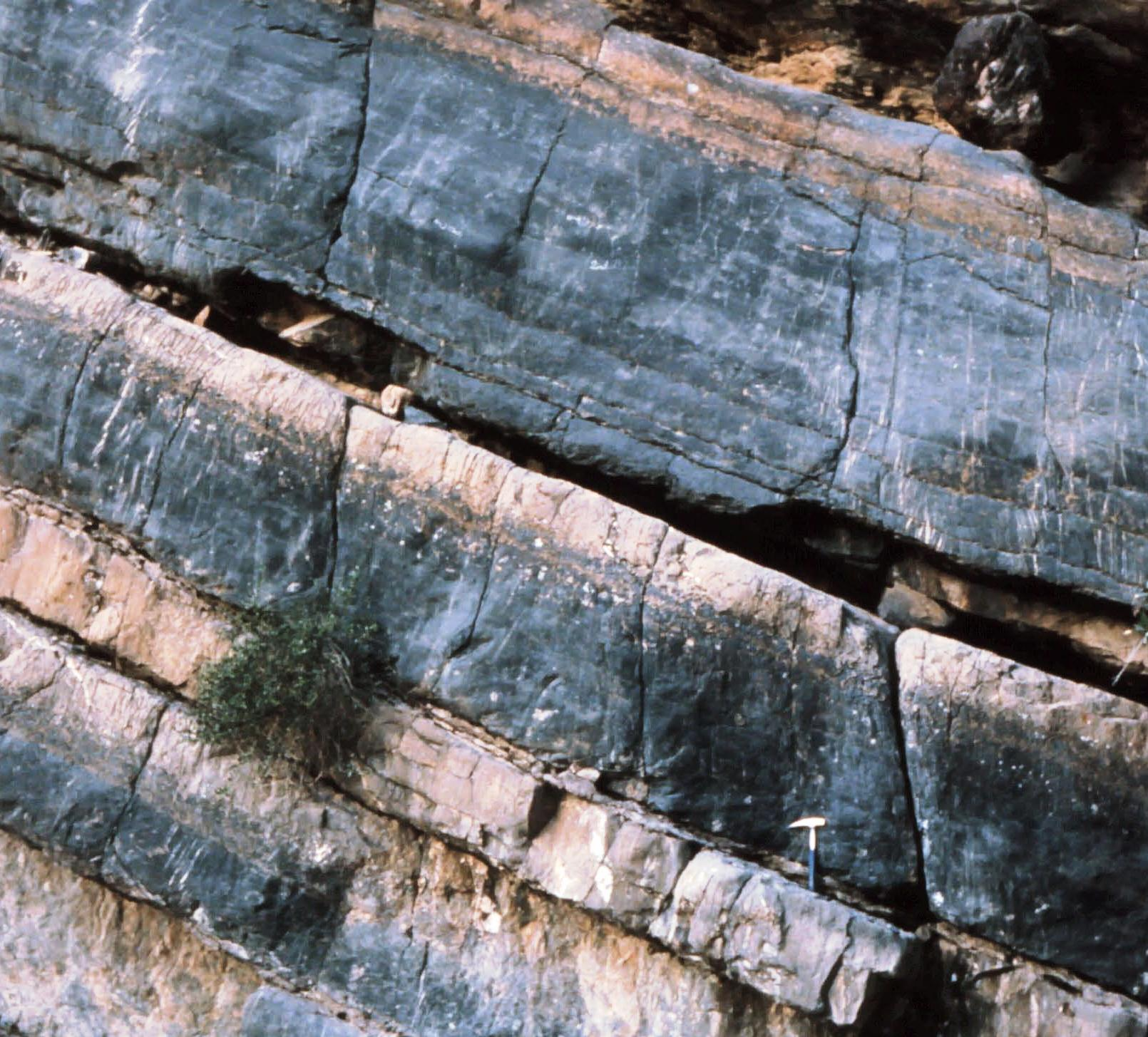
"Shallowing upward" cycle in the Middle Jurassic (Saghtan form.) of the jbel Laghdar Range (Oman).

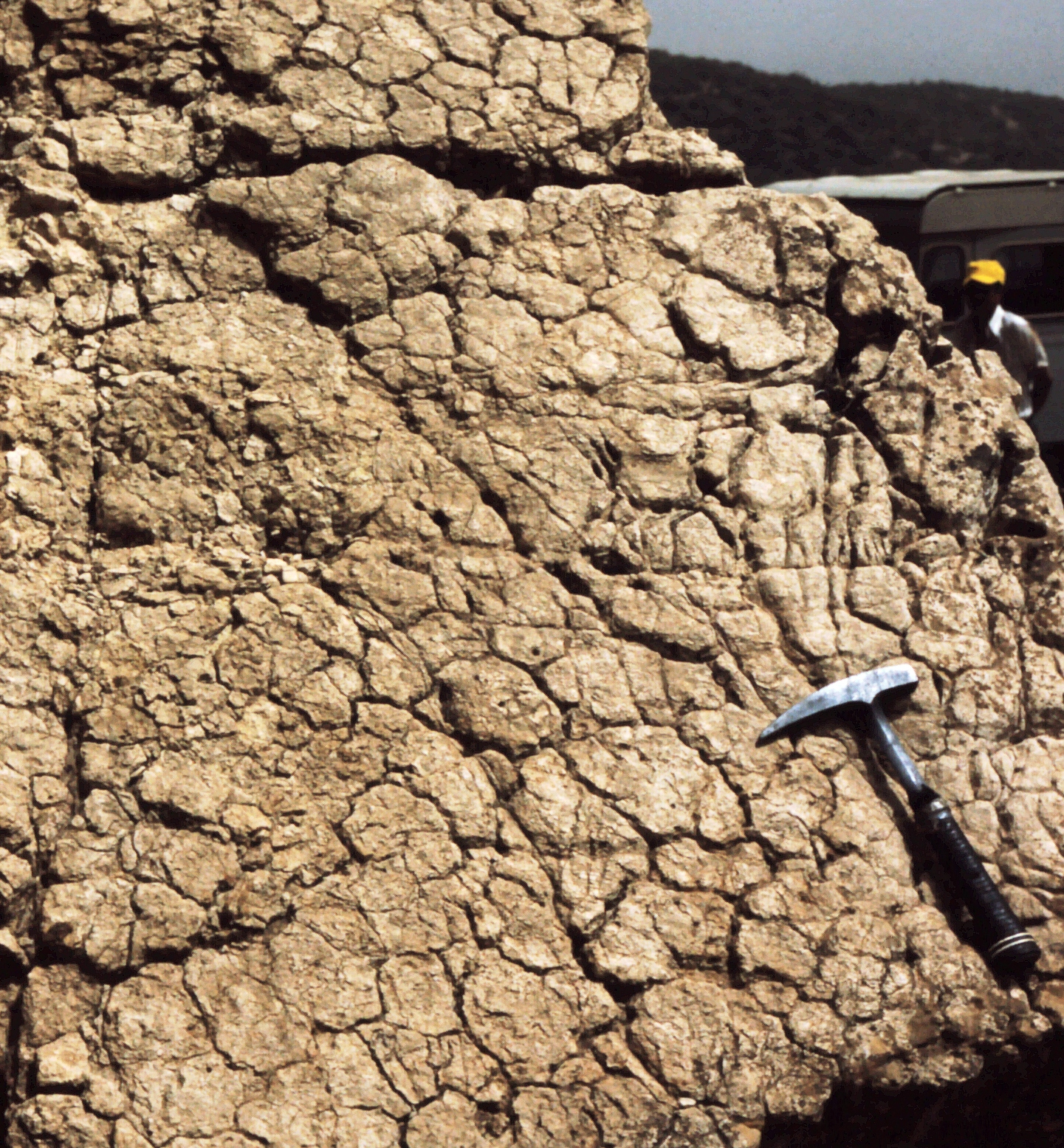
Desiccation figures on top of a regressive sequence; Aganane Formation, High Atlas, Morocco.

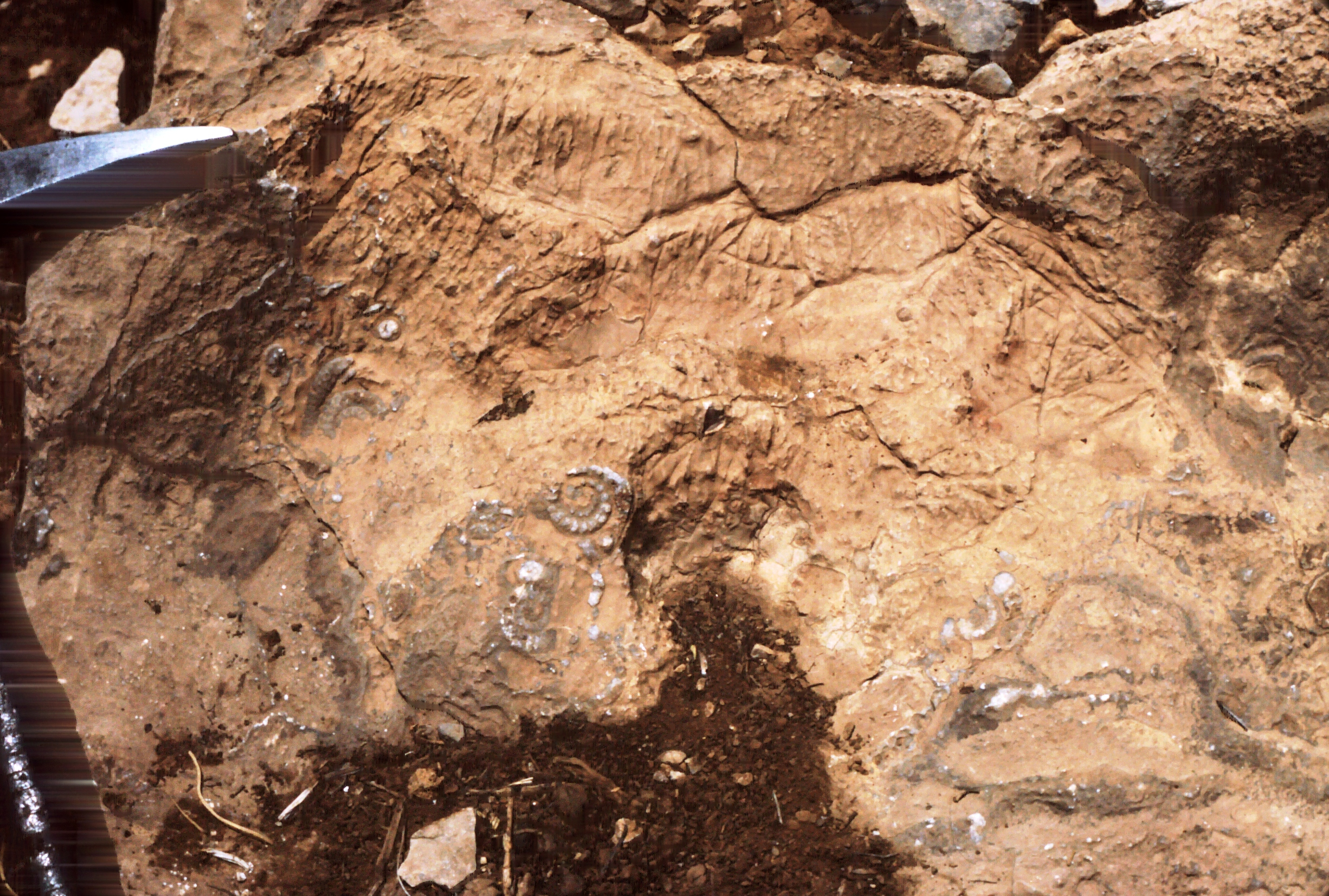
Ammonites and belemnites washed over a supratidal surface (calcretes and "teepees"); Aganane Formation of the High Atlas, Morocco.

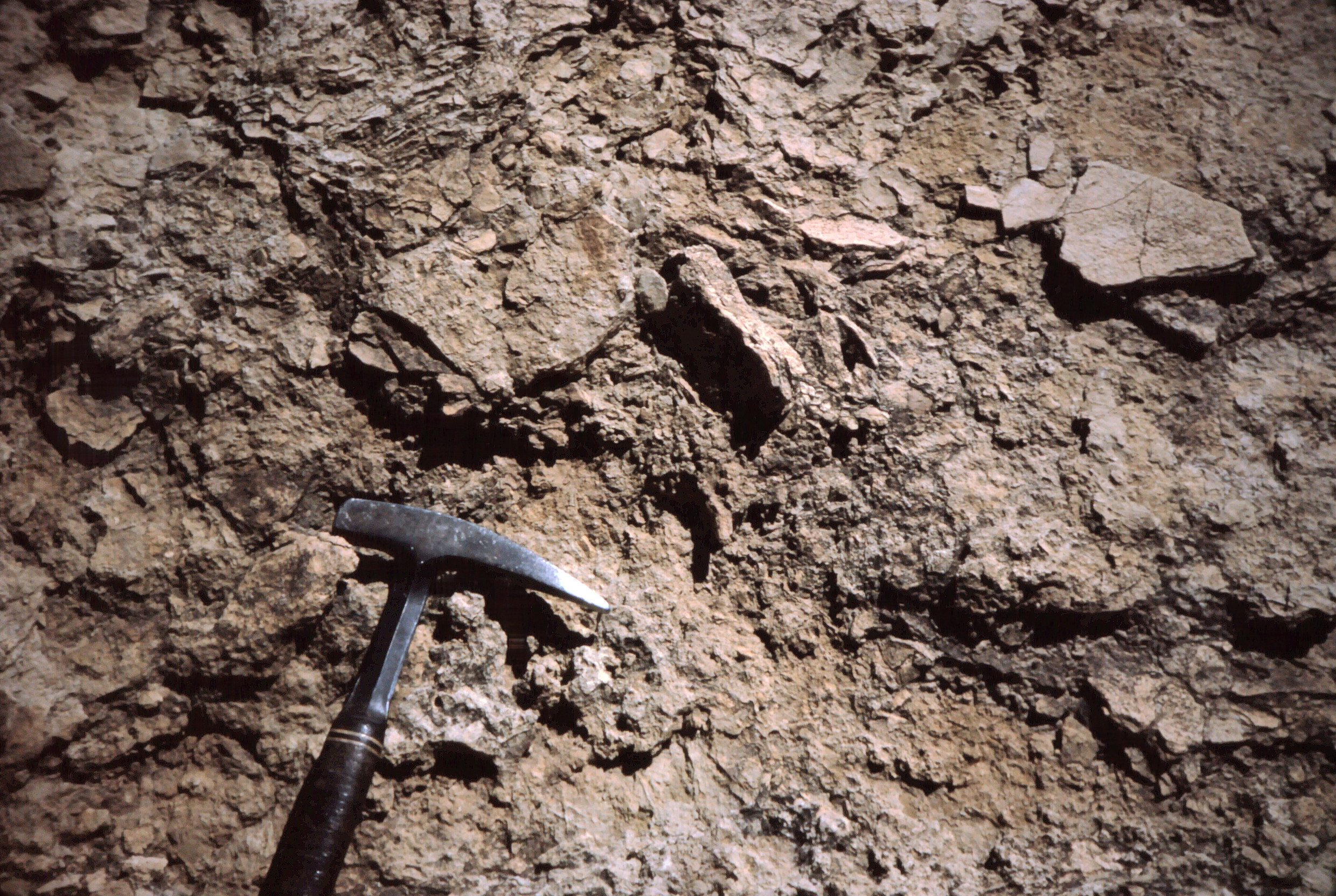
Hurricane breccia cemented (early diagenesis) at the surface of a bed, top of a regressive, metric, sequence. Aganane Formation, High Atlas.

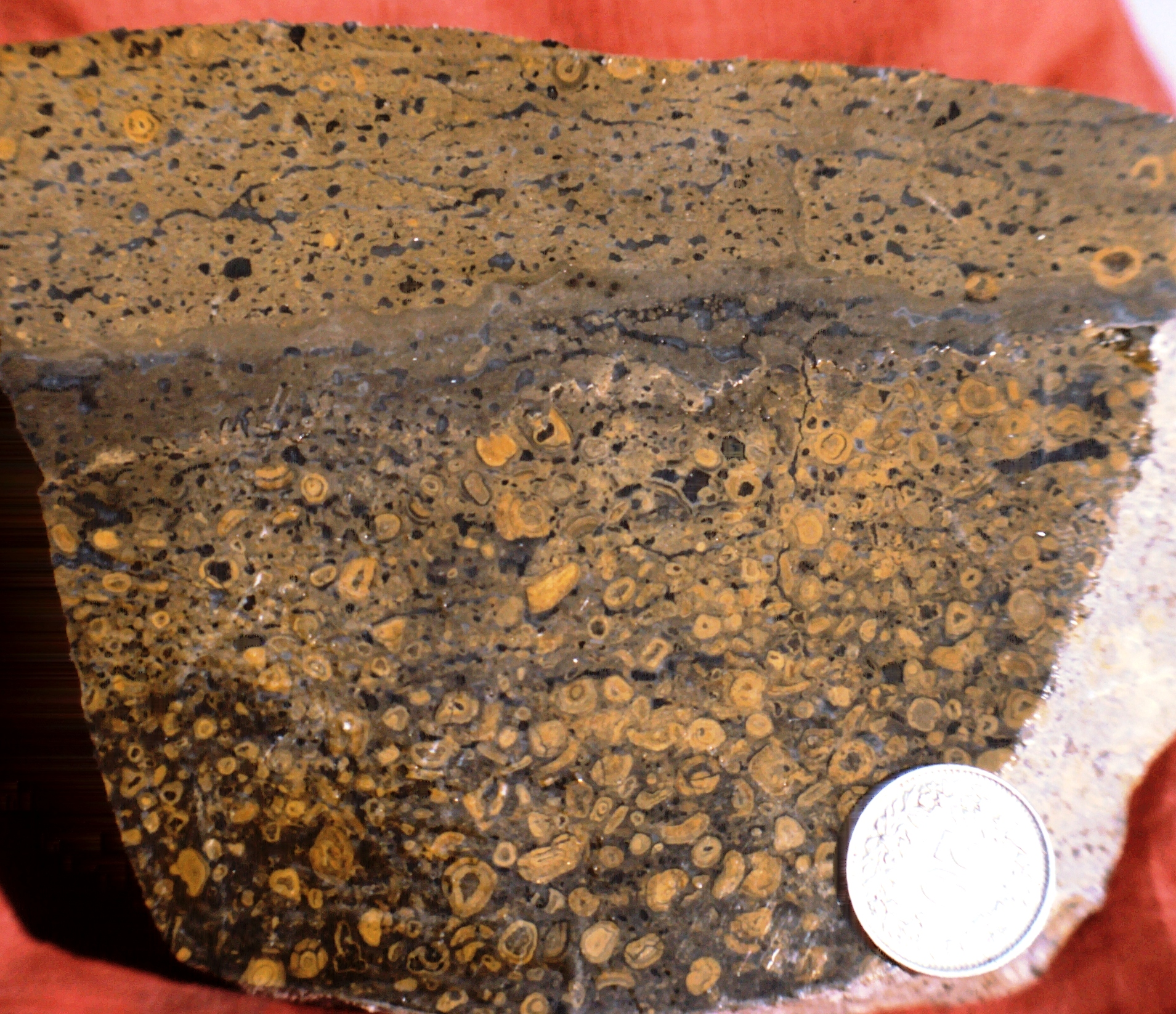
Vadose ferrugenous pisolites (soil) and coastal (tempestite) sediment with birdseyes in an outer platform environment. Aerial diagenesis. Aganane Formation, High Atlas, Morocco.

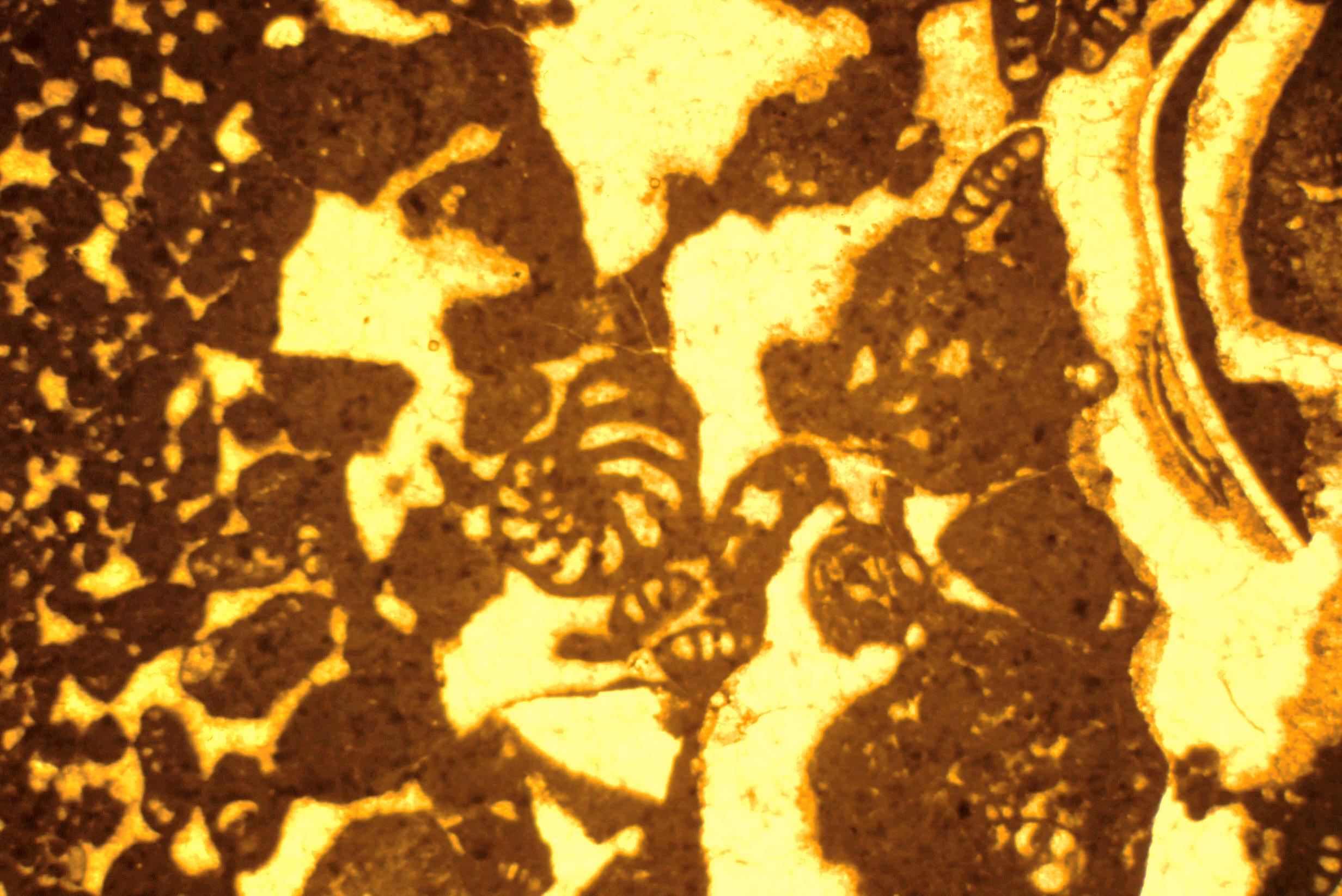
Meniscus and point contact cement in a marine grainstone with displaced foraminifera (by tide and hurricanes) on the supratidal flat of the middle liassic platform of Morocco. Top of emersive cycle. Middle Atlas.

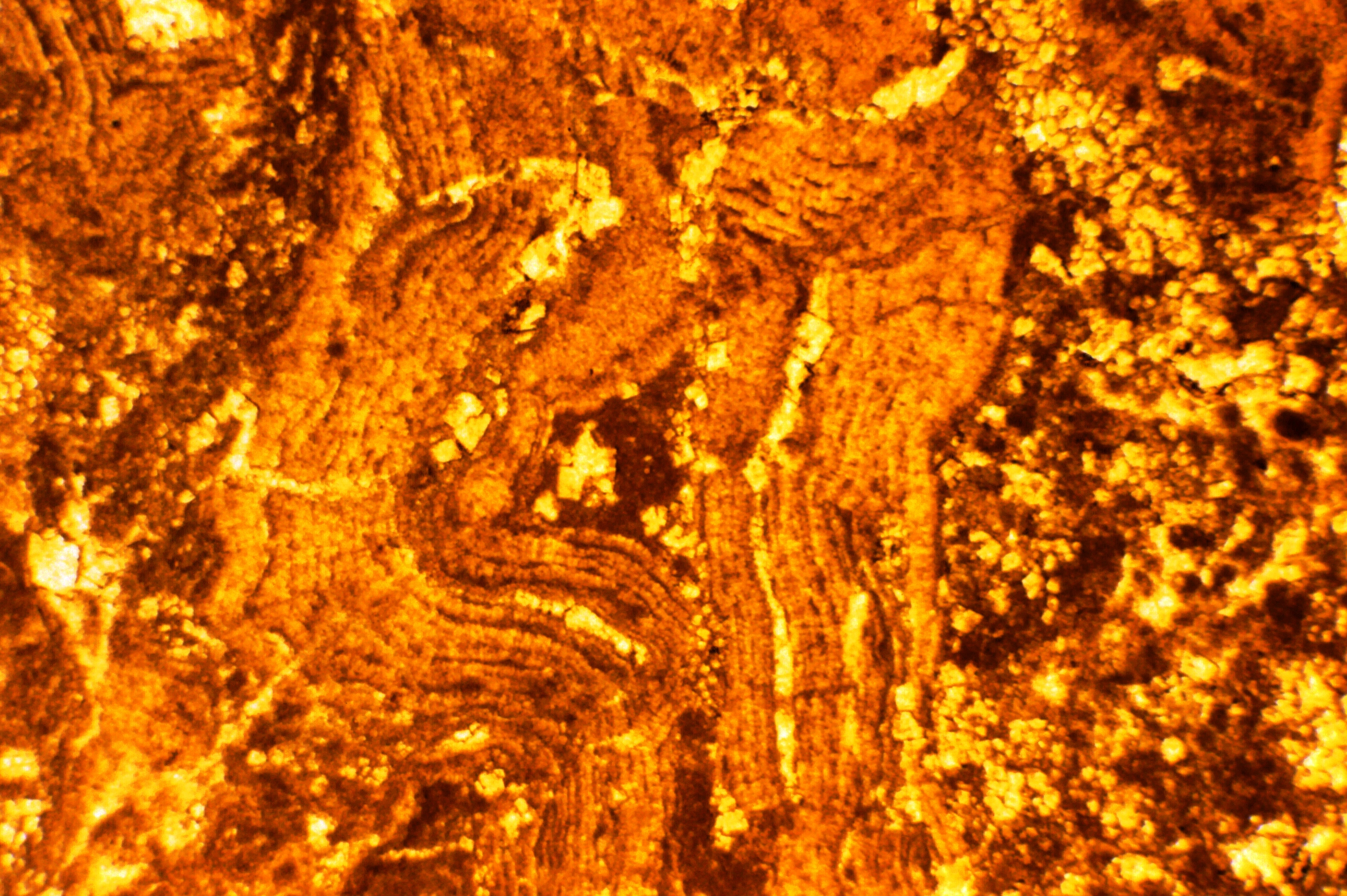
Reworked calcretes concretions from the supratidal environment in a marine (dolomitised) sediment displaced by hurricanes on the inner platform flat. Top of emersive sequence. Aganane Formation, High Atlas, Morocco.

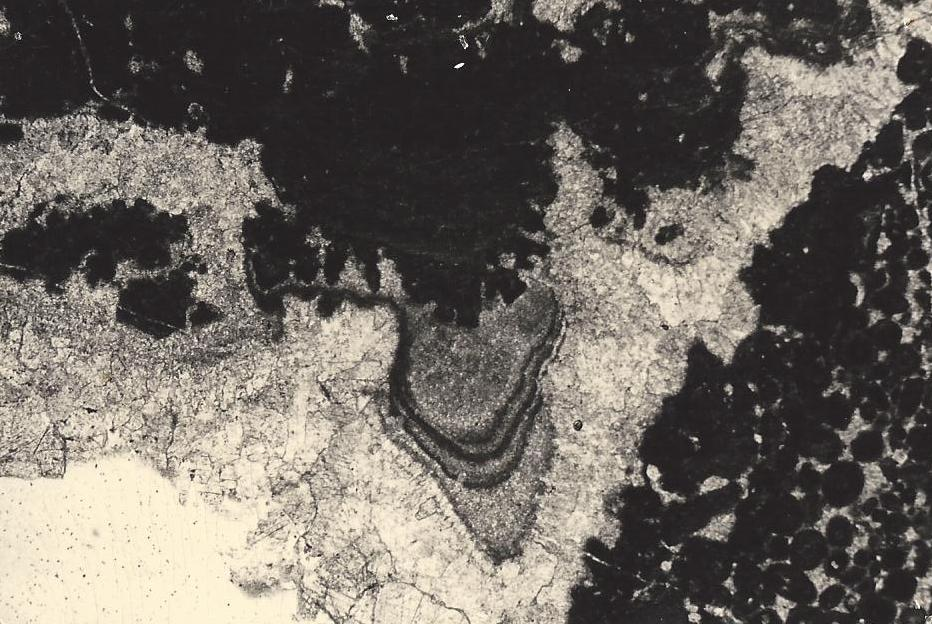
Stalactitic cement in sediment from the supratidal zone, vadose environment, top of "shallowing upward" sequence. Aganane Formation, High Atlas. Thin section. L = 0.3 mm.

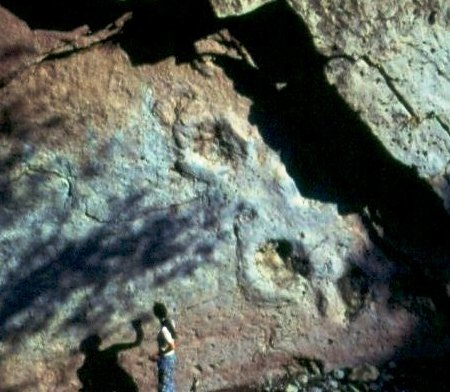
Giant dinosaur tracks (sauropod) on top of a regressive sequence, Aganane Formation, High Atlas, Morocco.

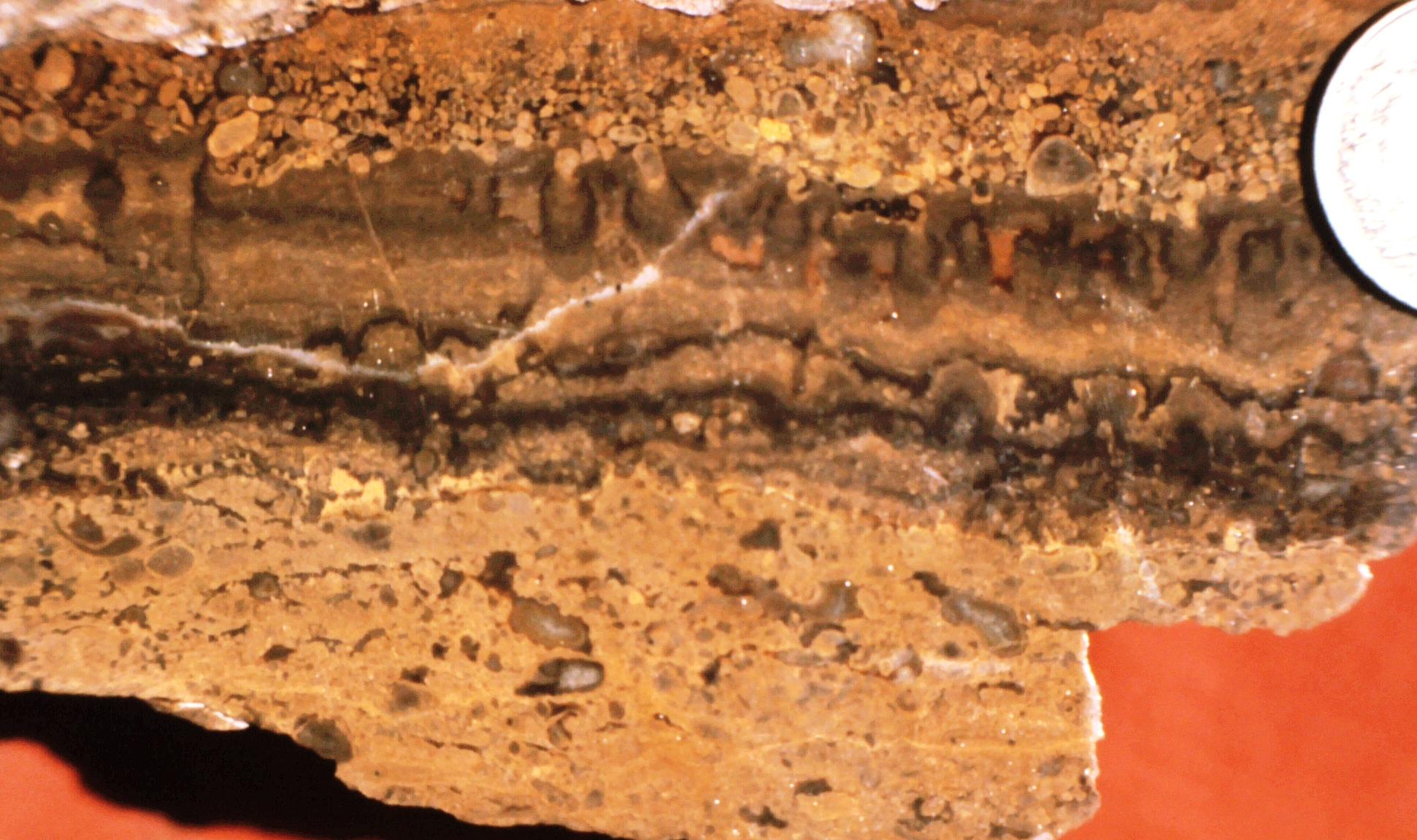
Vadose stalactitic cement filling a horizontal cavity in a marine coastal sediment, outer platform. Birdseyes in the allodapic (tidal or tempestite) grainstone point to an aerial diagenesis. Aganane Formation, High Atlas, Morocco.

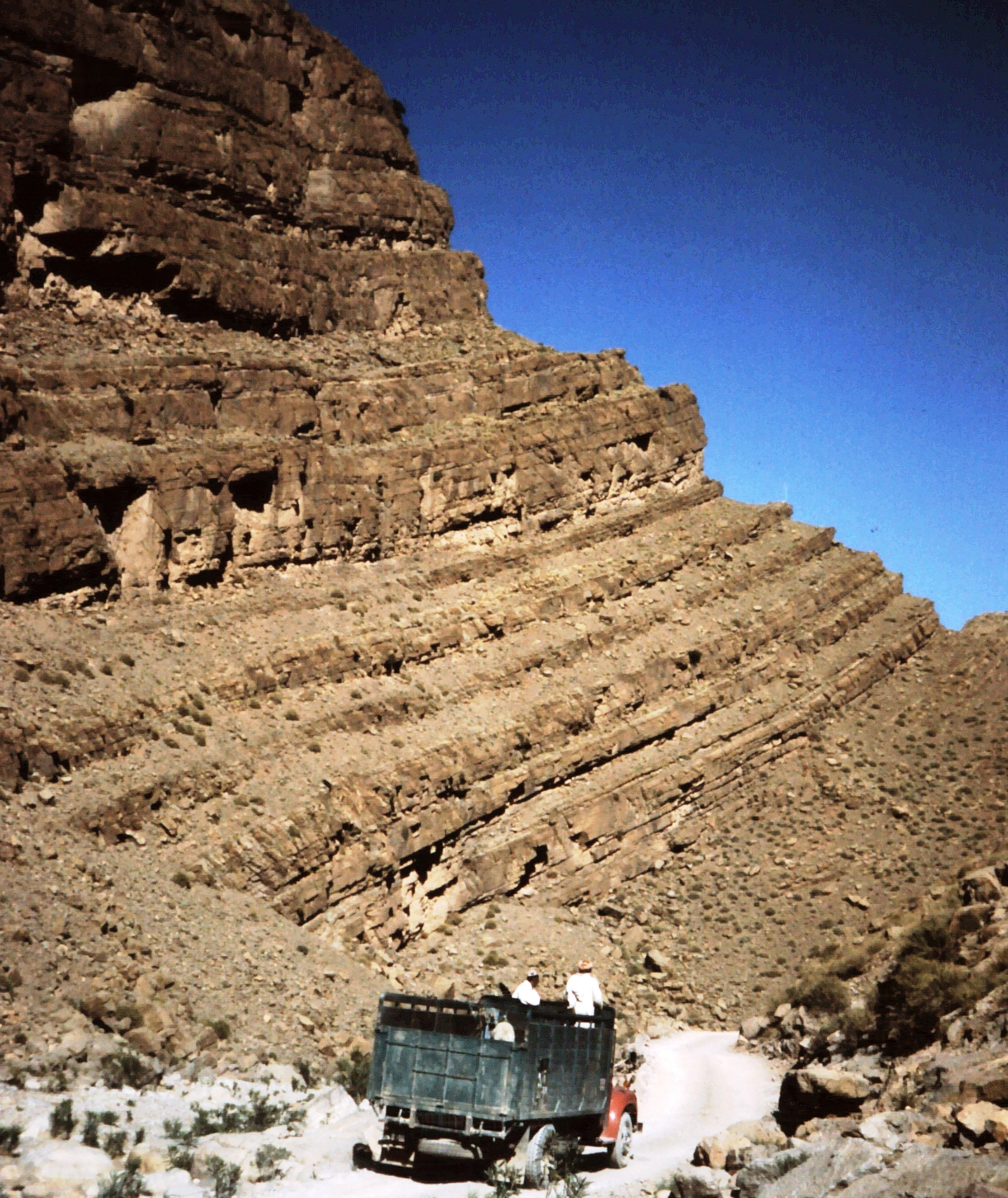
Autocyclic filling (metric to hectometric) sequences in the Middle Liassic lagoon, South (Todhra) of the Aganane Formation, High Atlas, Morocco.

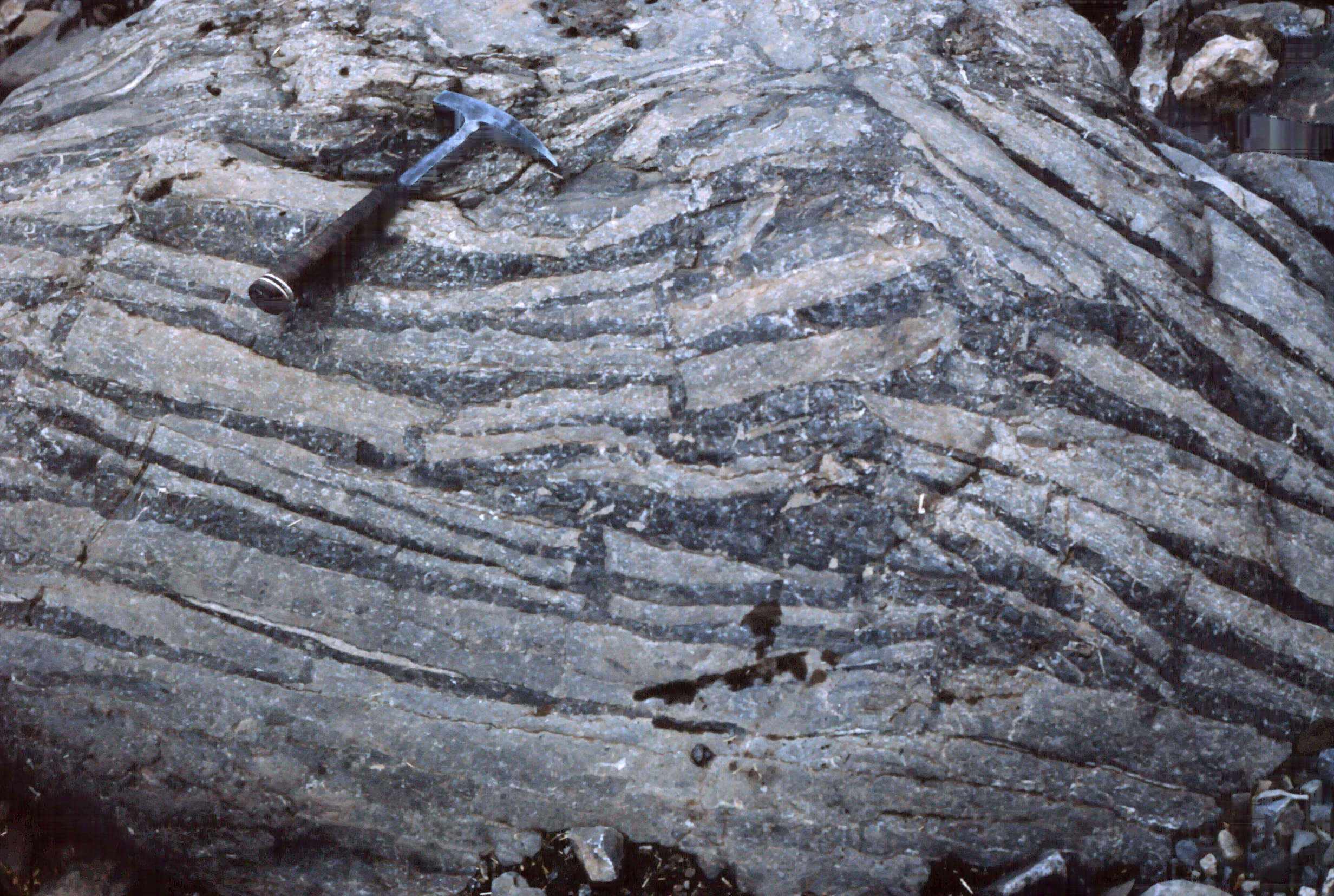
"Teepee" structure, due to increasing sediment volume by dolomitisation on the inner platform supratidal flat. Top of emersive cycle. Middle Lias, Aganane Formation, High Atlas.

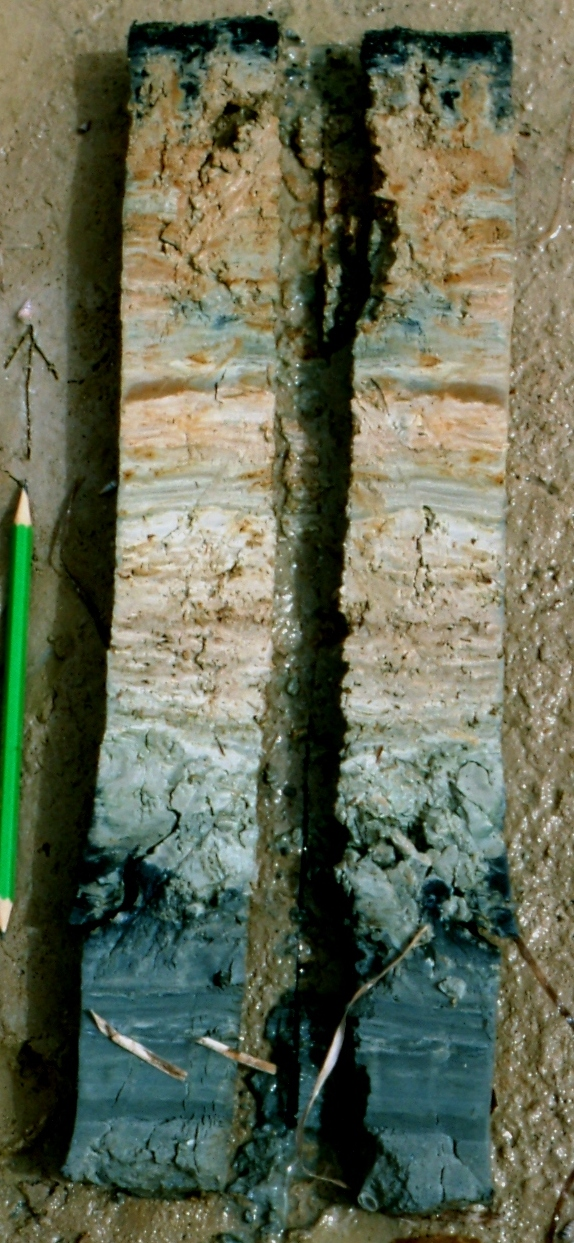
Quaternary to recent equivalent of a "shallowing upward sequence", cores in a Tunisian "chott", intertidal laminations in yellow.

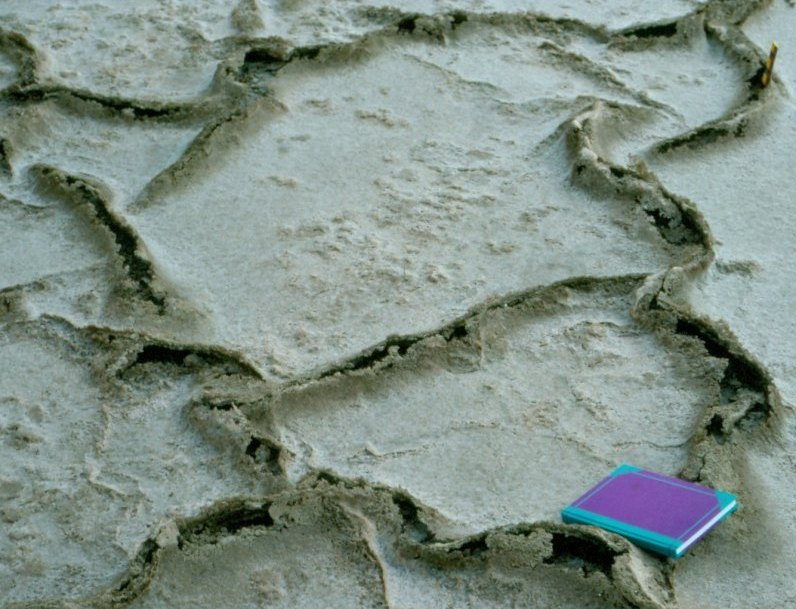
Recent "teepee" structures in a Tunisian salt lagoon, "chott".

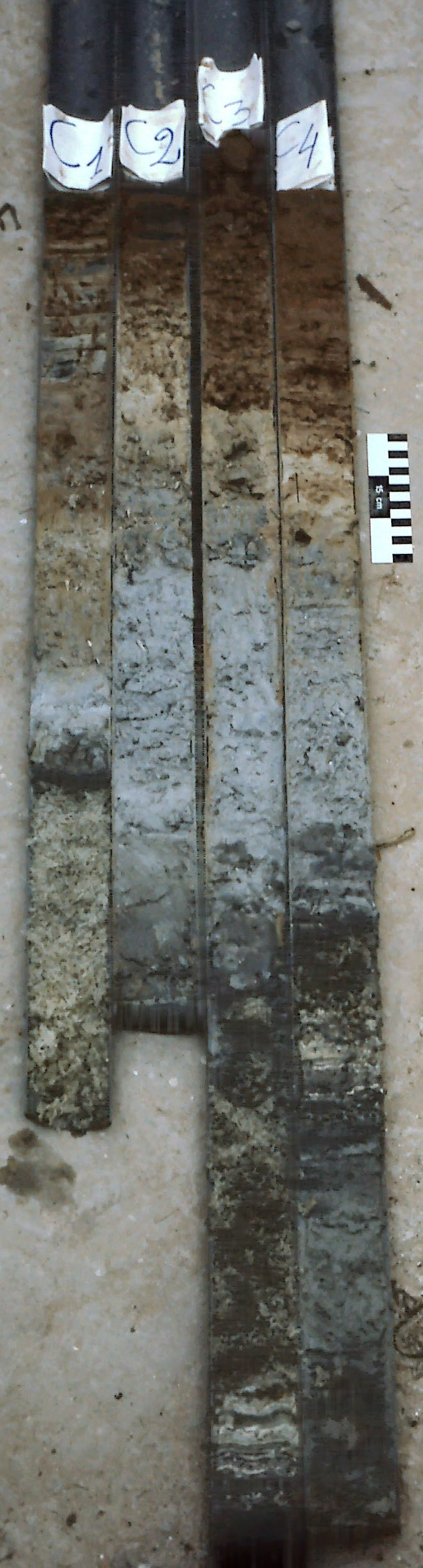
Recent equivalents of "shallowing upward sequences", cores in a Tunisian salt lagoon, "chott".

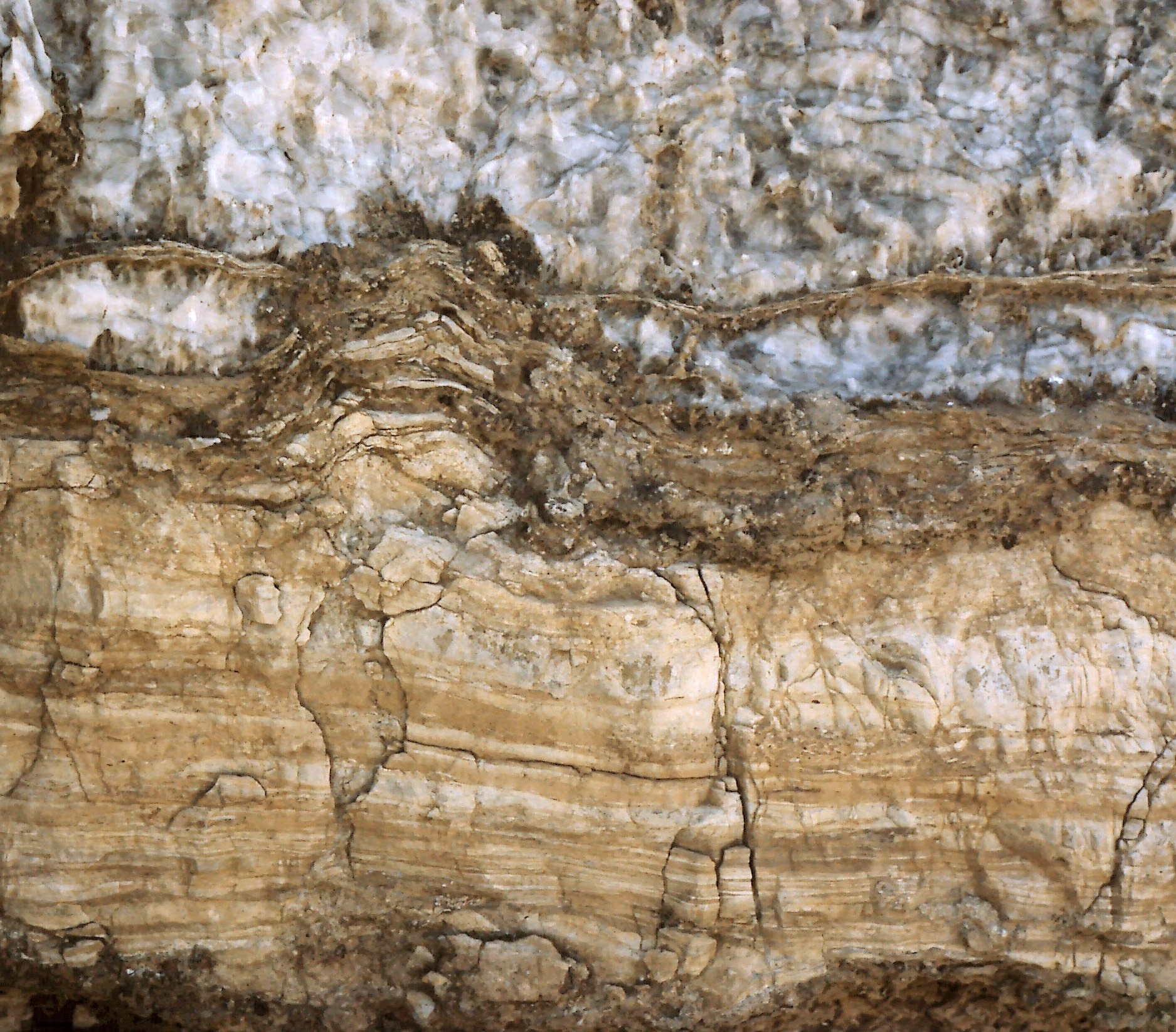
Top of a regressive sequence with algal laminations (yellow) and crystallised gypsum, salt lagoon "chott", Tunisia.

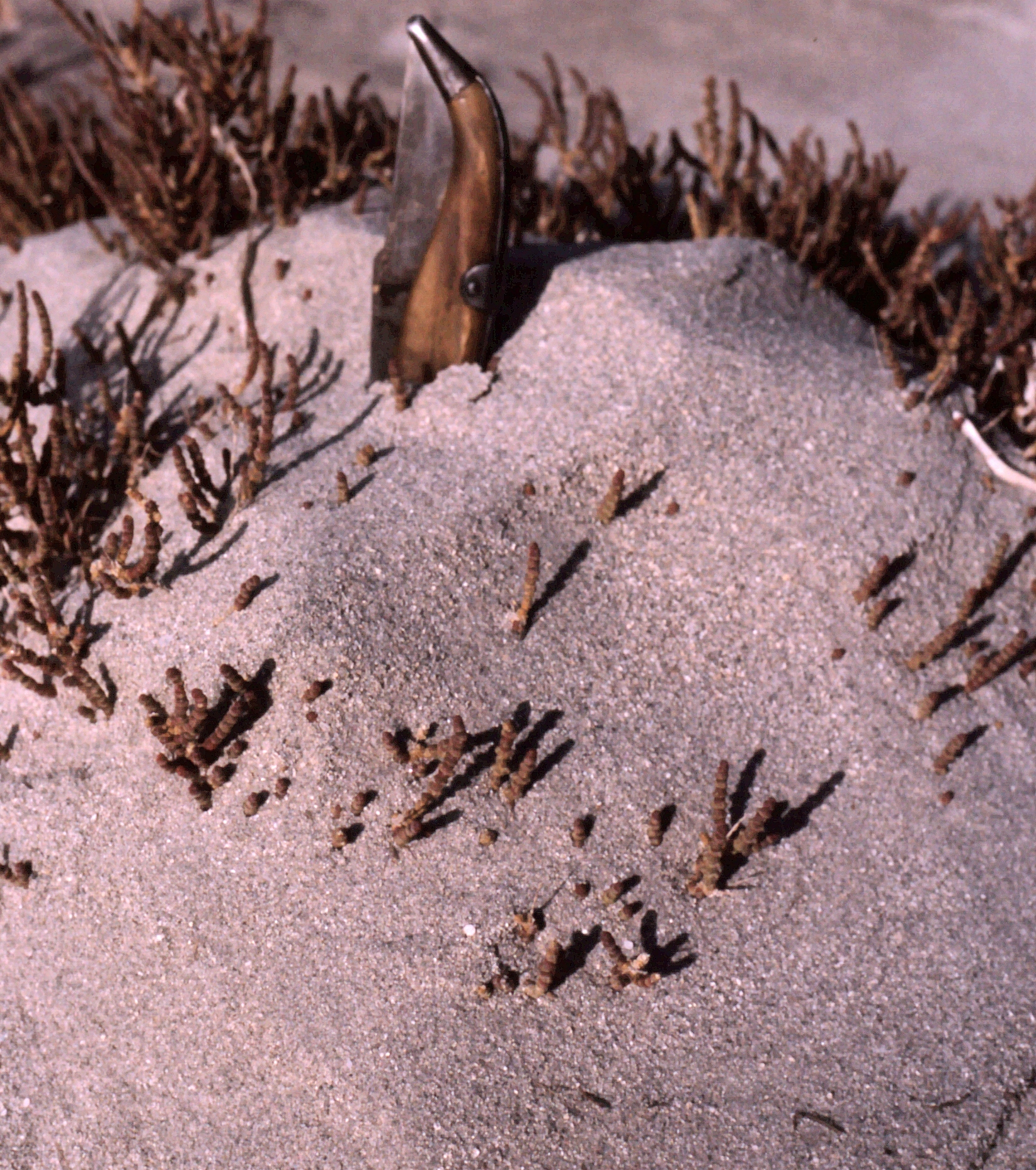
Eolian bioclastic (calcareous algae and porcellaneous foraminifera) sand dune on Tunisian shore.

== See also ==
- Ocean bank (topography)
- Bahama Banks
