= Çukurpınar, Afşin =

Çukurpinar
- Neighbourhood
- Location in Turkey
- Coordinates: 38.299°N 36.771°E
- Country: Turkey
- Province: Kahramanmaraş
- District: Afşin
- Population (2022): 199
- Time zone: UTC+3 (TRT)
- Postal code: 46500
- Area code: 0344

Çukurpinar (former Küçüksevin) is a neighbourhood of the municipality and district of Afşin, Kahramanmaraş Province, Turkey. Its population is 199 (2022).
