= Automicrite =

Limestone constituent

Automicrite is autochthonous micrite, that is, a carbonate mud precipitated in situ (no transporting) and made up of fine-grained calcite or aragonite micron-sized crystals. It precipitates on the sea floor or within the sediment as an authigenic mud thanks to physicochemical, microbial, photosynthetic and biochemical processes. It has peculiar fabrics and uniform mineralogical and chemical composition.

== Environments where automicrite is formed ==
Automicrite deposits are found in different environments, as lakes, tidal flats, or the aphotic zone of marine slopes and basins. However, the environment where automicrite is most common is in carbonate mud mounds, a type of carbonate platform. In this kind of carbonate platform, common in the geological past but nearly absent today, automicrite deposits made carbonate structures of many tens to hundreds of metres of relief called "mud mounds". Automicritic mud mounds seemed to form more easily in areas of low sedimentation rate of siliciclastic extrabasinal sediment.

Usually, the presence of mud in sedimentary rocks is an indicator of low-energy conditions in a depositional system, so in high-energy conditions it is nearly impossible to find mud. Instead, automicrite can precipitate internally in cavities and sediment pores below the sediment–water interface, also in sediments that are formed in high-energy condition. Automicrite can also crystallize in suspension within cavities and then deposit on the cavity bottom. Usually, this process forms peloids, a kind of carbonate grains make by automicrite.

== Features ==
In present carbonate platforms, automicrite is composed by aragonite needle-shaped crystals which have dimension of 1- 5 μm. Instead, in old limestones micrite is composed by μm-size calcite crystals.

== Formation ==
Knowledge of the automicrites generation processes allow to make paleo-environmental interpretations, so it can become good instrument for basin analysis. Carbonate mud or micrite may originate through several processes, including the abiotic precipitation from highly supersaturated seawater or precipitation induced by microbial activity.

=== 1. Abiotic micrites precipitation ===
There are two kinds of “inorganic” micrite:

- Internal micrite which precipitates inside cavities and inter-granular pores of sediments. It is a pore-filling micrite which has peloidal or clotted textures, and when it is found in limestones it may prove that marine lithification occurred.

- Seafloor micrite which precipitates at the sediment–water interface.

The equilibrium relationship for $\ce{CO2, CaCO3}$in water is:

$\ce{H2O + CO2 + CaCO3 (solid) <-> Ca2+ (aq) + 2HCO3- (aq)}$

Through temperature increase, pressure decrease, or a decrease in pH, the loss of $\ce{CO2}$makes the reaction shift to the left. While $\ce{CaCO3}$should precipitate spontaneously from seawater, which is supersaturated with respect to calcium carbonate, calcite precipitation is inhibited by the presence of Mg in seawater and aragonite crystallization is inhibited by organophosphatic molecules. In modern environments, carbonate mud seems to form spontaneously in seawater in whitings.

Whitings are clouds of suspended carbonate crystals (aragonite and Mg-calcite) that make the sea white. This phenomenon is common in tropically environments such as the Great Bahama Bank. Some attribute the formation of whitings to resuspension of carbonate sediment from sea bottom by waves.

=== 2. Precipitation induced by microbial activity ===
Precipitation of carbonate mud from seawater may be triggered by biological activity as photosynthesis. In fact, the metabolism of some organisms remove dissolved CO_{2} from seawater and thus promotes the precipitation of carbonate. In present sedimentary environments, the production of carbonate mud by cyanobacteria is known to occur in peritidal environments (Bahamas, Florida Bay, Persian Gulf) and in highly saline lakes (Coorong, Australia; Lake Tanganyika, eastern Africa). In this process is relevant the rule of filamentous cyanobacteria, in fact the calcite crystals formed within the organic filaments of cyanobacteria are retained after the death of the organism and consequently end up in the formation of layered carbonate mud rocks, the stromatolites. Micritic rocks of the geological past, e.g., the stromatolites of the Late Triassic Hauptdolomit of the Alps, may have had a similar origin. In many Jurassic micritic and peloidal limestones, remains of benthic coccoid cyanobacterial mats have been found.

Also bacterial sulfate reduction may promote carbonate mud precipitation from seawater. Bacterial sulfate reduction may be represented by the simplified reaction:

2CH + SO_{4}^{2−} → HCO_{3}^{−} + HS^{−} + H_{2}O

This process has the potential to promote precipitation by producing hydrogen carbonate ions, which are one of the reactants in the precipitation of carbonate from seawater.
