= Relative sea level =

Sea level measured relative to a land based reference frame

Relative sea level (RSL) is defined as the sea level that is observed with respect to a land-based reference frame. It is often contrasted with eustatic sea level, which is a measure of the total mass or volume of the oceans. Relative sea level can change by the processes changing eustatic sea level (e.g., ice melt and thermal expansion), but also by changes on land such as subsidence and isostatic rebound.

In sequence stratigraphy, relative sea level is similarly defined as the distance from the ocean surface to the bottom of the sediment on the ocean floor. Therefore, relative sea level is independent of the thickness of the sediment layer at the bottom of the ocean, which makes it a different concept than water depth.
