= Binboğa, Afşin =

Binboğa
- Neighbourhood
- Location in Turkey
- Coordinates: 38.288938°N 36.74186°E
- Country: Turkey
- Province: Kahramanmaraş
- District: Afşin
- Population (2022): 231
- Time zone: UTC+3 (TRT)
- Postal code: 46500
- Area code: 0344

Binboğa is a neighbourhood of the municipality and district of Afşin, Kahramanmaraş Province, Turkey. Its population is 231 (2022), decreasing from 303 in 2010.

Binboğa is located on the eastern side of Binboğa Mountains, 15.8 km (9.8 mi) west-northwest of Afşin and 80.8 km (50.2 mi) north-northwest of Kahramanmaraş.
