= Graellsia (plant) =

Scientific classification
- Kingdom: Plantae
- Clade: Tracheophytes
- Clade: Angiosperms
- Clade: Eudicots
- Clade: Rosids
- Order: Brassicales
- Family: Brassicaceae
- Genus: Graellsia; Boiss.

Synonyms
- Physalidium Fenzl

Species of plant in the family Brassicaceae

Graellsia is a genus of small perennial sub-caespitose herbs in the family Brassicaceae. Most of the species are found in Iran and Afghanistan, with one occurring in Turkey, and one in the High Atlas of Morocco. They are typically found in shady crevices of calcareous rocks at elevations of 1,000–3,600 metres (3,300–11,800 ft).

The genus was erected in 1842 by Pierre Edmond Boissier, commemorating the Spanish zoologist Mariano de la Paz Graells y de la Agüera. It initially contained only Graellsia saxifragifolia, which had previously been placed in Cochlearia. New species were gradually added, and G. hederifolia was moved to Graellsia, having previously been the only species in Draba sect. Helicodraba. Subsequent investigations using molecular phylogenetics have questioned the grouping of G. hederifolia and G. saxifraga, and G. hederifolia may need to be restored to the genus Draba.

== Species ==
Ten species are accepted.

- Graellsia chitralensis O.E.Schulz
- Graellsia davisiana Poulter
- Graellsia graellsiifolia (Lipsky) Poulter
- Graellsia hederifolia (Coss.) R.D.Hyam & Jury
- Graellsia hissarica Junussov
- Graellsia integrifolia (Rech.f.) Rech.f.
- Graellsia isfahan Esmailbegi & Al-Shehbaz
- Graellsia longistyla (Poulter) Esmailbegi & Al-Shehbaz
- Graellsia saxifragifolia (DC.) Boiss.
- Graellsia stylosa (Boiss. & Hohen.) Poulter
