= Afşin =

- District and municipality
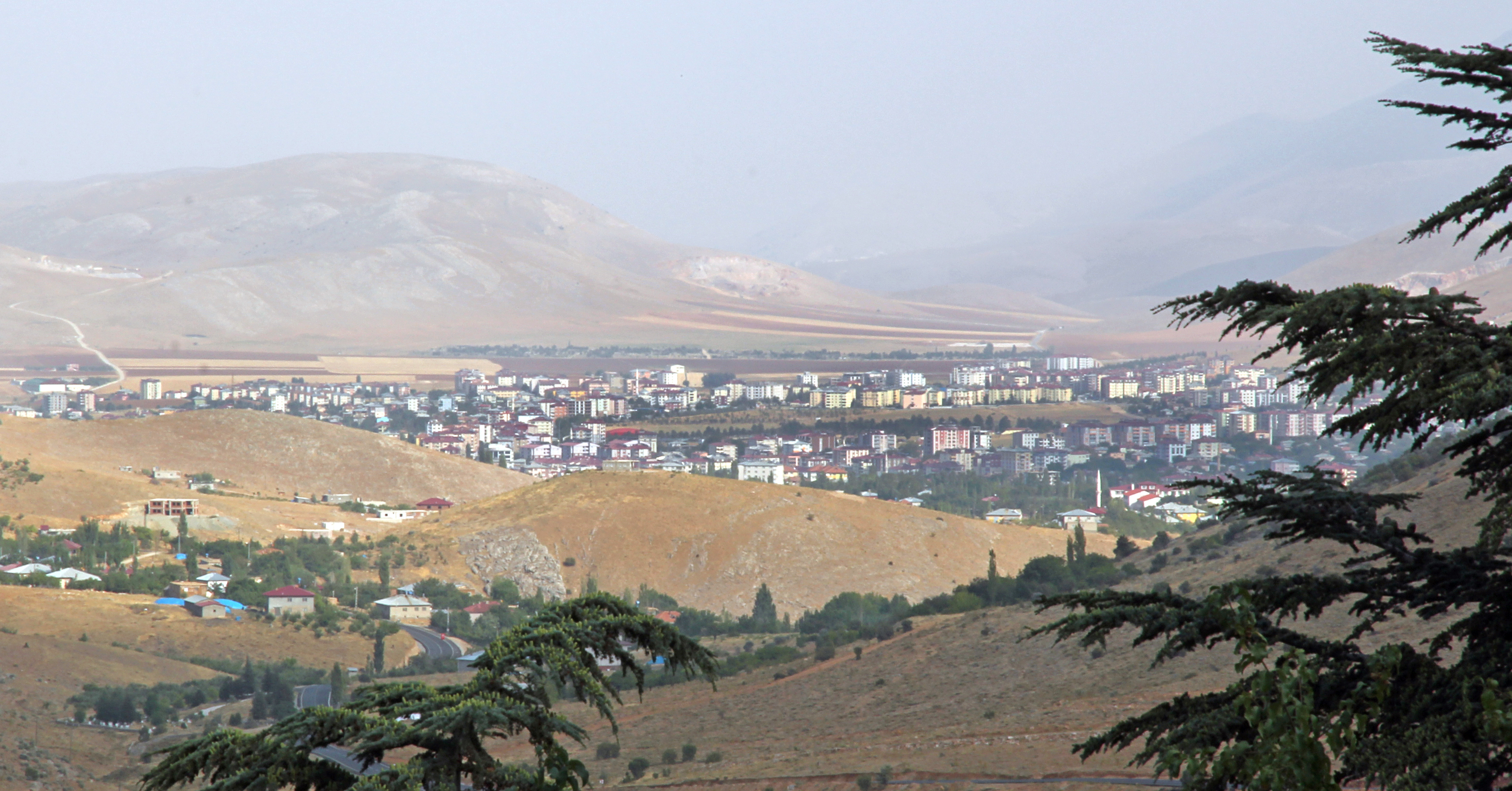

- Logo

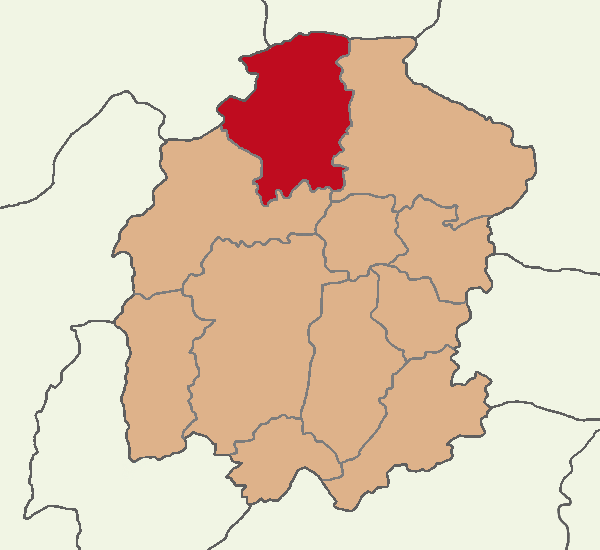
- Map showing Afşin District in Kahramanmaraş Province

- Location within Turkey
- Coordinates: 38°14′47″N 36°55′7″E
- Country: Turkey
- Province: Kahramanmaraş

Government
  - Mayor: Koray Kiraç (AKP)
- Area: 1,502 km^{2} (580 sq mi)
- Elevation: 1,230 m (4,040 ft)
- Population (2022): 80,044
  - Density: 53.29/km^{2} (138.0/sq mi)
- Time zone: UTC+3 (TRT)
- Postal code: 46500
- Area code: 0344
- Website: www.afsin.bel.tr

Afşin is a municipality and district of Kahramanmaraş Province, Turkey. Its area is 1,502 km^{2}, and its population is 80,044 (2022).

It is the location of the ancient town Arabissus. Afşin should not be confused with Gülşehir, also described in some sources as Arabissus, but whose earlier names Arapsun and Yarapson likely derive instead from the ancient Tripotamos.

== Afşin-Elbistan power stations ==
Two coal fired power stations are operational and are said to be damaging health via air pollution.

== Composition ==
There are 66 neighbourhoods in Afşin District:

- Afşinbey
- Ağcaşar
- Alemdar
- Alimpınar
- Alpaslan
- Altaş
- Altunelma
- Anzorey
- Arıtaş
- Armutalanı
- Bakraç
- Başüstü
- Berçenek
- Beyceğiz
- Binboğa
- Büget
- Büyüksevin
- Büyüktatlı
- Çağulhan
- Çobanbeyli
- Çoğulhan
- Çomudüz
- Çukurpınar
- Dedebaba
- Deveboynu
- Dokuztay
- Efsuzturan
- Emirilyas
- Emirli
- Erçene
- Esence
- Gaziosmanpaşa
- Gerger
- Gözpınarı
- Haticepınar
- Hurman
- Hüyüklü
- İğdemlik
- İnciköy
- İncirli
- Kabaağaç
- Kale
- Kangal
- Karagöz
- Kaşanlı
- Koçovası
- Kötüre
- Küçük Tatlar
- Kuşkayası
- Marabuz
- Mehre
- Nadirköy
- Oğlakkaya
- Ördekköy
- Örenderesi
- Örenli
- Pınarbaşı
- Soğucak
- Söğütdere
- Tanır
- Topaktaş
- Türkçayırı
- Türksevin
- Yazıdere
- Yazıköy
- Yeşilyurt
