= List of municipalities in Kahramanmaraş Province =

This is the List of municipalities in Kahramanmaraş Province, Turkey as of October 2007.

== Municipalities ==
List is sorted alphabetically A-Z, as Districts->Municipalities.

District	Municipality
Afşin	Afşin
Afşin	Alemdar
Afşin	Altunelma
Afşin	Arıtaş
Afşin	Bakraç
Afşin	Büyüktatlı
Afşin	Çobanbeyli
Afşin	Çoğulhan
Afşin	Dağlıca
Afşin	Esence
Afşin	Tanır
Andırın	Andırın
Andırın	Geben
Andırın	Yeşilova
Çağlayancerit	Bozlar
Çağlayancerit	Çağlayancerit
Çağlayancerit	Düzbağ
Ekinözü	Ekinözü
Elbistan	Akbayır
Elbistan	Bakış
Elbistan	Büyükyapalak
Elbistan	Demircilik
Elbistan	Doğan
Elbistan	Elbistan
Elbistan	İğde
Elbistan	Izgın
Elbistan	Karaelbistan
Elbistan	Söğütlü
Göksun	Bozhüyük
Göksun	Büyükkızılcık
Göksun	Çardak
Göksun	Değirmendere
Göksun	Ericek
Göksun	Göksun
Göksun	Kanlıkavak
Göksun	Taşoluk
Kahramanmaraş (Merkez)	Baydemirli
Kahramanmaraş	Döngele
Kahramanmaraş	Fatih
Kahramanmaraş	Fatmalı
Kahramanmaraş	Ilıca
Kahramanmaraş	Kahramanmaraş
Kahramanmaraş	Kale
Kahramanmaraş	Karacasu
Kahramanmaraş	Karadere
Kahramanmaraş	Kavlaklı
Kahramanmaraş	Kürtül
Kahramanmaraş	Önsen
Kahramanmaraş	Şahinkayası
Kahramanmaraş	Tekir
Nurhak	Barış
Nurhak	Kullar
Nurhak	Nurhak
Nurhak	Yeşilkent
Pazarcık	Büyüknacar
Pazarcık	Evri
Pazarcık	Narlı
Pazarcık	Pazarcık
Pazarcık	Yumaklıcerit
Türkoğlu	Beyoğlu
Türkoğlu	Kılılı
Türkoğlu	Şekeroba
Türkoğlu	Türkoğlu
Türkoğlu	Yeşilyöre

== Changes in 2014 ==
According to Law act no 6360, belde (town) municipalities within provinces with more than 750000 population (so called Metropolitan municipalities in Turkey) were abolished as of 30 March 2014. 52 belde municipalities in the above list are now defunct. The list is kept for historical reference.
