= List of populated places in Kahramanmaraş Province =

This is a list of populated places in Kahramanmaraş Province, Turkey.

== List ==
Name	Population
Abbasalar	
Afşin	43,217
Ağabeyli Bucağı	
Ağcaşar	
Akifiye	
Alişar	
Altınyayla	
Andırın	7,989
Arıtaş	
Bahçelievler	
Baydemirli	
Berçenek	
Beyoğlu	
Biçin	
Boylu	
Bulutoğlu	
Cardak	
Cüceli	
Çağlayancerit	12,088
Çiğşar	
Çoğulhan	
Çokyaşar	
Çöçelli	
Demircilik	
Dereboğazı	
Döngele	
Düzbağ	6,032
Ekinözü	5,238
Elbistan	95,037
Elmalar	
Engizek	
Erçene	
Ericek	
Evri	
Fatmalı	
Gafarlı	
Geben	2,127
Göksun	18,775
Gücüksu	
Hacıeyüplü	
Hartlap	
Haticepınar	68
İğde	3,500
İmalı	
Kahramanmaras	443,575
Kalekaya	
Karahasanuşaği	
Kaşanlı	
Kazanlıpınar	
Keklikoluk	
Kılılı	
Kötüre	
Kumarlı	
Küçüküngüt	
Kürtül	
Mehmetbey	
Mezere	
Nurhak	5,611
Oğlakkaya	
Pazarcık	28,582
Sadakalar	
Sarıgüzel	
Şekeroba	
Suluyayla	
Süleymanlı Bucağı	
Şahinkayası	
Şerefoğlu	
Tekir	
Temürağa	
Türkoğlu	15,262
Yenidemir	
