= Sarıerik, Pazarcık =

Village in Kahramanmaraş Province, Turkey

Sarıerik
- Neighbourhood
- Location in Turkey
- Coordinates: 37°20′50″N 37°5′45″E
- Country: Turkey
- Province: Kahramanmaraş
- District: Pazarcık
- Population (2022): 82
- Time zone: UTC+3 (TRT)

Sarıerik, historically Köskanlı, is a neighbourhood in the municipality and district of Pazarcık, Kahramanmaraş Province, Turkey. The village is inhabited by Kurds of the Atma, Kılıçlı and Sinemili tribes and had a population of 82 in 2022. The village is Alevi.
