= Karahüyük, Pazarcık =

Village in Kahramanmaraş Province, Turkey

Karahüyük
- Neighbourhood
- Location in Turkey
- Coordinates: 37°15′55″N 37°1′41″E
- Country: Turkey
- Province: Kahramanmaraş
- District: Pazarcık
- Population (2022): 332
- Time zone: UTC+3 (TRT)

Karahüyük is a neighbourhood in the municipality and district of Pazarcık, Kahramanmaraş Province, Turkey. The village is inhabited by Kurds of the Atma and Celikan tribes and had a population of 332 in 2022.
