= Salmanlı =

Salmanlı may refer to:

- Sevgi Salmanlı (born 1993), Turkish footballer
- Salmanlı, Sabirabad or Mashad-Salmanly or Salmanly, a village and municipality in Azerbaijan
- Salmanlı, Aksaray, a village in Aksaray Province, Turkey
- Salmanlı, Kozan, a neighbourhood in Adana Province, Turkey
- Salmanlı, Pazarcık, a neighbourhood in Kahramanmaraş Province, Turkey
