= Turunçlu, Pazarcık =

Village in Kahramanmaraş Province, Turkey

Turunçlu
- Neighbourhood
- Location in Turkey
- Coordinates: 37°25′59″N 37°25′0″E
- Country: Turkey
- Province: Kahramanmaraş
- District: Pazarcık
- Population (2022): 86
- Time zone: UTC+3 (TRT)

Turunçlu is a neighbourhood in the municipality and district of Pazarcık, Kahramanmaraş Province, Turkey. The village is inhabited by Kurds of the Atma tribe and had a population of 86 in 2022.
