= Damlataş, Pazarcık =

Village in Kahramanmaraş Province, Turkey

Damlataş
- Neighbourhood
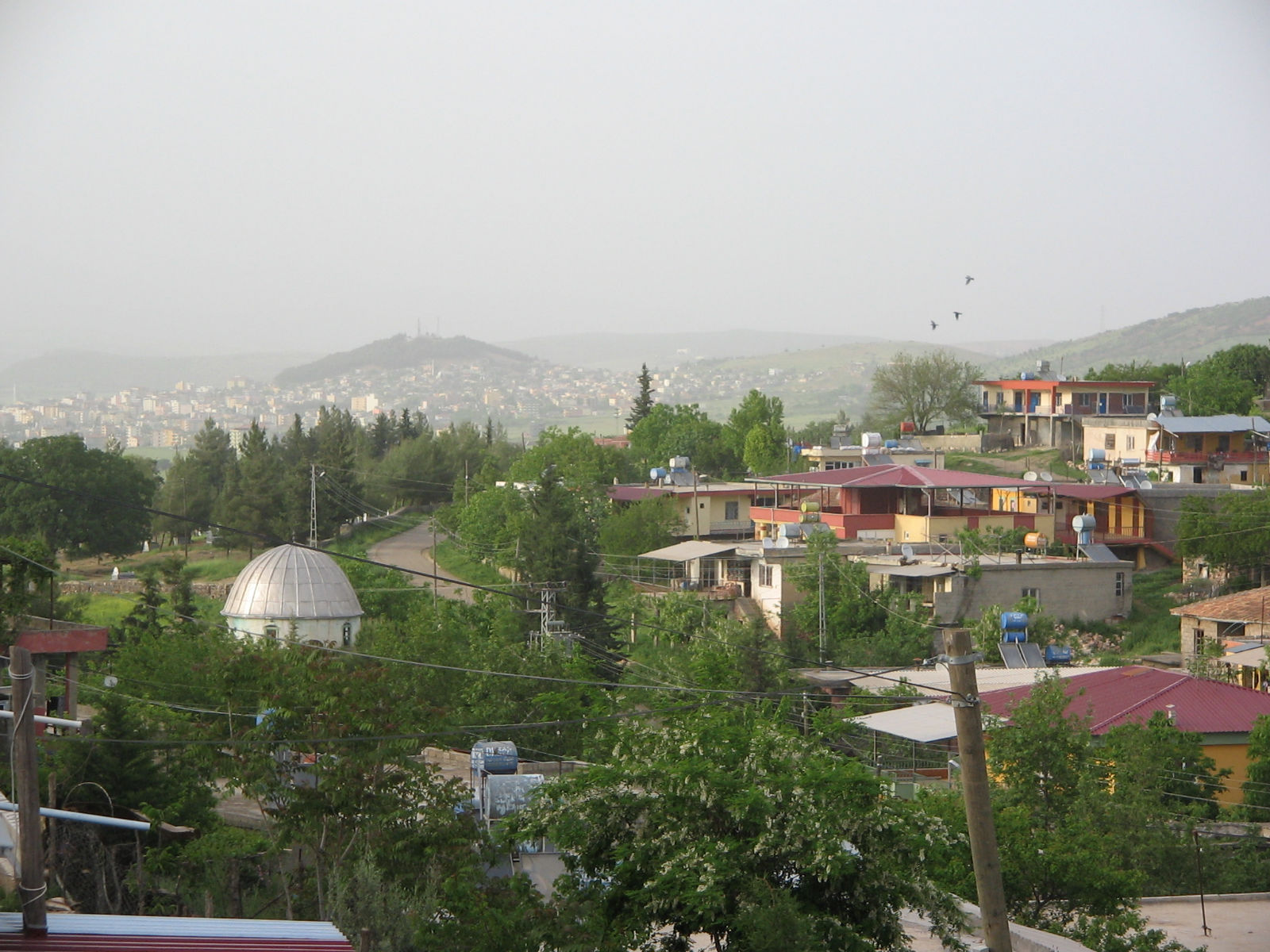

- Location within Turkey
- Coordinates: 37°26′58″N 37°16′45″E
- Country: Turkey
- Province: Kahramanmaraş
- District: Pazarcık
- Population (2022): 225
- Time zone: UTC+3 (TRT)

Damlataş is a neighbourhood in the municipality and district of Pazarcık, Kahramanmaraş Province, Turkey. The village is inhabited by Kurds of various tribes including Atma and Bugan, and had a population of 225 in 2022. The village is composed of both Sunnis and Alevis.
