= Memişkahya, Pazarcık =

Village in Kahramanmaraş Province, Turkey

Memişkahya
- Neighbourhood
- Location in Turkey
- Coordinates: 37°27′2″N 37°18′10″E
- Country: Turkey
- Province: Kahramanmaraş
- District: Pazarcık
- Population (2022): 193
- Time zone: UTC+3 (TRT)

Memişkahya is a neighbourhood in the municipality and district of Pazarcık, Kahramanmaraş Province, Turkey. The village is inhabited by Kurds of the Atma tribe and had a population of 193 in 2022.
