= İncirli, Pazarcık =

Village in Kahramanmaraş Province, Turkey

İncirli
- Neighbourhood
- Location in Turkey
- Coordinates: 37°27′47″N 37°19′23″E
- Country: Turkey
- Province: Kahramanmaraş
- District: Pazarcık
- Population (2022): 38
- Time zone: UTC+3 (TRT)

İncirli is a neighbourhood in the municipality and district of Pazarcık, Kahramanmaraş Province, Turkey. Its population is 38 (2022). The village is inhabited by Kurds of the Atma tribe.
