= Molla Mehmet Karayılan =

Fighter against the French Siege of Aintab

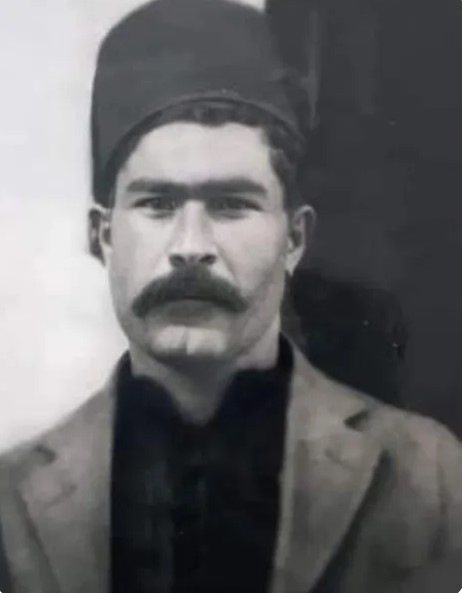
- Born: Mehmet; 1888; Elifler, Ottoman Empire
- Died: 24 May 1920 (aged 32); Aintab, Ottoman Empire

Molla Mehmet Karayılan (1888 - 24 May 1920) was a Kurdish war hero who famously fought and died in the Siege of Aintab as part of the Turkish War of Independence.

== Early life ==
Mehmet was born in 1888 in a tent in the Elifler or Kürt Elif hamlet in the Besni kaza, Ottoman Empire, modern-day Pazarcık, Kahramanmaraş Turkey, to a relatively affluent family belonging to the Kabalar sub-tribe of the Kurdish Atma or Reshwan tribe. His father, Mahmut, was a skillful fighter, earning him the nickname Karayılan (lit. black snake), which Mehmet inherited. In 1904, his father was killed by Armenian bandits raiding the hamlet.

Mehmet took Quran lessons from the imam of the Söğütlü village in modern-day Malatya Province and became the imam of his own village. Because of this, he came to be known as Molla.

== World War I ==
Molla Mehmet fought against Russia for the Ottomans during World War I and got injured on his leg. After healing, he became the leader of his tribe. He collaborated with the Ottoman government to track down and kill the infamous bandit Bozan Agha, who terrorized the region between Pazarcık and Malatya.

== Participation in the Siege of Aintab and death ==
Upon hearing of the French expansion to Aintab, Molla Mehmet gathered 82 volunteers from his tribe to join the Kuva-yi Milliye and sold his family property, against his mother’s wish for him to stay. Defeating French forces marching towards Marash in Karabıyıklı, Mehmet was able to capture 50 French soldiers, which earned him great fame throughout Turkey. The local Association for Defence of National Rights invited him for a mission to capture and kill Kel Ahmet (lit. Bald Ahmet), who raided the Turkish villages near Sam and Dülük and hindered the Turkish side in the Franco-Turkish War. After he hanged Kel Ahmet in Dülük, Karayılan met Kılıç Ali Bey and breached the French forces in Dülük sieging Aintab. He then released and recruited the prisoners in the city's prison. On 24 May 1920, he succumbed to a bullet to his chest. He became a hero of the Turkish War of Independence.

== Popular Culture ==
The famous Turkish poet Nâzım Hikmet mentioned him in his book Kuvâyi Milliye.
