= Salmanıpak, Pazarcık =

Village in Kahramanmaraş Province, Turkey

Salmanıpak
- Neighbourhood
- Location in Turkey
- Coordinates: 37°25′50″N 37°13′25″E
- Country: Turkey
- Province: Kahramanmaraş
- District: Pazarcık
- Population (2022): 156
- Time zone: UTC+3 (TRT)

Salmanıpak is a neighbourhood in the municipality and district of Pazarcık, Kahramanmaraş Province, Turkey. The village is populated by Kurds of the Atma tribe and had a population of 156 in 2022.
