= Sallıuşağı, Pazarcık =

Village in Kahramanmaraş Province, Turkey

Sallıuşağı
- Neighbourhood
- Location in Turkey
- Coordinates: 37°31′39″N 37°25′29″E
- Country: Turkey
- Province: Kahramanmaraş
- District: Pazarcık
- Population (2022): 290
- Time zone: UTC+3 (TRT)

Sallıuşağı is a neighbourhood in the municipality and district of Pazarcık, Kahramanmaraş Province, Turkey. The village is inhabited by Kurds of the Atma and Sinemilli tribes and had a population of 290 in 2022.
