= Hürriyet, Pazarcık =

Village in Kahramanmaraş Province, Turkey

Hürriyet
- Neighbourhood
- Location in Turkey
- Coordinates: 37°21′37″N 37°22′42″E
- Country: Turkey
- Province: Kahramanmaraş
- District: Pazarcık
- Population (2022): 746
- Time zone: UTC+3 (TRT)

Hürriyet (Kurdish: Maxikon) is a neighbourhood in the municipality and district of Pazarcık, Kahramanmaraş Province, Turkey. The village is populated by Kurds of the Atma tribe and had a population of 746 in 2022.
