= Akdemir, Pazarcık =

Village in Kahramanmaraş Province, Turkey

Akdemir
- Neighbourhood
- Location in Turkey
- Coordinates: 37°16′35″N 37°0′48″E
- Country: Turkey
- Province: Kahramanmaraş
- District: Pazarcık
- Population (2022): 265
- Time zone: UTC+3 (TRT)

Akdemir, historically Pulyanlı, is a neighbourhood in the municipality and district of Pazarcık, Kahramanmaraş Province, Turkey. The village is inhabited by Alevi Kurds of the Sinemilli tribe and had a population of 265 in 2022.
