= Akçalar, Pazarcık =

Village in Kahramanmaraş Province, Turkey

Akçalar
- Neighbourhood
- Location in Turkey
- Coordinates: 37°31′57″N 37°26′36″E
- Country: Turkey
- Province: Kahramanmaraş
- District: Pazarcık
- Population (2022): 174
- Time zone: UTC+3 (TRT)

Akçalar is a neighbourhood in the municipality and district of Pazarcık, Kahramanmaraş Province, Turkey. The village is inhabited by Kurds of the Atma tribe and had a population of 174 in 2022. The village is composed of both Sunnis and Alevis.
