= Ağcaşar =

Ağcaşar can refer to:

- Ağcaşar, Afşin; see List of populated places in Kahramanmaraş Province
- Ağcaşar, Köprüköy
- Ağcaşar Dam
