= Köprüağzı railway station =

Railway station in Kahramanmaraş, Turkey

KÖPRÜAĞZI

General information
- Location: Köprüağzı, Türkoğlu; Kahramanmaraş Province; Turkey
- Coordinates: 37°21′45″N 37°0′2″E
- Owner: Turkish State Railways

Services
Preceding station	TCDD Taşımacılık	Following station
Sevindik towards Adana	Euphrates Express	Narlı towards Elazığ
Location
- Location within Turkey

Köprüağzı station is a train station in Turkey.It is located at 37°21′45″N 37°0′2″E in Türkoğlu ilçe (district) of Kahramanmaraş Province. It is a junction point of the main east to west railway and a spur line to Kahramanmaraş . In addition to freight trains main passenger train is Fırat Express (Adana-Elazığ) train.
