= Çöçelli, Pazarcık =

Village in Kahramanmaraş Province, Turkey

Çöçelli
- Neighbourhood
- Location in Turkey
- Coordinates: 37°16′43″N 37°8′18″E
- Country: Turkey
- Province: Kahramanmaraş
- District: Pazarcık
- Population (2022): 529
- Time zone: UTC+3 (TRT)

Çöçelli (Kurdish: Çocalon) is a neighbourhood in the municipality and district of Pazarcık, Kahramanmaraş Province, Turkey. The village is inhabited by Kurds of the Atma tribe and had a population of 529 in 2022.
