= Göçer, Pazarcık =

Village in Kahramanmaraş Province, Turkey

Göçer
- Neighbourhood
- Location in Turkey
- Coordinates: 37°37′41″N 37°28′9″E
- Country: Turkey
- Province: Kahramanmaraş
- District: Pazarcık
- Population (2022): 31
- Time zone: UTC+3 (TRT)

Göçer is a neighbourhood in the municipality and district of Pazarcık, Kahramanmaraş Province, Turkey. The village is inhabited by Kurds of the Atma tribe and had a population of 31 in 2022.
