= Eğlen, Pazarcık =

Village in Kahramanmaraş Province, Turkey

Eğlen
- Neighbourhood
- Location in Turkey
- Coordinates: 37°19′49″N 37°7′49″E
- Country: Turkey
- Province: Kahramanmaraş
- District: Pazarcık
- Population (2022): 114
- Time zone: UTC+3 (TRT)

Eğlen is a neighbourhood in the municipality and district of Pazarcık, Kahramanmaraş Province, Turkey. The village is inhabited by Alevi Kurds of the Kılıçlı tribe and had a population of 114 in 2022.
