= Musolar, Pazarcık =

Village in Kahramanmaraş Province, Turkey

Musolar
- Neighbourhood
- Location in Turkey
- Coordinates: 37°34′32″N 37°23′4″E
- Country: Turkey
- Province: Kahramanmaraş
- District: Pazarcık
- Population (2022): 337
- Time zone: UTC+3 (TRT)

Musolar is a neighbourhood in the municipality and district of Pazarcık, Kahramanmaraş Province, Turkey. The village is inhabited by Alevi Kurds and had a population of 337 in 2022.
