= Nefsidoğanlı, Pazarcık =

Village in Kahramanmaraş Province, Turkey

Nefsidoğanlı
- Neighbourhood
- Location in Turkey
- Coordinates: 37°24′46″N 37°9′14″E
- Country: Turkey
- Province: Kahramanmaraş
- District: Pazarcık
- Population (2022): 354
- Time zone: UTC+3 (TRT)

Nefsidoğanlı is a neighbourhood in the municipality and district of Pazarcık, Kahramanmaraş Province, Turkey. The village is inhabited by Alevi Kurds of the Reşwan tribe and had a population of 354 in 2022.
