= Cimikanlı, Pazarcık =

Village in Kahramanmaraş Province, Turkey

Cimikanlı
- Neighbourhood
- Location in Turkey
- Coordinates: 37°22′17″N 37°12′57″E
- Country: Turkey
- Province: Kahramanmaraş
- District: Pazarcık
- Population (2022): 497
- Time zone: UTC+3 (TRT)

Cimikanlı, formerly İğdeli, is a neighbourhood in the municipality and district of Pazarcık, Kahramanmaraş Province, Turkey. The village is inhabited by Alevi Kurds of the Deregezen and Bugan tribes, and had a population of 497 in 2022.
