= Mezraa, Pazarcık =

Village in Kahramanmaraş Province, Turkey

Mezraa
- Neighbourhood
- Location in Turkey
- Coordinates: 37°24′19″N 37°22′31″E
- Country: Turkey
- Province: Kahramanmaraş
- District: Pazarcık
- Population (2022): 730
- Time zone: UTC+3 (TRT)

Mezraa (also: Mezere) is a neighbourhood in the municipality and district of Pazarcık, Kahramanmaraş Province, Turkey. The village is inhabited by Alevi Kurds and had a population of 730 in 2022.
