= Tetirlik, Pazarcık =

Village in Kahramanmaraş Province, Turkey

Tetirlik
- Neighbourhood
- Location in Turkey
- Coordinates: 37°32′16″N 37°16′22″E
- Country: Turkey
- Province: Kahramanmaraş
- District: Pazarcık
- Population (2022): 1,037
- Time zone: UTC+3 (TRT)

Tetirlik is a neighbourhood in the municipality and district of Pazarcık, Kahramanmaraş Province, Turkey. The village is inhabited by Alevi Kurds and Abdals, and had a population of 1,037 in 2022.
