= Karaağaç, Pazarcık =

Village in Kahramanmaraş Province, Turkey

Karaağaç
- Neighbourhood
- Location in Turkey
- Coordinates: 37°36′12″N 37°21′22″E
- Country: Turkey
- Province: Kahramanmaraş
- District: Pazarcık
- Population (2022): 310
- Time zone: UTC+3 (TRT)

Karağaç, historically Esmepuru, is a neighbourhood in the municipality and district of Pazarcık, Kahramanmaraş Province, Turkey. The village is inhabited by Kurds of the Sinemilli tribe and had a population of 310 in 2022.
