= Emiroğlu, Pazarcık =

Village in Kahramanmaraş Province, Turkey

Emiroğlu
- Neighbourhood
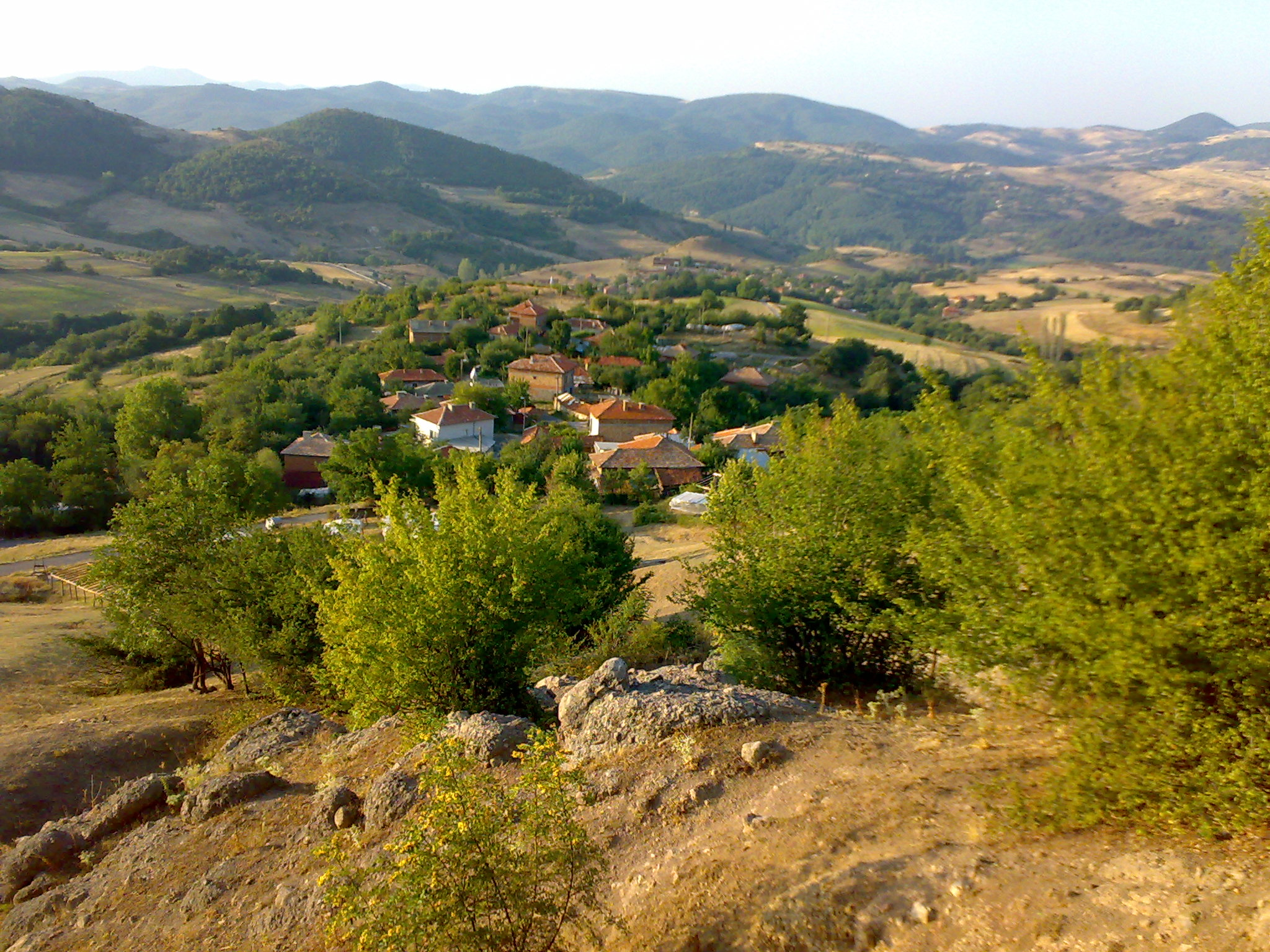

- Location within Turkey
- Coordinates: 37°19′54″N 37°3′44″E
- Country: Turkey
- Province: Kahramanmaraş
- District: Pazarcık
- Population (2022): 351
- Time zone: UTC+3 (TRT)

Emiroğlu, historically Araplı, is a neighbourhood in the municipality and district of Pazarcık, Kahramanmaraş Province, Turkey. The village is inhabited by Turkmens and Kurds of the Kılıçlı tribe and a minority of Arabs. It had a population of 351 in 2022.
