= Büyüknacar Fatih, Pazarcık =

Village in Kahramanmaraş Province, Turkey

Büyüknacar Fatih
- Neighbourhood
- Location in Turkey
- Coordinates: 37°36′23″N 37°16′4″E
- Country: Turkey
- Province: Kahramanmaraş
- District: Pazarcık
- Population (2022): 404
- Time zone: UTC+3 (TRT)

Büyüknacar Fatih is a neighbourhood in the municipality and district of Pazarcık, Kahramanmaraş Province, Turkey. The village had a population of 404 in 2022.
