= Yarbaşı =

Yarbaşı may refer to the following places in Turkey:

- Yarbaşı, Gölbaşı, a village in Adıyaman Province
- Yarbaşı, Düziçi, a town in Osmaniye Province
- Yarbaşı, İdil, a village in Şırnak Province
- Yarbaşı, Oltu, a neighbourhood in Erzurum Province
- Yarbaşı, Pazarcık, a neighbourhood in Kahramanmaraş Province
- Yarbaşı, Pülümür, a village in Tunceli Province
- Yarbaşı, Vezirköprü, a village in Samsun Province
- Yarbaşı, Yusufeli, a village in Artvin Province

== See also ==
- Yarbaşçandır, Konyaaltı, a village in Antalya Province
