= Soku, Pazarcık =

Village in Kahramanmaraş Province, Turkey

Soku
- Neighbourhood
- Location in Turkey
- Coordinates: 37°37′4″N 37°24′48″E
- Country: Turkey
- Province: Kahramanmaraş
- District: Pazarcık
- Population (2022): 223
- Time zone: UTC+3 (TRT)

Soku, also known as Milyanlısoku, is a neighbourhood in the municipality and district of Pazarcık, Kahramanmaraş Province, Turkey. The village is inhabited by Kurds of the Sinemilli tribe and had a population of 223 in 2022.
