= Karagöl, Pazarcık =

Village in Kahramanmaraş Province, Turkey

Karagöl
- Neighbourhood
- Location in Turkey
- Coordinates: 37°20′36″N 37°19′39″E
- Country: Turkey
- Province: Kahramanmaraş
- District: Pazarcık
- Population (2022): 1,348
- Time zone: UTC+3 (TRT)

Karagöl is a neighbourhood in the municipality and district of Pazarcık, Kahramanmaraş Province, Turkey. The village is inhabited by Sunni Turks and had a population of 1,348 in 2022.
