= Yiğitler =

Yiğitler may refer to the following settlements:

- Yiğitler, Çermik, a neighbourhood in Diyarbakır Province, Turkey
- Yiğitler, Karlıova, a village in Bingöl Province, Turkey
- Yiğitler, Nazımiye, a village in Tunceli Province, Turkey
- Yiğitler, Pazarcık or Tabiye, a neighbourhood in Kahramanmaraş Province, Turkey
- Yiğitler, Sason, a village in Batman Province, Turkey
- Yiğitler, the Turkish name for Arsos, Larnaca, northern Cyprus
