= Kadıncık, Pazarcık =

Village in Kahramanmaraş Province, Turkey

Kadıncık
- Neighbourhood
- Location in Turkey
- Coordinates: 37°22′46″N 37°9′11″E
- Country: Turkey
- Province: Kahramanmaraş
- District: Pazarcık
- Population (2022): 216
- Time zone: UTC+3 (TRT)

Kadıncık is a neighbourhood in the municipality and district of Pazarcık, Kahramanmaraş Province, Turkey. The village is populated by Kurds of the Sinemili tribe and had a population of 216 in 2022.
