= Ufacıklı, Pazarcık =

Village in Kahramanmaraş Province, Turkey

Ufacıklı
- Neighbourhood
- Location in Turkey
- Coordinates: 37°24′43″N 37°19′50″E
- Country: Turkey
- Province: Kahramanmaraş
- District: Pazarcık
- Population (2022): 1,469
- Time zone: UTC+3 (TRT)

Ufacıklı is a neighbourhood in the municipality and district of Pazarcık, Kahramanmaraş Province, Turkey. The village is inhabited by Sunni Turks and had a population of 1,469 in 2022.
