= Çiçek, Pazarcık =

Village in Kahramanmaraş Province, Turkey

Çiçek
- Neighbourhood
- Location in Turkey
- Coordinates: 37°19′12″N 37°8′13″E
- Country: Turkey
- Province: Kahramanmaraş
- District: Pazarcık
- Population (2022): 33
- Time zone: UTC+3 (TRT)

Çiçek is a neighbourhood in the municipality and district of Pazarcık, Kahramanmaraş Province, Turkey. The village is inhabited by Kurds of the Kılıçlı tribe and had a population of 33 in 2022.
