= Çiçekalanı, Pazarcık =

Village in Kahramanmaraş Province, Turkey

Çiçekalanı
- Neighbourhood
- Location in Turkey
- Coordinates: 37°31′12″N 37°16′10″E
- Country: Turkey
- Province: Kahramanmaraş
- District: Pazarcık
- Population (2022): 110
- Time zone: UTC+3 (TRT)

Çiçekalanı is a neighbourhood in the municipality and district of Pazarcık, Kahramanmaraş Province, Turkey. The village is inhabited by Kurds of the Sinemilli tribe and had a population of 110 in 2022.
