= Sultanlar, Pazarcık =

Village in Kahramanmaraş Province, Turkey

Sultanlar
- Neighbourhood
- Location in Turkey
- Coordinates: 37°21′8″N 37°15′21″E
- Country: Turkey
- Province: Kahramanmaraş
- District: Pazarcık
- Population (2022): 578
- Time zone: UTC+3 (TRT)

Sultanlar is a neighbourhood in the municipality and district of Pazarcık, Kahramanmaraş Province, Turkey. The village is inhabited by Sunni Turks and had a population of 578 in 2022.
