= Yeşilkent, Pazarcık =

Village in Kahramanmaraş Province, Turkey

Yeşilkent
- Neighbourhood
- Location in Turkey
- Coordinates: 37°31′18″N 37°24′3″E
- Country: Turkey
- Province: Kahramanmaraş
- District: Pazarcık
- Population (2022): 91
- Time zone: UTC+3 (TRT)

Yeşilkent is a neighbourhood in the municipality and district of Pazarcık, Kahramanmaraş Province, Turkey. The village had a population of 91 in 2022.
