= Taşdemir, Pazarcık =

Village in Kahramanmaraş Province, Turkey

Taşdemir
- Neighbourhood
- Location in Turkey
- Coordinates: 37°33′3″N 37°31′38″E
- Country: Turkey
- Province: Kahramanmaraş
- District: Pazarcık
- Population (2022): 471
- Time zone: UTC+3 (TRT)

Taşdemir is a neighbourhood in the municipality and district of Pazarcık, Kahramanmaraş Province, Turkey. The village had a population of 471 in 2022.

The primary school is PAZARCIK - Taşdemir İlkokulu.
