= Harmancık, Pazarcık =

Village in Kahramanmaraş Province, Turkey

Harmancık
- Neighbourhood
- Location in Turkey
- Coordinates: 37°30′53″N 37°32′22″E
- Country: Turkey
- Province: Kahramanmaraş
- District: Pazarcık
- Population (2022): 52
- Time zone: UTC+3 (TRT)

Harmancık is a neighbourhood in the municipality and district of Pazarcık, Kahramanmaraş Province, Turkey. The village is populated by Turks and had a population of 52 in 2022.
