= Bağdınısağır, Pazarcık =

Village in Kahramanmaraş Province, Turkey

Bağdınısağır
- Neighbourhood
- Location in Turkey
- Coordinates: 37°30′33″N 37°19′33″E
- Country: Turkey
- Province: Kahramanmaraş
- District: Pazarcık
- Population (2022): 2,613
- Time zone: UTC+3 (TRT)

Bağdınısağır is a neighbourhood in the municipality and district of Pazarcık, Kahramanmaraş Province, Turkey. The village had a population of 2,613 in 2022.
