= Şahintepe, Pazarcık =

Village in Kahramanmaraş Province, Turkey

Şahintepe
- Neighbourhood
- Location in Turkey
- Coordinates: 37°32′44″N 37°19′10″E
- Country: Turkey
- Province: Kahramanmaraş
- District: Pazarcık
- Population (2022): 815
- Time zone: UTC+3 (TRT)

Şahintepe is a neighbourhood in the municipality and district of Pazarcık, Kahramanmaraş Province, Turkey. The village had a population of 815 in 2022.
