= Eğrice, Pazarcık =

Village in Kahramanmaraş Province, Turkey

Eğrice
- Neighbourhood
- Location in Turkey
- Coordinates: 37°21′40″N 37°19′59″E
- Country: Turkey
- Province: Kahramanmaraş
- District: Pazarcık
- Population (2022): 1,156
- Time zone: UTC+3 (TRT)

Eğrice is a neighbourhood in the municipality and district of Pazarcık, Kahramanmaraş Province, Turkey. The village had a population of 1,156 in 2022.
