= Osmandede, Pazarcık =

Village in Kahramanmaraş Province, Turkey

Osmandede
- Neighbourhood
- Location in Turkey
- Coordinates: 37°19′26″N 37°5′57″E
- Country: Turkey
- Province: Kahramanmaraş
- District: Pazarcık
- Population (2022): 132
- Time zone: UTC+3 (TRT)

Osmandede is a neighbourhood in the municipality and district of Pazarcık, Kahramanmaraş Province, Turkey. The village is inhabited by Turkmens and Kurds of the Kılıçlı tribe and had a population of 132 in 2022.
