= Dedepaşa, Pazarcık =

Village in Kahramanmaraş Province, Turkey

Dedepaşa
- Neighbourhood
- Location in Turkey
- Coordinates: 37°19′55″N 37°7′21″E
- Country: Turkey
- Province: Kahramanmaraş
- District: Pazarcık
- Population (2022): 72
- Time zone: UTC+3 (TRT)

Dedepaşa is a neighbourhood in the municipality and district of Pazarcık, Kahramanmaraş Province, Turkey. The village is inhabited by Kurds of the Kılıçlı tribe with a minority of Sunni Turks. It had a population of 72 in 2022.
