= Aşağımülk, Pazarcık =

Village in Kahramanmaraş Province, Turkey

Aşağımülk
- Neighbourhood
- Location in Turkey
- Coordinates: 37°26′32″N 37°28′30″E
- Country: Turkey
- Province: Kahramanmaraş
- District: Pazarcık
- Population (2022): 649
- Time zone: UTC+3 (TRT)

Aşağımülk is a neighbourhood in the municipality and district of Pazarcık, Kahramanmaraş Province, Turkey. The village is inhabited by Turkmens of the Qiziq tribe and had a population of 649 in 2022.
