= Hanobası, Pazarcık =

Village in Kahramanmaraş Province, Turkey

Hanobası
- Neighbourhood
- Location in Turkey
- Coordinates: 37°18′29″N 37°7′40″E
- Country: Turkey
- Province: Kahramanmaraş
- District: Pazarcık
- Population (2022): 76
- Time zone: UTC+3 (TRT)

Hanobası is a neighbourhood in the municipality and district of Pazarcık, Kahramanmaraş Province, Turkey. The village is inhabited by Kurds of the Kılıçlı tribe and had a population of 76 in 2022.
