= Çamlıca, Pazarcık =

Village in Kahramanmaraş Province, Turkey

Çamlıca
- Neighbourhood
- Location in Turkey
- Coordinates: 37°33′50″N 37°15′6″E
- Country: Turkey
- Province: Kahramanmaraş
- District: Pazarcık
- Population (2022): 101
- Time zone: UTC+3 (TRT)

Çamlıca is a neighbourhood in the municipality and district of Pazarcık, Kahramanmaraş Province, Turkey. The village is inhabited by Kurds of the Sinemilli tribe and had a population of 101 in 2022.
