= Yarbaşı, Pazarcık =

Village in Kahramanmaraş Province, Turkey

Yarbaşı
- Neighbourhood
- Location in Turkey
- Coordinates: 37°28′27″N 37°13′27″E
- Country: Turkey
- Province: Kahramanmaraş
- District: Pazarcık
- Population (2022): 46
- Time zone: UTC+3 (TRT)

Yarbaşı is a neighbourhood in the municipality and district of Pazarcık, Kahramanmaraş Province, Turkey. The village is inhabited by Alevi Kurds and had a population of 46 in 2022.
