= Göynük, Pazarcık =

Village in Kahramanmaraş Province, Turkey

Göynük
- Neighbourhood
- Location in Turkey
- Coordinates: 37°40′31″N 37°26′3″E
- Country: Turkey
- Province: Kahramanmaraş
- District: Pazarcık
- Population (2022): 274
- Time zone: UTC+3 (TRT)

Göynük is a neighbourhood in the municipality and district of Pazarcık, Kahramanmaraş Province, Turkey. The village is inhabited by Sunni Circassians and had a population of 274 in 2022.
