= Kuzeykent, Pazarcık =

Village in Kahramanmaraş Province, Turkey

Kuzeykent
- Neighbourhood
- Location in Turkey
- Coordinates: 37°22′22″N 37°15′47″E
- Country: Turkey
- Province: Kahramanmaraş
- District: Pazarcık
- Population (2022): 249
- Time zone: UTC+3 (TRT)

Kuzeykent, also known as Kuzkent, is a neighbourhood in the municipality and district of Pazarcık, Kahramanmaraş Province, Turkey. The village is inhabited by Sunni Turks and had a population of 249 in 2022.
