= Yolboyu, Pazarcık =

Village in Kahramanmaraş Province, Turkey

Yolboyu
- Neighbourhood
- Location in Turkey
- Coordinates: 37°27′20″N 37°13′27″E
- Country: Turkey
- Province: Kahramanmaraş
- District: Pazarcık
- Population (2022): 77
- Time zone: UTC+3 (TRT)

Yolboyu, also known as Hıdranlı or Kantarma, is a neighbourhood in the municipality and district of Pazarcık, Kahramanmaraş Province in Turkey. The village is inhabited by Kurds of the Sinemilli tribe and had a population of 77 in 2022.
