= Karayılan (disambiguation) =

Karayılan, Hatay is a town in Hatay Province, Turkey.

Karayılan may also refer to:

- Murat Karayılan, the leader of the PKK
- Molla Mehmet Karayılan, a Kurdish fighter who fought in the 1910s and 1920s
