= Yukarımülk, Pazarcık =

Village in Kahramanmaraş Province, Turkey

Yukarımülk
- Neighbourhood
- Location in Turkey
- Coordinates: 37°27′3″N 37°28′4″E
- Country: Turkey
- Province: Kahramanmaraş
- District: Pazarcık
- Population (2022): 381
- Time zone: UTC+3 (TRT)

Yukarımülk is a neighbourhood in the municipality and district of Pazarcık, Kahramanmaraş Province, Turkey. The village is inhabited by Turkmens of the Qiziq tribe and had a population of 381 in 2022.
