= Yiğitler, Pazarcık =

Village in Kahramanmaraş Province, Turkey

Yiğitler
- Neighbourhood
- Location in Turkey
- Coordinates: 37°19′34″N 37°18′8″E
- Country: Turkey
- Province: Kahramanmaraş
- District: Pazarcık
- Population (2022): 449
- Time zone: UTC+3 (TRT)

Yiğitler, historically Tabiye, is a neighbourhood in the municipality and district of Pazarcık, Kahramanmaraş Province, Turkey. The village is inhabited by Alevi Kurds of the Sinemilli tribe and Sunni Turks, and had a population of 449 in 2022.
