= Sarıl, Pazarcık =

Village in Kahramanmaraş Province, Turkey

Sarıl
- Neighbourhood
- Location in Turkey
- Coordinates: 37°26′31″N 37°31′51″E
- Country: Turkey
- Province: Kahramanmaraş
- District: Pazarcık
- Population (2022): 425
- Time zone: UTC+3 (TRT)

Sarıl is a neighbourhood in the municipality and district of Pazarcık, Kahramanmaraş Province, Turkey. The village is inhabited by Turkmens of the Qiziq tribe and had a population of 425 in 2022.
