= Sakarkaya, Pazarcık =

Village in Kahramanmaraş Province, Turkey

Sakarkaya
- Neighbourhood
- Location in Turkey
- Coordinates: 37°38′44″N 37°24′18″E
- Country: Turkey
- Province: Kahramanmaraş
- District: Pazarcık
- Population (2022): 1,053
- Time zone: UTC+3 (TRT)

Sakarkaya is a neighbourhood in the municipality and district of Pazarcık, Kahramanmaraş Province, Turkey. The village is inhabited by Sunni Turks and had a population of 1,053 in 2022.
