= Büyüknacar Kocadere, Pazarcık =

Village in Kahramanmaraş Province, Turkey

Büyüknacar Kocadere
- Neighbourhood
- Location in Turkey
- Coordinates: 37°34′54″N 37°19′6″E
- Country: Turkey
- Province: Kahramanmaraş
- District: Pazarcık
- Population (2022): 356
- Time zone: UTC+3 (TRT)

Büyüknacar Kocadere is a neighbourhood in the municipality and district of Pazarcık, Kahramanmaraş Province, Turkey. The village had a population of 356 in 2022.
