= Çiğdemtepe, Pazarcık =

Village in Kahramanmaraş Province, Turkey

Çiğdemtepe
- Neighbourhood
- Location in Turkey
- Coordinates: 37°23′31″N 37°9′34″E
- Country: Turkey
- Province: Kahramanmaraş
- District: Pazarcık
- Population (2022): 957
- Time zone: UTC+3 (TRT)

Çiğdemtepe is a neighbourhood in the municipality and district of Pazarcık, Kahramanmaraş Province, Turkey. The village had a population of 957 in 2022.
