= Salmanlı, Pazarcık =

Village in Kahramanmaraş Province, Turkey

Salmanlı
- Neighbourhood
- Location in Turkey
- Coordinates: 37°23′59″N 37°15′15″E
- Country: Turkey
- Province: Kahramanmaraş
- District: Pazarcık
- Population (2022): 330
- Time zone: UTC+3 (TRT)

Salmanlı is a neighbourhood in the municipality and district of Pazarcık, Kahramanmaraş Province, Turkey. The village is inhabited by Sunni Turks and had a population of 330 in 2022.
