= Evri Taşbiçme =

Village in Kahramanmaraş Province, Turkey

- Neighbourhood
- Location in Turkey
- Coordinates: 37°15′24″N 37°4′8″E
- Country: Turkey
- Province: Kahramanmaraş
- District: Pazarcık
- Population (2022): 935
- Time zone: UTC+3 (TRT)

Evri Taşbiçme is a neighbourhood of the municipality and district of Pazarcık, Kahramanmaraş Province, Turkey. Its population is 935 (2022). Before the 2013 reorganisation, Evri was a town (belde). The village is inhabited by Sunni Turks.
