= Narlı, Pazarcık =

Village in Kahramanmaraş Province, Turkey

Narlı
- Neighbourhood
- Location in Turkey
- Coordinates: 37°23′33″N 37°8′32″E
- Country: Turkey
- Province: Kahramanmaraş
- District: Pazarcık
- Population (2022): 6,781
- Time zone: UTC+3 (TRT)

Narlı is a neighbourhood of the municipality and district of Pazarcık, Kahramanmaraş Province, Turkey. Its population is 6,781 (2022). Before the 2013 reorganisation, it was a town (belde). It is subdivided into three mahalle: Bahçelievler, Cumhuriyet and İsmetpaşa. The town is populated by Kurds. The demographics of the town is mixed, with Alevis forming the majority of the population.
