= İğde =

- Neighbourhood
- Location in Turkey
- Coordinates: 38°09′22″N 37°05′45″E
- Country: Turkey
- Province: Kahramanmaraş
- District: Elbistan
- Population (2022): 1,697
- Time zone: UTC+3 (TRT)
- Postal code: 46300

İğde is a neighbourhood of the municipality and district of Elbistan, Kahramanmaraş Province, Turkey. Its population is 1,697 (2022). Before the 2013 reorganisation, it was a town (belde). It is located between Elbistan (16 km from it) and Ekinözü.

The dominant climate is the continental one. The climate is very dry, but irrigation is provided by the Ceyhan River (that takes birth in Elbistan), one of the biggest rivers in Turkey. There are one elementary and one high school.
