= Duzgin Bawo =

Kurdish religious figure

Duzgin Baba
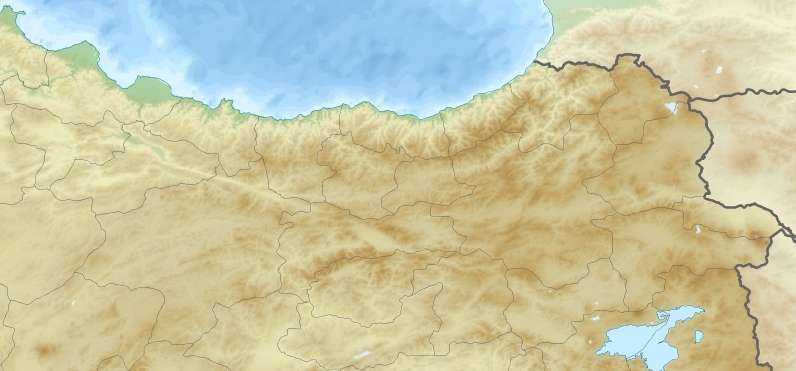

Surela, Bımbarek, Sultan
- Venerated in: Kurdish Alevism Zaza Alevism (generally in Alevism)
- Major shrine: The "Düzgün Baba Hill" in Kılköy, Nazımiye

Duzgin Baba (Zazaki: Duzgın Baba or dial. Duzgın Bava, also Kemerê Duzgıni "the rock of Duzgın", Kurdish: Duzgin Baba, دوزگن بابا), Dizgin տիզկին, is a religious figure among Alevi Zazas and Kurds, especially in the Tunceli Province. He also symbolizes a mountain in Nazımiye, nearby the village Qıl. The people believe that he disappeared at the top of this mountain, which is known as Kemerê Duzgıni (the rock of Duzgın), Bimbarek (holy) or Kemerê Bımbareki (holy rock) in Zazaki. According to local narrations he is the son of sayyid Khurês/Khurêş who was an ancestor of Khurêşan community and his real name is not Duzgın, it is Haydar or Shah Haydar (Zaz. Sa Heyder). But some researches suggest the opposite of this view.

== Story ==
Duzgi was known as a wali in Tunceli where he performed a miracle keramat ('miracle'). One winter the weather was very bad, bringing on a drought and the people were struggling to feed themselves let alone their animals. However, Duzgın's flock seemed healthy. His father was curious about how Duzgın kept them healthy. One day he followed him and saw that whenever Duzgın shook his staff over the dry earth plants began to grow and the flock fed on them. His father was about to leave unnoticed when one of the flock sneezed a few times and Duzgi said; "What's the matter? Did you see Kurêso Khurr and that's what made you sneeze?" At the same time, he turns round and catches sight of his father and then he runs to the top of the mountain. He disappeared 'divinely', out of shame of his father.

== Etymology ==
Although the name Duzgın sounds like a Turkish word, it does not originally come from Turkish düzgün which means smooth or correct. The Turkification process of Alevi myths and beliefs in Tunceli has begun especially with some leaders of Bektashi order who have tried to get contact with local leaders of Alevi Kurds in the 19th century. Thus it is possible that at this time they added some new motifs to local myths to explain them with Turkish terms. Ağuçan, the name of another sayyid community may be a brilliant example. Because most people in the region still believe that it means 'someone who drinks poison' (Turkish ağu içen) in Turkish, although it is a popular etymological view. The name Duzgın and Dizgun are transformation of the name of another mythological figure in the region. He is Tujik/Tuzik which means sharp in Zazaki and Kurdish and it also symbolizes a mountain. Like Duzgın, he is a personification of a mountain, originally of an ancient god (Vahagn). According some songs of aşıks (ashik) he is the strongest veli (saint) in Tunceli. He is the head of 366 saints. Some scholars think that the name of Tujik comes from Armenian duzakh which means the hell among Zoroastrian Armenians. It may be a harmonized form to pronounces of new local languages. Tujik was originally a volcanic mountain. Therefore, the people gave it this name. The Turks who live nearby the mountain, for the same reason gave the name Cehennem dağı (the mountain Hell) to the mountain Tendürek. Because of its volcanic activity people sometimes heard roars coming from the mountain. Moreover, the etymological origin of the name of Tendürek indirectly refers to 'hell' as a metaphor. It is associated with the word of tandoor which means a kind of oven.

== Origins ==
Some scholars think that there is a association between Armenian Mithra (Mehr or Mihr) and Bava Duzgi/Dizgun Bava. Because the mountains of Tunceli was a shelter for Zoroastrian Armenian who have resisted the process of Christianisation in ancient times and there were cult places of the Zoroastrian divinities in the borderland of ancient 'Tunceli' . For example, Bagayaric (now Pekeriç, in Erzincan) was the cult place of Armenian Mithra. Kemah (Turkey) was for Ahuramazda (Armenian Ohrmazd). Therefore, it can be traced from some placenames in Tunceli. The most clear example is about the name of Mercan mountains which etymologically is connected with Mehr.

Not only place names, also mythological elements point to this continuity. First of all, Mithra was a god of contracts and friendship and a protector of truth. Duzgi can resolve individual conflicts among Alevi Zazas and Kurds, also alevitized Armenians of Tunceli and is also a protector of truth. If anyone has a problem (dava) with someone else and if he/she couldn't solve this problem with him/her, then he/she goes to the top of the mountain of Duzgın and he/she may wish for his help.

According to Alevi Zazas and Kurds of Tunceli, if a pious person doesn't have any sons and if he/she goes to the mountain of Bava Duzgın, Duzgın will give the person a chance to get a son. Mithra is known as 'sons-giver' (putro-da) in the Avesta. The people of Dersim pray to Duzgi in the time of first lights of the rising sun, like Mithra's followers. Mithra had been turned a sun god in later times, although he was originally a god of the sunlight.

Both Mithra and Duzgi are shepherds. Mithra is symbolized by an eagle. Duzgi has also such a symbol, Heliyo Chal. Both of them are warriors and riders and are dressed in red. Moreover, Mithra has a sister (Anahita), Duzgi too has a sister (Xaskar). Anahita is a goddess of the water and she symbolizes purity. Xaskar has a holy water source on the mountain of Duzgın. Called by her name; Xaskare. If someone, who has good heart, drinks from the water, then the water source can't be dried. This belief refers to Anahita whose name means spotless in Avestan (An-ahit). The name of Xaskar probably comes from Armenian oskrhat which means 'made of the gold' in Armenian. Because Anahid is mostly described with the golden dressing. Consequently, Xaskar and Duzgın might be personifications of Armenian Anahita and Mithra in this mountainous region, Tunceli.
