= Büyüknacar Merkez, Pazarcık =

Village in Kahramanmaraş Province, Turkey

Büyüknacar Merkez
- Neighbourhood
- Location in Turkey
- Coordinates: 37°36′50″N 37°17′32″E
- Country: Turkey
- Province: Kahramanmaraş
- District: Pazarcık
- Population (2022): 758
- Time zone: UTC+3 (TRT)

Büyüknacar Merkez is a neighbourhood of the municipality and district of Pazarcık, Kahramanmaraş Province, Turkey. Its population is 758 (2022). Before the 2013 reorganisation, Büyüknacar was a town (belde).
