= Hasan Yükselir =

Turkish singer and composer

Hasan Yükselir (born 1955, Pazarcık, Turkey) is a Turkish singer and composer, who predominantly performs Turkish folk songs (Türkü).

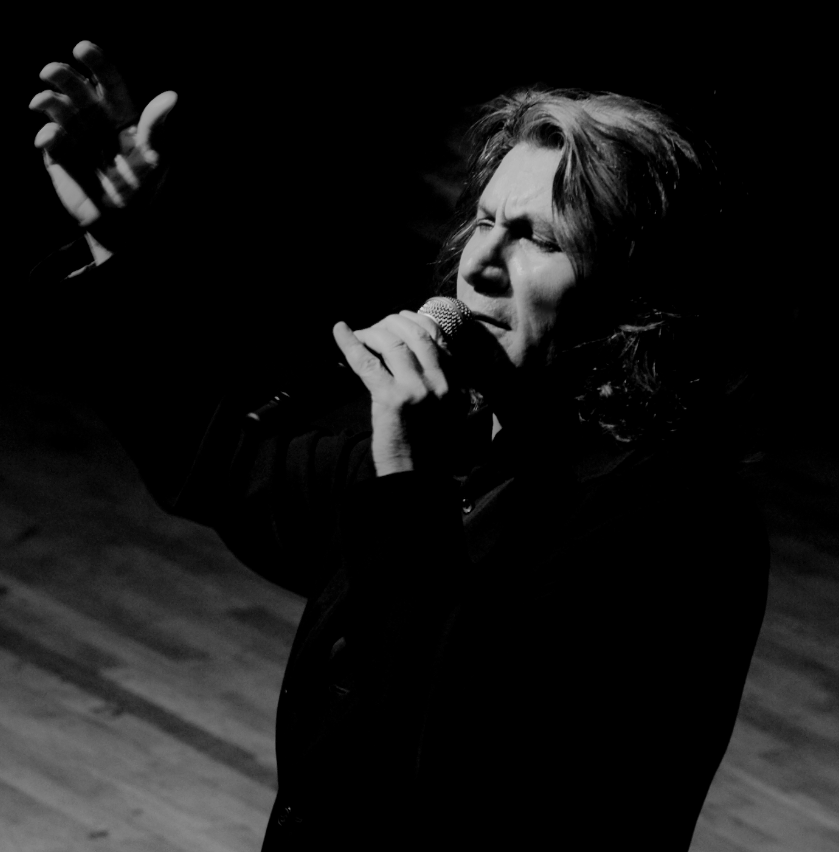
Turkish singer and composer, Hasan Yükselir

== Life ==
Hasan Yükselir was born in Pazarcık. He spent his childhood and adolescence in Gaziantep. Hasan Yükselir obtained a Bachelor in music from the Gazi University in Ankara and thereafter a Master's degree from the Faculty of Languages, History and Geography of Ankara University specializing in theatre. There, he received instruction in composition from Turgut Aldemir and singing classes from Sevim Çidamlı (soprano).

In 1984 Hasan Yükselir took a position at Ankara National Theatre. In 1993, at the age of 38, he relocated to Germany and since that time works primarily out of Berlin and Turkey. In 1981, his son Fırat Yükselir and in 1986 his daughter Dijle Yükselir were born. Both are well-known musicians in Turkey.

== Creative output and musical style ==
Hasan Yükselir predominantly composes and arranges traditional, Anatolian folk songs in both classical Western musical forms as well as in the idiom of jazz and interprets them with his classically trained voice. He performed in theatrical plays and in musicals, issued several musical albums, and composes film music for German and Turkish television, which includes the music for such films as Umut Sokağı (“Street of Hope”) by Şerif Gören and Uzun İnce bir Yol (“A Long, Narrow Road”) by Tunç Başaran.

The musical style of Hasan Yükselir was initially influenced by Ruhi Su, who, like Hasan Yükselir, had a powerful bass-bariton voice, and whose life and creative output also features many parallels to that of Hasan Yükselir, starting from their singing studies at the same conservatory, their common interest in opera as an art musical form of expression, to their shared political views.

The creative focus of Hasan Yükselir is the worldwide popularization of Anatolian song and of the poetry of well-known Turkish mystics and poets such as Yunus Emre and Nazım Hikmet through the medium of the fine arts and by cooperating with qualified, highly educated artists having a long-term commitment to their creative vision. In particular, he considers art music and an academic musical education as two key factors in the cultural development of music.

As such, he composed the „Concertino for Bağlamas & Orchester“ which was premiered in 1996 by the Cologne Symphony Orchestra. In 1997 followed the chamber opera „saw hands that bound roses in dark earth“ with poems by Yunus Emre, followed in 2002, after a 5 year research period, by the song cycle „Sevda Ateşten Gömlek“ based on poems by Nazım Hikmet.

In Germany, Hasan Yükselir's interpretation of Anatolian song (Türkü) is often compared to the lieder of Franz Schubert, and is often characterized by a confluence of motives from Anatolian folklore, epic song recitals, Renaissance-pieces and jazz-like interludes.

He performs in concerts and international song recitals on a European scale. Concerts in the Kölner Philharmonie (WDR), the Alten Oper Frankfurt as well as the Haus der Kulturen der Welt in Berlin constitute important stepping stones in his musical career.

== Discography ==
- 1992: Günler
- 1993: Konserlerim
- 1994: Ayrılık / Herkes Gibisin
- 1998: Su Türküler
- 2001: Göç Türküler
- 2002: Sevda Ateşten Gömlek / Nazım Şarkıları
- 2004: Ben Türküyüm
- 2014: Yel / Saz'dan Caz'a
