= Karabıyıklı, Pazarcık =

Village in Kahramanmaraş Province, Turkey

Karabıyıklı
- Neighbourhood
- Location within Turkey
- Coordinates: 37°18′9″N 37°11′12″E
- Country: Turkey
- Province: Kahramanmaraş
- District: Pazarcık
- Population (2022): 259
- Time zone: UTC+3 (TRT)

Karabıyıklı is a neighbourhood in the municipality and district of Pazarcık, Kahramanmaraş Province, Turkey. The village is inhabited by Sunni Turks and had a population of 259 in 2022.
