= Yumaklıcerit Cumhuriyet =

Village in Kahramanmaraş Province, Turkey

- Neighbourhood
- Location in Turkey
- Coordinates: 37°34′37″N 37°32′13″E
- Country: Turkey
- Province: Kahramanmaraş
- District: Pazarcık
- Population (2022): 1,312
- Time zone: UTC+3 (TRT)

Yumaklıcerit Cumhuriyet is a neighbourhood of the municipality and district of Pazarcık, Kahramanmaraş Province, Turkey. Its population is 1,312 (2022). Before the 2013 reorganisation, Yumaklıcerit was a town (belde). It is inhabited by Sunni Turks.
