= Salmanlı, Sabirabad =

Salmanlı
- Municipality
- Location within Azerbaijan
- Coordinates: 39°41′19″N 48°56′49″E
- Country: Azerbaijan
- Rayon: Sabirabad

Population
  - Total: 765
- Time zone: UTC+4 (AZT)
  - Summer (DST): UTC+5 (AZT)

Salmanlı (also, Mashad-Salmanly and Salmanly) is a village and municipality in the Sabirabad Rayon of Azerbaijan. It has a population of 765.
