= Maraş massacre =

1978 Pogrom of Alevi Kurds by Turkish Ultranationalists

- Part of the political violence in Turkey in 1976–80
- Location: Kahramanmaras, Turkey
- Date: December 1978
- Target: Leftists and Alevi Kurds
- Attack type: Pogrom, Right-wing terrorism, Deep State terrorism
- Deaths: 105–111
- Perpetrators: Turkish Secret Service (according to the PM Ecevit), Grey Wolves
- Motive: Far-right extremism, Alleged deep-state provocation of Alevi–Sunni conflict to destabilize Turkey and justify the 1980 coup

The Maraş massacre (Turkish: Maraş katliamı; Kurdish: Komkujiya Mereşê) was the massacre of more than one hundred leftists and Kurdish Alevis in the city of Kahramanmaraş, Turkey, in December 1978, allegedly by the neo-fascist Grey Wolves and National Intelligence Organization of Turkey.

Martial law was declared after the massacre, but this did not halt a campaign of violence elsewhere including in cities like Çorum and Konya.

== Background ==
The events in Kahramanmaraş lasted from 19 to 26 December 1978. It started with a bomb thrown into a cinema attended mostly by right-wingers. Rumors spread that left-wingers had thrown the bomb. The next day, a bomb was thrown into a coffee shop frequented by left-wingers. In the evening of 21 December 1978 the teachers Hacı Çolak and Mustafa Yüzbaşıoğlu, known as left-wingers, were killed on their way home. Their funeral was to take place the next day but armed clashes erupted outside the mosque where prayers were to be held, preventing the ceremony. By the end of the day, three people were killed and property and workplaces destroyed.

== Massacre ==
Over the next five days, over a hundred people were killed, a majority being women and children who were killed in cold blood at home. Parts of Maraş were destroyed and a curfew was subsequently instated in the city. Neither the army nor the police attempted to stop the actions. On 23 December, crowds stormed the quarters where Alevis were living, attacking people and destroying houses and shops. Many offices, including that of the Confederation of Progressive Trade Unions of Turkey (DİSK), Teachers' Association of Turkey (TÖB-Der), Association of Police Officers (Pol-Der) and Republican People's Party (CHP), were destroyed. By 26 December, the city and situation was brought under control and the government placed thirteen provinces under martial law. Most of the victims were from the small population of Kurdish Alevis in Sunni-populated areas in the city. The Alevis were migrants from Tunceli.

During the trial witnesses testified that victims were frequently asked by their assailants to prove that they were Muslim and Turkish.

== Victims ==
The figures on casualties vary slightly. The Independent Communication Network Bianet claim that 111 people were killed, while the daily Zaman puts the death toll at 105.

== Aftermath ==
Opinions of witnesses include the following observations:

Şeyho Demir: "The Maraş Police Chief at the time was Abdülkadir Aksu. The massacre was organised by the Turkish secret service MIT, the Nationalist Movement Party (MHP) and the Islamists together... As soon as I heard about the massacre, I went to Maraş. In the morning I went to Maraş State Hospital. There, I met a nurse I knew... When she saw me, she was surprised: 'Şeyho, where have you come from? They are killing everyone here. They have taken at least ten lightly-wounded people from the hospital downstairs and killed them.' This was done under the control of the head physician of the Maraş State Hospital. The lawyer Halil Güllüoglu followed the Maraş massacre case. The files he had were never made public. He was killed for pursuing the case anyway."

Meryem Polat: "They started in the morning, burning all the houses, and continued into the afternoon. A child was burned in a boiler. They sacked everything. We were in the water in the cellar, above us were wooden boards. The boards were burning and falling on top of us. My house was reduced to ashes. We were with eight people in the cellar; they did not see us and left."

== Trials ==
The court cases, opened at military courts, lasted until 1991 when Anti Terror Law enacted. A total of 804 defendants were put on trial. The courts issued 29 death penalties and sentenced seven defendants to life imprisonment and 321 others to sentences between one and 24 years of imprisonment. All of the defendants were released by 1992 thanks to a law passed the previous year.

== Potential perpetrators ==
Hasan Fehmi Güneş, who was appointed Interior Minister after the incidents, is convinced that the massacre was planned. Ruşen Sümbüloğlu, chair of the "Association of Persons from 1968" in Ankara, claimed that the Counter-Guerrilla was behind the provocation. Fevzi Gümüş, chair of the "Cultural Association Pir Sultan Abdal" claimed that the CIA and the deep state must have been involved. Turan Eser, President of the "Alevi Bektaşi Federation", spoke at the 29th anniversary of the massacre in Maraş. He alleged that before the events,

"counter guerrilla and racist paramilitary imperialist henchmen made efforts to spread the seeds of hatred between those, who were citizens of the same country and had lived together in peace for centuries".

A secret document revealed by Ecevit in 2006 showed that the Turkish secret service had planned the incidents.

Ökkeş Şendiller, who had been on trial for being involved in the incident, later became a member of parliament, and was involved in the foundation of the Turkish nationalist Great Union Party (BBP). In 2007, the radio station Voice of Free Radio and Folk Songs (Turkish: Özgür Radyo ve Türkülerin Sesi Radyosu) broadcast a program, in which Ökkeş Şendiller was interviewed over the phone. Passages of the conversation with Hasan Harmancı are (only quotes from ÖŞ):

"I was chosen as victim. I saw the most horrible torture. The teachers that were killed, were not Alevi. They were left-wing Sunnis. There were clashes, in which people of both sides were killed... I am talking about court documents. They say that the organization Revolutionary War (Turkish: Devrimci Savaş) threw the bomb."

On 30 April 2011, Hamit Kapan, an alleged member of Devrimci Savaş, who had been held incommunicado for 300 days while two friends of his were tortured to death, accused General Yusuf Haznedaroğlu, responsible for martial law in Kahramanmaraş, of being responsible for the torture.

== See also ==
- List of massacres in Turkey
- Sivas massacre
- 1980 Turkish coup d'état
- Martial law and state of emergency in Turkey
- Constantinople pogroms
