= Ağcaşar Dam =

Dam in Kayseri, Turkey

Coordinates: 38.1627°N 35.3863°E

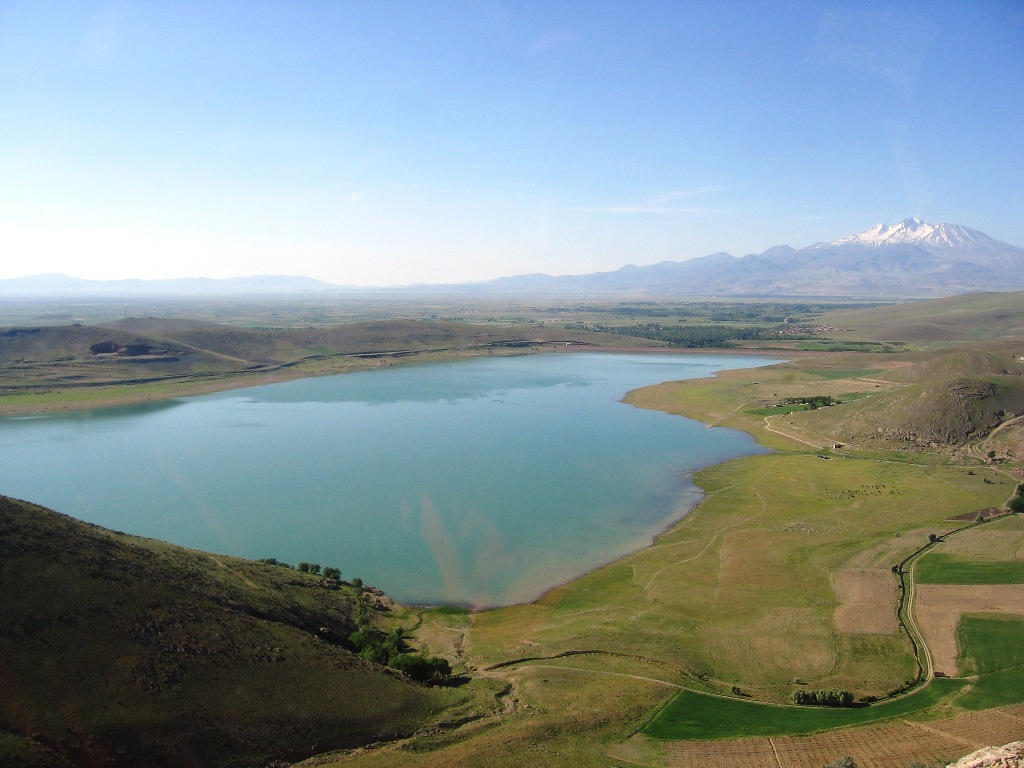
- Interactive map of Ağcaşar Dam
- Location: Turkey

Dam and spillways
- Height (thalweg): 30 metres (98 ft)

Ağcaşar Dam is a dam in Kayseri Province, Turkey, built between 1979 and 1987. The dam creates a lake which covers an area of 4 km ² and irrigates 15,500 hectares.

== See also ==
- List of dams and reservoirs in Turkey
