= Elbistan =

- District and municipality

- Logo

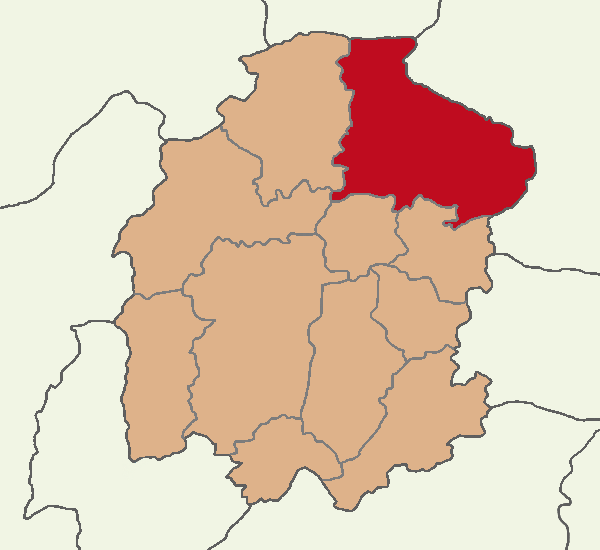
- Map showing Elbistan District in Kahramanmaraş Province

- Location within Turkey
- Coordinates: 38°12′05″N 37°11′18″E
- Country: Turkey
- Province: Kahramanmaraş

Government
  - Mayor: Erkan Gürbüz (CHP)
- Area: 2,201 km^{2} (850 sq mi)
- Elevation: 1,150 m (3,770 ft)
- Population (2022): 141,307
  - Density: 64.20/km^{2} (166.3/sq mi)
- Time zone: UTC+3 (TRT)
- Postal code: 46300
- Area code: 0344
- Website: www.elbistan.bel.tr

Elbistan (Old Anatolian Turkish: Ablasta, Ablastayn, Ablastin, Ablistan; Arabic: البستان (Al-Bustan)) is a municipality and district of Kahramanmaraş Province, Turkey. Its area is 2,201 km^{2}, and its population is 141,307 (2022).

== Etymology ==
The name "Elbistan" was pronounced similarly in Byzantine and Islamic sources. Elbistan was known as Plasta and Plastentia (Greek: Πλαστεντία) in antiquity. Elbistan was known as Ablasta (Armenian: Աբլաստա) according to Armenian historians in the early 11th century. According to Baldric of Dol the city was known as "Ablistan" till 15th century. Egyptian-Mamluk historian Muhammad ibn Iyas wrote the city's name as "Albistan". Alaüddevle Bozkurt Bey from Dulkadirids used the name "Elbistan" in the official documents. After Dulkadirids were conquered by the Ottoman Empire in the 16th century, the current name became prevalent. Among the rural people of Elbistan it is pronounced as "Albıstan". Albistan means "the orchard" in Arabic.

== History ==
The settlement of the Elbistan plain around the town of Elbistan goes back to prehistoric times. In 1947, an important Anatolian hieroglyphic inscription stele was discovered near the village of Karahüyük (Elbistan), which is located 9 km northwest from Elbistan town. This stele is believed to be from the 12th century BC.

In the mid-10th century, modern settlement of the area began. The town seems to have been settled first by Armenian immigrants. By the end of the 11th century, the town had become the most important one in the Elbistan plain, was fortified against Turkish raiders and was seat of an Armenian bishop. When the army of the First Crusade passed through Anatolia recovering land for the Byzantine Empire in 1097, Peter Aliphas was installed as governor of Plastentia. According to Matthew of Edessa, in 1155-1156 the ruler of Cappadocia, Yaqub Arslan, took people of Lykandos, and then uprooted the whole Christian population of Plastentia and nearby Gaihan, 70,000 in total, and settled them in his lands. As a result, Plastentia was heavily depopulated.

In 1256-1257, the Mongol Baidju slew 7,000 of the inhabitants of Elbistan and carried off the young men and women. In 1277 the Mamluks led by Baybars defeated a Mongol army in the Battle of Elbistan. Thereafter, Elbistan and the region around it became part of the Mamluk northern frontier. In 1337 Zeyneddin Karaca Bey captured the town from the Mamluks and established the Beylik of Dulkadir with the region around Elbistan and Marash as its center. Nevertheless, Dulkadirids continued to pay homage to the Mamluks and fought with the Karamandids to defend Mamluk interests though they sought for more autonomy. The Dulkadirids controlled the region for 178 years until the Ottomans finally conquered it in 1515.

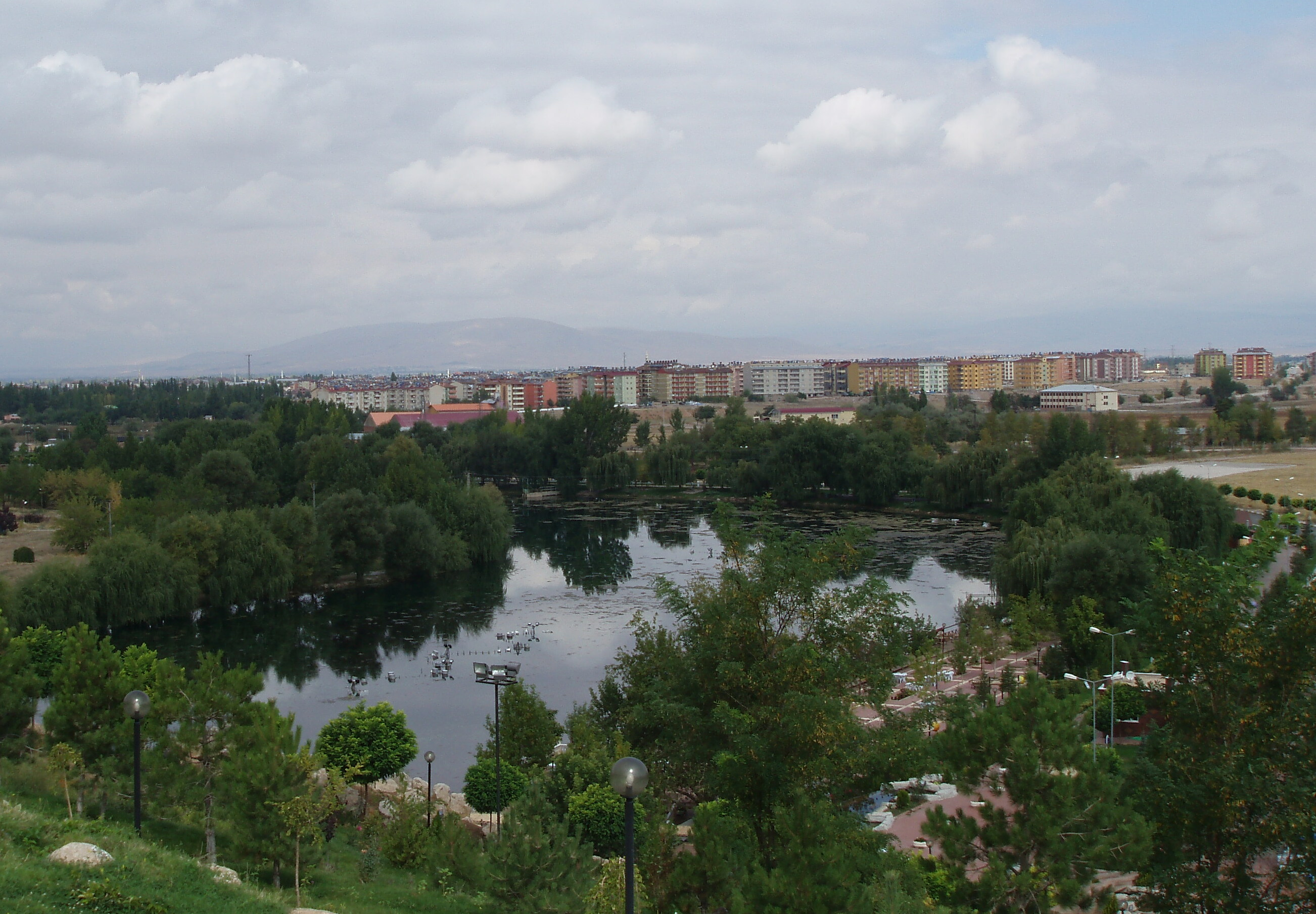
Pınarbaşı Pond in Elbistan

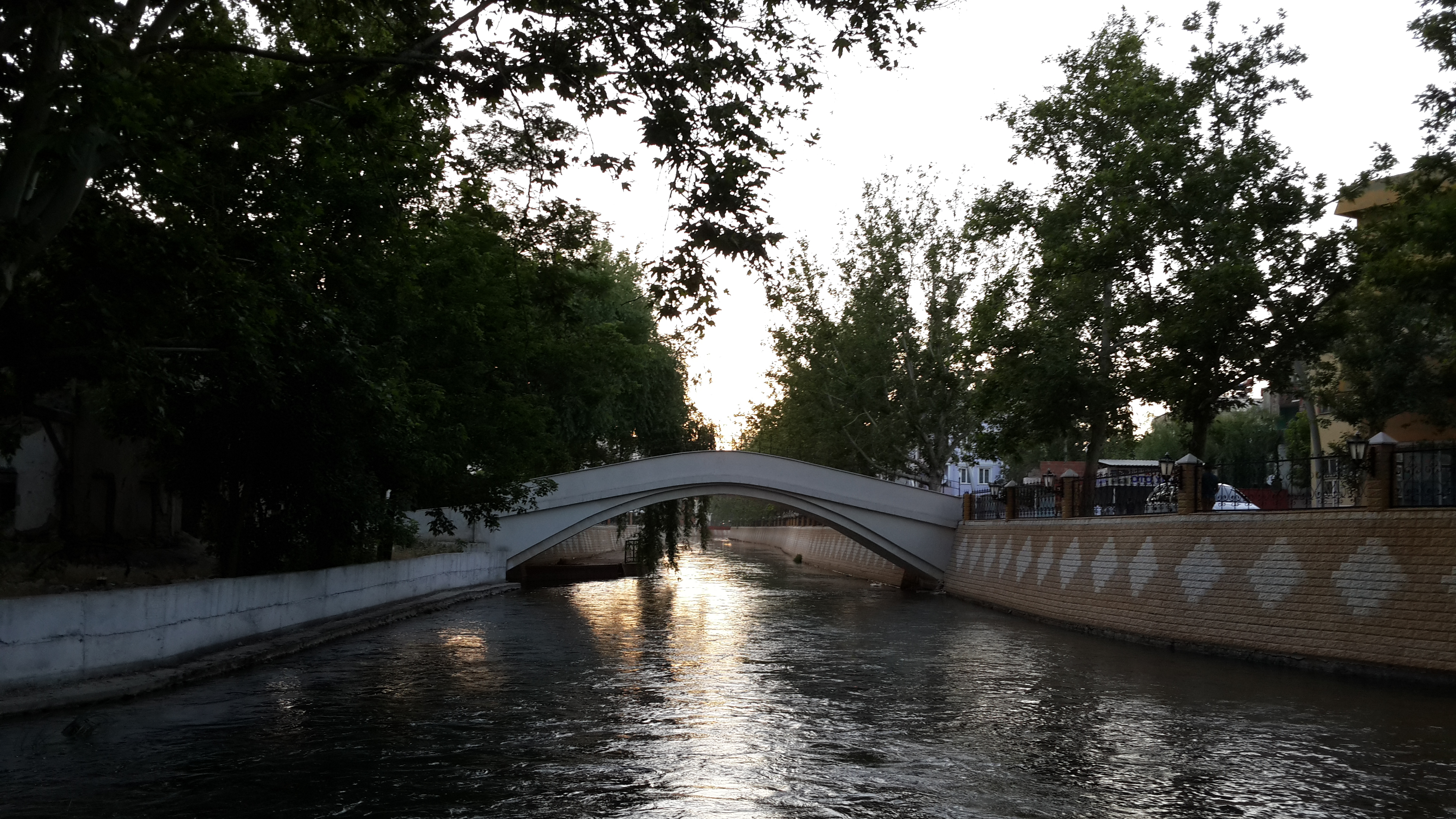
Ceyhan River

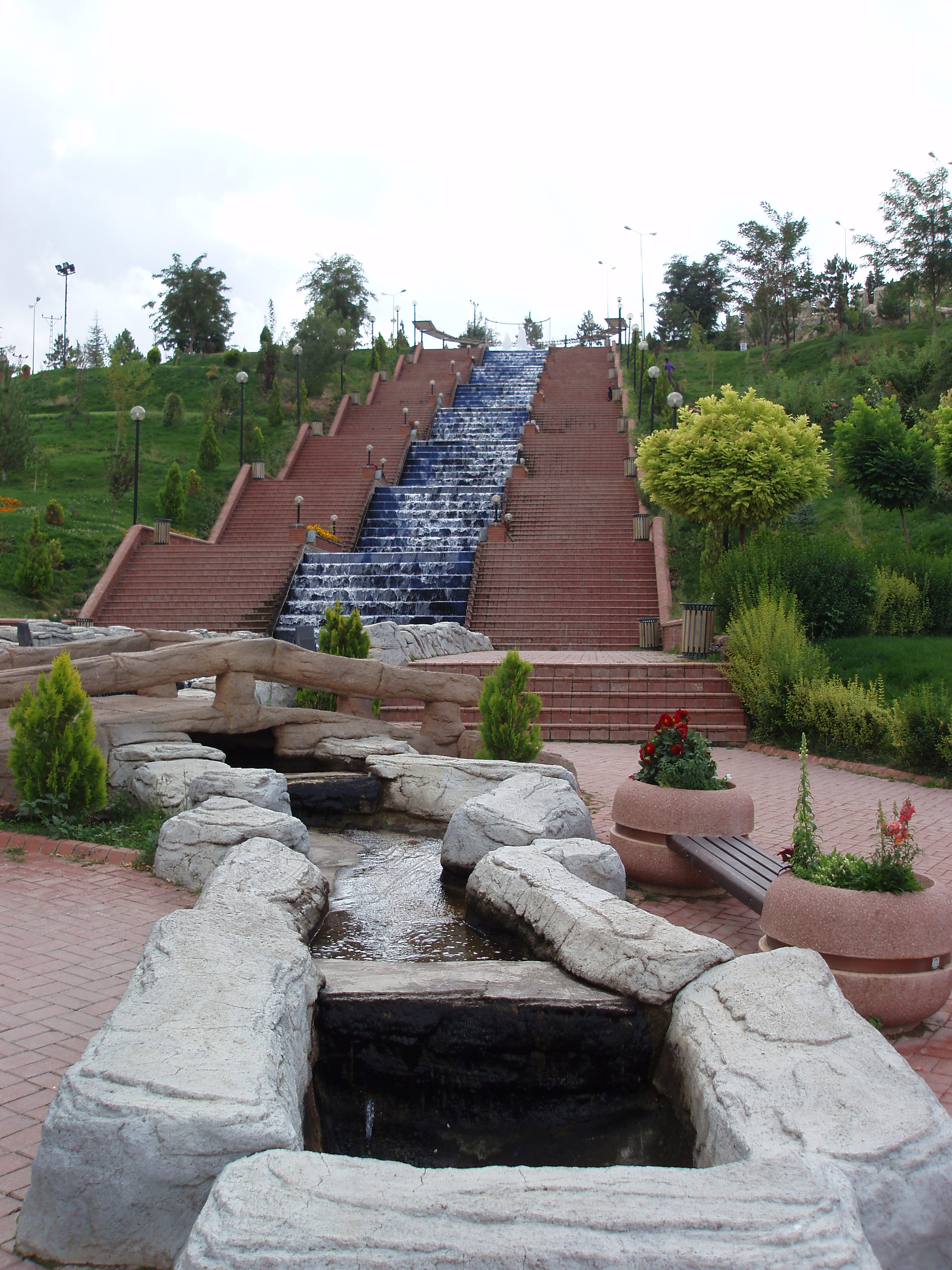
Pınarbaşı park in Elbistan

Elbistan became then known as "vilayet-i Türkmân" in the Ottoman documents. Evliya Çelebi's Seyahatnâme from the 17th century gives information about the region that in the mountains and towns mostly reside Turkmens who originally migrated from Bukhara. It seems that some local chiefdoms were given varying degrees of autonomy, notably around the localities of Haticepınar and Kasanlı.

== Demographics ==
Evliya Çelebi noted that the majority of the town's population was Turkoman in his seyahatname. Currently, the majority of the population of the district is Sunni Turkish with a significant Alevi and Sunni Kurdish population of approximately 10,000. Turkish Alevis are also present. The Turkmen Alevism of the region is historically rooted in the Alevi Turcoman Beylik of Dulkadir in the 14th century.

== Climate ==
Elbistan has a fairly dry climate with cold winters and hot, dry summers. Elbistan's climate is classified as a dry-summer continental climate (Köppen: Dsa).

Climate data for Elbistan (1991–2020)
Month	Jan	Feb	Mar	Apr	May	Jun	Jul	Aug	Sep	Oct	Nov	Dec	Year
Mean daily maximum °C (°F)	3.2 (37.8)	5.8 (42.4)	11.8 (53.2)	17.7 (63.9)	22.9 (73.2)	28.3 (82.9)	32.5 (90.5)	32.9 (91.2)	28.4 (83.1)	21.5 (70.7)	12.6 (54.7)	5.7 (42.3)	18.7 (65.7)
Daily mean °C (°F)	−1.8 (28.8)	0.1 (32.2)	5.6 (42.1)	11.0 (51.8)	15.5 (59.9)	20.3 (68.5)	24.1 (75.4)	24.1 (75.4)	19.2 (66.6)	13.0 (55.4)	5.4 (41.7)	0.6 (33.1)	11.5 (52.7)
Mean daily minimum °C (°F)	−6.0 (21.2)	−4.8 (23.4)	−.2 (31.6)	4.2 (39.6)	8.0 (46.4)	11.4 (52.5)	14.3 (57.7)	14.2 (57.6)	9.7 (49.5)	5.5 (41.9)	0.0 (32.0)	−3.3 (26.1)	4.5 (40.1)
Average precipitation mm (inches)	39.95 (1.57)	37.72 (1.49)	45.19 (1.78)	51.44 (2.03)	44.19 (1.74)	18.38 (0.72)	4.28 (0.17)	2.42 (0.10)	12.22 (0.48)	46.89 (1.85)	42.46 (1.67)	39.86 (1.57)	385.0 (15.16)
Average precipitation days (≥ 1.0 mm)	6.2	6.4	6.8	7.3	6.9	3.5	1.7	1.5	2.4	5.4	5.6	6.2	59.9
Average relative humidity (%)	73.7	69.3	62.2	58.2	58.0	52.8	47.7	48.2	50.7	61.6	69.2	74.4	60.5
Source: NOAA

== Economy ==
The Elbistan coalfield supplies lignite to the nearby Afşin-Elbistan power stations in Afşin.

== Environment ==
It is said that air pollution in Turkey from the nearby coal-fired power stations also affects Elbistan, as well as smoke from landfill. In late 2020 the oldest plant Afşin-Elbistan A, was said by opposition MP Ali Öztunç to be still operating without filters.

== Composition ==
There are 92 neighbourhoods in Elbistan District:

- Ağlıca
- Akarca
- Akbayır
- Akören
- Aksakal
- Alembey
- Alkayaoğlu
- Armutalan
- Atmalıkaşanlı
- Bahçelievler
- Bakış
- Balıkçıl
- Battalgazi
- Beştepe
- Beyyurdu
- Büyükyapalak
- Çalış
- Çatova
- Ceyhan
- Çiçekköy
- Çıtlık
- Cumhuriyet
- Demircilik
- Dervişçimli
- Doğan
- Eldelek
- Elmalı
- Esentepe
- Evcihüyük
- Fakıoğlu
- Geçit
- Gökçek
- Gücük
- Gümüşdöven
- Günaltı
- Gündere
- Güneşli
- Güplüce
- Güvercinlik
- Hacıhasanlı
- Hasanalili
- Hasankendi
- Horhor
- İğde
- İkizpınarı
- İncecik
- Izgın
- Kalaycık
- Kalealtı
- Kangal
- Kantarma
- Karaelbistan
- Karahasanuşağı
- Karahüyük
- Karamağara
- Kavaktepe
- Kayageçit
- Keçemağara
- Kışlaköy
- Kızılcıoba
- Köprübaşı
- Körücek
- Köseyahya
- Köşkköy
- Küçükyapalak
- Kümbet
- Orhangazi
- Ovacık
- Özbek
- Özcanlı
- Pınarbaşı
- Sarıyatak
- Sevdili
- Söğütlü
- Sünnetköy
- Tapkıran
- Tapkırankale
- Taşburun
- Tepebaşı
- Topallı
- Toprakhisar
- Türkören
- Uncular
- Uzunpınar
- Yalakköy
- Yalıntaş
- Yapılı
- Yapılıpınar
- Yapraklı
- Yeşilyurt
- Yoğunsöğüt
- Yunusemre

== Notable people ==
- Mustafa Atici, Swiss politician of Kurdish descent
- Mazlum Çimen, ballet dancer, award-winning film score composer and folk singer
- Fidan Doğan, murdered Kurdish activist
- Tulay Goren, missing Kurdish schoolgirl
- Kemal Gözükara, mathematician, businessman and president of the Istanbul Arel University
- Mahir Ünal, Turkish MP and former minister of Culture and Tourism
- Tahsin Yücel, Turkish translator, novelist, essayist and literary critic
