= Çağlayancerit =

- District and municipality
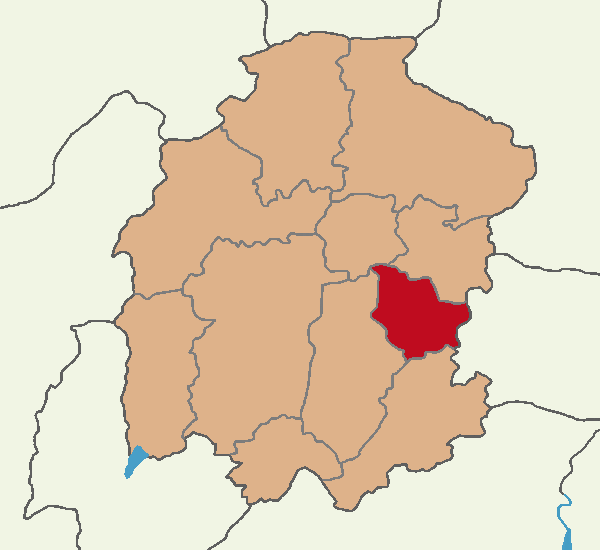
- Map showing Çağlayancerit District in Kahramanmaraş Province

- Location in Turkey
- Coordinates: 37°45′02″N 37°17′35″E
- Country: Turkey
- Province: Kahramanmaraş

Government
  - Mayor: Yemliha Göktaş (Independent)
- Area: 470 km^{2} (180 sq mi)
- Elevation: 1,150 m (3,770 ft)
- Population (2022): 22,350
  - Density: 48/km^{2} (120/sq mi)
- Time zone: UTC+3 (TRT)
- Postal code: 46720
- Area code: 0344
- Website: www.caglayancerit.bel.tr

Çağlayancerit is a municipality and district of Kahramanmaraş Province, Turkey. Its area is 470 km^{2}, and its population is 22,350 (2022).

== Etymology ==
The name of the district comes from the Turkoman tribe of Jerid (Cerit in Turkish).

== Composition ==
There are 19 neighbourhoods in Çağlayancerit District:

- Akdere
- Aksu
- Bayırlı
- Bölükdamlar
- Boylu
- Bozlar
- Emiruşağı
- Engizek
- Fatih
- Helete Cumhuriyet
- Helete Karadağ
- Helete Yeşiloba
- Istiklal
- Kaleköy
- Küçükcerit
- Küçüküngüt
- Oruçpınar
- Soğukpınar
- Zeynepuşağı

== 2009 helicopter crash ==
On March 25, 2009, Great Union Party's (BBP) leader Muhsin Yazıcıoğlu came to Çağlayancerit at 13:00 EET (11:00 UCT) by a chartered helicopter to hold a speech at his party's rally ahead of the local elections. After the rally at the town's square before 1,500 people gathered, he left at 14:42 local time with the same helicopter carrying his party's three other local politicians and a reporter to head for another rally in Yerköy, Yozgat Province.

The helicopter crashed at Mount Keş in Göksun district killing the pilot and four passengers, among them Yazıcıoğlu. The reporter survived with injuries and made an emergency call reporting the accident. Subsequent search and rescue operations, conducted by thousands of people and assisted by several helicopters, succeeded to recover the wreckage and the five bodies only three days later due to advert weather conditions in the region. The reporter's corpse was finally found two more days later far from the crash site.
