= Helete =

Settlement in Turkey

Helete Düzbağ
- Neighbourhood
- Location in Turkey
- Coordinates: 37°48′N 37°28′E
- Country: Turkey
- Province: Kahramanmaraş
- District: Çağlayancerit
- Elevation: 930 m (3,050 ft)
- Population (2022): 4,248
- Time zone: UTC+3 (TRT)

Helete (formerly: Düzbağ) is a neighbourhood of the municipality and district of Çağlayancerit, Kahramanmaraş Province, Turkey. Its population is 4,248 (2022). Before the 2013 reorganisation, it was a town (belde). It is subdivided into three mahalle: Cumhuriyet, Karadağ and Yeşiloba.

== Geography ==
Helete is situated at the southern foothill of a mountain. The altitude of the midtown is 930 metres (3,050 ft). The highway distance to Çağlayancerit is 17 kilometres (11 mi) and to Kahramanmaraş is 117 kilometres (73 mi).

== History ==
No record survives from the 15th century when the settlement was a part of Dulkadirids. The settlement was annexed by the Ottoman Empire during the reign of Selim I in 1517. According to a census soon after the annexation, the name of the village was shown as Helete and the population of Helete was found out to be 200. In 1968 the village was declared a township named Düzbağ.

== Economy ==
The traditional economic activity is animal husbandry. The main agricultural crops are fruits, especially grapes and apples. There is also a small carpet weaving factory. Since the 1960s Düzbağ residents who migrated to Germany as industrial workers (gastarbeiter) have also contributed to the town's economy.
