= Ekinözü =

- District and municipality
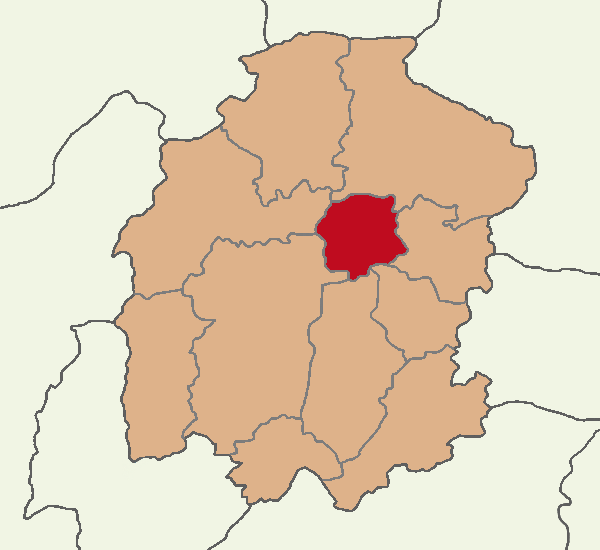
- Map showing Ekinözü District in Kahramanmaraş Province

- Location in Turkey
- Coordinates: 38°03′42″N 37°11′34″E
- Country: Turkey
- Province: Kahramanmaraş

Government
  - Mayor: Harun Vicdan (CHP)
- Area: 656 km^{2} (253 sq mi)
- Population (2022): 10,290
  - Density: 16/km^{2} (41/sq mi)
- Time zone: UTC+3 (TRT)
- Postal code: 46360
- Area code: 0344
- Website: www.ekinozu.bel.tr

Ekinözü (Kurdish: Cela) is a municipality and district of Kahramanmaraş Province, Turkey. Its area is 656 km^{2}, and its population is 10,290 (2022).

The town was 5.5 km (3.4 mi) north of the epicenter of a M_{ww} 7.5 earthquake on 6 February 2023—the latter of two large earthquakes the same day. At least 11 people died, 107 houses were destroyed and 70 percent of the town's building stock were damaged by the earthquakes.

== Composition ==
There are 21 neighbourhoods in Ekinözü District:

- Akpınar
- Alişar
- Altınyaprak
- Anbar
- Ataköy
- Çiftlikkale
- Çiftlikköy
- Demirlik
- Gaziler
- Gözpınar
- İçmeler
- Kabaktepe
- Kandilköy
- Kürtül
- Maarif
- Ortaören
- Öztürk
- Soysallı
- Türkeli
- Türkmenler
- Yeniköy
