= Türkoğlu =

- District and municipality
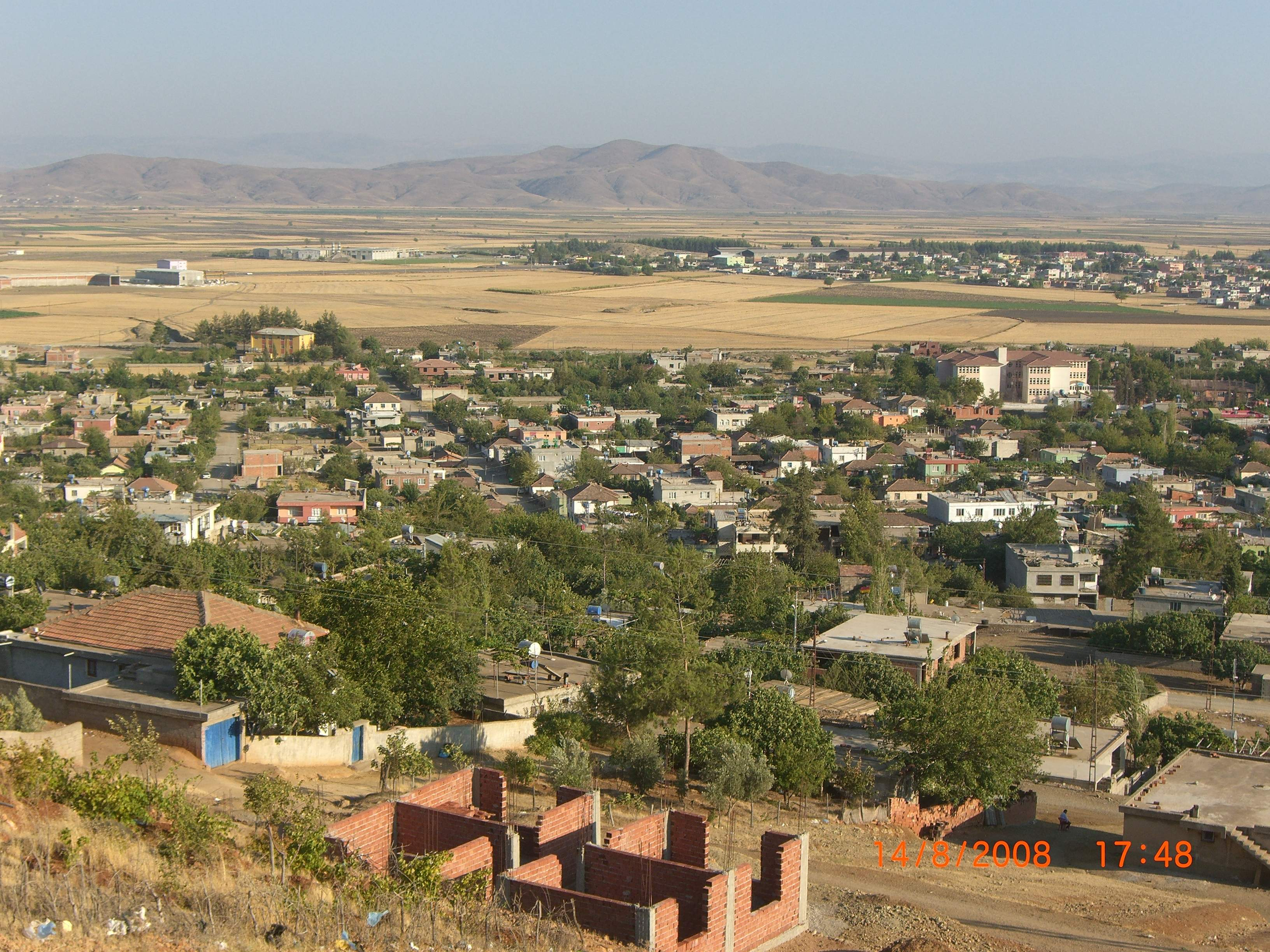

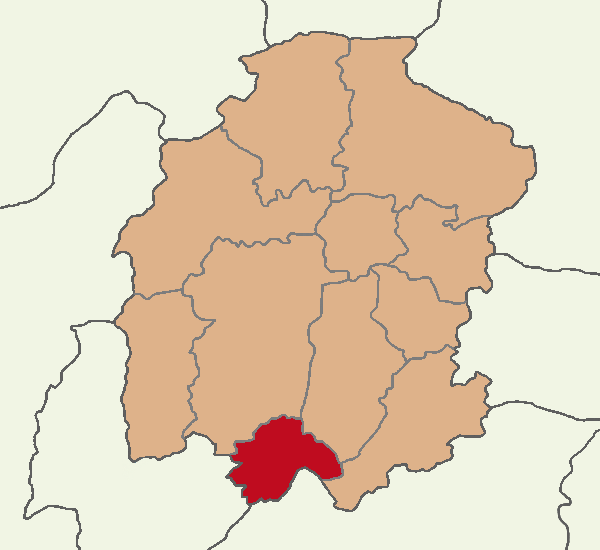
- Map showing Türkoğlu District in Kahramanmaraş Province

- Location within Turkey
- Coordinates: 37°23′29″N 36°51′08″E
- Country: Turkey
- Province: Kahramanmaraş

Government
  - Mayor: Mehmet Karaca (YRP)
- Area: 660 km^{2} (250 sq mi)
- Elevation: 490 m (1,610 ft)
- Population (2022): 78,976
  - Density: 120/km^{2} (310/sq mi)
- Time zone: UTC+3 (TRT)
- Postal code: 46800
- Area code: 0344
- Website: www.turkoglu.bel.tr

Türkoğlu is a municipality and district of Kahramanmaraş Province, Turkey. Its area is 660 km^{2}, and its population is 78,976 (2022).

== Composition ==
There are 44 neighbourhoods in Türkoğlu District:

- Akçalı
- Avşarlı
- Aydınkavak
- Bayramgazi
- Beyoğlu
- Çakalıhasanağa
- Çakallıçullu
- Çakıroğlu
- Ceceli
- Cennetpınarı
- Çobantepe
- Cumhuriyet
- Dedeler
- Doluca
- Fatih
- Gaziler
- Gaziosmanpaşa
- Güllühüyük
- Hacıbebek
- Hopurlu
- İmalı
- İstasyon
- Kadıoğluçiftliği
- Kaledibi
- Kelibişler
- Kılılı
- Kırmakaya
- Kızıleniş
- Küçükimalı
- Kumçatı
- Kuyumcular
- Minehüyük
- Örsenhopuru
- Özbek
- Pınarhüyük
- Şekeroba
- Tahtalıdedeler
- Uzunsöğüt
- Yavuzlar
- Yeniköy
- Yenipınar
- Yeşilyöre
- Yeşilyurt
- Yolderesi
