= Pazarcık =

Town in Kahramanmaraş Province, Turkey

- District and municipality
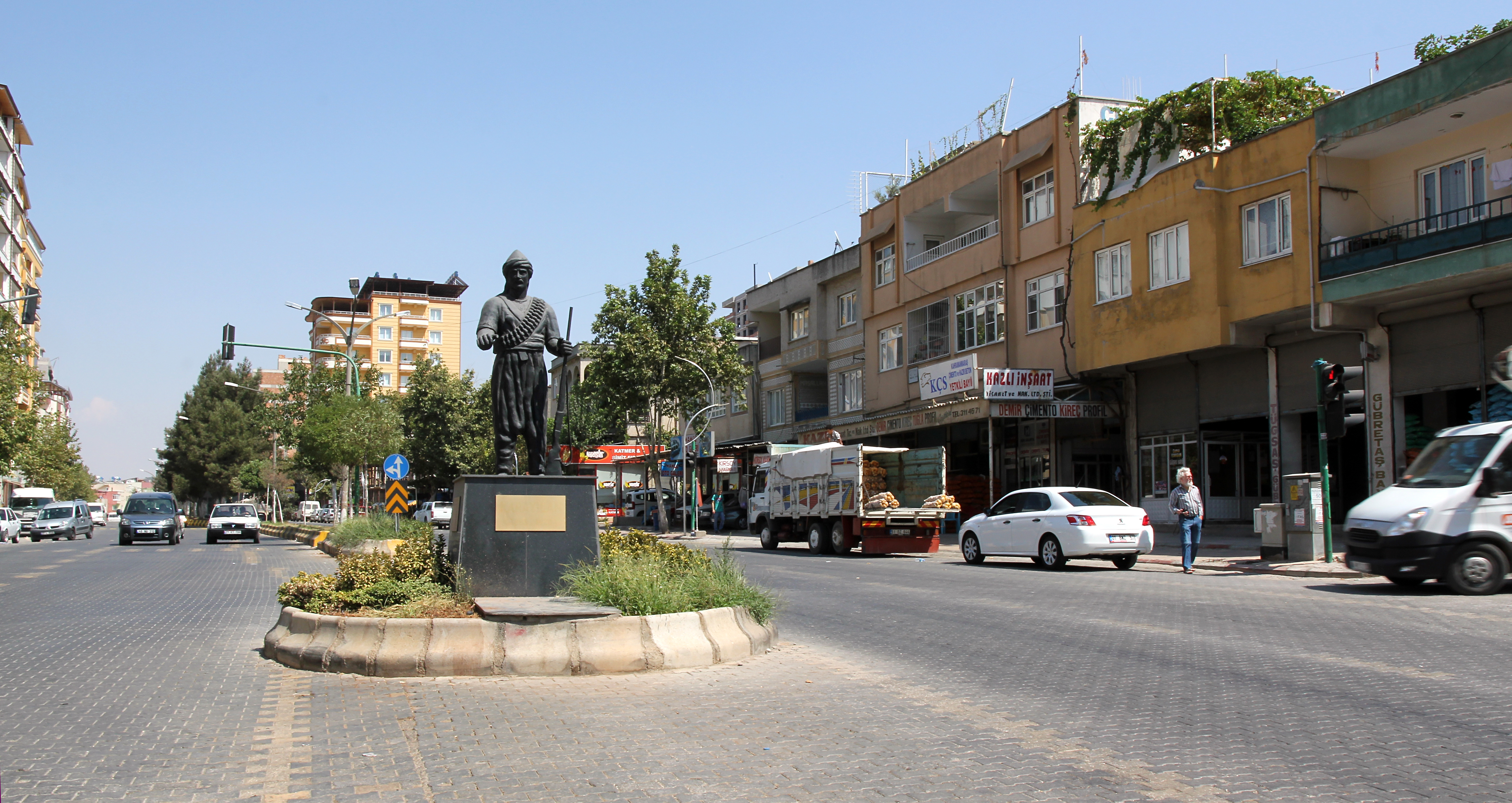

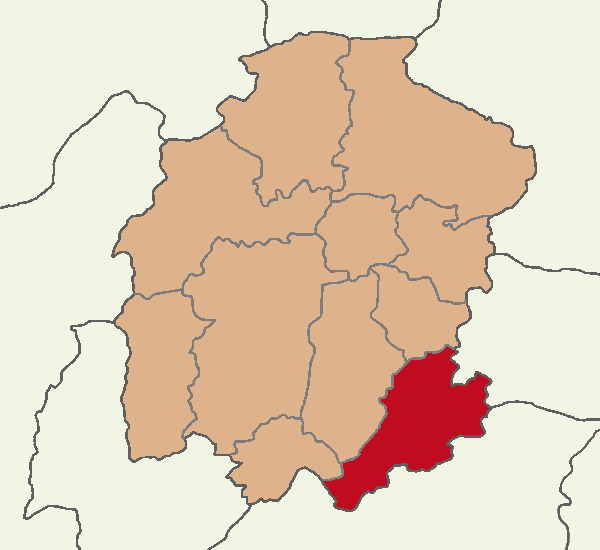
- Map showing Pazarcık District in Kahramanmaraş Province

- Location within Turkey
- Coordinates: 37°29′22″N 37°17′48″E
- Country: Turkey
- Province: Kahramanmaraş

Government
  - Mayor: Haydar İkizer (CHP)
- Area: 1,253 km^{2} (484 sq mi)
- Population (2022): 70,173
  - Density: 56.00/km^{2} (145.0/sq mi)
- Time zone: UTC+3 (TRT)
- Postal code: 46700
- Area code: 0344
- Website: www.pazarcik.bel.tr

Pazarcık (Kurdish: Bazarcix) is a municipality and district of Kahramanmaraş Province, Turkey. Its area is 1,253 km^{2}, and its population is 70,173 (2022). It is in the southeastern part of the province. The cement plant is a major source of greenhouse gas. The town is home to a large Alevi Kurdish population and also includes Abdals of the Kara Hüseyinler tribe.

On 6 February 2023, a magnitude 7.8 earthquake struck Pazarcık.

== Composition ==
There are 84 neighbourhoods in Pazarcık District:

- 15 Temmuz
- Ahmet Bozdağ
- Akçakoyunlu
- Akçalar
- Akdemir
- Armutlu
- Aşağımülk
- Bağdınısağır
- Beşçeşme
- Bölükçam
- Büyüknacar Fatih
- Büyüknacar Kocadere
- Büyüknacar Merkez
- Çamlıca
- Çamlıtepe
- Cengiz Topel
- Çiçek
- Çiçekalanı
- Çiğdemtepe
- Cimikanlı
- Çöçelli
- Damlataş
- Dedepaşa
- Eğlen
- Eğrice
- Emiroğlu
- Evri Pınarbaşı
- Evri Taşbiçme
- Fatih
- Ganidağıketiler
- Göçer
- Göynük
- Hanobası
- Harmancık
- Hasankoca
- Hürriyet
- İncirli
- Kadıncık
- Karaağaç
- Karabıyıklı
- Karaçay
- Karagöl
- Karahüyük
- Keleş
- Kizirli
- Kızkapanlı
- Kuzeykent
- Mehmet Emin Arıkoğlu
- Memiş Özdal
- Memişkahya
- Menderes
- Mezraa
- Musolar
- Narlı Bahçelievler
- Narlı Cumhuriyet
- Narlı İsmetpaşa
- Nefsidoğanlı
- Ördekdede
- Osmandede
- Sadakalar
- Şahintepe
- Sakarkaya
- Sallıuşağı
- Salmanıpak
- Salmanlı
- Sarıerik
- Sarıl
- Şehit Nurettin Ademoğlu
- Soku
- Sultanlar
- Taşdemir
- Tetirlik
- Tilkiler
- Turunçlu
- Ufacıklı
- Ulubahçe
- Yarbaşı
- Yeşilkent
- Yiğitler
- Yolboyu
- Yukarıhöcüklü
- Yukarımülk
- Yumaklıcerit Bağlar
- Yumaklıcerit Cumhuriyet

== Notable natives ==
- Ferruh Bozbeyli (1927–2019), Turkish politician.
- Hasan Yükselir (1955–), Turkish singer and composer.
- Dilber Ay (1956–2019), Turkish singer.
- KC Rebell (1988–), German rapper of Kurdish origin.
- Ahmet Aksu (1887–1954), Turkish politician
- Agit Kabayel (originally from there; 1992-), German boxer
