= Kurdish Alevism =

Kurdish religious group

Kurdish Alevism (Kurdish: Rêya Heqî, lit. 'The Path of God/Truth' or Elewîtî) refers to the unique rituals, sacred place practices, mythological discourses and socio-religious organizations among Kurds who adhere to Alevism. Kurdish Alevis consider their hereditary sacred lineages as semi-deific figures, often have beliefs more rooted in nature veneration, and put more emphasis on Pir Sultan Abdal as their religious symbol, unlike Turkish Alevis who emphasize the role of Haji Bektash Veli. Some Kurdish Alevis argue that their beliefs are related to Yarsanism and Yazidism.

The Kurdish Alevi population has experienced religious and ethnic discrimination, oppression and forced assimilation which have significantly impacted their identity. Two Kurdish Alevi rebellions were crushed by Turkish forces in the 20th century; the Koçgiri rebellion in 1921 and the Dersim rebellion in 1937–1938. Kurdish Alevis were also the main victims of the Maraş massacre in 1978.

The heartland and sacred land of Kurdish Alevis is the Dersim region.

== Population ==
In Turkey, different estimations exist on the Kurdish Alevi population. While Dressler and several other academics state that about one third or fifth of the Alevi population is Kurdish, respectively, Hamza Aksüt argue that a majority of the Alevi population is Kurdish.

According to a study published in 2015, in the Eastern Anatolia and Southeastern Anatolia regions of Turkey, 69.7% of Alevis speak Zaza, 20.2% of them speak Kurmanji Kurdish, 9.0% of them speak Turkish and 1.1% of them per cent Arabic as their mother tongue. In contrast to their mother tongue, 70.8% of Alevis mostly speak Turkish within their family, while 18.0% speak Zaza, 9.0% Kurdish, 1.1% Arabic and 1.1% "others". Also, 73% of Alevis have tribal affiliation, which is different from the general profile of the region.

== Geography ==
Tunceli Province is the only Kurdish Alevi-majority province in Turkey. Moreover, there are Kurdish Alevi settlements in the provinces of Adıyaman, Ardahan, Bingöl, Çorum, Elazığ, Erzincan, Erzurum, Gaziantep, Gümüşhane, Kahramanmaraş, Kayseri, Malatya, Muş, Sivas and Yozgat. Outside of Turkey, there are Kurdish Alevis in Afrin, Syria.

== History ==
Ocaks associated with Kurdish Alevism were not included in the 13th century Vilayetname by Haji Bektash Veli. In the 16th century, Kurdish Alevis of Dersim lived under the Emirate of Çemişgezek and the autonomy of this emirate made the community flourish and expand.

After surviving the attempted elimination of Bektashism by Ottoman Emperor Mahmud II in the early 1800s, the Haji Bektash Veli order sought to surpass the Alevi order in influence. Bektashis would center their beliefs around the dargah which emerged as an Ottoman institution, but Kurdish Alevis continued to hold on to their pre-Ottoman beliefs and thus bypass the institutionalism. In the late 19th century, Emperor Abdul Hamid II did not shy away from using the institutionalized Bektashi beliefs to Bektashify the Kurdish Alevis. The Axûçan ocax was the first to be approached and did subject itself to the beliefs of Haji Bektash Veli by introducing the Bektashi beliefs to their religious ceremonies (see Jem). During World War I, Bektashi missionary Mehmet Cemaleddin Efendi stated that the Kurdish Alevis had 'fallen away from the path' and tried to influence their beliefs through the Axûçan ocax on behalf of the Committee of Union and Progress. This period also saw Sunnification of Kurdish Alevis and tribes such as the Reşwan and Şavak have both Alevi and Sunni members today.

In 1921, the Koçgiri rebellion took place with the goal of receiving political autonomy for Kurds and withdrawal of Turkish forces in Kurdistan. The rebellion was put down, but Kurdish Alevis rebelled again in the Dersim rebellion in the 1937, due to the centralist policies of the newly established Turkish republic. This rebellion was also suppressed. Thousands of Alevi Kurds were massacred and the town of Dersim was almost fully destroyed. In the subsequent period from the Dersim rebellion till the 1960s, the Kurds 'went into deep silence'.

In the 1950 and 1954 general elections, a majority of Alevi Kurds voted for the Democrat Party, while the Alevi Kurdish vote would split between the Republican People's Party (CHP), New Turkey Party, Justice Party and Workers' Party of Turkey in the subsequent elections through the 1960s. The Workers' Party of Turkey (TIP) would target the Alevi vote and openly mentioned the rights of Alevis in their 1964 program which culminated with them winning a seat in Malatya Province in the 1965 elections. While the national support for TIP decreased in the 1969 elections, they increased their share of vote among Alevi Kurds. However, due to both the strong association between right-wing parties and Sunni Muslims and the incapability of CHP to challenge the conservative parties, Alevis formed the minority rights-led leftist Unity Party in 1966. Yet, because of its focus on Kemalism and Turkish nationalism, the party did not receive much support from Alevi Kurds. In the 1970s, the politicization of Islam pushed Alevi Kurds towards CHP, however the party was closed down after the 1980 Turkish coup d'état. Alevi Kurds afterwards gave their support to the Social Democratic Populist Party, until CHP was reestablished in 1992. Alevi Kurds not only took part in the formation of the Kurdistan Workers' Party (PKK) but many of them also became leading figures, including Mazlum Doğan, Sakine Cansız, Ali Haydar Kaytan, Mustafa Karasu, Rıza Altun and Bese Hozat. PKK sought to present itself as defenders of Alevi Kurds and targeted the Turkish nationalists who took part in the Çorum massacre. Alevi Kurdish support for PKK would increase throughout the 1980s due to the devastating impact on the Turkish left as a result of the 1980 Turkish coup d'état. In the 2010s, the Peoples' Democratic Party received support from a large majority of Alevi Kurds, becoming their main political representative. Another significant event was the election of Alevi Kurdish Gültan Kışanak as co-mayor of the largest Kurdish municipality Diyarbakır in 2014.

== Structure ==
Traditionally, the socio-religious structure of Kurdish Alevis consists of two hereditary social positions; members of the sacred lineage or ocax and those subordinated to the sacred lineage or taliw. By the end of the 20th century, this system had been gravely impacted by cultural destruction and the taliw has gained influence in regard to religion and identity politics. Since the anti-Alevi violence in the 1990s, Taliws have strengthened the cultural identity of Kurdish Alevis.

=== Ocax ===
Ocax refers to various sacred lineages in Kurdish Alevism. The ocaxes are: Axûçan, Babamansûr, Sînemîllî, Celal Abbas, Kurêsû, Cemal Avdel, Dewrêş Gewr, Dewrêş Cemal, Seyit Sabun, Sari Saltik, Ûryan Xizir, Şeyh Çoban and Şix Delîlê Berxêcan. Since sacred lineage and religious rank is determined by tribal affiliation, it is fairly easy to identify which individual has which religious position in which ocax.

=== Taliw and sayyid ===
Taliw is a term used to encompass every Kurdish Alevi person who receives religious services. In Kurdish Alevism, most people only receive services, while a small segment both receive and give. This latter small segment is called sayyid. For the taliw population to receive a religious service, the sayyid must travel to their place of residence. Traditionally, the sayyid therefore had to travel from village to village to offer their service.

==== Raywer ====
Raywer or rêber is a term used to describe the sayyid who prepares and serves the religious functions and therefore leads the others down the right path. The raywer also has the role of explaining the religion to its members. The raywer is chosen from a sayyid ocax at birth and the title is lifelong. Nonetheless, the person can always choose not to practice his raywership.

==== Pîr ====
It is believed that some members of the sayyid have spiritual power through bloodline. While the raywer guides the members of Alevism practically, the pîr thus guides spiritually.

==== Murşîd ====
Murşîd is the highest rank in the ocax systems. The murşîd presides over the jurisprudent element of the system and has the role of appeal. For example, if a taliw feels injustice regarding the decision of a pîr, they can appeal to the murşîd.

== Jiare ==
Jiare are the sacred places which Alevi Kurds worship. This includes trees, mountains, rocks, caves, rivers, lakes, fountains, the sun and the moon that are each related to a semi-deific figure. These places and objects are thus sacred and some objects are moreover considered dangerous and therefore kept by the rawyer, pîr or murşîd. Jiare can be utilized to treat people who suffer from paralysis or mental issues. Two important jiare are Munzur River and the sacred mountain associated with (or embodying) Duzgin Bawo, both located in Tunceli Province.

=== Munzur River ===
Munzur River is located near Ovacık and a place of pilgrimage and ritual slaughter and people pray to God through the various jiare in the region. Munzur Bawa was the name of a shepherd who was believed to be able to practice miracles.

== Xizir ==
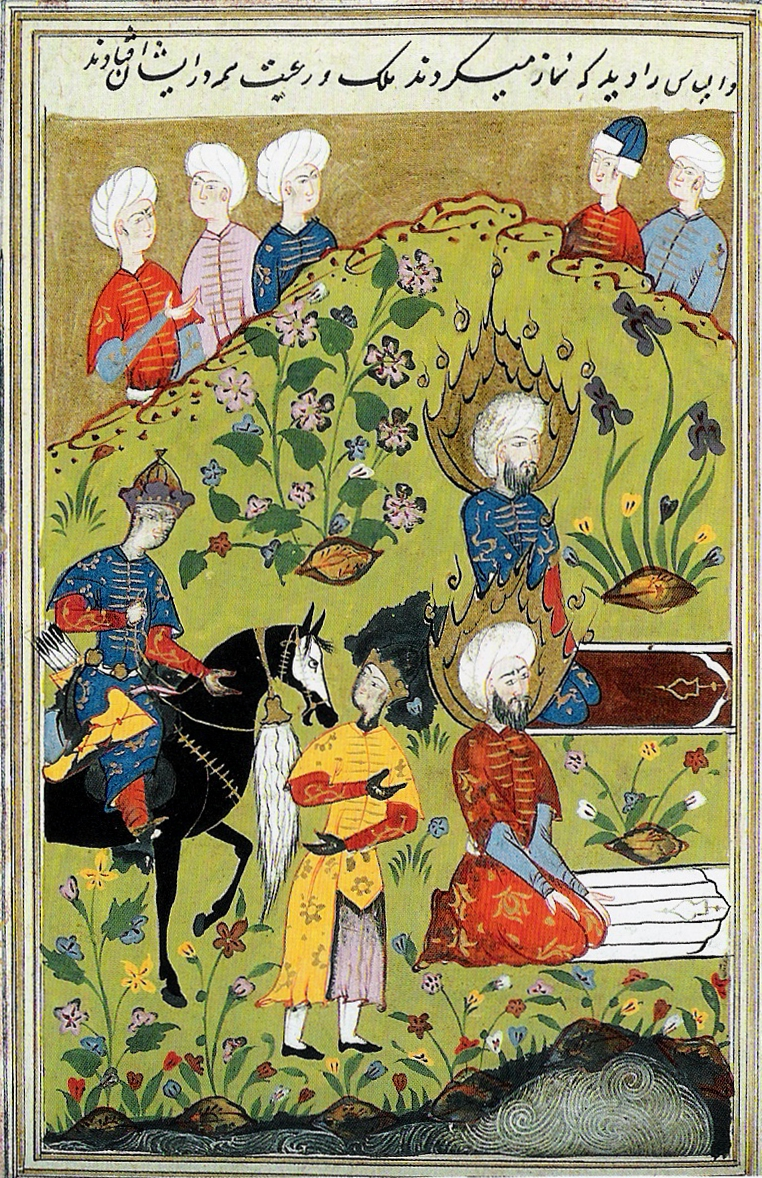
A Persian manuscript depicting Elijah and Khidr praying together from an illuminated manuscript version of Stories of the Prophets

Xizir (ie. Khidr) is an important religious figure who is considered to have spiritual power and an emanation of God and a batin of Ali. It is believed that Xizir travels between earth and heaven and during travels has generated numerous jiare - including oases and springs from where his feet touched the ground.

Xizir Fountain is one of these jiare located in Varto and is also visited by Sunni Kurds.

Another jiare related to Xizir is Gola Çeto in Pülümür which is the location where it is believed Xizir meets Elijah once a year from 13 February and the subsequent three days. During this period, Kurdish Alevis fast and it is believed that the meeting ends winter.

== See also ==
- Dersim massacre
- Anti-Alevism
- Religion in Turkey

== Bibliography ==
- Aksüt, Hamza (2012), Aleviler: Türkiye, İran, İrak, Suriye, Bulgaristan: Araştırma-İnceleme (in Turkish) (5 ed.), Ankara, ISBN 978-975-9025-61-8
- Aydin, Suavi (2020), "A Survey of the Roots and History of Kurdish Alevism: What are the Divergences and Convergences between Kurdish Alevi Groups in Turkey?", Kurdish Studies, 8 (1), CEEOL: 17–42, doi:10.33182/ks.v8i1.551, S2CID 219734521
- Deniz, Dilşa (2019), Kurdish Alevi Belief System, Rêya Heqî/Raa Haqi: Structure, Networking, Ritual, and Function, Lexington Books
- Dressler, Markus (2008). "Alevīs". In Fleet, Kate; Krämer, Gudrun; Matringe, Denis; Nawas, John; Rowson, Everett (eds.). Encyclopaedia of Islam (3rd ed.). Brill Online. ISSN 1873-9830.
- Gezik, Erdal (2021), "The Kurdish Alevis: The Followers of the Path of Truth", in Bozarslan, Hamit (ed.), The Cambridge History of the Kurds, Cambridge University Press, doi:10.1017/9781108623711.026
- Gültekin, Ahmet Kerim (2019), Kurdish Alevism: Creating New Ways of Practicing the Religion (PDF), University of Leipzig
- Günes, Cengiz (2020), Political Representation of Alevi Kurds in Turkey: Historical Trends and Main Transformations
- van Bruinessen, Martin (2015), "Dersim and Dalahu: Some Reflections on Kurdish Alevism and the Ahl-i Haqq religion", Islamic Alternatives: Non-Mainstream Religion in Persianate Societies, ISBN 9783447107792
- Wakamatsu, Hiroki (2013), "Veneration of the Sacred or Regeneration of the Religious: An Analysis of Saints and the Popular Beliefs of Kurdish Alevis", 上智アジア学, vol. 31, Sophia University
- Sinclair-Webb, Emma (2003). White, Paul Joseph; Jongerden, Joost (eds.). Turkey's Alevi Enigma: A Comprehensive Overview. Brill Publishers. ISBN 9789004125384.
- Çiftçi, Deniz (2019). The Kurds and the Politics of Turkey: Agency, Territory and Religion. Bloomsbury Publishing. ISBN 9781788316385.
- Sweetnam, Denise L. (1994). Kurdish Culture: A Cross-cultural Guide. Verlag für Kultur und Wissenschaft. ISBN 3926105194.
- Dalkılıç, Halil (2015). Asimilasyon Kıskacında Alevi Kürtler (in Turkish). Siyam Kitap. ISBN 9786058448018.
- Yeğen, Mesut (2015). "Kürt Seçmenlerin Oy Verme Dinamikleri: Kuzeydoğu-Ortadoğu ve Güneydoğu Anadolu Alt Bölgelerinde Seçmenin Siyasal Tercihlerinin Sosyolojik Analizi" (PDF) (in Turkish). Archived from the original (PDF) on 2021-06-24.
