= Atma (tribe) =

Kurdish tribe

Regions with significant populations
- Turkey: Kahramanmaraş, Malatya

Languages
- Kurdish

Religion
- Majority Kurdish Alevism, minority Sunni Islam

Atma (Local Kurdish: Otmî; Kurdish: Atmî) is a Kurdish tribe mainly inhabiting parts of Kahramanmaraş and Malatya provinces in Turkey.

== History ==
Atma tribesmen believe that they descend from the Kalhor tribe in modern-day Iraq but later migrated to Nusaybin then to Malatya, and a portion of the tribe further settled near Pazarcık. In 16th-century Ottoman records, Atma tribe consisted of 7 people near Malatya. Atma villages in Arguvan were formed after early 18th century. In mid-18th century, Atma inhabited the region to the north of Aintab with 1000 tents, corresponding to modern-day Pazarcık.

== Sub-tribes ==
Atma is made up of 12 sub-tribes:

- Rîvon (lit. the foxes; Turkish: Tilkiler)
- Kizîron (lit. the shorts; Turkish: Kizirler)
- Haydarlı
- Ketiler
- Sadakalar
- Kızkapanlı (lit. with girl-catchers)
- Karahasanlar
- Karalar (lit. blacks)
- Oxcon (Turkish: Ağcalar, lit. whites)
- Turûşon (Turkish: Turuçlu)
- Kabalar (lit. the rudes)
- Mahkânlı

== See also ==
- Maraş massacre
