= Kahramanmaraş Province =

Province of Turkey

- Province and metropolitan municipality
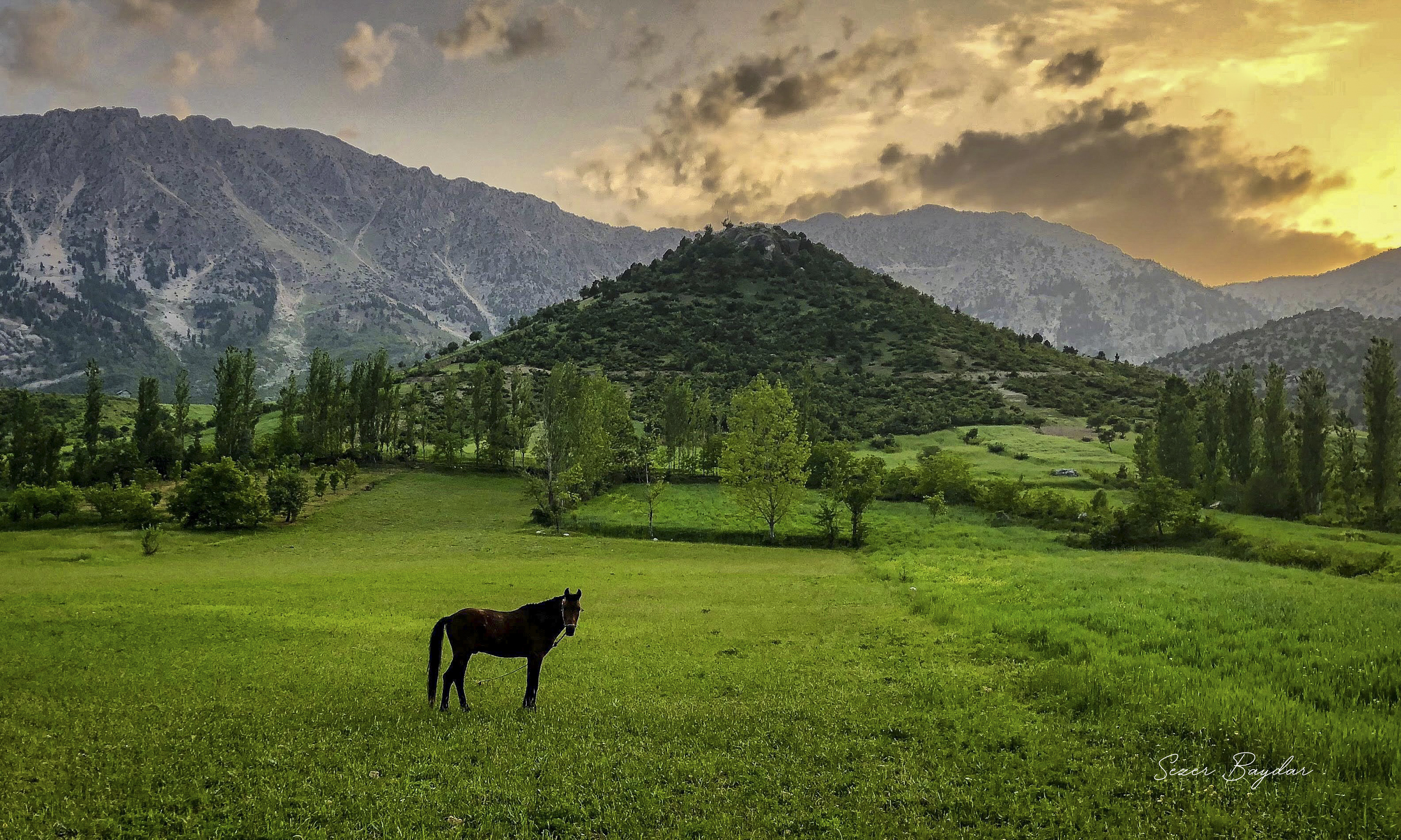
- Yeşilgöz, Kahramanmaraş

- Location of the province within Turkey
- Coordinates: 37°53′54″N 36°58′16″E
- Country: Turkey
- Seat: Kahramanmaraş

Government
  - Mayor: Fırat Görgel (AK Party)
  - Vali: Mükerrem Ünlüer
- Area: 14,520 km^{2} (5,610 sq mi)
- Population (2022): 1,177,436
  - Density: 81.09/km^{2} (210.0/sq mi)
- Time zone: UTC+3 (TRT)
- Area code: 0344
- ISO 3166 code: TR-46
- Website: www.kahramanmaras.bel.tr www.kahramanmaras.gov.tr

Kahramanmaraş Province (Turkish: Kahramanmaraş ili) is a province and metropolitan municipality of Turkey. Its area is 14,520 km^{2}, and its population is 1,177,436 (2022). Its provincial capital is the city of Kahramanmaraş, and the traffic code is 46. Its Pazarcık and Elbistan districts were impacted by the 2023 Turkey–Syria earthquakes, causing major damage to the city with more than 50,000 deaths.

== History ==
More than 12,600 residents of Kahramanmaraş province were killed during the 6 February 2023 earthquakes. Both earthquakes had epicenters in the province. Many large towns and cities including Elbistan had buildings collapse.

== Geography ==
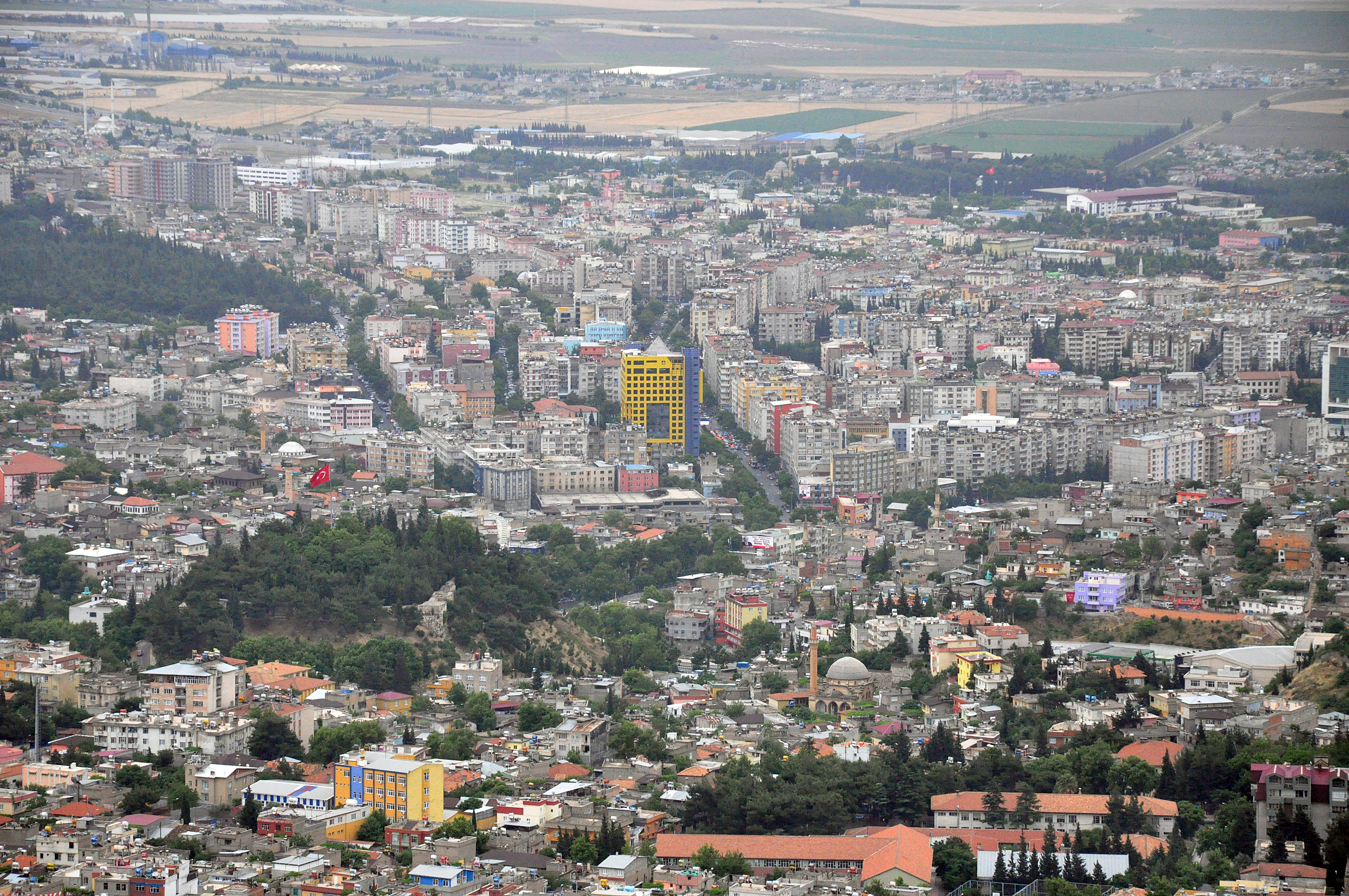
Kahramanmaraş City

Köppen map of Kahramanmaraş Province and surrounding regions:
- BSk
- Csa
- Dsa
- Dsb
- Dsc

Making up 1.83 % of Turkey's land area, Kahramanmaraş is traversed by the northeasterly line of equal latitude and longitude. The majority of the province with around 60% of the total area is covered with mountains, being followed by plateaus and plains. Most of the mountains in the province is part of the Southeastern Taurus Mountain range. Due to the low tree line most of the highest areas are bare, but lower regions have forests.

Southern parts of the province has a hot-summer type Mediterranean climate (Csa), including the administrative center of Kahramanmaraş. Northern parts of the province show the characteristics of a continental climate (Dsa and Dsb). At the northernmost parts of the province lays the Elbistan Plain, where the town and district of Elbistan is located. It has a cold semi arid climate.

Ceyhan River is the most important river in the province. Lake Kumaşır, along with some small crater lakes on the Nurhak and Ahir mountains makes the only natural body of water in the province, though there are multiple dam reservoirs such as Dam Lake Menzelet.

=== Districts ===
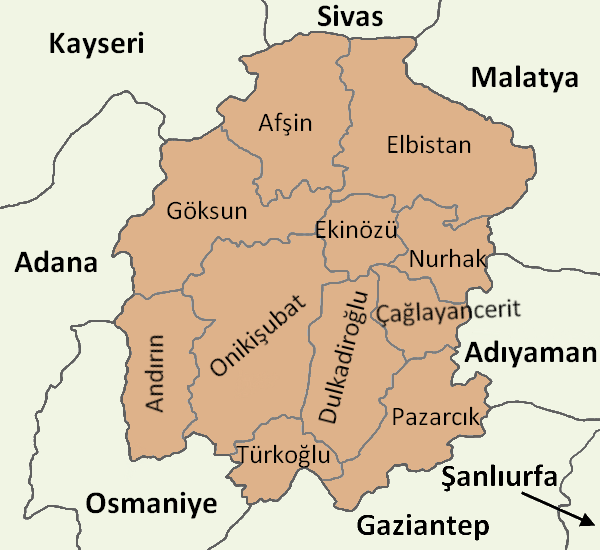
Districts of the Kahramanmaraş Province

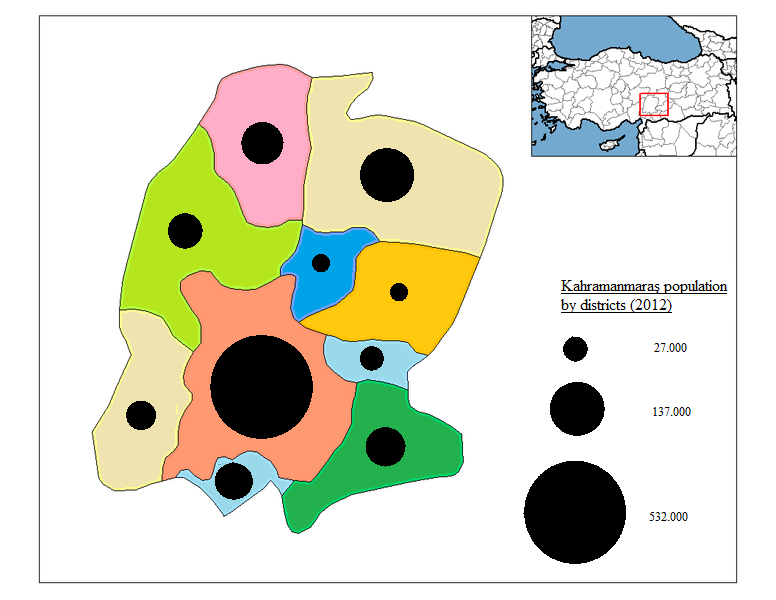
The population of the province in 2012.

Kahramanmaraş province is divided into 11 districts (İlçe):

- Afşin
- Andırın
- Çağlayancerit
- Dulkadiroğlu
- Ekinözü
- Elbistan
- Göksun
- Nurhak
- Onikişubat
- Pazarcık
- Türkoğlu

== Health ==
Air pollution in Turkey is a persistent issue and has been linked to the usage of coal-fired power plants, such as the Afşin-Elbistan power stations.

== Economy ==
Kahramanmaraş has historically been famous for its gold. The textile industry in Kahramanmaraş has only recently developed and mainly operates through the use of machinery.

== Education ==
The Kahramanmaraş Sütçü İmam University is a recently founded university supplying social, language and technical sciences as well as medical education.

== Cuisine ==
The province's most famous culinary specialty is Dondurma, also called "Maraş ice cream", available in specialist Ice Cream shops throughout Turkey. The ice cream has an elastic consistency and is served with knife and fork, often accompanied by a slice of baklava. It melts in the mouth while chewed, with a consistency similar to bubble gum.

Maraş red peppers (Turkish: kırmızı biber) are also well known for its aroma, vitamin C content, and moderate hotness. Maraş pepper is different from far-east chilies as dried with support of Scientific Investigations and Universities which contains no aflatoxin and no diseases.

== See also ==
- Düzbağ
