= Bahanur Şahin Gökalp =

Turkish volleyball player (born 1991)

Personal information
- Born: Bahanur Şahin; 6 March 1991 (age 35); Tokat, Turkey
- Height: 1.78 m (5 ft 10 in)
- Weight: 62 kg (137 lb)
- Spike: 275 cm (9 ft 1/2 in)
- Block: 268 cm (8 ft 9 1/2 in)

Volleyball information
- Position: Libero

Career
Years
- 2002–2004
- 2004–2006
- 2007–2009
- 2009–2010
- 2010–2011
- 2011–2012
- 2012–2013
- 2012–2013
- 2013–2014
- 2014–2015
- 2015–2016
- 2016–2017
- 2016–2017
Teams
- Antalya
- Yeşilyurt
- VakıfBank Güneş Sigorta
- →Galatasaray
- VakıfBank Güneş Sigorta
- TED Ankara Kolejliler
- İller Bankası
- DYO Karsiyaka Izmir
- Ereğli Bld.
- HalkBank
- Balıkesir BB
- İdmanocağı
- Bolu Bld.

National team
- 2018–2022
- 2019–2022
- Turkey beach
- Turkey snow
Honours
Representing Turkey
Women's Beach volleyball
BVA Balkan Championships
Gold medal – first place	2022 Burhaniye	Team
BVA Balkan Tour
Gold medal – first place	2022 İzmir	Team
Gold medal – first place	2019 İzmir	Team
Bronze medal – third place	2018 Bursa	Team
BVA Balkan Zonal Tour
Gold medal – first place	2022 Balıkesir	Team
Women's Snow volleyball
CEV European Tour
Gold medal – first place	2022 Kayseri	Team

Bahanur Şahin Gökalp (born Bahanur Şahin; 6 March 1991) is a Turkish retired volleyball player who played as libero. She also played beach and snow volleyball as part of the Turkey national teams respectively.

== Indoor volleyball ==
Şahin started her volleyball career at the age of eleven playing at Antalya GSK. Between 2004 and 2006, she was with Yeşilyurt in Istanbul. In 2007, she moved to VakıfBank Güneş Sigorta, where she came up through the youth system.

In the 2009–10 season, she was loaned out to Galatasaray. The next season, she returned to VakıfBank Güneş Sigorta Türk Telekom. She won the 2010–11 CEV Women's Champions League with her team. For the 2011–12 season, she transferred to TED Ankara Kolejliler, and subsequently she played at İller Bankası, DYO Karsiyaka Izmir and Ereğli Bld. After playing one season for Ereğli Bld. of Ereğli, Konya in the Second League, she transferred to HalkBank in the 2014–15 First League. In the next season, she was with Balıkesir BB. She joined İdmanocağı of Trabzon in June 2016. In January 2017, she transferred to the First League club Bolu Bld. after her contract with İdmanocağı was terminated by mutual agreement before the expiration of the term.

She is 1.78 m (5 ft 10 in) tall at 62 kg (137 lb), has a spike height of 275 cm (9 ft 1/2 in) and a block height of 26 cm (10 in), and plays as libero.

== Beach volleyball ==
Şahin also played beach volleyball. She competed at the 2009 FIVB Beach Volleyball Women's U19 World Championships in Alanya and 2014 European Beach Volleyball Women's Tour Antalya. She won the bronze medal at the 2018 BVA Balkan Beach Volleyball Women's Tour Bursa with teammate Aleyna Vence, the gold medal at the 2019 BVA Balkan Beach Volleyball Women's Tour İzmir with Merve Çelebi, gold medals with Çelebi at Turkish Beach Volleyball Tours Lefkoşa, Manavgat, Hopa, Altınoluk as well as the silver medal at the 2019 Bioderma Pro Beach Women's Tour Sinop with Merve Nezir. In 2019, she competed at the Beach Volleyball Women's Pro Tour in Aydın and Baden. She took silver medals at the 2021 Turkish Tour Kalamış with Çelebi, 2021 Bioderma Pro Beach Tour Dikili with Çelebi, and gold medals with Çelebi at the 2022 Turkish Tours Hopa, Lefkoşa, Erdek, 2022 BVA Balkan Zonal Tour Balıkesir, 2022 BVA Balkan Tour İzmir. She played at the 2022 World Pro Beach Tour Future Balıkesir, Kuşadası and 022 Balkan Zonal Tour Balıkesir. She was part of the national team with her teammate Merve Çelebi, which won the gold medal at the 2022 Balkan Beach Volleyball Championships in Burhaniye, Balıkesir, Turkey.

== Snow volleyball ==
She also played snow volleyball as part of the Turkey national team. She competed at the 2019 CEV European Snow Volleyball Women's Tour Moscow with teammates Aleyna Vence and Merve Çelebi, and lost the bronze medal match against the Lithuanian team. She captured the gold medal with her teammates Simge Yalçın, Merve Çelebi, and Sanem Baş at the 2022 CEV Snow Volleyball European Tour Kayseri at the Erciyes Ski Resort.

== Personal life ==
Şahin was born to Salih Bahtiyar Şahin in Tokat, Turkey on 6 March 1991. Her brother Nuri Şahin was a national volleyball player and coach. She married the basketball player Barış Gökalp in Ankara on 24 July 2017.
