= Merve Çelebi =

Turkish-Cypriot volleyball player (born 1993)

Personal information
- Nationality: Northern Cyprus Turkey
- Born: 15 July 1993 (age 33); Northern Cyprus
- Height: 1.80 m (5 ft 11 in)
- Weight: 64 kg (141 lb)

Career
Years	Teams
2022–2023	Küçük Kaymaklı
Honours
Representing Turkey

Merve Çelebi (born 15 July 1993) is a Turkish-Cypriot female volleyball player. She played also beach and snow volleyball.

== Indoor volleyball ==
Çelebi started her sport career after joining the Vakıflar SK in her hometown in Northern Cyprus, where she came up throughout the youth system.

In the 2022–23 season, she served as a coach at Küçük Kaymaklı, North Cyprus. She established her own volleyball academy

== Beach volleyball ==
Çelebi plays beach volleyball, and represents Turkey at international competitions. In 2019, Çelebi captured gold öedals with Bahanur Şahin Gökalp at the BVA Balkan Tour İzmir, Turkish Tours Lefkoşa and Manavgat as well as with Olga Motrich at the Bioderma Pro Beach Tour Sinop. She won the Turkish Tour Altınoluk with Şahin Gökalp. In 2021, she took silver medals with Şahin Gökaşp at the Turkish Tour Kalamış and Bioderma Pro Beach Tour Dikili. In 2022, with Şahin Gökalp, she won gold medal at the Turkish Tour Hopa, Lefkoşa, Erdek, BVA Balkan Tour İzmir , BVA Balkan Zonal Tour Balıkesir. She came second with Esra Betül Çetin at the Turkish Tour Erciyes, Ölüdeniz,and won gold medals at the Turkish Tour Hopa, TVF Pro Beach Tour Balıkesir Ocaklar, Senior Balkan Beach Championship, and the bronze medal at the CEV Nations Cup Qualification. She won the gold medal at the 2023 Bioderma Pro beach Tour Marmara Ereğlisi. In 2024, she received the gold medal with Sencer at the BVA Balkan Zonal Tour Chișinău. In 2025 at the Bioderma Pro Beach Tour, she and her teammate Yaren Sencer won gold medals in Çatalca, Istanbul, Sinop, Aydın, Balıkesir Ören, İzmir, sşlver medals in Mersin, Kadıköy, Istanbul, Dikili. They ranked third at the 2025 CEV Beach Volleyball Nations Cup Qualification in Espinho, Portugal. At the 2026 Bioderma Pro Beach tour, she won with her partner Yaren Sencer silver in Trabzon, and bronze medals inSinop, Alanya and Aydın.

== Snow volleyball ==
Çelebi plays also snow volleyball representing Turkey. She competed at the 2019 CEV European Snow Volleyball Women's Tour Moscow with teammates Aleyna Vence and Bahanur Şahin Gökalp, and lost the bronze medal match against the Lithuanian team. She and her partners Bahanur Şahin Gökalo and Simge Yalçın took the bronze medal at the 2021 CEV European Snow Volleyball Tour Wagrain, Austria. She won the gold medal at the 2026 FIVB Snow Volleyball World Tour at Uludağ, Bırsa, Turkey with teammates Yaren Sencer, Simge Yalçın and Zehra Ilgın.

== Personal life ==
Çeşebi was born in Northern Cyprus on 15 July 1993.

She studied Health sciences at the Eastern Mediterranean University in Gazimağusa, and attended European University of Lefke in Northern Cyprus.

== Honours ==
- "Evkaf Genç Destek Ödülü" (""Youth Support Award of Evkaf) by the( Kıbrıs Vakıflar İdaresi (Cyprus Foundations Administration), owner of Vakıflar SK.
