= Yedikuyular Ski Resort =

Turkish ski resort

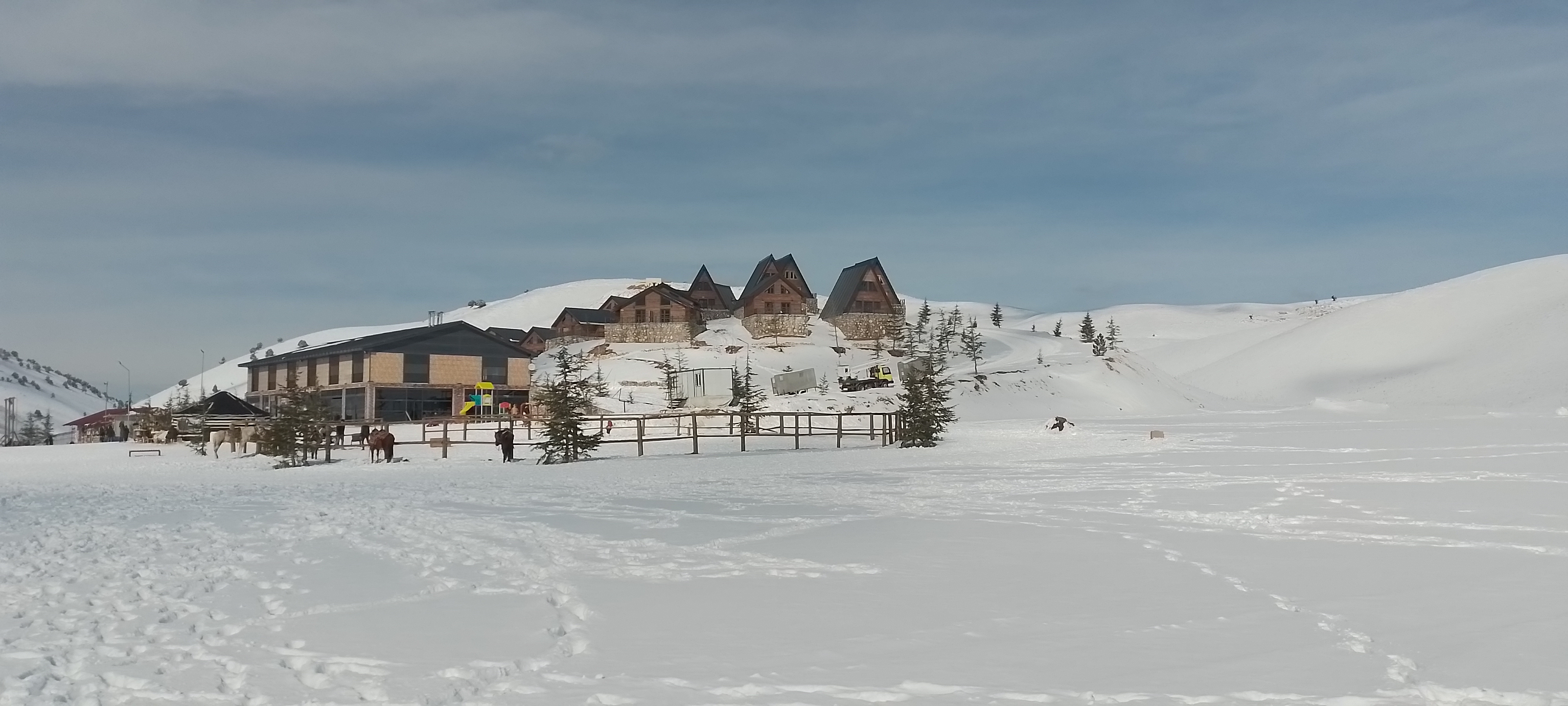

- Location within Turkey
- Location: Mount Ahır, Ulutaş, Dulkadiroğlu, Kahramanmaraş
- Nearest city: Kahramanmaraş
- Coordinates: 37.64806°N 37.04168°E
- Top elevation: 2,300 m (7,500 ft)
- Base elevation: 1,833 m (6,014 ft)
- Longest run: 1,170 m (3,840 ft)
- Total length: 2,430 m (7,970 ft)
- Lift system: 2 baby lifts, 1 chairlift, 1 gondola lift
- Website: www.yedikuyularkayakmerkezi.org

Yedikuyular Ski Resort (Turkish: Yedikuyular Kayak Merkezi) is a ski resort in Turkey near the city of Kahramanmaraş. It is situated at 2,300 m (7,500 ft) elevation.

== Overview ==
Yedikuyular Ski Resort is located on Mount Ahır at Ulutaş neighborhood in Dulkadiroğlu district of Kahramanmaraş Province in southern Turkey. Situated 20 km (12 mi) northeast of the city, it stretches over an area of 100 ha (250 acres).

The ski resort was established by the Kahramanmaraş Metropolitan Municipality in 2018. It was later sold to a private sector company, which runs it.

The site takes its name from "Yedikuyular" (literally: "Seven wells"), where some wells are still existing today.

== Facilities ==
The ski resort includes a visitor center of 520 m^{2} (5,600 sq ft), a ski equipment rental shop of 400 m^{2} (4,300 sq ft) , a first aid facility of 350 m^{2} (3,800 sq ft), commercial units covering 380 m^{2} (4,100 sq ft), restaurant and coffeehouse of 520 m^{2} (5,600 sq ft), social facilities of 1,000 m^{2} (11,000 sq ft), ski lodges of 100 m^{2} (1,100 sq ft).

There three marked pistes:

- a green piste of 1,170 m (3,840 ft) at 15% grade,
- a blue piste of 790 m (2,590 ft) at 18% grade, and
- a red piste of 470 m (1,540 ft) at 38%.

The skiing areas are served by two baby lifts of length 150 m (490 ft) and 200 m (660 ft),

Further facilities are ski junping ramps, picnic and recreation areas, a pond, basketball and volleyball courts, off-road and trekking areas, a heliport, a 1,000 car capacity parking lot. A 760 m (2,490 ft)-long chairlift line and a 430 m (1,410 ft)-long gondola lift serve the skiing area from the base station at 1,833 m (6,014 ft) to the top station at 2,044 m (6,706 ft).

The ski resort is visited on weekends by 15,000-20,000 tourist.

== International winter sports events hosted ==
The ski resort hosted one event of the CEV Snow Volleyball European Tour in 2022.
