= CEV Snow Volleyball European Tour =

the CEV Snow Volleyball European Tour is a unisex sport competition for European national teams in the sport of snow volleyball. The competition is held annually by the CEV (the European volleyball federation). It was first organized in 2016.

== Events ==
Edition	#	Date	Host	Ref
2016	1	12-13 March 2016	(Czech Republic) Špindlerův Mlýn	
2016	2	19-20 March 2016	(Austria) Wagrain	
2016	3	2-3 April 2016	(Italy) Kronplatz	
2017	1	18-19 February 2017	(Turkey) Kayseri, Erciyes Ski Resort	
2017	2	25-26 February 2017	(Czech Republic) Špindlerův Mlýn	
2017	3	3-5 March 2017	(Turkey) Bursa, Uludağ	
2017	4	11-12 March 2017	(Switzerland) Disentis	
2017	5	18-19 March 2017	(Slovenia) Kranjska Gora	
2017	6	1-2 April 2017	(Liechtenstein) Malbun	
2017	7	8-9 April 2017	(Italy) Kronplatz	
2018	1	12-14 January 2018	(Turkey) Kayseri, Erciyes Ski Resort	
2018	2	16-18 February 2018	(Italy) Kronplatz	
2018	3	24-25 February 2018	(Georgia (country)) Bakuriani	
2018	4	1-4 March 2018	(Turkey) Bursa, Uludağ	
2018	5	9-11 March 2018	(Slovenia) Kranjska Gora	
2018	6	16-18 March 2018	(Italy) Kronplatz	
2018	7	23-25 March 2018	(Austria) Wagrain	
2019	1	20-22 December 2018	(Russia) Moscow	
2019	2	11-13 January 2019	(Turkey) Kayseri, MErciyes Ski Resort	
2019	3	15-17 February 2019	(Georgia (country)) Bakuriani	
2019	4	28-31 March 2019	(Austria) Wagrain	
2019	5	29-31 March 2019	(Italy) Prato Nevoso	
2019	6	4-7 April 2019	(Italy) Kronplatz	
2019	7	13-14 April 2019	(Austria) St. Anton	
2020	1	3-5 February 2020	(Armenia) Tsaghkadzor	
2020	2	7-9 February 2020	(Georgia (country)) Bakuriani	
2020	3	21-23 February 2020	(Slovakia) Donovaly	
2020	4	6-8 March 2020	(Italy) Tarvisio	
2021	1	19-21 February 2021	(Austria) Wagrain	
2021	2	26-28 February 2021	(Austria) Wagrain	
2022	1	18-20 February 2022	(Turkey) Kahramanmaraş, Yedikuyular Ski Resort	
2022	2	25-27 February 2022	(Ukraine) Truskavets	
2022	3	4-6 March 2022	(Italy) Tarvisio	
2022	4	18-20 March 2022	(Turkey) Kayseri, Erciyes Ski Resort	
2022	5	25-27 March 2022	(Austria) Wagrain	

== See also ==
- FIVB Snow Volleyball World Tour
