= Mount Ahır =

Mountain in Turkey

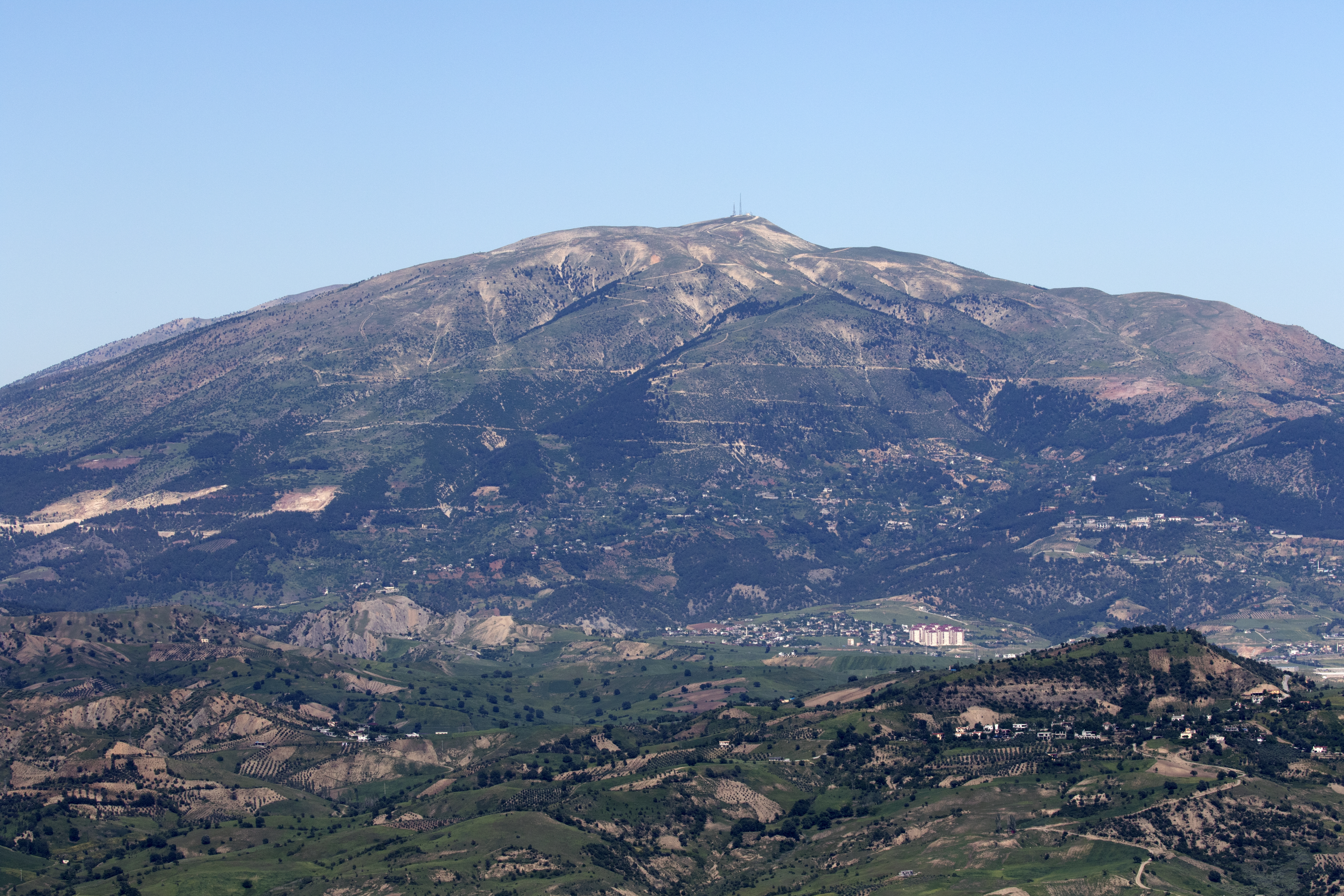
- View of the western side of Mt. Ahir from Kahramanmaraş-Andırın Road

Highest point
- Peak: 2,339 m (7,674 ft)
- Elevation: 450 m (1,480 ft)
- Coordinates: 37.65°N 37.03°E

Dimensions
- Area: 344.85 km^{2} (133.15 mi^{2})

Geography
- Location within Turkey
- Country: Turkey
- Region: Mediterranean

Mount Ahır (Turkish: Ahır Dağı) is a mountain located in Kahramanmaraş Province, southern Turkey, rising up to 2,344 m (7,690 ft).

== Geography ==
Mount Ahir is a flat-shaped mountain mass extending in the east-west direction on the Southeastern Taurus Mountains. It surrounds Kahramanmaraş in the north and northwest directions. It is bordered in the west by Ceyhan River.

== Geology and hydrology ==
It was formed by bending as a result of tectonic movements. It rises up to 2,344 m (7,690 ft) from a plateau of about 450 m (1,480 ft) high. The mountain consists of largely limestone. Rain and melting snow waters penetrating into the porous structure of the limestone emerge as springs at the mountain foot, which are used as drinking water resource for the city of Kahramanmaraş. Shallow lakes are found at the plains in the high parts of the mountain. The "Karagöl" at 1,600 m (5,200 ft) elevation is the largest of them.

== Flora and fauna ==
Although deteriorated by human, the mountain's nature has still a rich vegetation. The richness in plant species diversity as a result of being a transition area of the Mediterranean Region to the Irano-Turanian Region flora and changing altitude and climate values. On mountain slopes, red pine forests grew up to 1,000 m (3,300 ft), cedar forests between 1,200–2,000 m (3,900–6,600 ft), juniper species between 1,000–1,400 m (3,300–4,600 ft), broad-leaved tree communities between 1,000–1,300 m (3,300–4,300 ft) in the northwest. The flora is also composed of degraded oak, high mountain steppes and seasonal vegetation. The red pine forests are situated on the northern side of the mountain. On the southern mountain slopes, there are vineyards and orchards. The mountain contains 36 plant species endemic to the country. Three of them are found only at Mount Ahır.

The mountain area is habitat for 13 butterfly species, including Polyommatus theresiae, a species found in the Mediterranean region.

== See also ==
- Yedikuyular Ski Resort
