= FIVB Snow Volleyball World Tour =

Worldwide professional snow volleyball tour

Snow Volleyball World Tour
- Full name: FIVB Snow Volleyball World Tour
- Region: World
- Date span: April–August
- Tournaments: (Men) (Women)
- Type: Snow volleyball

History
- First tour: 2019
- Number of tours: 1 (2025)

Most World Tour titles

Current World Tour champions

Most tournament titles

The FIVB Snow Volleyball World Tour is the worldwide professional snow volleyball tour for both men and women organized by the Fédération Internationale de Volleyball (FIVB) and the Confédération Européenne de Volleyball (European Volleyball Confederation). The World Tour was introduced in 2019.

== Features ==
=== Prize money ===
This table shows total prize money for each tournament of FIVB Snow Volleyball World Tour. All values are in United States dollar.

Rank	Prize money (per team)	Total
Winner	4,000	4,000
Runner-up	2,400	2,400
Third place	1,600	1,600
Fourth place	800	800
Quarter-finalists	300	1,200

== Tournaments ==
=== 2019 ===
Tournament	Season	Note
Tournament	2019	Note
(Austria) Wagrain–Kleinarl Open	●	Co-sanctioned with CEV European Tour
(Italy) Kronplatz Open	●	Co-sanctioned with CEV European Tour
(Argentina) Bariloche Open	●	

=== 2025 ===
Tournament	Season	Note
Tournament	2025	Note
(Turkey) Erzurum	●	FIVB Snow Volleyball World Tour

== See also ==
- CEV Snow Volleyball European Tour
