= Doğanlıkarahasan =

Village in Kahramanmaraş Province, Turkey

- Neighbourhood
- Location in Turkey
- Coordinates: 37°28′37.1″N 37°10′03.9″E
- Country: Turkey
- Province: Kahramanmaraş
- District: Dulkadiroğlu
- Population (2000): 646
- Time zone: UTC+3 (TRT)

Doğanlıkarahasan (Kurdish: Doxanon) is a neighbourhood in the municipality and district of Dulkadiroğlu, Kahramanmaraş Province, Turkey. It is an Alevi Kurdish settlement. Before the 2013 reorganization, the village was a sub-district of Narlı, Pazarcık.
