= Snow volleyball =

Outdoor, winter team sport

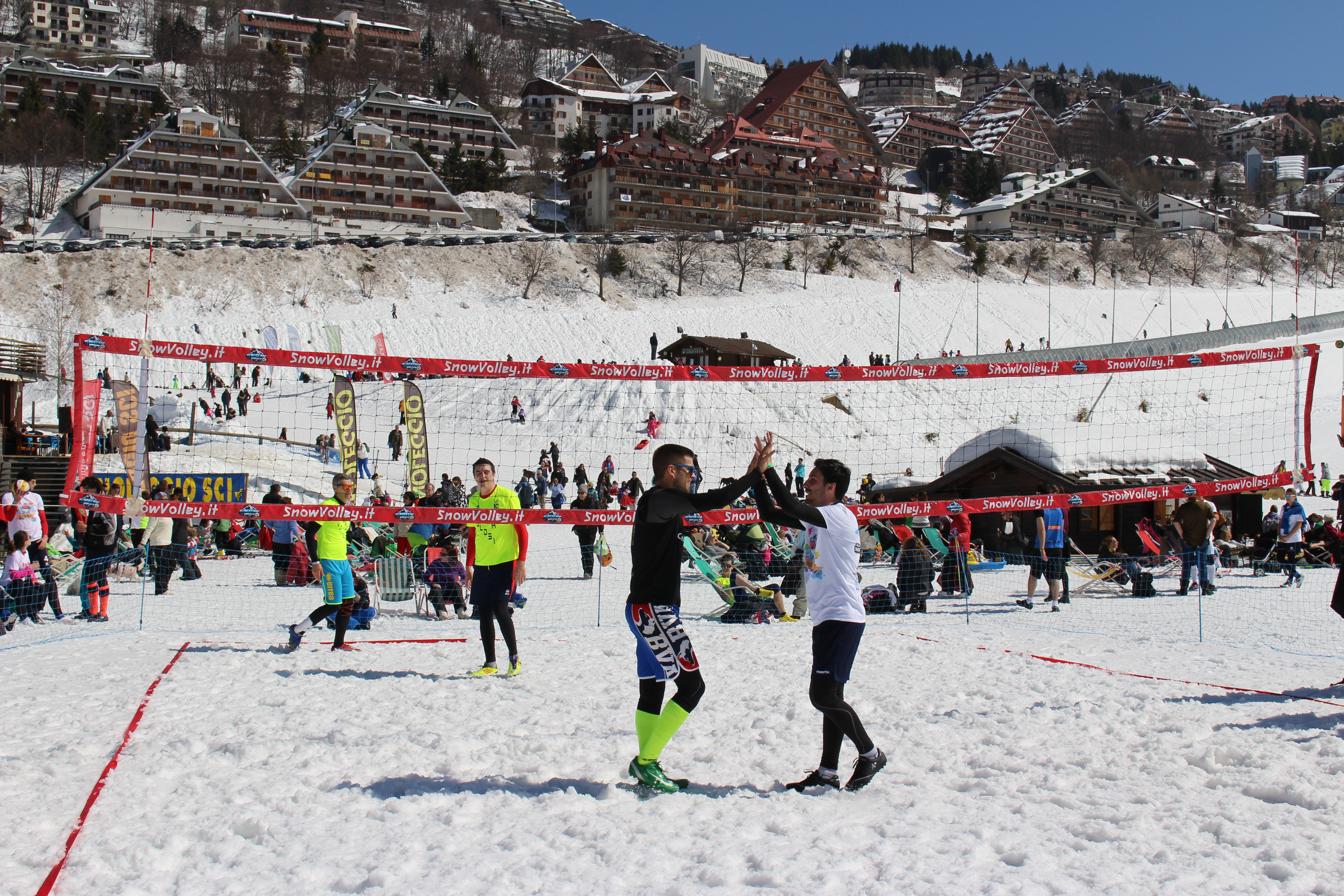
- A snow volleyball event
- Highest governing body: FIVB

Characteristics
- Contact: No
- Team members: 3 per side
- Type: Outdoor, winter team sport
- Equipment: Volleyball

Presence
- Country or region: Europe

Snow volleyball is a winter team sport played by two teams of three players on a snow-covered court divided by a net. Each team aims to score points by sending the ball over the net to ground on the opponent's side. A team is allowed up to three touches to return the ball across the net, and individual players may not touch the ball consecutively.

The sport originated in Austria as a variant of beach volleyball, with a local Snow Volleyball Tour being established in 2009. The sport gained recognition by the European Volleyball Confederation (CEV) in 2015, and the following year saw the inaugural CEV Snow Volleyball European Tour, followed by the inaugural FIVB Snow Volleyball World Tour in 2019. The Fédération Internationale de Volleyball (FIVB) is the international governing body for the sport.

== History ==
Volleyball has been played on snow for decades, especially in countries such as Russia, Austria and Switzerland, even though without any specifically codified rules, but simply as a variation of the volleyball game played on sand. Unofficial Snow Volleyball competitions were held in Austria and Switzerland in the late 90s, before the idea re-emerged in 2008, upon the initiative of Martin Kaswurm, a local promoter. The sport gained popularity in Wagrain, Austria, in 2008, and the first Snow Volleyball Tour was set up the following year. It was recognized as an official sport by the Austrian Volleyball Association in 2011. Initially taking place across Austria, the Tour expanded to include stops in other European countries by 2013. The European Volleyball Confederation (CEV) officially added the sport in October 2015 and organized the first CEV Snow Volleyball European Tour in 2016. The inaugural CEV European Snow Volleyball Championships took place in March 2018 in Austria. A Snow Volleyball European Tour under the umbrella of the CEV has taken place yearly ever since, with events held in countries as diverse as Austria, Czech Republic, Georgia, Italy, Liechtenstein, Russia, Slovenia, Switzerland and Turkey, while national championships qualifying to the inaugural European Championships were organised by 17 National Federations in the winter of 2018. According to Yahoo Sports, the International Volleyball Federation and the European Volleyball Confederation recruited beach volleyball Olympians from countries like Brazil, China, South Korea, and Austria to compete in a demonstration at the Austria House, where the athletes donned warm clothing, gloves, and soccer cleats to bump, set, and spike on a snowy court.

With plans to make snow volleyball part of the future Winter Olympic Games programme, the FIVB and the CEV recruited former beach volleyball Olympians to compete in a demonstration of the sport at the 2018 Winter Olympics. Since then, more efforts have been made to increase global participation in the sport. In the first tournament of the 2018–19 European Tour season, teams from the United States, Brazil and Kazakhstan were invited to compete for the first time. Meanwhile, the inaugural FIVB Snow Volleyball World Tour started in 2019, with two events co-hosted by the FIVB and CEV in Wagrain and Plan de Corones, followed by the first extra-European such event held in Bariloche, Argentina. Teams from countries with little tradition in winter sports such as Brazil and Argentina have been able to claim their first international medals in any snow or ice sports through the introduction of the Snow Volleyball World Tour.

== Rules ==
=== Court and equipment ===
Snow volleyball is played on a rectangular snow court. The court is 16 m (52.5 ft) long and 8 m (26.2 ft) wide, surrounded by a clear space, which is at least 2 m (6 ft 6.7 in) wide on all sides. The snow should be at least 30 cm (11.8 in) deep, and as leveled as possible and free of potential hazards such as rocks that could cause injuries to players. The court is divided into equal halves by a net that is 8.5 m (27.9 ft) long and 1 m (3 ft 3.4 in) wide. The top of the net is 2.43 m (7 ft 11 11/16 in) above the center of the court for men's competition, and 2.24 m (7 ft 4 3/16 in) for women's competition. An antenna, 1.8 m (5 ft 10.9 in) long and 10 mm (0.4 in) in diameter, is attached to each side edge of the net. The antennae are considered part of the net and extend 80 cm (31.5 in) above it, forming the lateral boundaries within which the ball is allowed to cross.

FIVB regulations state that the ball must be spherical and made of flexible and water resistant material, such that it is appropriate for outdoor conditions. A snow volleyball ball has a circumference of 66–68 cm and a weight of 260–280 g.

=== Teams ===
For a long period, Snow Volleyball was played 2 vs 2 as with Beach Volleyball. This changed to 3 vs 3 at the start of the 2018/2019 season in a move to make the game more appealing and make the rallies last longer. A team is composed of three starters and one substitute. Each team is allowed to make up to two substitutions per set. Coaching during matches is not allowed.

=== Scoring ===
A team scores a point when: the ball lands on the opposing team's court; the opposing team hits the ball "out"; the opposing team commits a fault; or the opposing team receives a penalty. The team that won the point serves for the next point. The ball is considered "out" if it: lands on the ground completely outside the boundary lines (a ball is "in" if any part of it touches a sideline or end-line); touches an object or person (who is not a player) outside the court; touches the net's antennae; does not cross the net's lateral boundaries (within the antennae) during service or during a team's third contact; crosses completely under the net.

A set is won by the first team to reach 15 points with a two-point advantage. A match is won by the first team to win two sets.

=== Differences with the beach game ===
Originating as a variant of beach volleyball, the rules of snow volleyball are similar to the beach game. Besides the playing surface, the main differences between snow and beach volleyball are the scoring system and the number of players. As in the beach version, matches were originally best of 3 sets played to 21 points, with two players in a team. In December 2018, the FIVB approved new rules for snow volleyball which changed the scoring system to a best of 3 sets played to 15 points, and the number of players to three starters and one substitute in a team. Another difference is that unlike beach volleyball, a touch off block does not count as one of the three allowed touches, and any player may make the subsequent touch after the block.

=== Attire ===
There is no mandatory outfit that teams must wear. Players often wear thermal clothing and cleats to provide grip on the snow. Waterproof clothing is also very popular. The FIVB allows players to wear beanies, sunglasses, and gloves to provide protection and warmth.

== Gameplay ==
The teams start on the opposite sides of the net. One team is designated the serving team and opposing team is the receiving team. A coin toss is conducted by the referee before the warm-ups to determine which team serves first and which sides of the court the teams start on for the first two sets. If a third deciding set is needed, another coin toss will be conducted prior to the third set. The service order decided at the coin toss before a set is maintained throughout the set.

For each point, a player from the serving team initiates the serve by tossing the ball into the air and attempting to hit the ball so it passes over the net on a course such that it will land in the opposing team's court. The opposing team must use a combination of no more than three contacts with the ball to return the ball to the opponent's side of the net, and individual players may not touch the ball twice consecutively. The three contacts usually consist first of the bump or pass, second of the set so that the ball's trajectory is aimed towards a spot where it can be hit, and third of the spike (jumping, raising one arm above the head and hitting the ball so it will move quickly down to the ground on the opponent's court) or shot to return the ball over the net. The team with possession of the ball that is trying to attack the ball as described is said to be on offense.

The team on defense attempts to prevent the attacking team from directing the ball into their court: the player(s) at the net jumps and reaches above the top (and if possible, across the plane) of the net to block the attacked ball. If the ball is hit around, above, or through the block, the defensive player(s) positioned behind the blocker(s) attempts to control the ball with a dig (usually a forearm pass). After a successful dig, the team transitions to offense.

The game continues in this manner, rallying back and forth, until the ball touches the court within the boundaries or until a fault is committed.

Teams switch ends of the court after every 5 points played. Each team may request one 30-second time-out per set.

== See also ==
- FIVB Snow Volleyball World Tour
- CEV Snow Volleyball European Tour
- Volleyball variations
