= Dulkadiroğlu =

- District and municipality
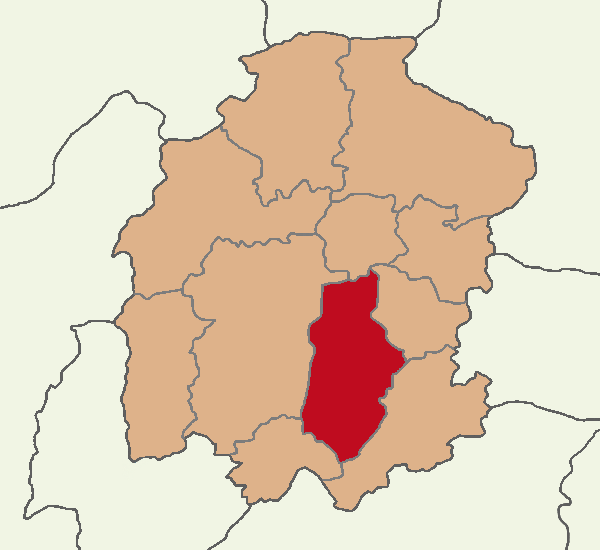
- Map showing Dulkadiroğlu District in Kahramanmaraş Province

- Location in Turkey
- Coordinates: 37°35′N 36°56′E
- Country: Turkey
- Province: Kahramanmaraş

Government
  - Mayor: Mehmet Akpinar (YRP)
- Area: 1,176 km^{2} (454 sq mi)
- Population (2022): 226,409
  - Density: 190/km^{2} (500/sq mi)
- Time zone: UTC+3 (TRT)
- Area code: 0344
- Website: www.dulkadiroglu.bel.tr

Dulkadiroğlu is a municipality and district of Kahramanmaraş Province, Turkey. Its area is 1,176 km^{2}, and its population is 226,409 (2022). The district Dulkadiroğlu was created at the 2013 reorganisation from parts of the former central district of Kahramanmaraş and the district of Pazarcık, along with the new district Onikişubat. It covers the eastern part of the agglomeration of Kahramanmaraş and the adjacent countryside. The name Kahramanmaraş is reserved for the metropolitan municipality.

"Dulkadiroğlu" means "son of Dulkadir"; Dulkadir was a Turkmen tribe leader who had founded a beylik (principality) in and around Kahramanmaraş in the 15th century.

== Composition ==
There are 105 neighbourhoods in Dulkadiroğlu District:

- Abbaslar
- Ağabeyli
- Aksu
- Akyar
- Alibeyuşağı
- Arslanbey Çiftliği
- Aslanbey
- Ayaklıcaoluk
- Bağlarbaşı
- Bahçeli
- Bahçelievler
- Ballıca
- Başdervişli
- Bayazıtlı
- Baydemirli
- Beşenli
- Boyalı
- Budaklı
- Bulanık
- Çatmayayla
- Çiğli
- Çınarlı
- Çobanlı
- Çokyaşar
- Delilköy
- Demirciler
- Denizli
- Dereköy
- Dereli
- Divanlı
- Doğanlıkarahasan
- Doğukent
- Dulkadiroğlu
- Duraklı
- Egemenlik
- Ekberoğlu
- Ekmekçi
- Elmalar
- Erkenez
- Eskinarlı
- Eyüp Sultan
- Ferhuş
- Fevzipaşa
- Gaffarlı
- Gazipaşa
- Genç Osman
- Göllü
- Güneşevler
- Güzelyurt
- Hacıeyüplü
- Halkaçayırı
- İsa Divanlı
- İsmetpaşa
- İstasyon
- Kabasakal
- Kanuni
- Kapıçam
- Karamanlı
- Karataş
- Karaziyaret
- Karşıyaka
- Kartal
- Kayabaşı
- Kazanlıpınar
- Kemalli
- Kılağlı
- Kırım
- Kocalar
- Kozludere
- Küçüknacar
- Küpelikız
- Kurtuluş
- Kuzucak
- Maksutuşağı
- Mamaraş
- Mehmet Akif
- Menderes
- Namık Kemal
- Navruzlu
- Öksüzlü
- Osmanbey
- Peynirdere
- Pınarbaşı
- Sakarya
- Sarıkaya
- Senem Ayşe
- Şerefoğlu
- Şeyh Adil
- Şeyh Şamil
- Seyrantepe
- Sivricehüyük
- Söğütlü
- Sümer
- Sütçü Imam
- Tevekkelli
- Turan
- Ulutaş
- Yahya Kemal
- Yavuzselim
- Yenikent
- Yenipınar
- Yenişehir
- Yeniyurt
- Yeşiltepe
- Yusufhacılı
