= Uludağ =

Mountain in Bursa, Turkey

- Mount Olympus
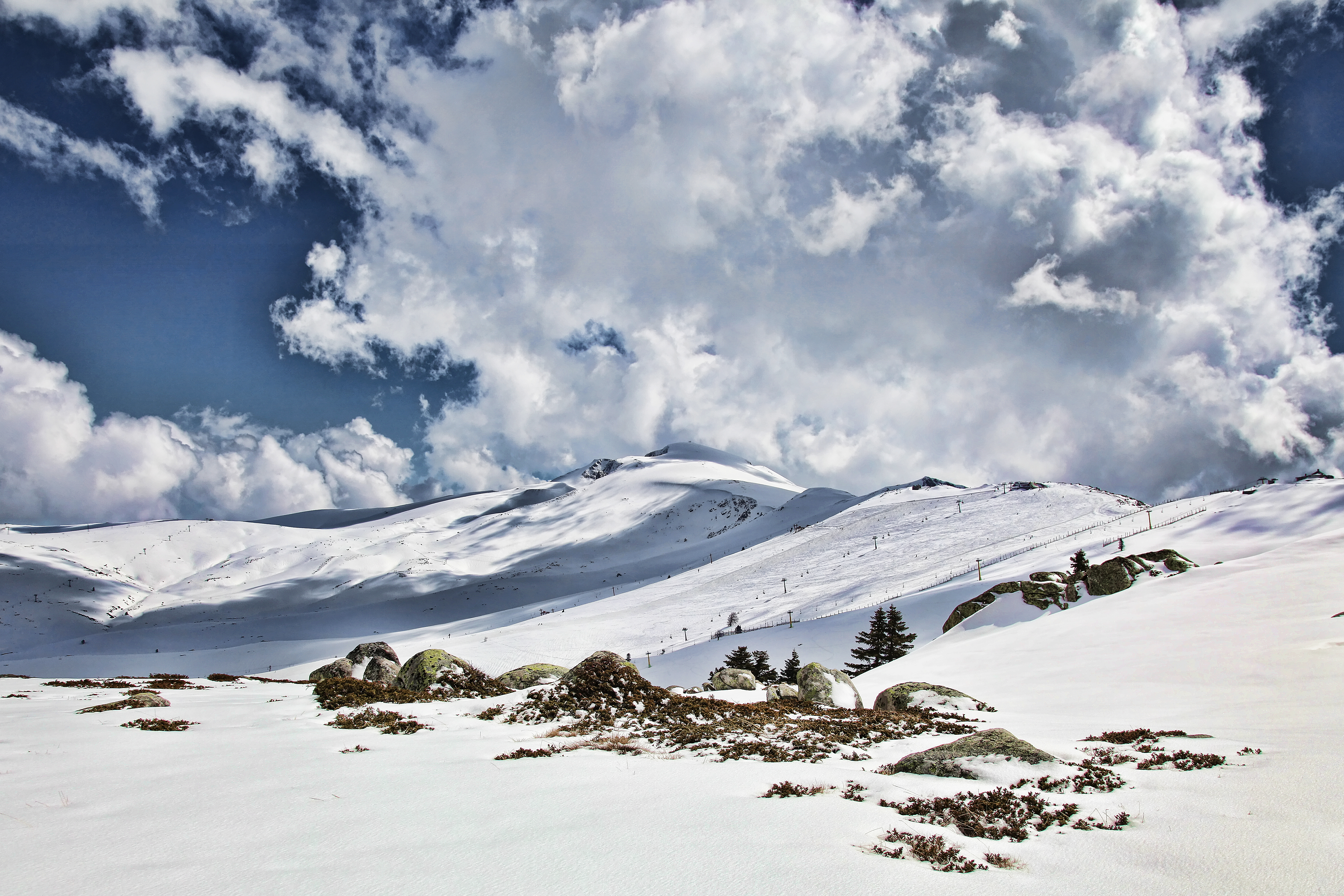

Highest point
- Elevation: 2,543 m (8,343 ft)
- Prominence: 1,504 m (4,934 ft)
- Listing: Ultra
- Coordinates: 40°04′14″N 29°13′18″E

Naming
- English translation: Great Mountain
- Language of name: Turkish

Geography
- Location within Turkey
- Location: Bursa Province, Turkey

Uludağ (Turkish pronunciation: [ˈuɫudaː]), known historically as Mysian or Bithynian Olympus (Greek: Όλυμπος), is a mountain in Bursa Province, Turkey, with an elevation of 2,543 m (8,343 ft).

Mt. Uludağ is the highest mountain of the Marmara region. Its highest peak is Kartaltepe at 2,543 m (8,343 ft). To the north are high plateaus: Sarıalan, Kirazlıyayla, Kadıyayla, and Sobra.

In Turkish, Uludağ means "great mountain". In ancient times, the range it is a part of, extending along the southern edge of Bithynia, was known as Olympos in Greek and Olympus in Latin, the western extremity being known as the Mysian Olympus and the eastern as the Bithynian Olympus, and the city of Bursa was known as Prusa ad Olympum from its position near the mountain. Throughout the Middle Ages, it contained hermitages and monasteries: "The rise of this monastic centre in the 8th c. and its prestige up to the 11th are linked to the resistance of numerous monks to the policy of the iconoclast emperors and then to a latent opposition to the urban, Constantinopolitan monasticism of the Studites." One of the greatest monks of the Christian East, the wonder-working Byzantine monk Saint Joannicius the Great, lived as a hermit on this mountain.

There is an abandoned wolfram mine near the summit. The mine and the integrated plant, which were built in 1974 for US$60 million, were closed in 1989 due to high production costs. The area is a popular center for winter sports such as skiing, and a national park of rich flora and fauna. Summer activities, such as trekking and camping, are also popular.

== Uludağ National Park Turkey ==
The highest point in western Anatolia, Uludağ is usually reached by car or gondola lift. The park is about 22 km (14 mi) south of Bursa and is signposted from there. Bursa can be reached by road from Istanbul. The gondola lift starts from Bursa and has a stopover in the alpine meadows of Kadiyayla at about 1,200 m (3,937 ft) elevation. It stops at Sarialan at about 1,630 m (5,348 ft).

Habitats of the park range from oak savanna, lowland deciduous forest and isolated maquis, through beech and fir mixed forest, to alpine meadows at the highest levels. It is a refuge for mountain birds, such as lammergeier and other vultures, golden eagle and more than 20 other raptor species. Other high-altitude species include alpine accentor, rock thrushes and choughs. The area is also good for eastern specialities such as isabelline wheatear, and, at almost the most westerly points of their range, red-fronted serin and Krüper's nuthatch. The dense fir forest holds short-toed treecreeper, common crossbill and Tengmalm's owl, a rare and very local bird in Turkey, as well as the white-backed woodpecker. The rare and local butterfly, Parnassius apollo graslini, is found on Uludag and the area has much of interest to botanists, with colourful pink primroses (Primula vulgaris var. sibthorpii), leopard's bane (Doronicum orientale), crocuses: the purple Crocus siberi and yellow Crocus flavus, and grape hyacinths (Muscari racemosum). There are also a few wolf packs roaming on the mountain.

== International winter sports events hosted ==
The ski resort hosted CEV Snow Volleyball European Tour events in 2017 and 2018.

== Gallery ==
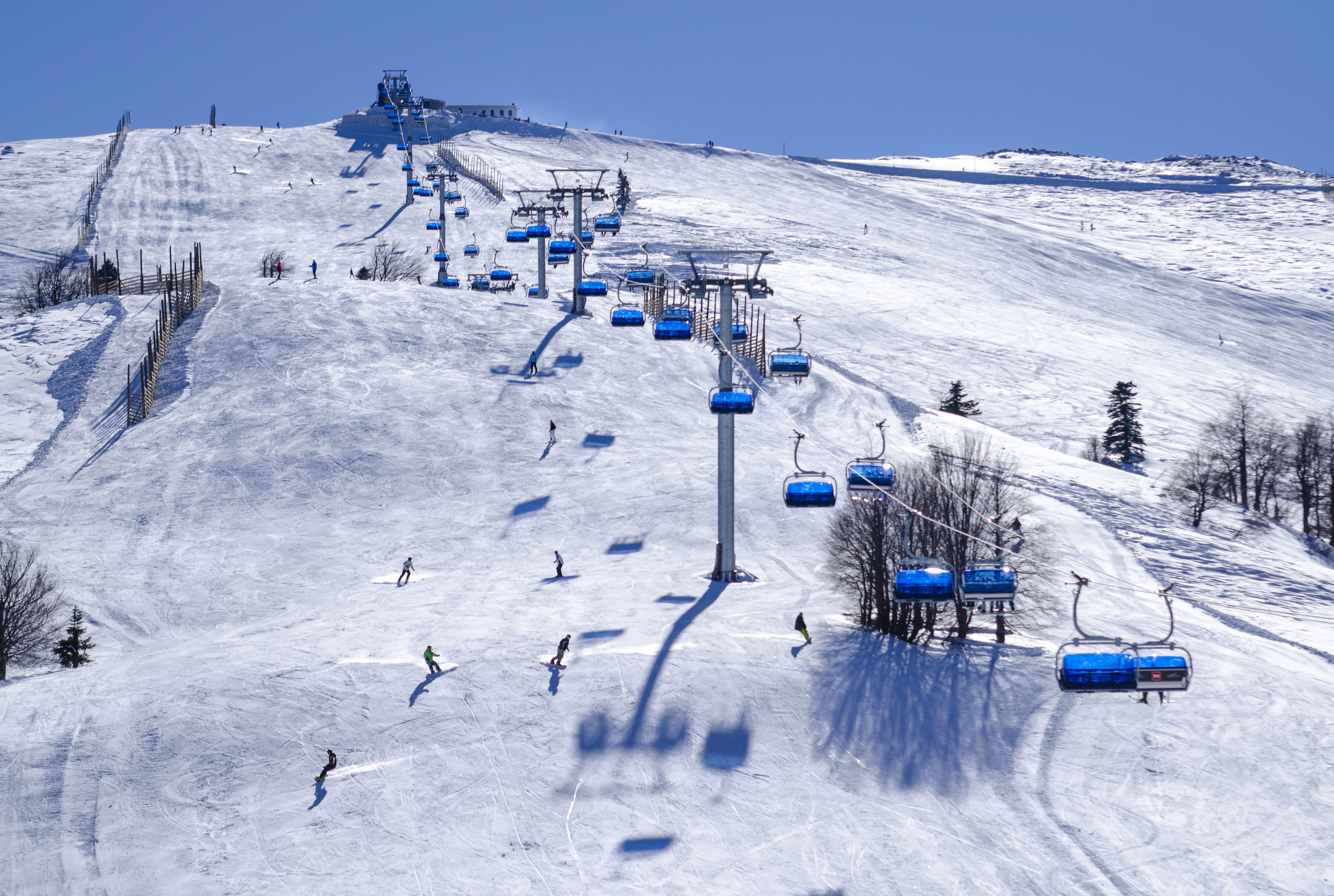
Skiing in January

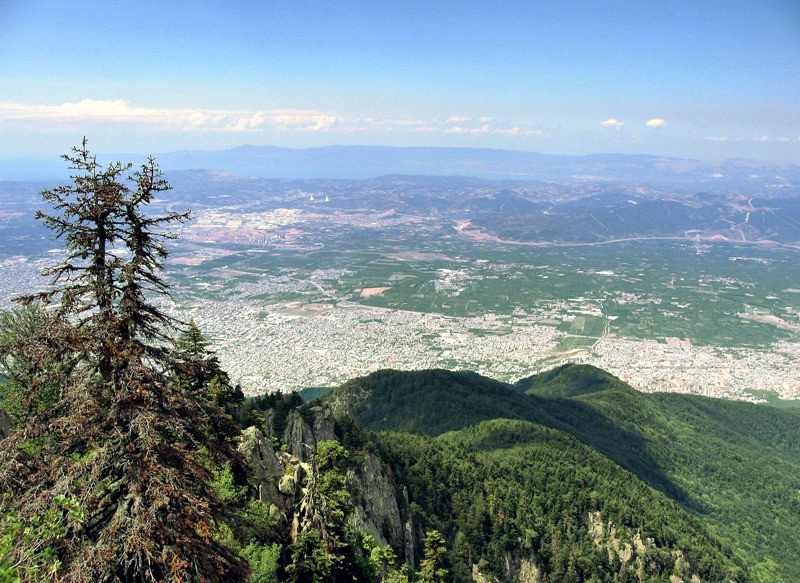
View of Bursa from the hills

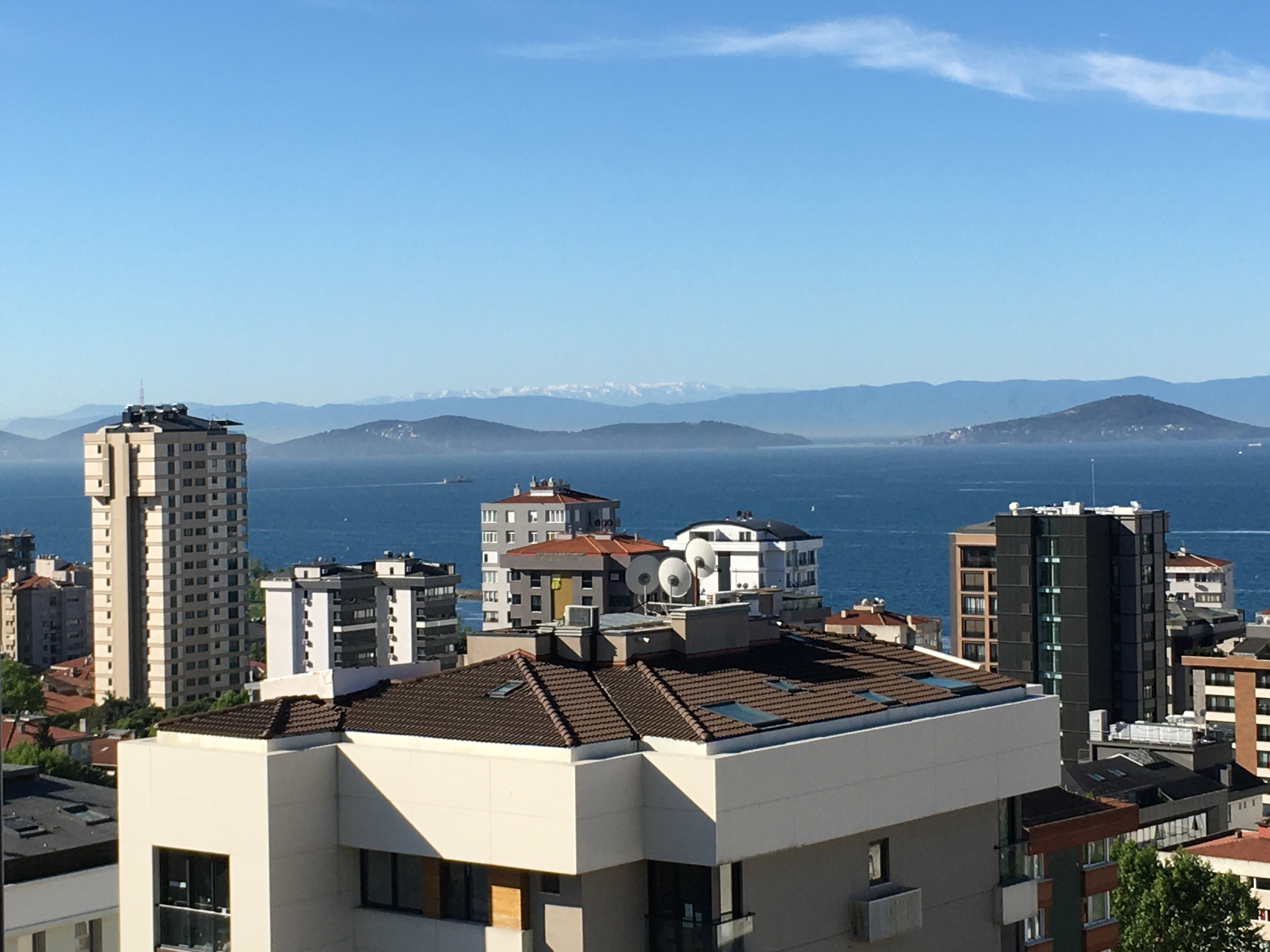
View from the Asian side of Istanbul (distance: 100.74 km / 62.6 mi)

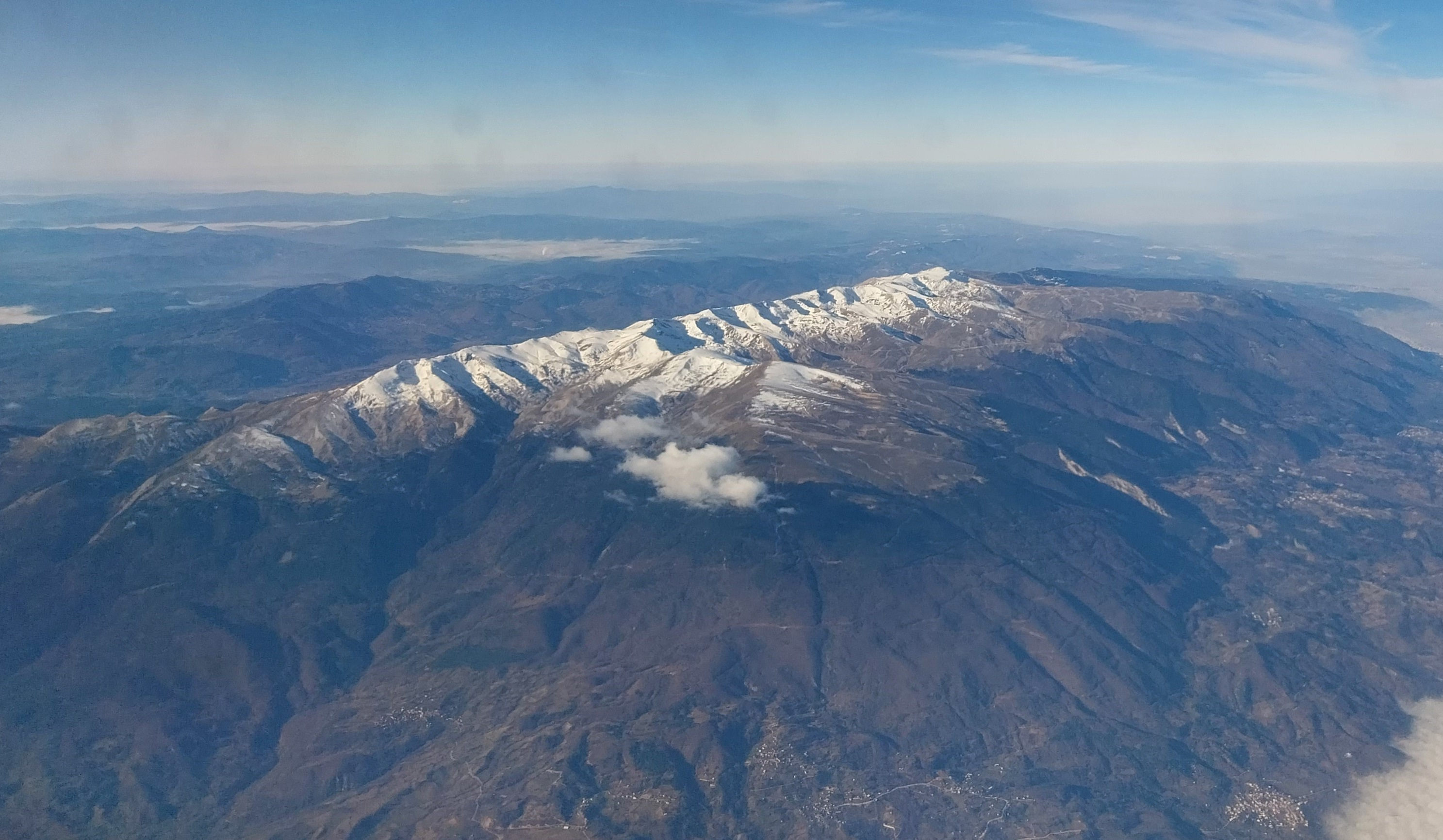
Aerial view

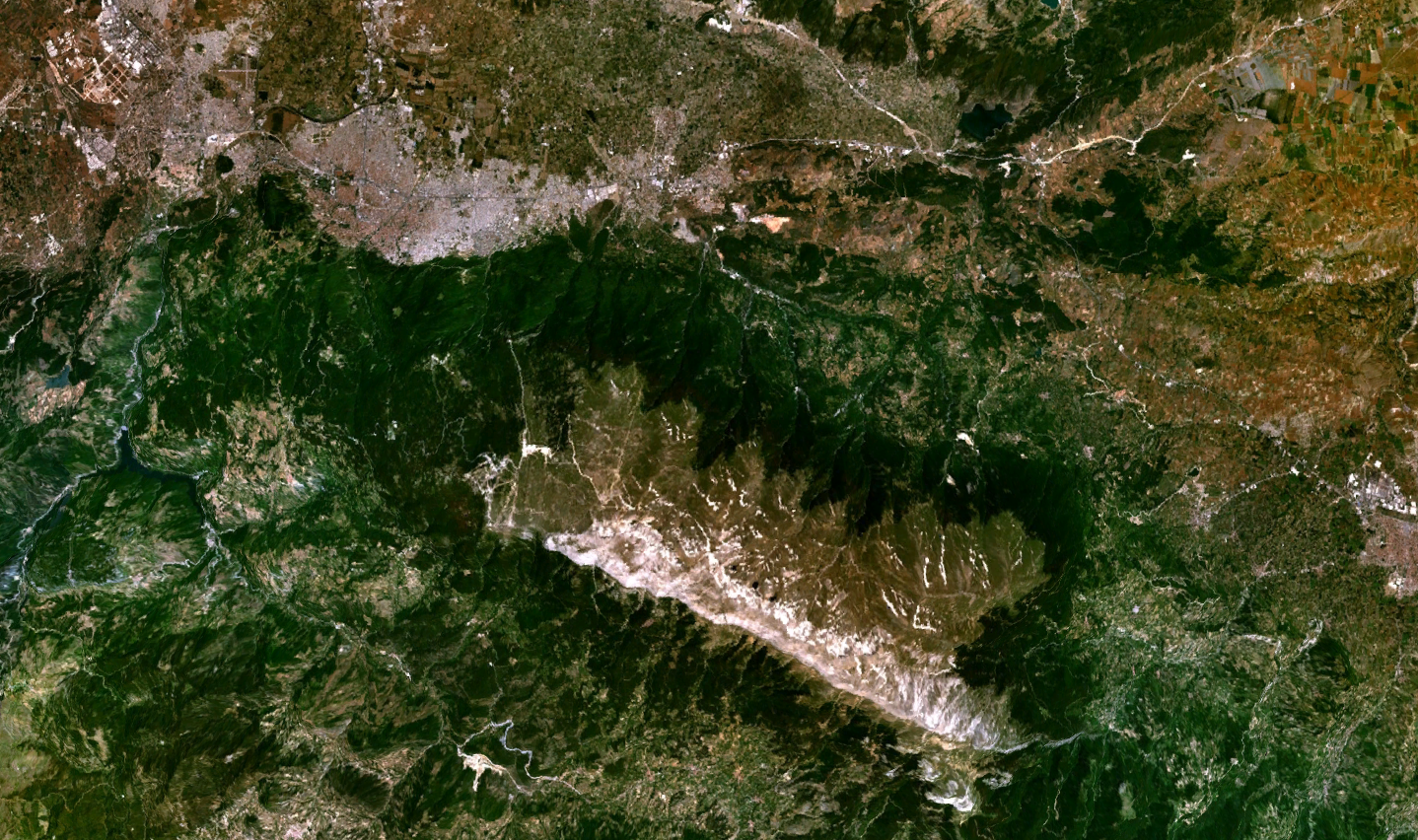
Satellite view with Bursa in the northwest

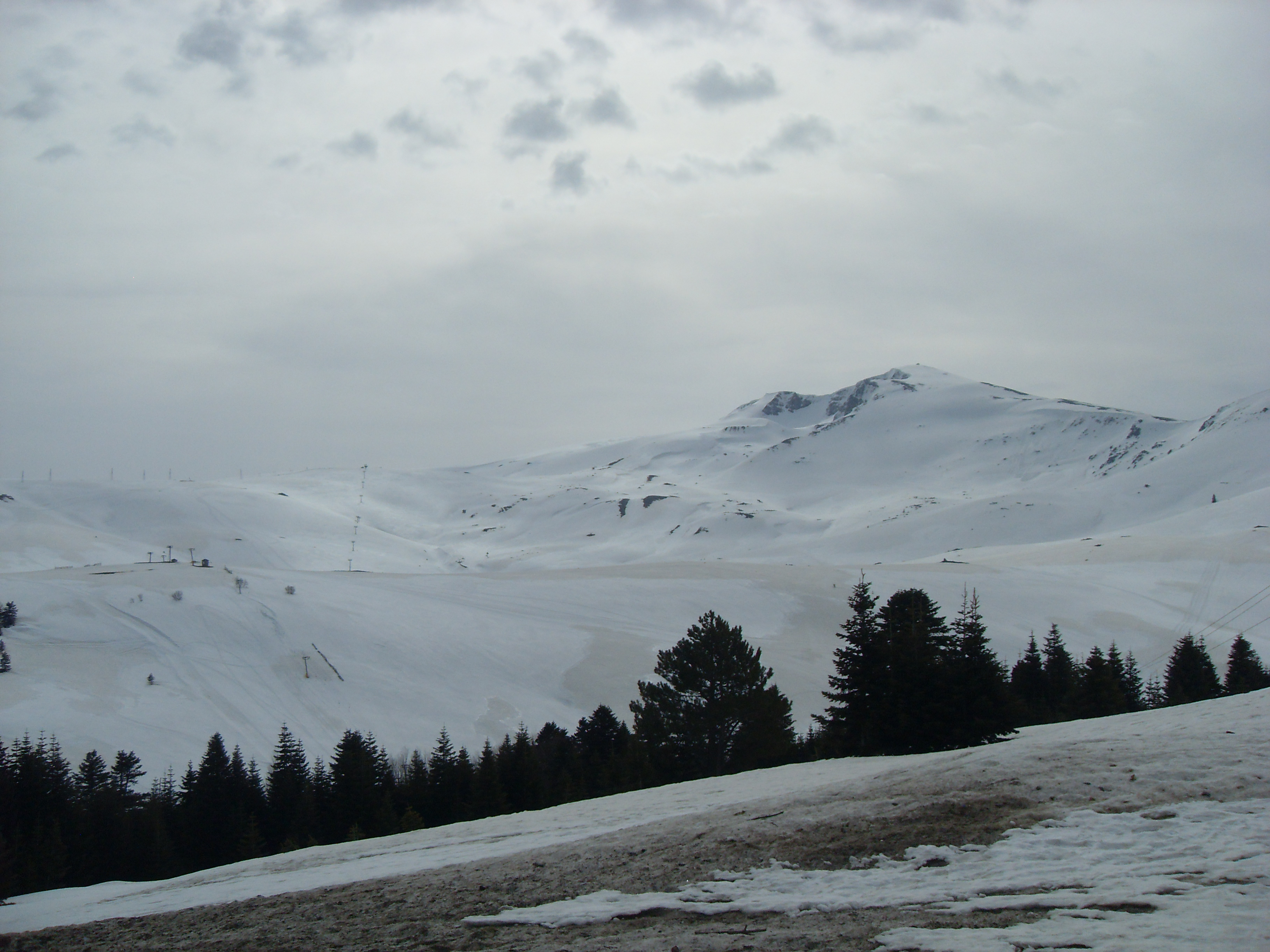
View

== See also ==
- List of ultras of West Asia
- Bursa Uludağ Gondola
- Battle of Mount Olympus
