= Erciyes Ski Resort =

Turkish ski resort

Erciyes ski resort
- Location within Turkey
- Location: Mount Erciyes
- Nearest city: Kayseri
- Coordinates: 38°32′31″N 35°31′30″E
- Top elevation: 3,346 m (10,978 ft)
- Lift system: 18 Lifts
- Website: www.erciyeskayakmerkezi.com

Erciyes Ski Resort is a ski resort in Turkey, near the city of Kayseri. It is situated at Mount Erciyes, the highest mountain in Central Anatolia.

The ski centre at Mt Erciyes is located on the north to east side of the mountain with the same name. It is a 3,917 m (12,851 ft) high volcanic peak and provides impressive views from all around. The ski resort is based around 2,100 m (6,900 ft) and is just 40 minutes from Kayseri International Airport. It is possible to try 'cultural skiing' on a visit to neighbouring Cappadocia which is located just an hour away from Kayseri. Mt Erciyes ski has a total of 150 km (93 mi) different levels of slopes and unlimited off-pistes.

== International winter sports events hosted ==
The ski resort hosted CEV Snow Volleyball European Tour events in [2017, 2019, and 2022.
