= Kahramanmaraş =

City in Turkey

- Metropolitan municipality
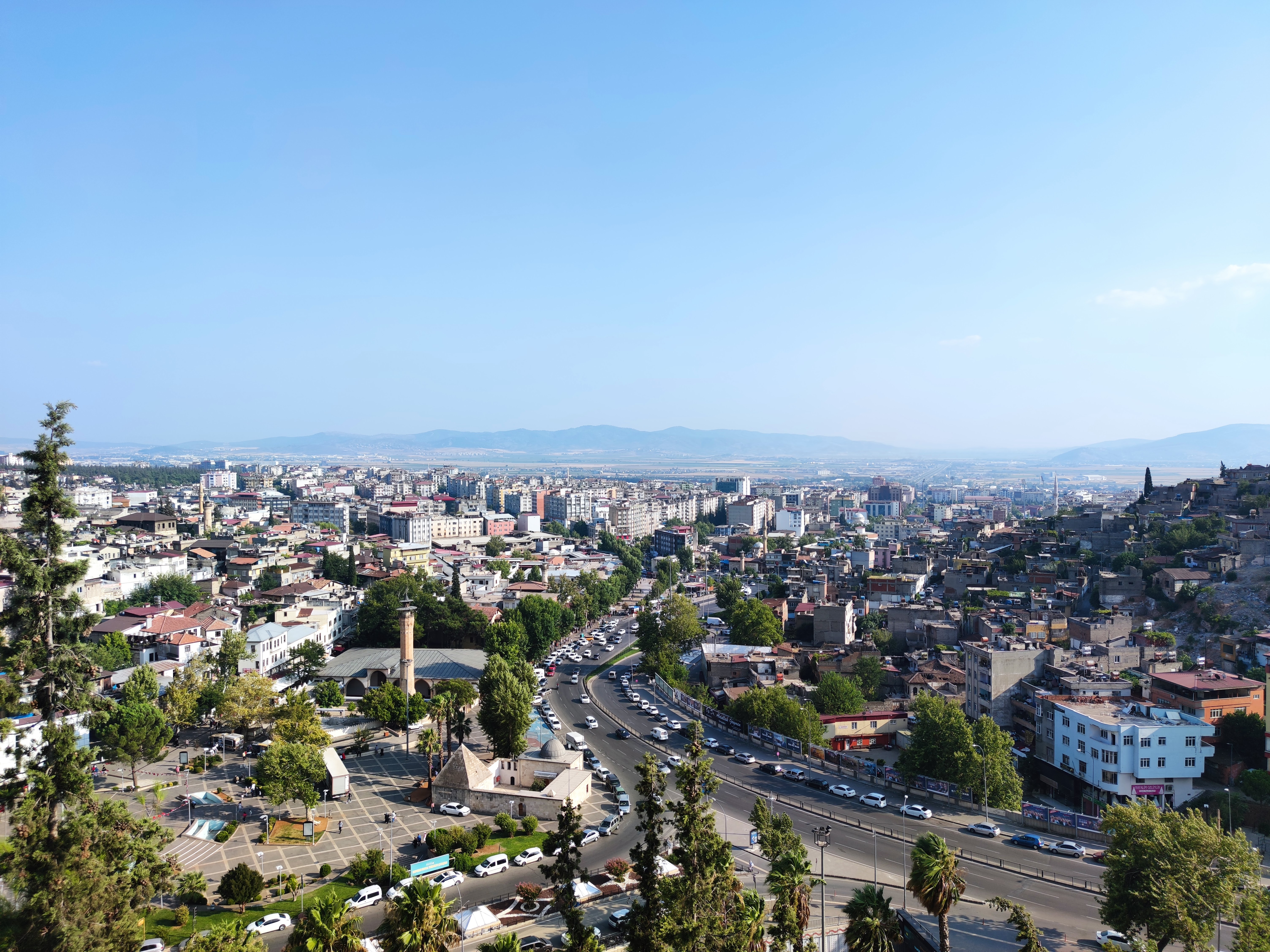
- A view of the city center in 2022

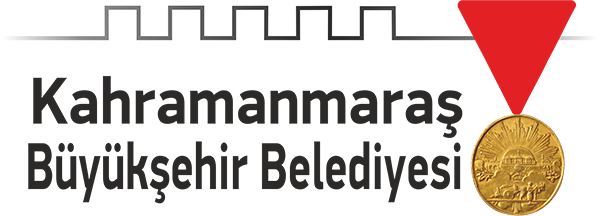
- Emblem of Kahramanmaraş Municipality

- Location within Turkey
- Coordinates: 37°35′N 36°56′E
- Country: Turkey
- Region: Mediterranean
- Province: Kahramanmaraş
- Elevation: 568 m (1,864 ft)

Population (2022)
  - Urban: 571,266
- Time zone: UTC+3 (TRT)
- Area code: 0344
- Licence plate: 46

Kahramanmaraş (Turkish pronunciation: [kahɾaˈmanmaɾaʃ]), historically Marash (Turkish: Maraş; Armenian: Մարաշ) and Germanicea (Greek: Γερμανίκεια), is a city in the Mediterranean region of Turkey and the administrative centre of Kahramanmaraş province. After 1973, Maraş was officially named Kahramanmaraş with the prefix kahraman (Turkish word meaning "heroic") to commemorate the Battle of Marash. The city lies on a plain at the foot of Mount Ahır.

On 6 February 2023, much of the city was destroyed in the 2023 Turkey–Syria earthquakes which had their epicentre in Pazarcık and Elbistan in Kahramanmaraş province.

== History ==
=== Early history ===
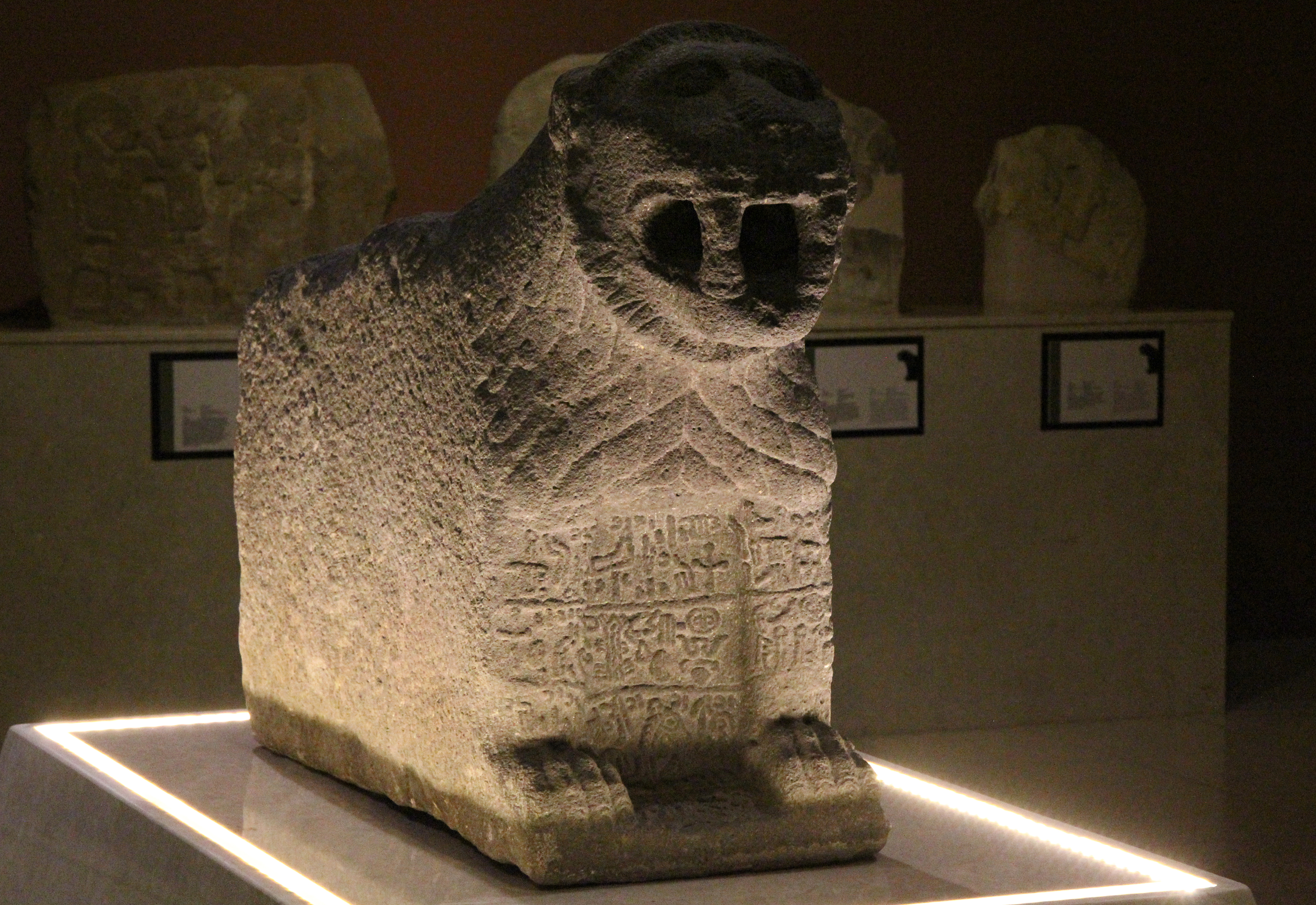
A statue in Kahramanmaraş Archaeology Museum

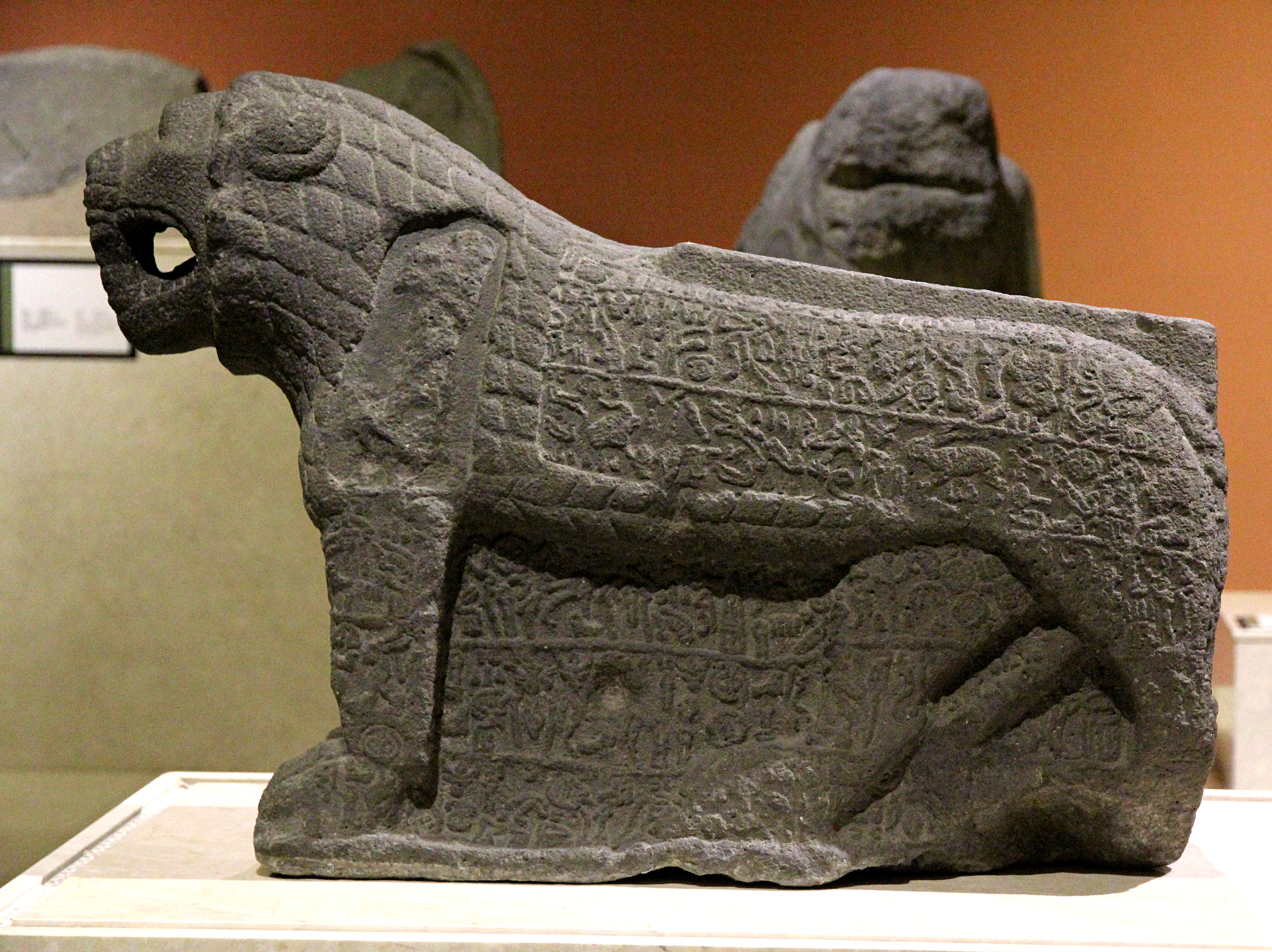
A statue in Kahramanmaraş Archaeology Museum

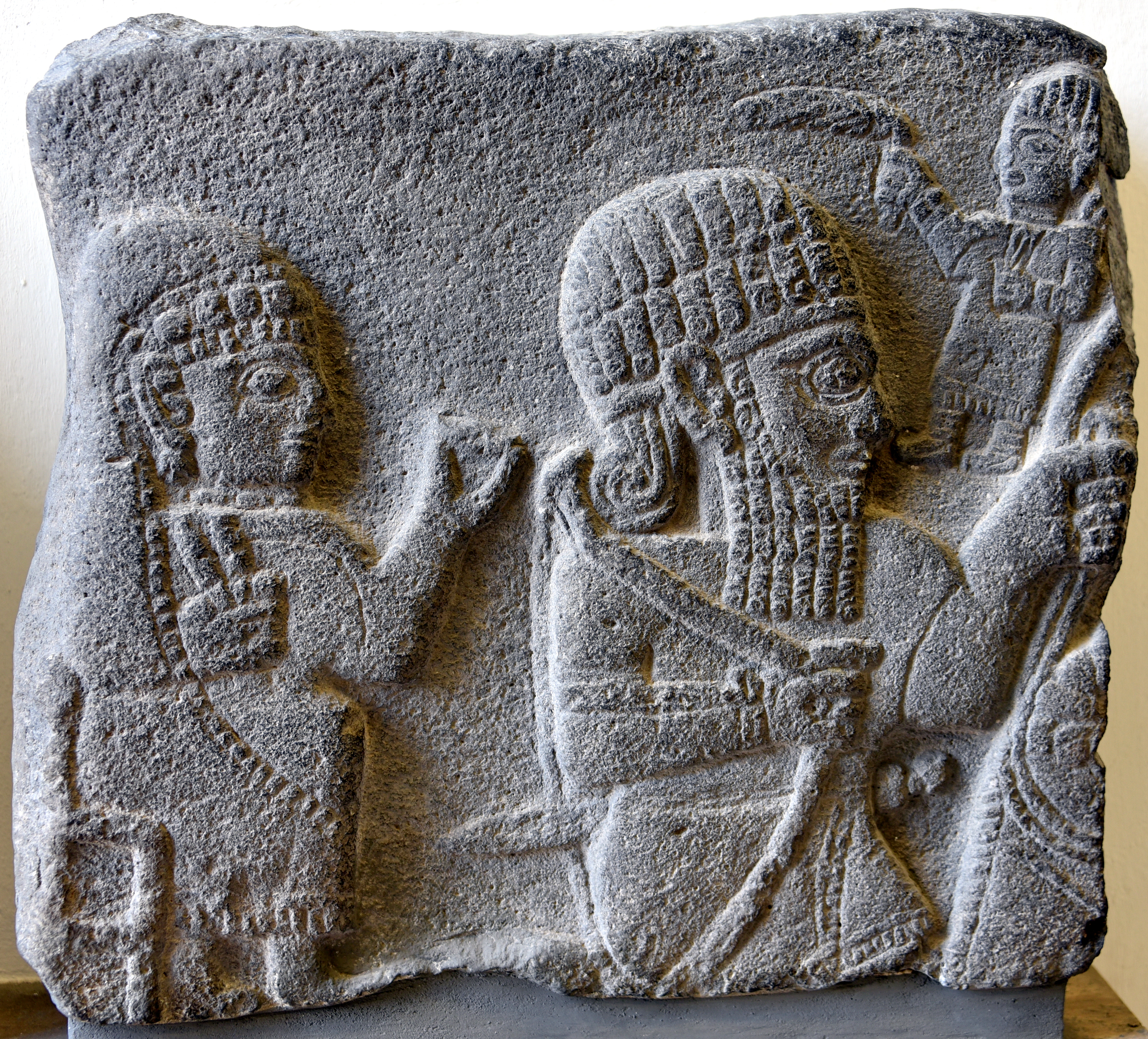
Fragment of a basalt stele showing a woman and a horse rider, Probably from Kahramanmaraş. 8th century BCE. Pergamon Museum.

In the early Iron Age (late 11th century BC to ca. 711 BC), Maraş was the capital city of the Syro-Hittite state Gurgum (Hieroglyphic Luwian Kurkuma). It was known as "the Kurkumaean city" to its Luwian inhabitants and as Marqas to the Assyrians. In 711 BC, the land of Gurgum was annexed as an Assyrian province and renamed Marqas after its capital.

Maraş was called Germanicia Caesarea (Ancient Greek: Γερμανίκεια, Germanikeia) by the Romans, which is a phonetic spelling Kermanicaeia/Germanicaeia and Kermanicia/Germanicia, in the time of the Roman and Byzantine empires. Various and often inaccurate, wrong and incorrect spellings, misattributions and confusions of names, words or toponyms, during Roman period, were very common. According to a 2010 Cumhuriyet article, the first ruins of the Kurkumaean settlement have already been unearthed in the Dulkadiroğulları quarters of the city.

=== Medieval period ===
During the Byzantine Empire, Germanikeia was seat of an eparch and one of the city's eparch participated in the First Council of Nicea. The city was lost to the Muslims in the 7th century and during the rule of al-Mansur the whole Christian population of the Germanikeia valley was deported and resettled at Ramla in Palestine. The city was the major site of the Byzantine Germanikeia campaign. After the fall of the Armenian kingdoms in the 11th century the city became an important stronghold for the exiled Armenians and the city became the capital of the short-lived principality of Philaretos Brachamios that at times included Antioch and Edessa.

After Philaretos's death, another Armenian general named Tatoul took over the city and hosted the exhausted army of the First Crusade for four days before it moved on to the Siege of Antioch. According to the Chronicle of Matthew of Edessa, it was destroyed by an earthquake and 40,000 people were killed on the 12th of the month of Mareri in the Armenian year 563 (November 29, 1114). In 1100, the city was captured by the Danishmends, followed by the Seljuks in 1103. In 1107, Crusaders led by Tancred retook it with aid from Toros I of Cilician Armenia. In 1136-1137, the Danishmends besieged Kahramanmaraş unsuccessfully, but devastated the surrounding villages. However, the Crusaders retook it in 1137. The city was captured in 1148 by prince Kilij Arslan.

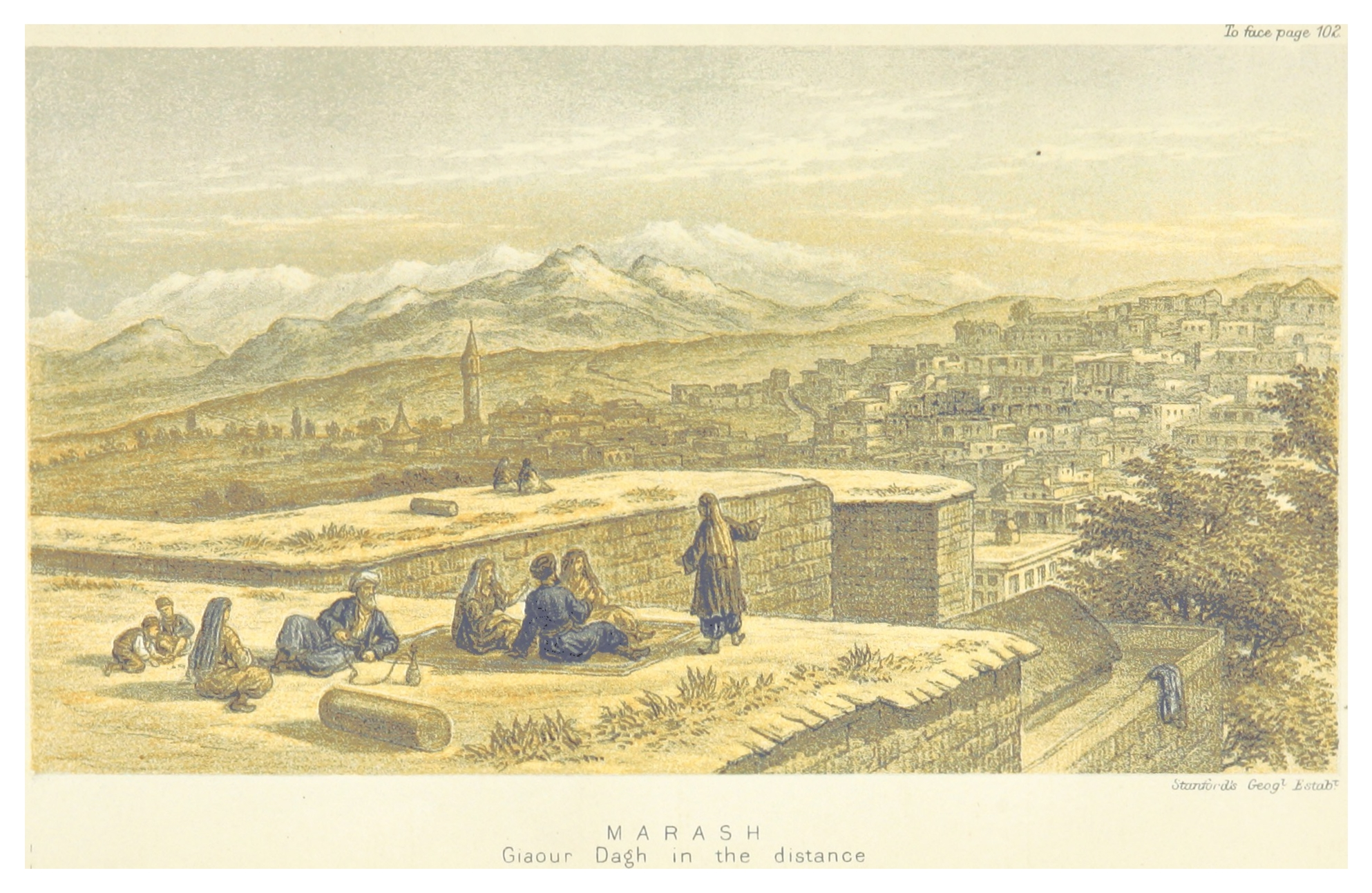
Panorama view (c1875)

Marash was ruled by the Beylik of Dulkadir as vassals of the Mamluk Empire from 1337 to 1515 before being annexed to the Ottoman Empire. In the early days of Ottoman rule (1525–6) there were 1,557 adult males (total population 7,500); at this time all the inhabitants were Muslims, but later a substantial number of non-Muslims migrated to the city, mainly in the 19th century.

=== Modern period ===
Around Maras, Armenians from Kishifli, Dere Keoy, and Fundijak chose to fight the Ottoman army to oppose deportation. On the morning of 26 July 1915, they attacked and burned six Turkish villages and their crops. Due to Muslim conscription for World War One, victims were women, children, and the elderly. In response, the Turkish army began a siege of Fundijak under Ali Bey on August 1. 91 captured fighters were executed, and another 100 were deported. The Turkish losses were estimated at 2,000 soldiers and between 4,000 and 5,000 villagers, while the Armenians lost 2,100, mostly civilians.

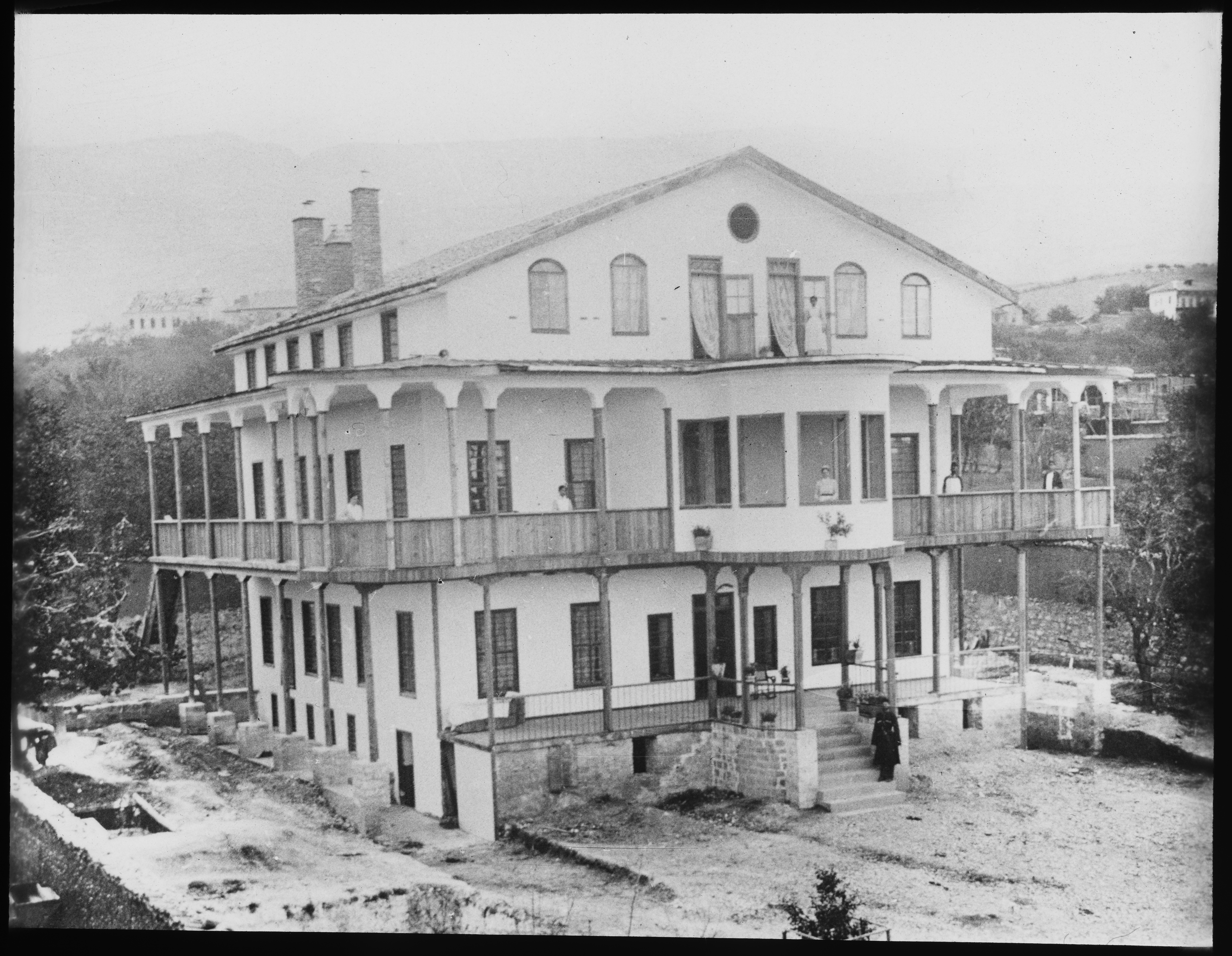
An old antique photo of Marasch Hospital between 1905 and 1917

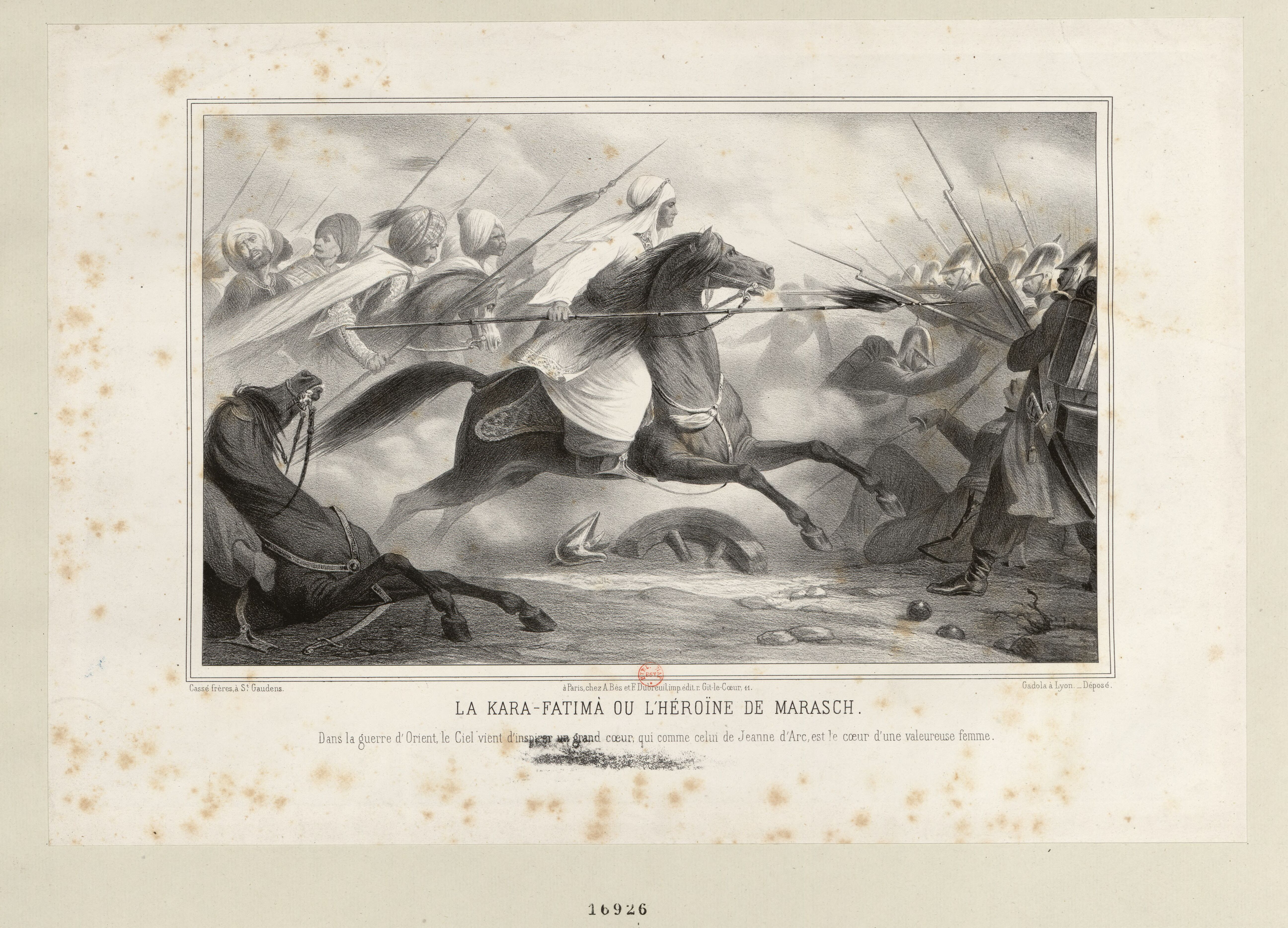
La Kara - Fatima or the heroine of Marasch, the Crimean War (1853-1856)

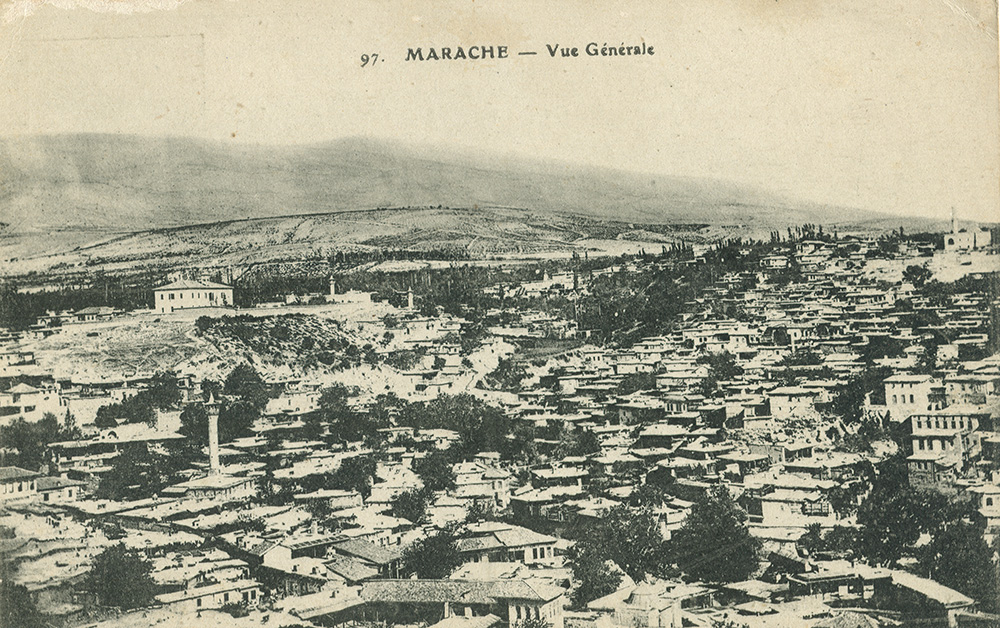
A panoramic view of Marash (1900s, postcard).

In the months following the end of the war, Cilicia had also become a source of dispute between the British and French, who both aspired to establish influence in the region. The British government, however, was under strong domestic pressure to withdraw and demobilize its forces in the Middle East and on 15 September 1919, Prime Minister David Lloyd George begrudgingly accepted a proposal by Prime Minister Georges Clemenceau to have the French formally assume control of Cilicia. The transfer of command took place on 4 November, but Field Marshal Ferdinand Foch's promise to reinforce the existing forces in the area with at least 32 infantry battalions, 20 cavalry squadrons and 14 artillery batteries went unfulfilled. The French units were thus deprived of armoured cars and air support and lacked automatic weapons, heavy artillery and even wireless transmitters and carrier pigeons.

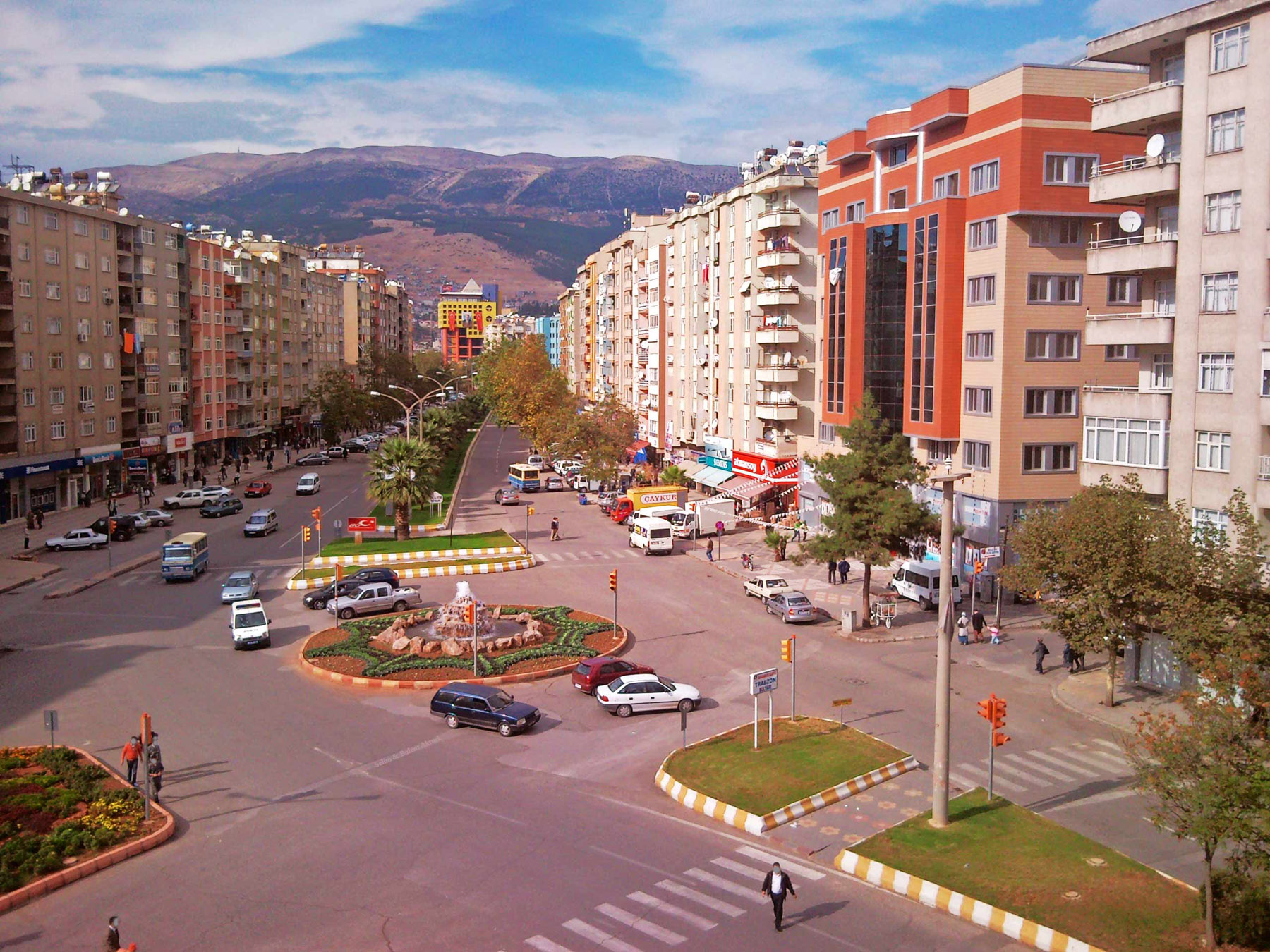
Trabzon street, Kahramanmaraş city center

==== Post Turkish Independence ====
In December 1978, the Maraş Massacre of leftist Alevis took place in the city. A Turkish nationalist group, the Grey Wolves, incited the violence that left more than 100 dead. The incident was important in the Turkish government's decision to declare martial law, and the eventual military coup in 1980.

In February 2023, a powerful 7.8 magnitude earthquake struck near Kahramanmaraş, causing widespread damage to the city, leaving more than 50,000 people dead. The city center was hardest-hit as many homes were destroyed. An estimated 17.37 percent of the city was destroyed.

== Demographics ==
Year	Population
1525–6	7,500
1564–5	13,500
1914	32,700
1927	25,672
1940	27,744
1945	33,104
1950	34,641
1960	54,447
1970	110,761
1980	178,557
2009	399,783
2013	458,860
2017	513,582
2021	559,873

In 1904, Mark Sykes recorded Marash as a city inhabited by Armenians and Turks. Ephraim K. Jernazian estimated that in 1913 the city was home to 45 thousand Turks and 30 thousand Armenians, while other ethnic groups had very small representation. Stanley Kerr reported Turks comprised 75% of the population. Ottoman censuses from the time are not fully reliable for many reasons, one of which being that during census taking every household was assumed to have 5 residents.

The Armenian population of Maraş, like many other Armenian communities in Turkey. Maraş was the site of massacres and deportations of Armenians, who were subjected to violence, harassment, looting and appropriation of property, and were forced to flee. In 1915, Armenians from Marash villages attacked and burned six Turkish villages and their crops. 4,000-5,000 Turkish villagers died, and the Turkish forces lost 2,000 soldiers. This would severely accelerate the deportation process for Armenians in Marash. A total of 20,000 Armenians from Marash would be deported, as local officials intentionally grouped the local population under the deportation orders for 'foreign armies'.

During the Turkish War of Independence, the French army occupied Maraş, and some Armenians returned to the city as French legionnaires, in addition to returning locals. In February 1920, Turkish nationalist forces regained control from the French, resulting in a massacre of the Armenian population. The official French report stated that the victims did "not exceed 5,000", though the initial estimates varied. According to Dr. Robert Lambert's report to the American Board of Commissioners for Foreign Missions, 4,500 Turks were killed during the battle.

In modern Turkey, data on the ethnic makeup of the country is not officially collected, though estimates exist. Kahramanmaraş is currently predominantly populated by Turkish and also Kurdish people, with a small Armenian population. The population of the city was 571,266 as of 2022. In February 2023, a powerful 7.8 magnitude earthquake struck near Kahramanmaraş, causing widespread damage to the city and leaving more than 50,000 people dead.

== Geography ==
The city center is 568 meters above sea level. Ceyhan River, which originates from the mountains surrounding Elbistan Plain is the most important hydrological feature in the city.

=== Climate ===
Köppen map of Kahramanmaraş Province and surrounding regions:
- BSk
- Csa
- Dsa
- Dsb
- Dsc

Kahramanmaraş has a Mediterranean climate (Köppen: Csa, Trewartha: Cs) with continental influences from the surrounding northern areas. Summers are very hot and dry with a daytime average of 35 °C (95 °F) but temperatures can reach 40 °C (104 °F) quite easily. The highest recorded temperature is 47.2 °C (117.0 °F) on 14 August 2023. Winters are cool and wet with daytime temperatures typically in the 5–10 °C (41–50 °F) range. The coldest temperature recorded is −9.6 °C (14.7 °F) on 6 February 1997.

Climate data for Kahramanmaraş (1991–2020, extremes 1930–2023)
Month	Jan	Feb	Mar	Apr	May	Jun	Jul	Aug	Sep	Oct	Nov	Dec	Year
Record high °C (°F)	18.7 (65.7)	25.3 (77.5)	29.8 (85.6)	36.0 (96.8)	39.3 (102.7)	42.0 (107.6)	45.2 (113.4)	47.2 (117.0)	42.5 (108.5)	38.6 (101.5)	29.6 (85.3)	24.0 (75.2)	47.2 (117.0)
Mean daily maximum °C (°F)	9.5 (49.1)	11.6 (52.9)	16.5 (61.7)	21.8 (71.2)	27.4 (81.3)	32.8 (91.0)	36.5 (97.7)	36.9 (98.4)	33.1 (91.6)	26.6 (79.9)	17.8 (64.0)	11.3 (52.3)	23.5 (74.3)
Daily mean °C (°F)	5.2 (41.4)	6.7 (44.1)	11.0 (51.8)	15.6 (60.1)	20.6 (69.1)	25.7 (78.3)	28.9 (84.0)	29.2 (84.6)	25.6 (78.1)	19.6 (67.3)	11.8 (53.2)	6.9 (44.4)	17.2 (63.0)
Mean daily minimum °C (°F)	1.9 (35.4)	2.7 (36.9)	6.3 (43.3)	10.3 (50.5)	14.8 (58.6)	19.5 (67.1)	22.8 (73.0)	23.0 (73.4)	19.2 (66.6)	13.8 (56.8)	7.4 (45.3)	3.6 (38.5)	12.1 (53.8)
Record low °C (°F)	−9.0 (15.8)	−9.6 (14.7)	−7.6 (18.3)	−1.8 (28.8)	4.7 (40.5)	6.6 (43.9)	12.4 (54.3)	12.5 (54.5)	4.0 (39.2)	0.0 (32.0)	−4.4 (24.1)	−7.6 (18.3)	−9.6 (14.7)
Average precipitation mm (inches)	130.2 (5.13)	118.0 (4.65)	95.8 (3.77)	74.6 (2.94)	42.7 (1.68)	6.8 (0.27)	2.4 (0.09)	1.9 (0.07)	17.3 (0.68)	45.3 (1.78)	89.5 (3.52)	126.4 (4.98)	750.9 (29.56)
Average precipitation days	10.77	10.07	9.90	9.73	7.23	2.10	0.50	0.77	2.47	6.40	7.20	9.23	76.4
Average snowy days	2.6	0.8	0.3	0	0	0	0	0	0	0	0	0.1	3.8
Average relative humidity (%)	70.1	65.5	59.3	57.4	54.6	49.6	50.3	51.5	49.3	54.4	63.1	71.0	58.0
Mean monthly sunshine hours	102.3	115.8	164.3	195.0	248.0	297.0	319.3	297.6	252.0	198.4	135.0	99.2	2,423.9
Mean daily sunshine hours	3.3	4.1	5.3	6.5	8.0	9.9	10.3	9.6	8.4	6.4	4.5	3.2	6.6
Source 1: Turkish State Meteorological Service
Source 2: NOAA (humidity, 1991–2020), Meteomanz(snow days 2017-2023)

== Notable people ==
- Leo III, Byzantine emperor (717 – June 18, 741)
- Nestorius, 5th-century religious leader
- Khwaja Sadid ad-Din Huzaifa al-Marashi, early guide in tasawwuf/Sufi
- Veysi Kaynak, Turkish politician from the Justice and Development Party (AKP) who currently serves as a Deputy Prime Minister of Turkey
- Ben Bagdikian, Armenian-American journalist, news media critic and commentator
- Mike Gulian, sometimes known as the Armenian Prince, Ottoman Empire-born player of American football
- Emine Hatun, principal consort of Sultan Mehmed I of the Ottoman Empire
- Soner Sarikabadayi, Turkish singer
- Necip Fazıl Kısakürek, Turkish poet and writer (by ancestry)
- George E. White, American missionary and witness to the Armenian Genocide
- Necmettin Hacıeminoğlu, Turkish writer

== See also ==
- Anatolian Tigers
- Cilicia War
- Domuztepe
- Dulkadiroğlu, Kahramanmaraş
- Onikişubat
- Kahramanmaraş Sütçüimam University (KSU)

== Twin towns – sister cities ==
Kahramanmaraş is twinned with:

- Houston, United States
- Jackson, United States
- Nalchik, Russia
- Cazin, Bosnia and Herzegovina
