= Wagrain =

- Municipality
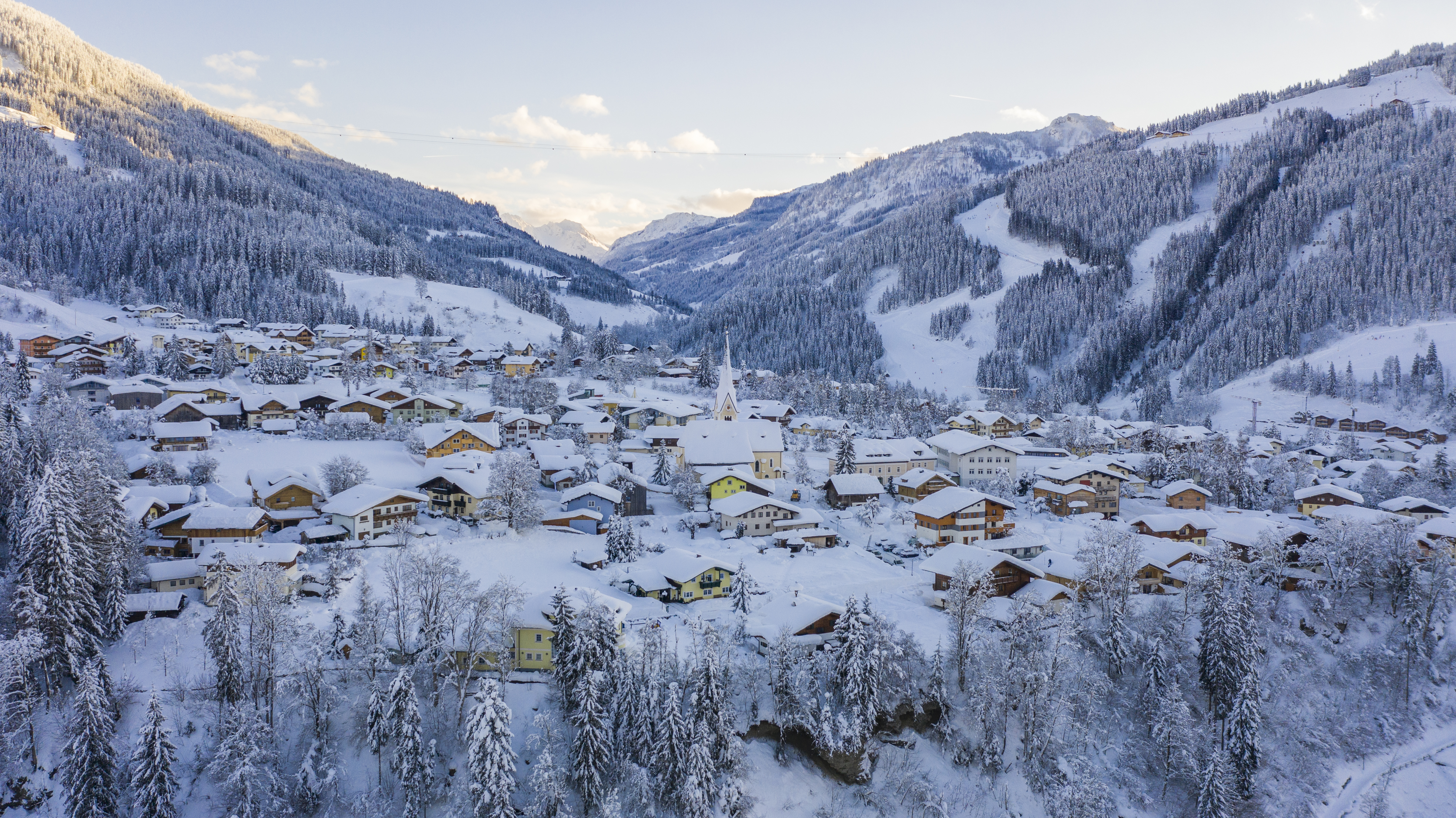

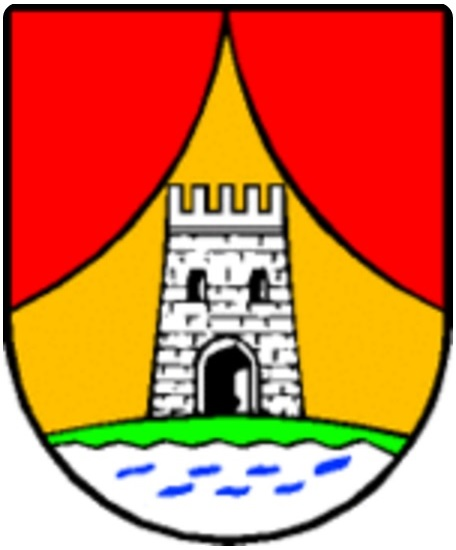
- Coat of arms

- Location within Austria
- Coordinates: 47°20′0″N 13°18′0″E
- Country: Austria
- State: Salzburg
- District: St. Johann im Pongau

Government
  - Mayor: Axel Ellmer (ÖVP)

Area
  - Total: 50.55 km^{2} (19.52 sq mi)
- Elevation: 838 m (2,749 ft)

Population (2025-01-01)
  - Total: 3,177
  - Density: 62.85/km^{2} (162.8/sq mi)
- Time zone: UTC+1 (CET)
  - Summer (DST): UTC+2 (CEST)
- Postal code: 5602
- Area code: 0 6413
- Vehicle registration: JO
- Website: www.wagrain.salzburg.at

Wagrain (Austro-Bavarian: Wågroã) is a market town in the St. Johann im Pongau District in the Austrian state of Salzburg. It is located in a high valley stretching from the Salzach at Sankt Johann in the west to the Enns river in the east. The municipality includes the Katastralgemeinden Hof, Hofmarkt, Schwaighof and Vorderkleinarl. The population is about 3,020.

== History ==
The settlement of Wakrein in the Archbishopric of Salzburg was first mentioned in a 1243 deed. Originally a mining area, Wagrain in the early 18th century was a centre of Crypto-protestantism within the Catholic country. About 1732/33 Prince-Archbishop Count Leopold Anton von Firmian had the Protestant population expelled; most were received by King Frederick William I of Prussia and re-settled the East Prussian province, which had been devastated by the plague.

Today Wagrain mainly depends on tourism. It is nestled in the valley of the Ski Amadé resorts, one of the largest ski resort networks in Europe. In the summer the ski lifts transport bikers to the mountains for the summer mountain biking season.

Wagrain is the original home of Atomic Skis, which was founded in 1955 by Alois Rohrmoser, who bought a wheelwright shop, and expanded its production to include winter sports equipment, such as skis and sleds, using local timber resources and a crew of four craftsmen.

== Local council ==
Elections were held in 2014:

- 10 seats: ÖVP
- 6 seats: SPÖ
- 3 seats: FPÖ

== Transportation ==
Wagrain can be reached via the B 163 Wagrainer Straße highway linking Sankt Johann with Altenmarkt im Pongau and the Flachau junction of the Tauern Autobahn.

== Gallery ==
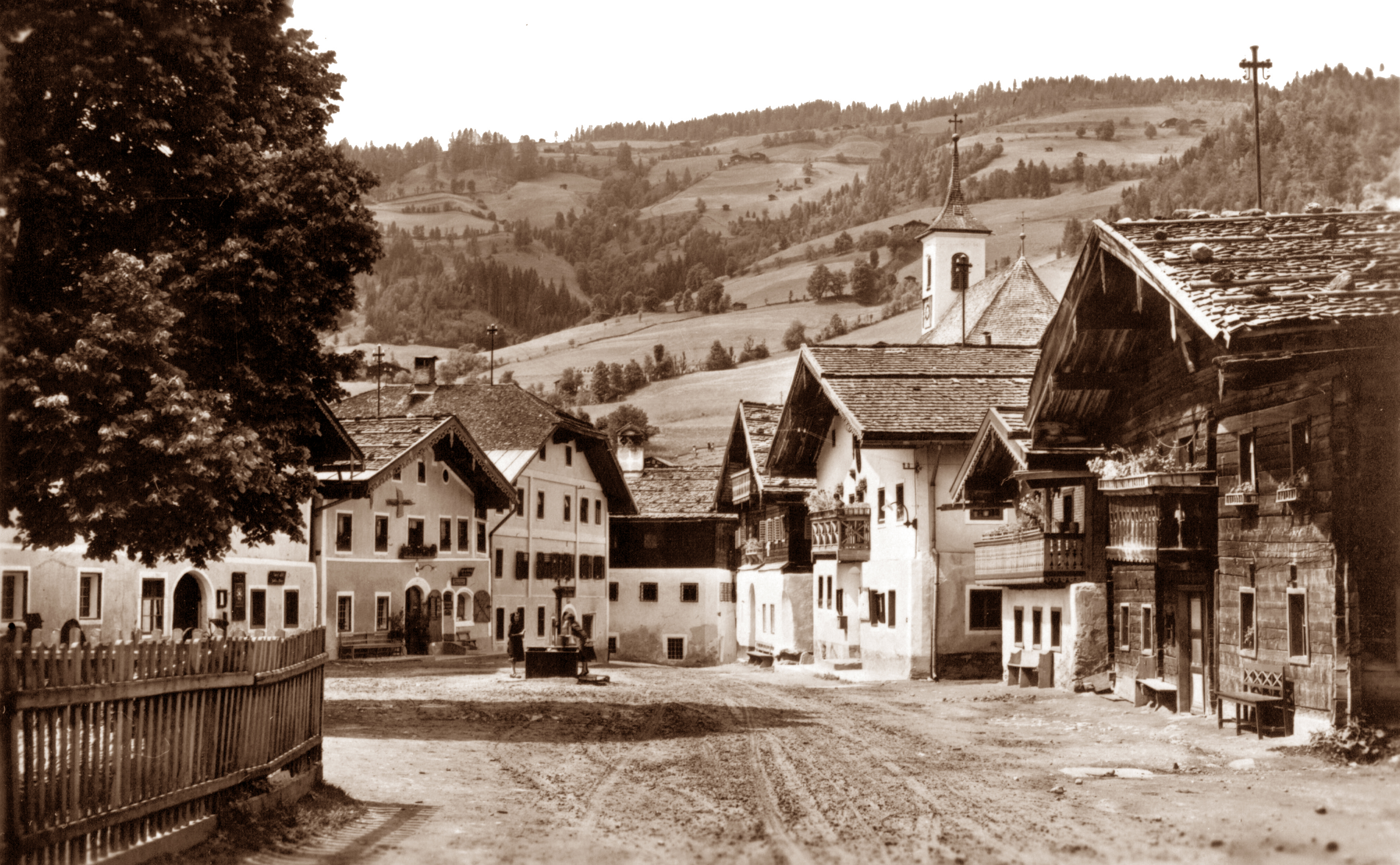
Wagrain market place in 1920

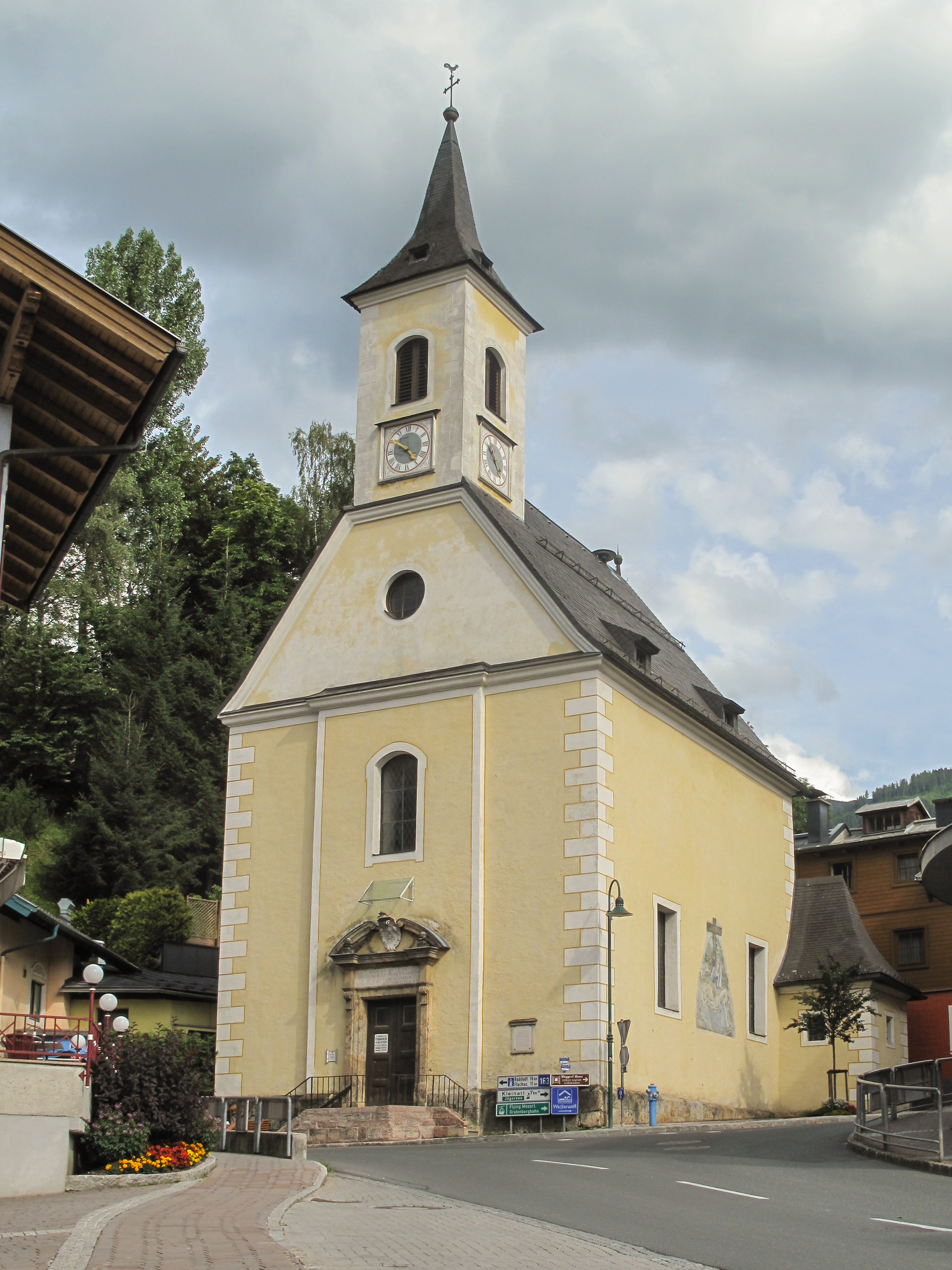
Local church

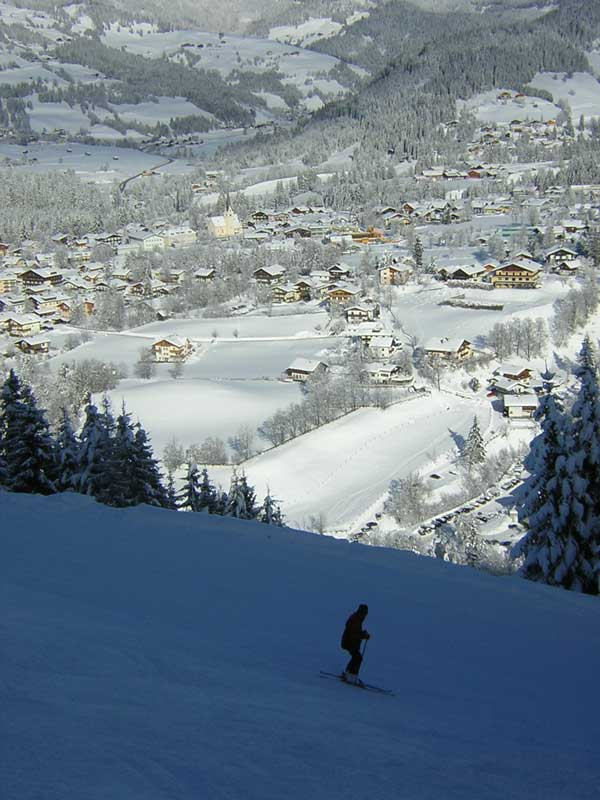
Wagrain in winter

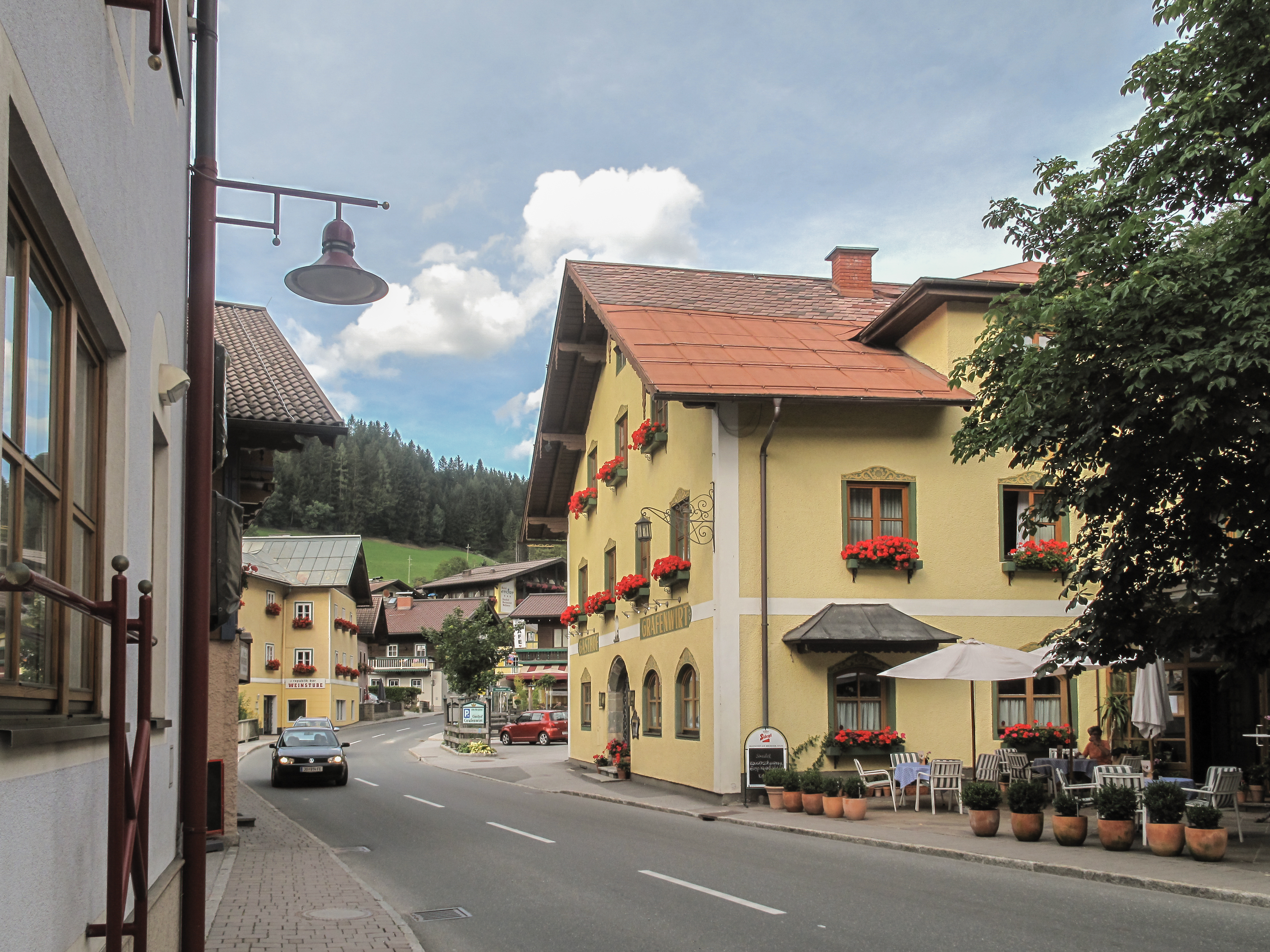
View of a street
