= Lesser Armenia =

Armenian Highlands region

Coordinates: 40.6900°N 39.6300°E

Lesser Armenia (Armenian: Փոքր Հայք, romanized: P’ok’r Hayk’; Latin: Armenia Minor; Ancient Greek: Mικρά Αρμενία, romanized: Mikrá Armenía), also known as Armenia Minor and Armenia Inferior, is a region in West Asia that comprised the Armenian-populated regions primarily to the west and northwest of the ancient Kingdom of Armenia (also known as Kingdom of Greater Armenia), on the western side of the Euphrates River. It was also a kingdom, separate from Greater Armenia, from the 2nd century BC to the 1st century AD. The region was later reorganized into the Armeniac Theme under the Byzantine Empire.

== Geography ==
The territory of Lesser Armenia fluctuated over time between 70,000 and 130,000 square kilometers. During its peak in the 3rd century BC, it included the right valley of the upper Western Euphrates basin (now Erzincan, Bayburt, Gümüşhane), the entire upper and middle basin of the Lykos or—in Armenian—Gail River (Sivas, Giresun), the entire upper basin of the Halys River (Tokat, Ordu), and the coastal regions of the Black Sea from the modern city of Batumi to the mouth of the Gail River (Artvin, Rize, Trabzon)․ The province of Hamshen, which remains Armenian-populated to this day, was almost entirely included within Lesser Armenia.

The borders of Lesser Armenia's administrative divisions underwent such frequent changes that it is impossible to determine their exact extent with precision. It consisted of three provinces․

- First Armenia: Located between Cappadocia and Pontus. Its main city was Caesarea. The territory included the cities of Eudokia, Pisa, Nicopolis, and Nyssa, the fortress-city of Tsamndav, and the Kizistra fortress.
- Second Armenia: Its main city was Sebastia. The province included the cities of Lasista, Avala, Tyurike, and Akn.
- Third Armenia: Its main city was Malatya, a prominent military and commercial center in Western Asia. The province included the cities of Samosata, Kesun, Bardzrberd, Rapan, Ulnia, and Pehetni, the town of Vardaher, and the fortresses of Parzman, Göksun, and Shahasp.
- Early history

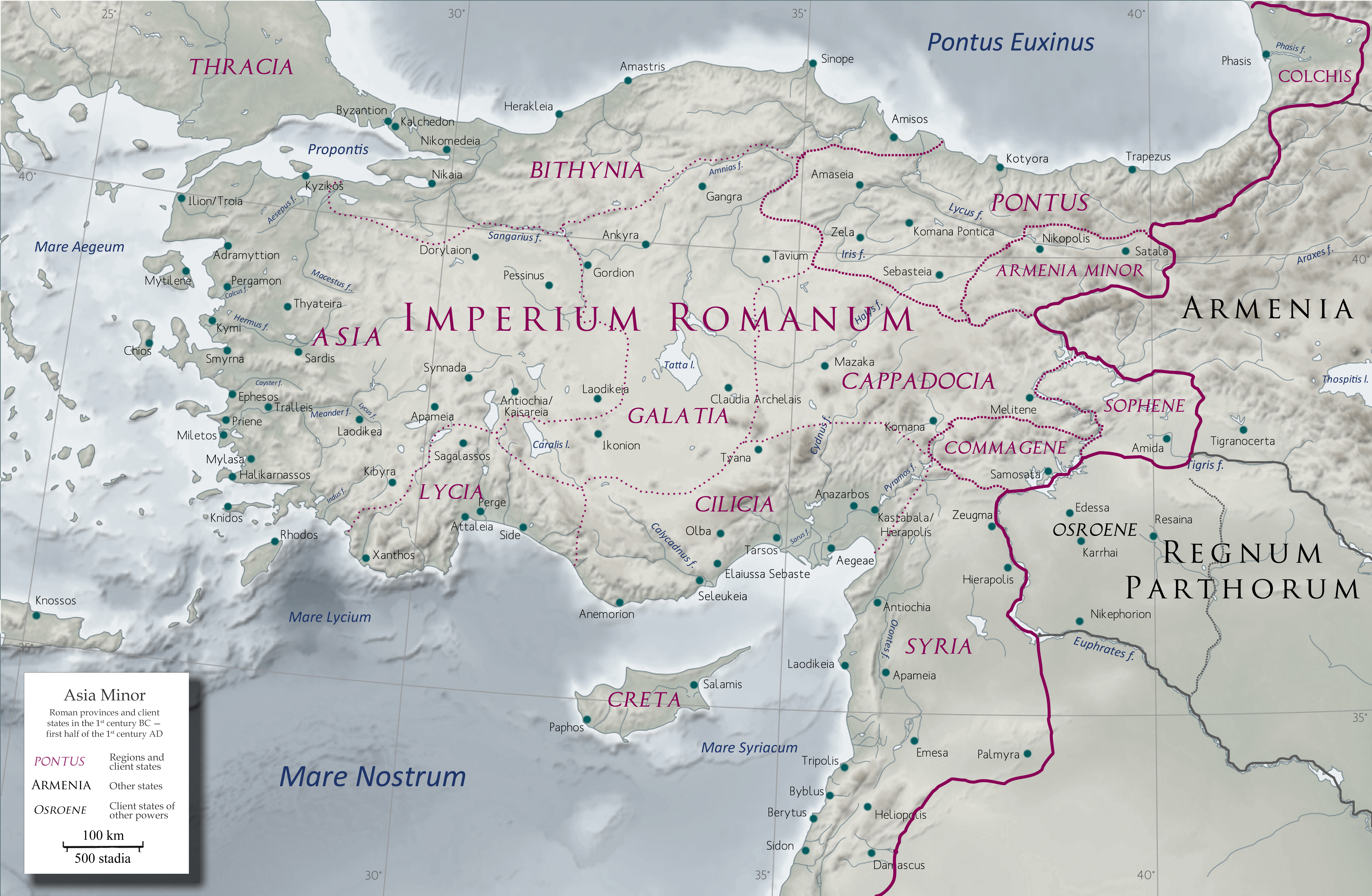
Anatolia in the early 1st century AD with Armenia Minor as a Roman client state

Lesser Armenia corresponded to the location of the Late Bronze Age Hayasa-Azzi confederation, which is thought by some scholars to be the source of the Armenian endonym hay and the original state of the Proto-Armenians. It has been suggested that the epithet "lesser" indicates that this territory was the older homeland of the Armenian people, while "greater" Armenia referred to a territory that was later settled.

Lesser Armenia may have formed a part of the territories of the Orontid dynasty, which ruled Armenia first as satraps of the Achaemenid Empire and then as kings. However, there is no clear evidence to support this claim. Lesser Armenia emerged as an independent kingdom after the Treaty of Apamea in 188 BC, although the exact origin, size and history of this kingdom are murky. The capital of this kingdom is not known, but it may have originally been located at Ani-Kamakh or Kamisa before moving to Nicopolis in the early Roman period.

== History ==
=== Independence Period ===
In 330 BC, Lesser Armenia (Lesser Armenia/Armenia Minor), along with several other small states in Asia Minor, proclaimed its independence. The Hellenistic period had begun in the Near East, and the newly formed states largely followed Ancient Greek culture. Initially, the kingdom encompassed the upper regions of the Euphrates, the upper and middle reaches of the Chorokh and Gayl (Lycus) rivers, and the upper reaches of the Halys river, situated between Greater Armenia, Cappadocia, and Pontus. It formed part of the ancient land of Hayasa. Lesser Armenia subjugated the Chalybes and Tibareni, extending its territory northward to the Black Sea. In 322 BC, Neoptolemus attempted to annex Lesser Armenia into the Greco-Macedonian Empire. Following the Battle of Ipsus in 301 BC, Lesser Armenia revolted and gained independence. This status lasted for two centuries. The capital of the state was Ani-Kamakh, the primary site for the cult of Aramazd, the chief deity of the pagan Armenians. Prior to this, the settlement had served as the center of the Hayasa tribal union.

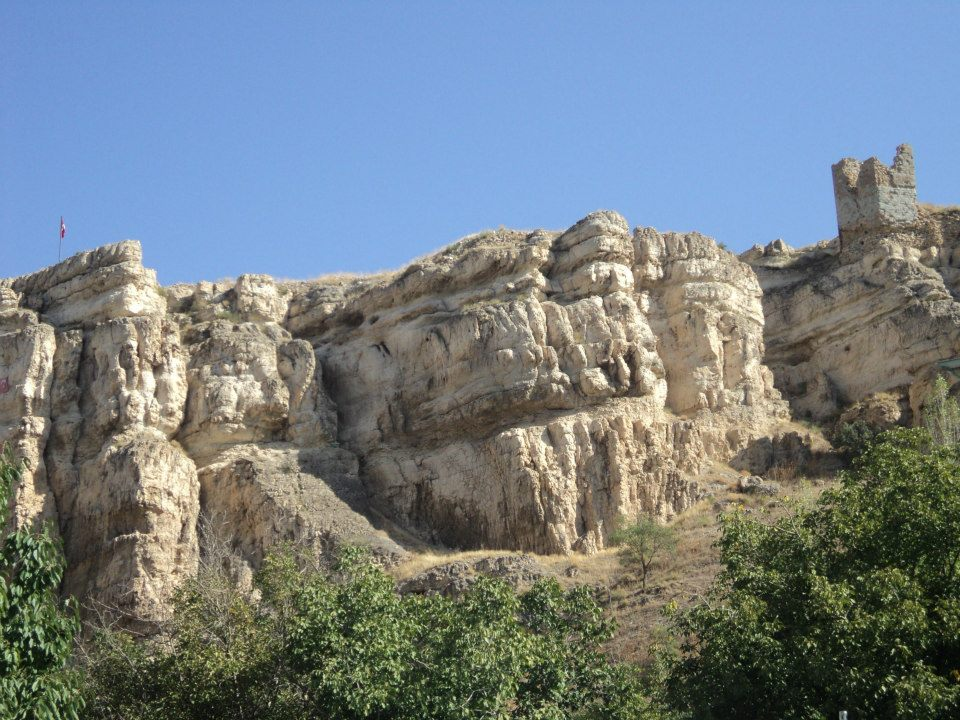
The ruins of the capital of Lesser Armenia, Ani-Kamakh, perched on a cliff

The territory of the Kingdom of Lesser Armenia was mountainous; it also included Karin and Derjan (later known as Upper Armenia). The lowland sections were primarily confined to the valleys of major rivers. The main occupation of the population was animal husbandry—specifically sheep farming and horse breeding. Later, when two other Armenian kingdoms—Commagene and the Kingdom of Sophene—separated from Greater Armenia, Lesser Armenia established active economic ties with them. This is explained by the mutually beneficial trade between these countries via the Euphrates River. Lesser Armenia was also connected to the newly formed Greek states of the Kingdom of Pontus and Cappadocia.

At the end of the 3rd century BC, the Seleucids attacked the Armenian Highlands, subjugating Greater Armenia, Lesser Armenia, Sophene, and Commagene. A separate satrapy was established in Lesser Armenia, and Mithridates—a nephew of the Seleucid king Antiochus III the Great and son of an Armenian nobleman—was appointed satrap. Ten years later, in 190 BC, the forces of Antiochus III were defeated by Rome at the Battle of Magnesia. Following this event, the satrap of Lesser Armenia restored its independence. Strabo noted that Lesser Armenia always had its own national princes or dynasties, which were often allied with Greater Armenia but frequently acted independently of it.

==== 331–112 BC ====
It is known that Lesser Armenia is first mentioned in connection with the Battle of Gaugamela. According to Quintus Curtius Rufus, the troops of Lesser Armenia were positioned in the center of the Achaemenid army, while those of Greater Armenia were in the first row of the army's right wing.

Behind them followed the Armenians from so-called Lesser Armenia; the Armenians were followed by the Babylonians, and behind them and others were the Belitae—inhabitants of the Cossaean mountains... On the right wing stood the Armenians of Greater Armenia, the Cadusians and Cappadocians, the Syrians and Medes; they also had scythed chariots.

Another chronicler testifying about the Battle of Gaugamela, Arrianus Flavius, also mentions the names of the leaders of the Armenian army:

The Armenians were led by Orontes and Mithraustes, and the Cappadocians by Ariaces... In the front of the right wing were deployed the Armenian and Cappadocian cavalries and fifty scythed chariots

Some time after the Battle of Gaugamela, upon entering Babylon, Alexander the Great considered that he had already achieved success and made a series of appointments. Among these, he appointed Mithrenes (Mihran), the Persian who had treacherously surrendered the fortress of Sardis to him, as the governor of Armenia. However, judging by the facts, the Armenians did not even allow him to set foot in Armenia.

The next clash between Macedonian and Armenian forces took place 2–3 years later when one of Alexander’s armies, led by General Menon, was sent to capture the gold-mining region of Upper Armenia, which bordered Lesser Armenia. As the Greek geographer Strabo testifies, the Armenians destroyed his army and executed the general. After this, Alexander made no further attempts to send troops into Armenia. Following the independence of Lesser Armenia in 331 BC, no further information about Mithraustes has been preserved in primary sources. It is unknown how many years Mithraustes ruled, nor is it known who immediately succeeded him.

After the death of Alexander the Great, wars lasting more than two decades began among his generals (known as the wars of the Diadochi or "Successors"), which ended in 301 BC with the partitioning of Alexander’s empire. The first division of his realm took place in the year of his death, 323 BC, during the Partition of Babylon. Although it was decided to maintain the integrity of the empire with Perdiccas becoming the general regent, the actual administration of the countries passed to Alexander’s generals, who sometimes opposed Perdiccas. In the list of countries divided among the generals in 323 BC, Armenia is not mentioned, which signifies that it was fully independent. Perdiccas, having become the regent of the Macedonian Empire, decided to annex the territories of Asia Minor that Alexander had not managed to conquer. The first target was Cappadocia. Perdiccas personally led the invasion in 322 BC and, after defeating King Ariarathes, executed him. The prince of Cappadocia found refuge in Armenia, and after some time, with the help of Armenian troops, was restored to his paternal throne. Diodorus Siculus provides detailed information regarding these events:

Ariarathes was the supreme commander of the country. Neoptolemus (against whom Lesser Armenia had revolted) treacherously went over to Craterus's side but was killed by Eumenes during the battle. Some time later, Perdiccas was also killed. Most of his associates were sentenced to death, including Eumenes (the latter fled and was killed later in 315 BC). Having lost the battle, he fell, after which both Cappadocia and its neighboring countries came under Macedonian rule. But Ariarathes, the son of the previous king, despairing of the situation, took refuge in Armenia with a few others. Not much later, when Eumenes, Perdiccas, and their associates were already dead, and Antigonus and Seleucus were occupied with other matters, Ariarathes, having received troops from Ardoates, the King of the Armenians, killed the Macedonian general Amyntas, immediately expelled the Macedonians from the country, and reconquered his ancestral dominion.

In the spring of 321 BC, the First War of the Diadochi broke out, during which a coalition was formed against Perdiccas by Ptolemy (established in Egypt) and Craterus and Antipater, who ruled over the European parts of the Macedonian Empire. At that time, Perdiccas appointed Eumenes as the commander-in-chief of the troops located in Lesser Armenia and Cappadocia.

Neoptolemus (against whom Lesser Armenia had revolted) treacherously defected to Craterus's side but was killed by Eumenes during the battle. Shortly thereafter, Perdiccas was also killed; most of his supporters were sentenced to death, including Eumenes (who fled and was later killed).

In 321 BC, the second division of Alexander's empire took place at Triparadisus. Here, too, no Armenian state is mentioned. Nicanor became the satrap of Cappadocia. Although precise information about Lesser Armenia has not been preserved, the fact that this Armenian region had revolted against the Macedonian generals in 321 BC—defeating and destroying them—and its absence from the list of countries subject to the Macedonian Empire during the same period, allows for the conclusion that Lesser Armenia had restored its independence. In other words, after gaining independence in 331 BC, Lesser Armenia was subject to Macedonian conquest for a short period (322–321 BC) before becoming independent again. It is not excluded that the restoration of Lesser Armenia's independence occurred with the support of Greater Armenia, which had given refuge to the deposed prince of Cappadocia and years later aided him with troops to reclaim his paternal throne.

The Wars of the Diadochi concluded in 301 BC with the disintegration of Alexander's world empire. The realm was finally divided into several parts, the largest of which was the Seleucid Empire, bordering Armenia.

In the "Roman History" of Appian of Alexandria, it is noted that the founder of that empire, Seleucus I Nicator, "held Mesopotamia, Armenia, and Cappadocia (which they call Seleucid), Persia, Parthia, and Bactria, the Arabian lands, Tapuria, Sogdiana, Arachosia, Hyrcania, and all other adjacent lands as far as the river Indus, which Alexander had conquered by force of arms." Subsequently, presenting the numerous cities founded by Seleucus Nicator, Appian writes:

In honor of his (Seleucus's) victories, Nicephorium was founded in Mesopotamia and Nicopolis in Armenia, in the place which is closest to Cappadocia.

From this, it becomes clear that the "Armenia" mentioned alongside Cappadocia is not Greater Armenia but Lesser Armenia, as Appian of Alexandria, in a subsequent section of the same work (Book XII, "The Mithridatic Wars"), mentions the location of the construction of the city of Nicopolis as Lesser Armenia. However, he attributes the city's founding to Pompey, who built it to commemorate his victory over Mithridates Eupator.

Between 301 BC and 183 BC, only one inscription concerning Lesser Armenia has been preserved. This is a bilingual (Greek and Aramaic) inscription found at the ancient site of Aghja-kale (Aghachakale) in Lesser Armenia, which contains extremely important information.

The Aramaic section of the inscription states:

Inside these walls was founded the tomb of Oromanes, son of Ariaukas. As a lasting memory, it was built by Ari[aukas], son of Oromanes, the satrap of Armenia.

The inscription testifies that Ariakes (Ariaukas) ruled in Lesser Armenia; it has been suggested that he be identified with the Ariakes who commanded the Cappadocian cavalry fighting alongside the army of Greater Armenia at the Battle of Gaugamela․ Without excluding the possibility of such an identification, which requires additional substantiation, it can be assumed that this may simply be a coincidental overlap of names.

Ariakes (Ariakes I) was succeeded by his son Oromanes (Oromana, perhaps Aramanyak). Oromanes-Aramanyak, in turn, was succeeded by his son, Ariakes II, who is the author of the aforementioned bilingual inscription.

The next piece of information preserved in primary sources regarding Lesser Armenia concerns the year 183 BC. King Pharnaces of Pontus and the "satrap" of Lesser Armenia, Mithridates, allied and invaded Galatia and Cappadocia, but were defeated and forced to sign a peace treaty on unfavorable terms.

It has been suggested that at the beginning of the 2nd century BC, Lesser Armenia became subject to the Pontic Kingdom.

Regarding this, H. Manandyan writes:

As we see in Polybius, this Mithridates of Lesser Armenia is called a satrap, that is, a governor. From this testimony, it can perhaps be inferred that during the war of 180 BC, Mithridates was not an independent king, but was likely subject to the supreme authority of Pontus or perhaps another neighboring king.

From Strabo's information, it becomes clear that in the years preceding 112 BC—until Mithridates VI Eupator came to power—the kings of Lesser Armenia were Sysis and his son Antipater. Between 133–129 BC, the king of Lesser Armenia was Mithridates Euergetes, who is Mithridates V of Pontus (150–120 BC), the father of Mithridates VI Eupator.

At the end of the 2nd century BC, King Antipater of Lesser Armenia adopted Mithridates, who had fled from Pontus. Being childless, the Armenian king—descended from the Orontid (Yervanduni) dynasty—bequeathed his kingdom to him. In 115 BC, Mithridates was crowned King of Lesser Armenia, and two years later, King of all Pontus.

=== Foreign Rule ===
==== During the Period of Pontic Dominance ====
After the conspiratorial assassination of Mithridates V, Mithridates Eupator, who was 11 years old at the time, inherited the kingdom along with his mother, Queen Laodice VI, and his younger brother, Chrestus. Since the children were still minors, the Queen assumed the regency of the country. However, this posed a great danger to Mithridates, as his mother wished to see her younger son on the throne. Consequently, Mithridates left the country and returned only years later to establish himself on his paternal throne.

Judging by the facts, King Antipater of Lesser Armenia first gave refuge to the Pontic prince and later, likely being childless and valuing Mithridates' qualities, adopted him, thereby bequeathing him his kingdom. This may be evidenced by the fact that Mithridates VI Eupator is mentioned as "King of Pontus and the Armenians." King Antipater bequeathed Lesser Armenia as an inheritance to Mithridates Eupator around 112 BC. The fact that he is remembered in primary sources as the "King of Pontus and the Armenians" allows us to view Mithridates Eupator also as the King of Lesser Armenia, likely under the regnal title or throne name "Artaxias."

Cases are known in the Pontic Kingdom where the king appointed royal princes as supreme governors in conquered lands. It has been suggested that a similar situation might have existed in Lesser Armenia, where in the 80s BC, Arcathius, one of the eldest sons of Mithridates Eupator, might have been proclaimed king.

Throughout his reign, the King of Pontus utilized the military forces of Lesser Armenia. The 10,000-strong cavalry of Lesser Armenia played a decisive role in Mithridates Eupator's army and participated in his campaigns. Mithridates entrusted the defense of cities located on the outskirts of his state to Armenian soldiers from Lesser Armenia. This is evidenced by inscriptions found in Olbia and Chersonesos.

After being defeated by the Roman army of Lucullus in 71 BC, Mithridates VI Eupator was driven out of his domains (losing Lesser Armenia as well) and found refuge with Tigranes the Great. After crushing Lucullus at the Battle of Aradzani in September 68 BC, Tigranes the Great provided Mithridates Eupator with a 4,000-strong troop. Adding this to his own army of the same size, Mithridates liberated Pontus and Lesser Armenia from the Romans. Furthermore, building on this success, he invaded Bithynia, while Tigranes the Great captured Cappadocia.

Roman interests in the East were severely jeopardized, and to save the situation, Pompey was sent there with extraordinary powers. In 66 BC, the latter defeated Mithridates Eupator, who, this time failing to receive support from Tigranes the Great, departed for the Bosporan Kingdom, where he ended his life by suicide in 63 BC.

=== Roman and Byzantine Lesser Armenia ===
==== The Mithridatic Wars and Roman Client Kings ====
During the Third Mithridatic War (73–71 BC), the forces of the Roman Republic under General Lucullus occupied and devastated Pontus, including Lesser Armenia. In 68 BC, Mithridates VI briefly liberated the territory. Two years later, Rome dispatched Pompey the Great to the East. He decisively defeated Mithridates VI, the last independent king of Lesser Armenia, at the site of present-day Piurk. To commemorate this victory, Pompey founded the city of Nicopolis ("City of Victory").

From 64 BC until 72 AD, Lesser Armenia functioned as a Roman vassal (client) kingdom under various monarchs:

- Ariobarzanes I of Cappadocia (64–63 BC)
- Deiotarus of Galatia(63–47 BC and 44–42 BC)
- Ariobarzanes III of Cappadocia (47–44 BC)
- Castor (41–36 BC)
- Deiotarus II (36–33 BC)
- Polemon I of Pontus (33–30 BC)

During the reign of Artaxias II in Greater Armenia, Parthian influence grew, and Artavasdes I of Media Atropatene ruled Lesser Armenia (30–20 BC). This was countered by Emperor Augustus, who restored Roman borders and appointed new rulers (20 BC – 17 AD). During this era, the Romans annexed Megalopolis ("Great City"), renaming it Sebasteia in honor of Augustus (Sebaste being the Greek equivalent of Augustus).

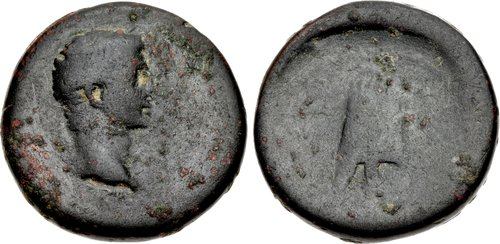
Coins of Zeno-Artaxias, Prince of Pontus and Lesser Armenia, later King of Greater Armenia

==== Integration and Provincial Reorganization ====
In 1 AD, the Artaxiad dynasty of Greater Armenia became extinct. For half a century, Rome and Parthia struggled for control. A notable ruler was Zeno (18–34 AD), son of Polemon of Pontus and Lesser Armenia, whom the people called "Artaxias III." Later, Cotys IX (37–43 AD) ruled both Greater and Lesser Armenia simultaneously.

The struggle culminated in the Roman–Parthian War of 54–64. While Tiridates I (of the Arshakuni branch) was recognized as King of Greater Armenia, the Roman Emperor Vespasian finally abolished the client kingdom of Lesser Armenia in 72 AD, annexing it into the province of Cappadocia.

In 114 AD, Emperor Trajan briefly incorporated all of Armenia as a Roman province, adding districts such as Melitene and Cataonia to Lesser Armenia. Lesser Armenia at this time consisted of five northern districts: Orbalisene, Aetulane, Aeretice, Orsene, and Orbesine.

==== Late Antiquity and Christianization ====
Lesser Armenia was briefly reunited with Greater Armenia under Tiridates III in 287 AD, until the Sassanid conquest by Shapur II in 337 AD. Under Diocletian, it was organized as a regular province and eventually divided into two:

- Armenia Prima (First Armenia): Included most of the original Lesser Armenia (Capital: Sebasteia).
- Armenia Secunda (Second Armenia): Included the southern tracts and Melitene (Capital: Melitene).

By the 4th century, the Armenian population began serving in the Roman army in large numbers, forming the Legio I Armeniaca and Legio II Armeniaca. Christianity also took deep root; the Orthodox Church venerates the 40 Martyrs of Sebasteia and the 45 Martyrs of Nicopolis for their sacrifice during the persecutions. Following the councils of Nicaea (325) and Constantinople (381), Christianity became the official religion. In 387 AD, the First Partition of Armenia occurred, resulting in four Armenian provinces within the Roman sphere.

==== Byzantine Era and Arab Conquest ====
In 395 AD, these administrative units passed to the Byzantine Empire. In 536 AD, Emperor Justinian I reorganized the administration, renaming First and Second Armenia to Second and Third respectively.

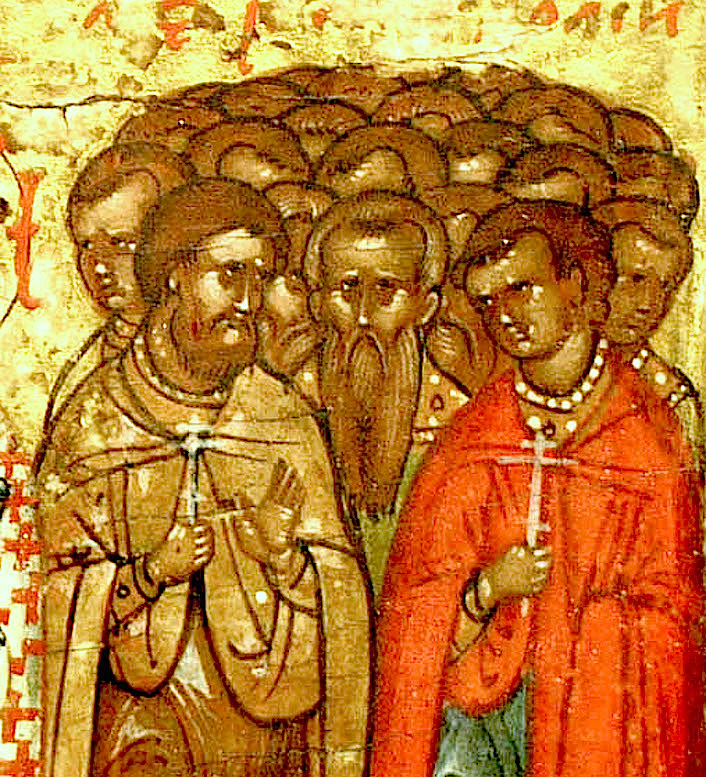
Russian icon dedicated to the 45 Armenian Martyrs of Nicopolis

Major episcopal sees in these provinces included:

- Armenia I: Nicopolis, Satala, Sebasteia, Sebastopolis.
- Armenia II: Melitene, Arabissus, Arka, Ariarathia, Comana, Cucusus.
- Armenia III: Erzincan, Kamakh, Theodosiopolis (Karin).

In the 7th century, while Greater Armenia fell under the Arab Caliphate, the remaining Byzantine-controlled parts of Lesser Armenia were incorporated into the theme of Armeniakon.

During the 8th century, fleeing Arab persecutions, princes Hamam and Shapuh Amantuni led 12,000 migrants from Artaz to the Byzantine Chaldia theme (789–790 AD). Hamam founded the town of Hamamshen (Hemşin), giving birth to a semi-independent principality. Later, as Byzantium annexed the Bagratid Kingdom of Armenia, they resettled thousands of Armenians in Lesser Armenia, including Senekerim-Hovhannes Artsruni of Vaspurakan in Sebasteia and Gagik II in Caesarea.

==== Turkish Rule ====
From the second half of the 11th century, Lesser Armenia was seized by the Seljuk-Turkic conquerors, and from the first half of the 15th century, by the Ottoman Empire. Beginning in the 19th century, the inhabitants of Lesser Armenia were referred to as "Western Armenians"; this became particularly prominent after the Russo-Persian wars, when Eastern Armenia was annexed to the Russian Empire.

At the beginning of the 20th century, the number of Armenians in Lesser Armenia (the Sivas and Trebizond vilayets) was more than 350,000, while the number of Greeks and Greek-speaking inhabitants was around 400,000. In 1915, during the Armenian Genocide, Lesser Armenia was largely depopulated of its Armenian inhabitants.

== Episcopal sees ==
Ancient episcopal sees of the Roman province of Armenia Prima (I) listed in the Annuario Pontificio as titular sees:

- Berissa
- Colonia in Armenia (Köylühisar) (Armenian Catholic Church)
- Nicopolis in Armenia
- Pedachtoë (Bedochton, Pedachton)
- Satala in Armenia
- Sebastea (Sivas)
- Sebastopolis in Armenia (Sulusaray)

Ancient episcopal sees of the Roman province of Armenia Secunda (II) listed in the Annuario Pontificio as titular sees:

- Arabissus
- Arca in Armenia (Arga)
- Ariarathia (Aziziye)
- Comana Armeniae (Sar or Sarkale)
- Cucusus (Göksun)
- Melitene (Malatya)
- Verissa

For ancient episcopal sees of the Roman province of Armenia Tertia (III), see Roman Armenia#Episcopal sees.

== Later history ==
Lesser Armenia is traditionally considered as part of Western Armenia, especially after the acquisition of Eastern Armenia by the Russian Empire in the aftermath of the Russo-Persian War of 1826-1828.

The Christian Armenian population of Lesser Armenia continued its existence in the area until the Armenian genocide of 1915–23. Some Armenians still live in the area, albeit converted to Islam under Ottoman influence, mainly in the 17th century.

== List of rulers ==
- Mithraustes (Mihravisht / Mihrovisht) – 331–322 (?) BC
- Ariakes (Arioka) I – Final decades of the 4th century BC (possibly after 321 or 301 BC)
- Oromanes (Oromana, Aramanyak) – End of the 4th century BC / or first decades of the 3rd century BC
- Ariakes (Arioka) II – Mid-3rd century BC
- Mithridates – 180s–170s BC
- Sysis – (?) years
- Antipater – (?)–112 BC
- Mithridates VI Eupator (Artaxias) – 112–71 and 68–66 BC
- Brogitarus of Galatia – 64–52 BC
- Deiotarus of Galatia – 52–47 BC
- Ariobarzanes of Cappadocia – 47–44 BC
- Deiotarus of Galatia – 44–42 BC (second time)
- Polemon of Pontus – 34–30 BC
- Artavasdes of Atropatene – 30–20 BC
- Archelaus of Cappadocia – 20 BC – 17 AD
- Cotys of Thrace – 38–54 (?) AD
- Aristobulus of Chalcis – 54–72 AD

== See also ==
- Hemshinli
