= Cabassus =

Town of ancient Cataonia

Coordinates: 38°08′05″N 36°07′39″E

Cabassus or Kabassos (Ancient Greek: Καβασσός), or Cabessus or Kabessos (Καβησσός), or Kabissos, was a town of ancient Cataonia or Cappadocia between Tarsus and Mazaca. It was inhabited during Roman and Byzantine times.

Its site is tentatively located west of Cucusus near Doğanbeyli, Asiatic Turkey.
