= Bozgüney =

Bozgüney may refer to:

- Bozgüney, Adana, a town in Adana Province, Turkey
- Bozgüney, Lachin, a village in Lachin Rayon, Azerbaijan
