= Armenian Hexapolis =

The Hexapolis (Greek: Ἑξάπολις) was a district in Armenia Minor, mentioned in the early Byzantine period (7th–8th centuries). It comprised the cities of Melitene, which was the district capital, Arka, Arabissos, Kukusos, Komana and Ariaratheia. It formed part of the Roman province of Armenia Secunda, renamed to Armenia Tertia after Justinian I's provincial reorganization in 536.

The Hexapolis sustained several attacks from the Arabs beginning in 661. An emir called Busr attacked the area west of Militene in 667 while, in 695, the Arabs - disregarding all treaties - raided Hexapolis and took many of its inhabitants captive. Justinian was about to launch an expedition to Hexapolis to counter the Arab attack but this was prevented after he was deposed by a mob led by Leontios, his previously appointed strategos of the Hellas Theme.

== Sources ==
- Tourneur, V. (1934). "L'Hexapolis arménienne au VIIe siècle et au VIIIe". Annuaire de l'Institut de Philologie et d'Histoire Orientales (in French). 2: 947–952.
