= Siricae =

Town of ancient Cappadocia

Coordinates: 38°12′15″N 36°27′32″E

Siricae, also known as Siricis, and possibly as Saricha, was a town of ancient Cappadocia on the road from Comana to Melitene, 24 miles northwest of the first.

Its site is located near Keklikoluk, Asiatic Turkey.
