= Tozlu =

Tozlu may refer to:

- Tozlu, Tufanbeyli, a village in Adana Province, Turkey
- Eren Tozlu, Turkish footballer
- Tozlu, Iran, a village in Zanjan Province, Iran
