= Andabalis =

Village in Turkey

Coordinates: 38°02′22″N 34°40′25″E

Andabalis was a town of ancient Cataonia or of southern Cappadocia located northeast of Tyana. It was inhabited during Roman and Byzantine times.

Its site is located near Eski Andaval, Asiatic Turkey, or Niğde : ruin of "Andaval Kilisesi", "Church of Andaval", on Google Maps.
