= Pınarbaşı, Kayseri =

Pınarbaşı
- District and municipality
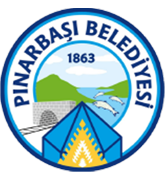
- Logo

- Map of Pınarbaşı in Kayseri

- Location within Turkey Location within Turkey Central Anatolia
- Coordinates: 38°43′19″N 36°23′28″E
- Country: Turkey
- Province: Kayseri
- Established: 1863

Government
  - Mayor: Deniz Yağan (CHP)
  - Kaymakam: Salih Ağar
- Area: 3,418 km^{2} (1,320 sq mi)
- Population (2022): 21,240
  - Density: 6.214/km^{2} (16.09/sq mi)
- Time zone: UTC+3 (TRT)
- Area code: 0352

Pınarbaşı (Adyghe: Iазэй/Пынарбащы, Armenian: Ազիզիե) previously known as Aziziye is a municipality and district of Kayseri Province, Turkey. It was first established in 1863 by the Ottoman Sultan Abdülaziz. In 1863, Lozade Mahmut Efendi was appointed as the first mayor of Pınarbaşı. Its area is 3,418 km^{2}, and its population is 21,240 (2022).

== History ==
Ariarateia (Greek: Ἀριαράθεια; Roman: Ariarátheia) or Ariarátia (present-day Pınarbaşı in Kayseri, Turkey) was a Cappadocian city founded by Ariarate IV (r. 220–163 BC), in the region at the time known as Sargarausena. It was incorporated into the Roman Empire upon the annexation of Cappadocia as a province by Emperor Tiberius.

In the 4th century, more precisely during the reign of Constantine (r. 306–337), the eastern portion of Cappadocia was separated to form Lesser Armenia. In the middle of the same century, Armenia Minor was divided into Armenia Prima and Armenia Secunda, Ariarateia being incorporated into the latter. In 431, Ariarateia is documented as a suffragan diocese. During the Byzantine Empire, it was renamed Dasmenda.

Near the neighbourhood of Melikgazi are the ruins of Tzamandos, a Byzantine border fortress town built by the famous Armenian general Melias around the year 909/910.

In 1065, the town was given among other lands in the region to the last Bagratuni King Gagik II as exchange for him renouncing the Kingdom of Armenia.

Pınarbaşı, originally founded by Sultan Abdülaziz in 1863 under the name Aziziye, was later renamed during the Republican period to its current name, Pınarbaşı. It has preserved much of its cultural heritage, including Ottoman-era mosques, madrasahs, and wooden houses. Notable landmarks include the Old Bath (Turkish: Eski Hamam), a 19th-century Ottoman bath, Barbaros Elementary School, now the Pınarbaşı National Education Directorate, founded in 1910, and Aziziye Mosque. The town also features Greek-style wooden mansions, such as Aşhotlar Mansion, which were later used by Turks following the population exchange.

== Demographics ==
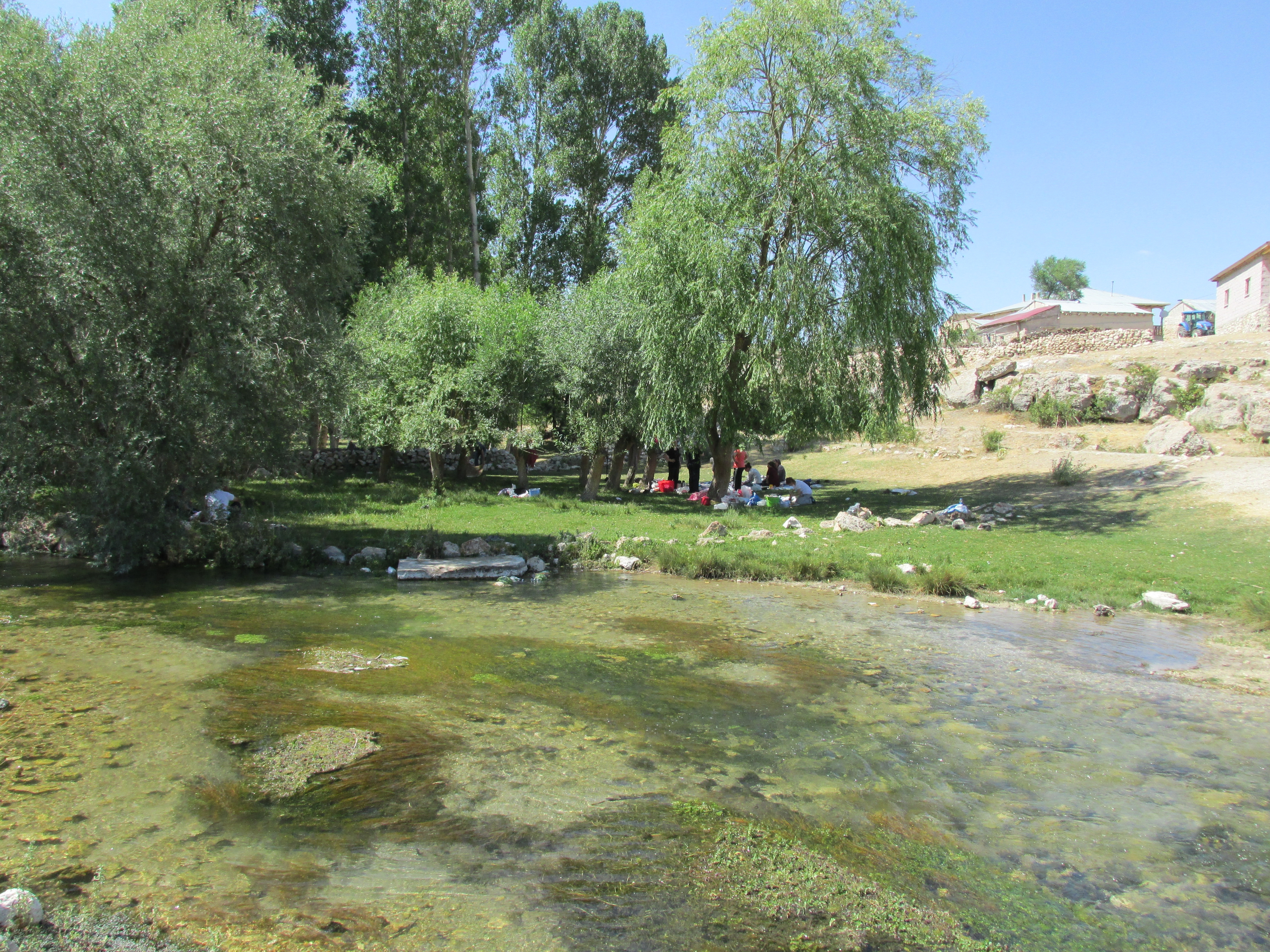
A view from Şerefiye Village in Pınarbaşı.

Pınarbaşı is home to a diverse population with a rich ethnic composition. The community includes Circassians, Afshars and Alevi Kurds, as well as Turks from nearby communities such as Gürün, Darende and Afşin, alongside Turkish refugees, including Muhacirs who fled Kars during the 1877–1878 Russo-Turkish War and Turkish migrants from Bulgaria who arrived during the population exchange between Greece and Turkey. A large portion of the population is made up of Circassians who settled this area by the Ottomans after their migration to Turkey as a result of Circassian genocide.

The local archives were burned down around 1923. Two versions exist: according to one, Armenian genocide survivors burned the records to hide their non-Muslim origin; according to another, Muslims who took over properties left by massacred Armenians destroyed the records of the original proprietors.

== Composition ==
There are 122 neighbourhoods in Pınarbaşı District:

- Akören
- Akpınar
- Alagazili
- Alamescit
- Altıkesek
- Arslanbeyli
- Artmak
- Aşağıbeyçayırı
- Aşağıborandere
- Aşağıkaragöz
- Aşağıkızılçevlik
- Avşarpotuklu
- Aygörmez
- Bahçecik
- Beserek
- Büyükgümüşgün
- Büyükgürleyen
- Büyükkabaktepe
- Büyükkaramanlı
- Büyükkaramuklu
- Büyükkömarmut
- Büyükpotuklu
- Cabe
- Çakılkaya
- Çaybaşı
- Cinahmet
- Cinliören
- Çördüklü
- Çukuryurt
- Demircili
- Demirciören
- Devederesi
- Dikilitaş
- Dilciler
- Eğrisöğüt
- Elmalı
- Emeğil
- Esenköy
- Eskitekke
- Eskiyassıpınar
- Fakıekinciliği
- Gebelek
- Gölcük
- Gültepe
- Güney
- Halitbeyören
- Hanköy
- Hasırcı
- Hassa
- Hayriye
- Hilmiye
- Hürriyet
- İğdelipayaslı
- İnliören
- İnönü
- Kadılı
- Kaftangiyen
- Kaman
- Karaboğaz
- Karahacılı
- Karahalka
- Karakuyu
- Kavakköy
- Kavlaklar
- Kayaaltı
- Kayabaşı
- Kayaönü
- Kaynar
- Kazancık
- Kerimoğlu
- Kılıçkışla
- Kılıçmehmet
- Kırkgeçit
- Kırkpınar
- Kızıldere
- Kızılhan
- Kızılören
- Köşkerli
- Küçükgümüşgün
- Küçükkömarmut
- Küçükpotuklu
- Kurbağalık
- Kurttepe
- Kuşçular
- Malakköy
- Melikgazi
- Methiye
- Olukkaya
- Örenşehir
- Oruçoğlu
- Panlı
- Paşalı
- Pazarören
- Pazarsu
- Pulpınar
- Şabanlı
- Saçayağı
- Saçlı
- Şerefiye
- Serinyurt
- Söğütlü
- Solaklar
- Tahtaköprü
- Taşlıgeçit
- Taşlıoğlu
- Taşoluk
- Tersakan
- Tözgün
- Üçpınar
- Uzunpınar
- Uzunyol
- Yağlıpınar
- Yahyabey
- Yarımtepe
- Yenicami
- Yeniocak
- Yeregeçen
- Yukarıbeyçayırı
- Yukarıborandere
- Yukarıkaragöz
- Yukarıkızılçevlik
- Yusuflar

== Notable people ==
- Gökay Akbulut (born 1982), Turkish-German politician; member of the Bundestag for Baden-Württemberg
- Dursun Ataş (born 1966), member of the Grand National Assembly of Turkey
- İsmail Hakkı Berkok (1890–1954) Turkish general, historian and deputy of the Grand National Assembly
- Mehmet Kemal Dedeman (1903–1998), Turkish businessman and founder of the Dedeman Group
- Elif Eralp (born 1981), German politician serving as the leader of Die Linke in the House of Representatives of Berlin
- Mualla Eyüboğlu (1919–2009), Turkish architect, known for her restoration work on the Topkapı Palace harem room and the Rumelihisarı
- Abdullah Kızılırmak (1925–1983), Turkish astronomer and professor
- Sadık Yakut (born 1956), former politician and Deputy Speaker of the Grand National Assembly
- Muzaffer Özdağ (born 1933–2002), former staff captain in the Turkish Armed Forces and politician
- Ayyüce Türkeş Taş (born 1977), member of the Grand National Assembly of Turkey
- Alparslan Türkeş (1917–1997), Turkish politician and founder of the Nationalist Movement Party
- Kutalmış Türkeş (born 1978), former member of the Grand National Assembly of Turkey
- Tuğrul Türkeş (born 1954), Turkish politician and former Deputy Prime Minister of Turkey
- Bülent Yıldırım (born 1972), UEFA-accredited Süper Lig referee
- Ali İhsan Varol (born 1976), Turkish TV show presenter, producer and actor
- Abidin Ünal (born 1951), former commander of the Turkish Air Force and senior member of the NATO STARNET

== See also ==
- Kayseri Pınarbaşı District Governorship
- Kayseri Pınarbaşı Municipality
