= Men (deity) =

Lunar god worshipped in Anatolia

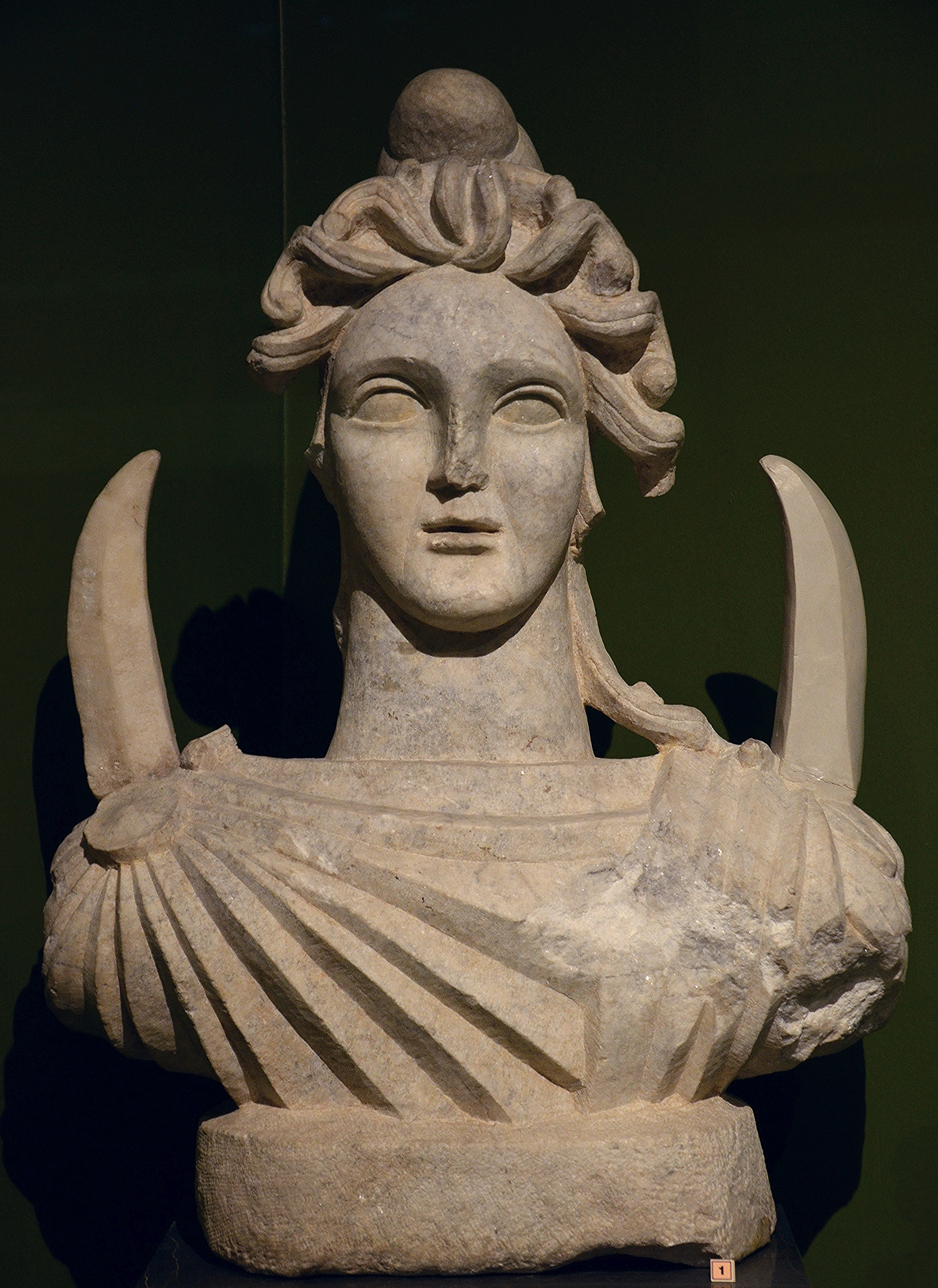
Bust of Mēn. (Museum of Anatolian Civilizations)

Mēn (Greek: Μήν "month; Moon") was a lunar god worshipped in the western interior parts of Anatolia. He is attested in various localized variants, such as Mēn Askaenos in Antioch in Pisidia, or Mēn Pharnakou at Ameria in Pontus.

Mēn was probably a Phrygian deity, associated with the local descendant of the Hitto-Luwian moon god Arma, and is often found in association with Persianate elements, especially with the goddess Anahita. Lunar symbolism dominates his iconography. The god is usually shown with the horns of a crescent emerging from behind his shoulders, and he is described as the god presiding over the (lunar) months. Strabo describes Mēn as a local god of the Phrygians. Mēn may also be influenced by the Zoroastrian lunar divinity Mah.

== Mēn Pharnakou ==
In the Kingdom of Pontus, there was a temple estate dedicated to Mēn Pharnakou and Selene at Ameria, near Cabira (Strabo 12.3.31). The temple was probably established by Pharnakes I in the 2nd century BC, apparently in an attempt to counterbalance the influence of the Moon goddess Ma of Comana. The cult of Mēn Pharnakou in Pontus has been traced to the appearance of the star and crescent motif on Pontic coins at the time.

== Mēn Askaenos ==
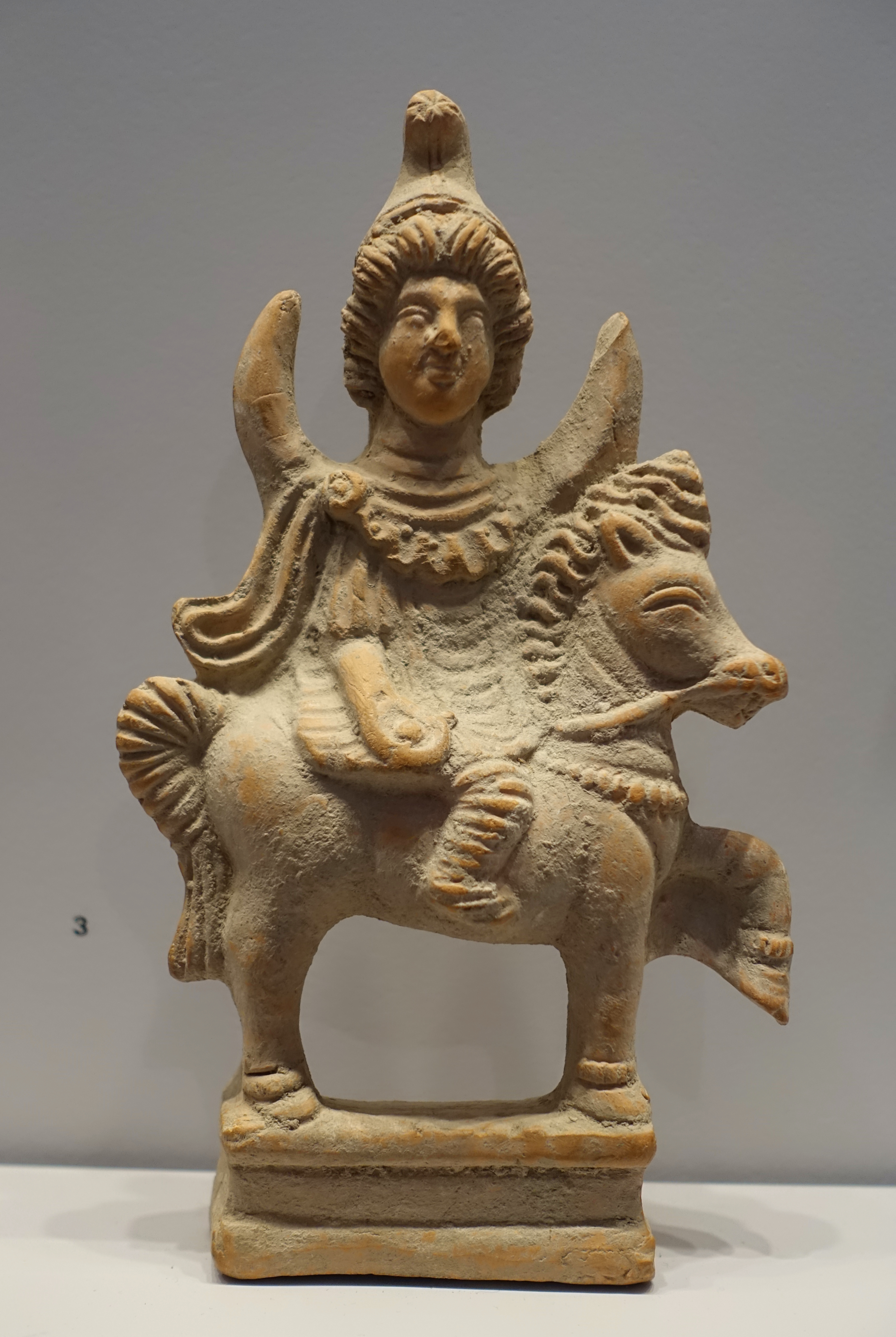
Mounted Mēn wearing a Phryian cap (Roman era, 3rd century AD)

A similar temple estate dedicated to Mēn Askaenos existed in Pisidia, first centered around Anabura and then shifted to the nearby city of Pisidian Antioch after its founding by the Seleucids around 280 BC. The temple estate/sacred sanctuary (ἱερόs) was a theocratic monarchy ruled by the "Priest of Priests," a hereditary title. According to Strabo, this "temple state" that the cult of Mên Askaenos controlled near Pisidian Antioch, persisted until the city was refounded by the Romans in 25 BC, becoming Colonia Caesarea Augusta. The colony was primarily settled by veterans from Legio V Alaudae and Legio VII Gemina.

Taşlıalan (1988) in a study of Antioch in Pisidia has remarked that the people who settled on the acropolis in the Greek colonial era carried the Mēn Askaenos cult down to the plain as Patrios Theos and in the place where the Augusteum was built, there are some signs of this former cult as bucrania on the rock-cut walls.

== Roman reception ==
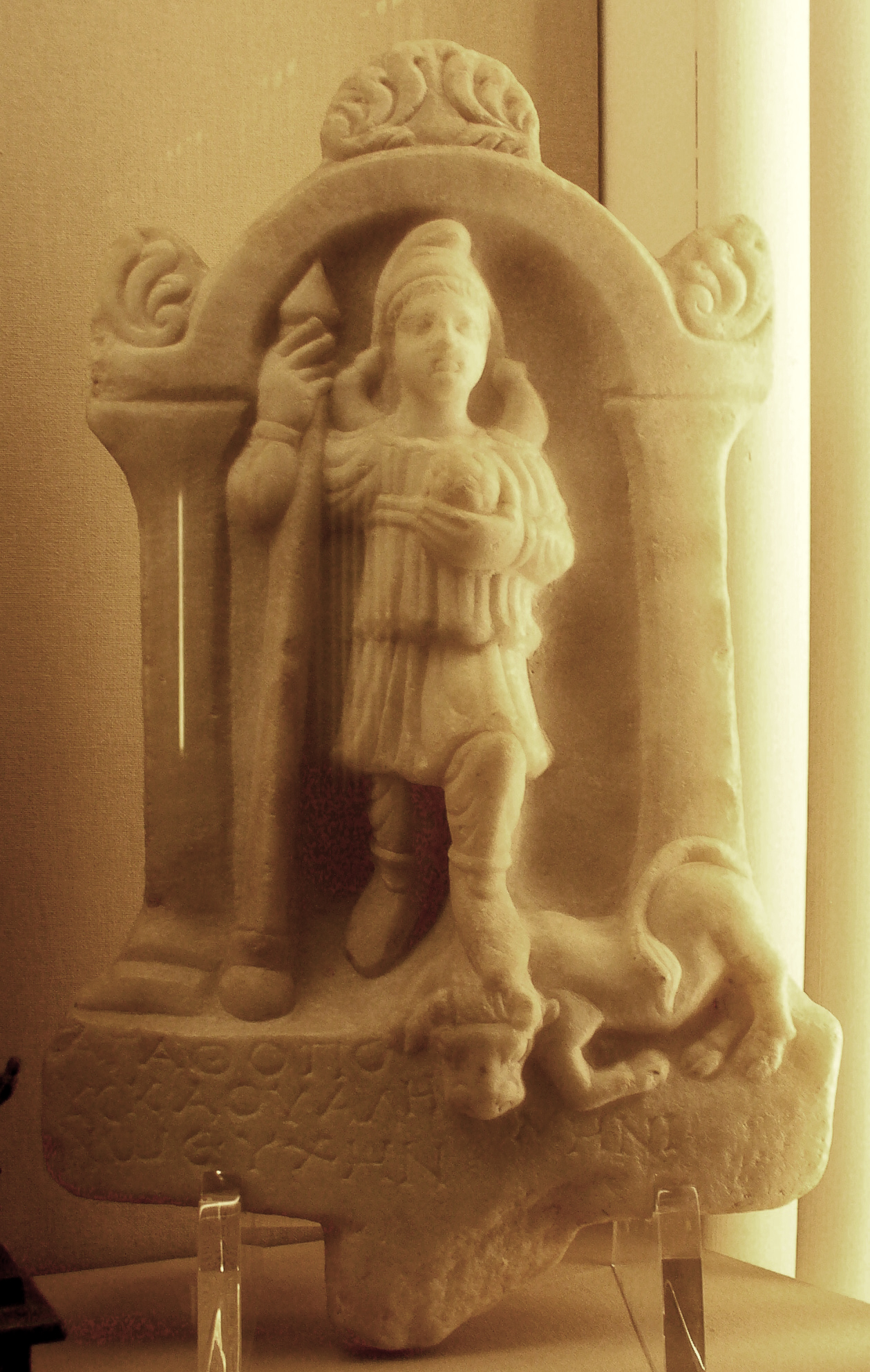
Roman relief of Mēn wearing a Phrygian cap (2nd century, British Museum)

Autochthonous Mēn as attested in Anatolia is to be distinguished from his reception as a "Phrygian god" in Rome during the imperial period. Here, Mēn is depicted with a Phrygian cap and a belted tunic. He may be accompanied by bulls and lions in religious artwork. The Roman iconography of Mēn partly recalls that of Mithras, who also wears a Phrygian cap and is commonly depicted with a bull and symbols of the Sun and Moon.

The Augustan History has the Roman emperor Caracalla (r. 198–217) venerate Lunus at Carrhae; this, i.e. a masculine variant of Luna, "Moon", has been taken as a Latinized name for Mēn. The same source records the local opinion that anyone who believes the deity of the Moon to be feminine shall always be subject to women, whereas a man who believes that he is masculine will dominate his wife. David Magie suggests that Caracalla had actually visited the temple of Sin, the Mesopotamian Moon god.

In later times, Mēn may also have been identified with both Attis of Phrygia and Sabazius of Thrace.

== See also ==
- Minos
- Mah
- Ma (goddess)
- Máni
- Min (god)
- Mithraism
- List of lunar deities
