= Ariarathia =

Town of ancient Cappadocia

Coordinates: 38°43′19″N 36°23′28″E

Ariarathia or Ariaratheia (Ancient Greek: Ἀριαράθεια) was a town of ancient Cappadocia, in the Sargarausene region, inhabited during Hellenistic, Roman, and Byzantine times.

== History ==
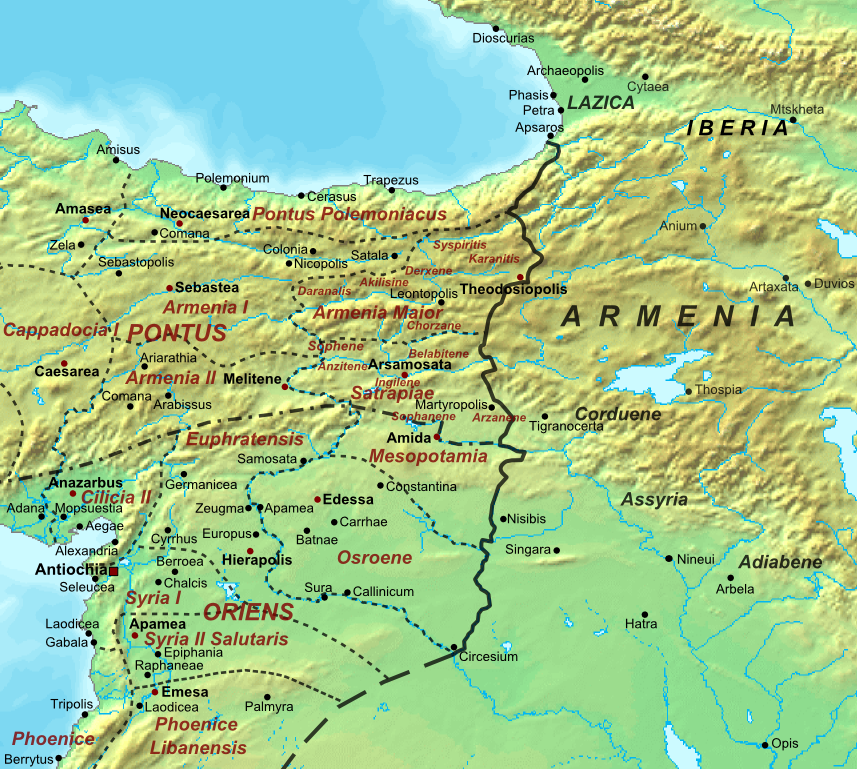
Ariarathia in the 5th century

It was founded by Ariarathes IV of Cappadocia (r. 220–163 BCE). It was detached from Cappadocia and assigned to the province of Armenia Minor when that province was established. The town had city rights. The town belonged to the so-called Armenian Hexapolis and remained under Byzantine control in the seventh century. In lack of archaeological findings, it seems that the city vanished during the eighth or ninth century when the Muslim onslaught rendered the area between Caeserea and Melitene a no man's land.

Its site is located near Pınarbaşı, Asiatic Turkey. While Ramsay identified it with the town of Tzamandos, this is incorrect as Tzamandos is 15 km west of Ariarathia.

== Diocese ==
It became the seat of a bishop and a certain Acacius of Ariarathia is known to have defended the view of Cyril against Theodoret and the eastern Bishops in the time of the Council of Ephesus, 449. A No longer a residential bishopric, it remains a titular see of the Roman Catholic Church.

== See also ==
- Ariaramneia

== Sources ==
- Cooper, Eric; Decker, Michael J. (24 July 2012). Life and Society in Byzantine Cappadocia. Springer. pp. 17, 25–28, 43. ISBN 978-1-137-02964-5.
