= Tufanbeyli =

- District and municipality
- Map showing Tufanbeyli District in Adana Province

- Location within Turkey
- Coordinates: 38°15′53″N 36°13′21″E
- Country: Turkey
- Province: Adana

Government
  - Mayor: Ahmet Aktürk (CHP)
- Area: 851 km^{2} (329 sq mi)
- Elevation: 1,450 m (4,760 ft)
- Population (2022): 16,400
  - Density: 19.3/km^{2} (49.9/sq mi)
- Time zone: UTC+3 (TRT)
- Postal code: 01640
- Area code: 0322
- Website: www.tufanbeyli.bel.tr

Tufanbeyli is municipality and district of Adana Province, Turkey. Its area is 851 km^{2}, and its population is 16,400 (2022). It is 196 km northeast of the city of Adana, on an uneven, sloping plateau high in the Tahtalı range of the Taurus Mountains. It has been bounded economically to Kayseri, 178 km far. Its neighbors are Sarız from North, Göksun from east, Saimbeyli from south, Develi from southwest, and Tomarza from west.

Tufanbeyli is reached by crossing one of three high mountain passes. It's a struggle to reach but the views are incredible. The river Göksu, a tributary of the Seyhan runs across the plateau. The climate is hot dry summers and cold winters. The mountains are forested but these are steadily being consumed by the local people.

== History ==
During the Bronze Age, the area was part of the kingdom of Kizzuwatna. In classical antiquity, the region of Tufanbeyli was in the southwestern corner of Cappadocia (while the parts of the Adana region south of Tufanbeyli were in Cilicia). The city of Comana was situated near Şarköy, some kilometers north of Tufanbeyli.

The area is now settled by descendants of Turks from the Caucasus and the Avşar (Afshar tribe; the former having come to Anatolia as a result of the Russian influx into the Caucasus in the 18th and 19th centuries. The latter being one of the group of Turkish migrants from Asia that have preserved their clan identity in Anatolia. The Avşar played a key role in the Turkish conquest of the Çukurova region and remained a local authority right up until the 19th century, especially in mountain strongholds like Tufanbeyli. Its former names were Höketçe before 1923 and Mağara between 1923 and 1967. It became a district in 1958 by separating from Saimbeyli.

== Composition ==
There are 35 neighbourhoods in Tufanbeyli District:

- Akçal
- Akpınar
- Ayvat
- Bozgüney
- Çatalçam
- Çukurkışla
- Cumhuriyet
- Damlalı
- Demiroluk
- Doğanbeyli
- Doğanlı
- Elemanlı
- Evci
- Fatih
- Fatmakuyu
- Güzelim
- Hanyeri
- İğdebel
- İstiklal
- Karsavuran
- Kayapınar
- Kayırcık
- Kirazlıyurt
- Koçcağız
- Mehmet Akif Ersoy
- Ortaköy
- Pekmezli
- Pınarlar
- Polatpınarı
- Şarköy
- Taşpınar
- Tozlu
- Yamanlı
- Yenicami
- Yeşilova

== Power station ==
Mercury air pollution from the coal-fired power station has been estimated at over 500 kg/year.
