= Hexapolis =

Hexapolis (Greek: Ἑξάπολις), meaning "six cities", may refer to:

- Doric Hexapolis, a federation of Greek city-states in southwestern Asia Minor founded by Doric colonists
- Armenian Hexapolis, a group of six cities in Armenia Minor
