= Kireç =

Kireç can refer to the following villages in Turkey:

- Kireç, Dursunbey
- Kireç Köyü
