= Bozgüney, Adana =

Settlement in Turkey

Bozgüney
- Neighbourhood
- Location in Turkey
- Coordinates: 38°14′52″N 36°19′30″E
- Country: Turkey
- Province: Adana
- District: Tufanbeyli
- Elevation: 1,500 m (4,900 ft)
- Population (2022): 988
- Time zone: UTC+3 (TRT)
- Postal code: 01640
- Area code: 0322

Bozgüney is a neighbourhood of the municipality and district of Tufanbeyli, Adana Province, Turkey. Its population is 988 (2022). Before the 2013 reorganisation, it was a town (belde).

== Geography ==
Bozgüney is at the extreme north of the Adana province. It is on the northern slopes of Toros Mountains with an altitude of 1,500 metres (4,900 ft). Distance to Adana is 200 kilometres (120 mi) and to Tufanbeyli is 13 kilometres (8.1 mi).

== History ==
The vicinity was inhabited throughout the history. The earliest settles were probably Luwians. The ruins of Comana, the Roman town, are a few kilometers west of Bozgüney. Although debatable, Comana is usually identified with Kummanni, the capital of the kingdom of Kizzuwatna during Hittite domination . The present residents are named Fakılar (a branch of Afshar Turkmens) who had migrated from north Turkistan to Anatolia in mid 14th century. In 1999 Bozgüney was declared township.

== Economy ==
Main economic activities are agriculture, animal husbandry and carpet weaving.
