= Fatmakuyu, Tufanbeyli =

Fatmakuyu
- Neighbourhood
- Location in Turkey
- Coordinates: 38°11′38″N 36°22′22″E
- Country: Turkey
- Province: Adana
- District: Tufanbeyli
- Population (2022): 48
- Time zone: UTC+3 (TRT)

Fatmakuyu is a neighbourhood in the municipality and district of Tufanbeyli, Adana Province, Turkey. It is populated by Kurds and had a population of 48 in 2022.
