= Karsavuran, Tufanbeyli =

Karsavuran
- Neighbourhood
- Location in Turkey
- Coordinates: 38°10′41″N 36°10′04″E
- Country: Turkey
- Province: Adana
- District: Tufanbeyli
- Population (2022): 465
- Time zone: UTC+3 (TRT)

Karsavuran is a neighbourhood in the municipality and district of Tufanbeyli, Adana Province, Turkey. Its population is 465 (2022).
