= Yeşilova, Tufanbeyli =

Yeşilova
- Neighbourhood
- Country: Turkey
- Province: Adana
- District: Tufanbeyli
- Population (2022): 247
- Time zone: UTC+3 (TRT)

Yeşilova is a neighbourhood in the municipality and district of Tufanbeyli, Adana Province, Turkey. Its population is 247 (2022).
