= Akpınar, Tufanbeyli =

Akpınar
- Neighbourhood
- Location in Turkey
- Coordinates: 38°13′59″N 36°11′9″E
- Country: Turkey
- Province: Adana
- District: Tufanbeyli
- Population (2022): 229
- Time zone: UTC+3 (TRT)

Akpınar is a neighbourhood in the municipality and district of Tufanbeyli, Adana Province, Turkey. Its population is 229 (2022).
