= Pınarlar, Tufanbeyli =

Pınarlar
- Neighbourhood
- Location in Turkey
- Coordinates: 38°13′46″N 36°14′05″E
- Country: Turkey
- Province: Adana
- District: Tufanbeyli
- Population (2022): 206
- Time zone: UTC+3 (TRT)

Pınarlar is a neighbourhood in the municipality and district of Tufanbeyli, Adana Province, Turkey. Its population is 206 (2022).
