= Farasa bilingual inscription =

Greek-Aramaic inscription

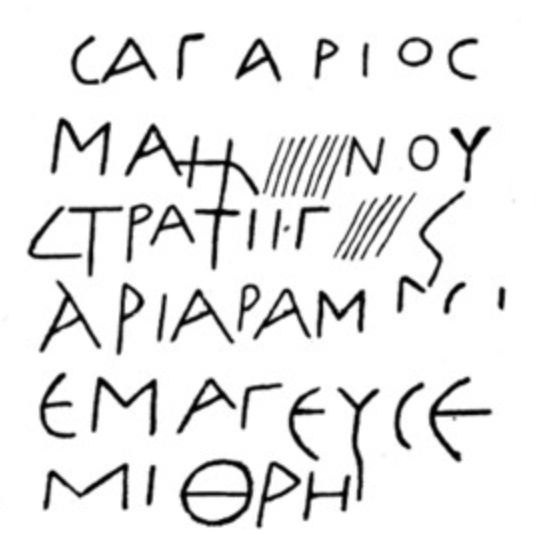
Farasa bilingual (copy of the Greek text)

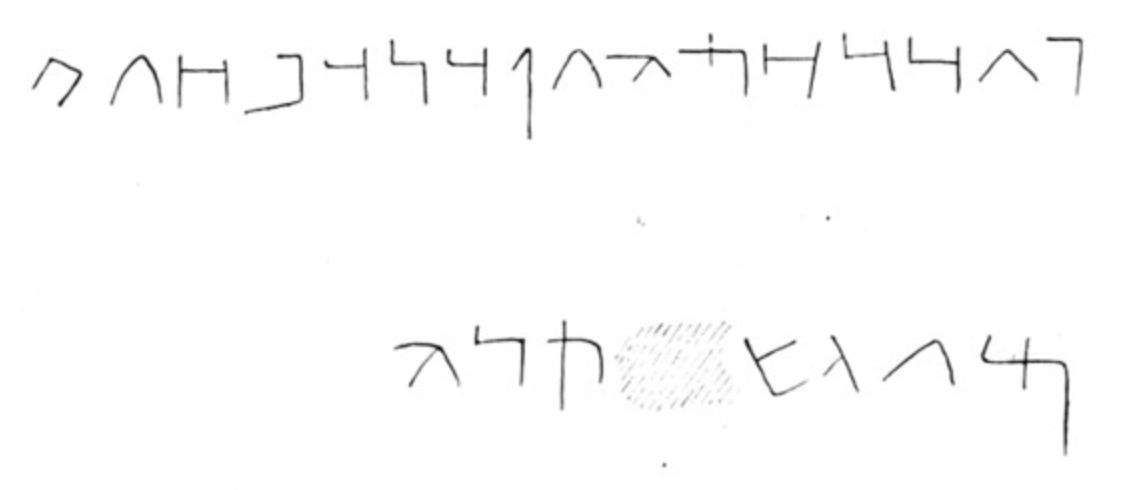
Farasa bilingual (copy of the Aramaic text)

The Farasa bilingual inscription, originally known as the Zindji-Dérè or Zindji-Dara inscription, is a bilingual Greek-Aramaic inscription found along the Zamantı River outside Farasa, Cappadocia (Greek: Φάρασ(σ)α, then a small Greek-speaking enclave with its own dialect known as Pharasiot Greek), known today as Çamlıca village in Yahyalı, Kayseri). It was identified in modern times by Anastasios Levidhis of the town of Zindji-Dérè, and first published in 1905 by Josef Markwart.

The Aramaic inscription is known as KAI 265.

== Translation ==
The Greek text reads, "Sagarios the son of Magapharnes, strategos of Ariaramneia, sacrificed to Mithra."
