= Demiroluk, Tufanbeyli =

Demiroluk
- Neighbourhood
- Location in Turkey
- Coordinates: 38°13′33″N 36°03′49″E
- Country: Turkey
- Province: Adana
- District: Tufanbeyli
- Population (2022): 342
- Time zone: UTC+3 (TRT)

Demiroluk is a neighbourhood in the municipality and district of Tufanbeyli, Adana Province, Turkey. Its population is 342 (2022).
