= Pekmezli, Tufanbeyli =

Pekmezli
- Neighbourhood
- Location in Turkey
- Coordinates: 38°08′32″N 36°03′10″E
- Country: Turkey
- Province: Adana
- District: Tufanbeyli
- Population (2022): 890
- Time zone: UTC+3 (TRT)

Pekmezli is a neighbourhood in the municipality and district of Tufanbeyli, Adana Province, Turkey. Its population is 890 (2022). The village inhabited by Turkmens of the Varsak tribe.
