= İğdebel, Tufanbeyli =

İğdebel
- Neighbourhood
- Location in Turkey
- Coordinates: 38°17′N 36°22′E
- Country: Turkey
- Province: Adana
- District: Tufanbeyli
- Population (2022): 96
- Time zone: UTC+3 (TRT)

İğdebel is a neighbourhood in the municipality and district of Tufanbeyli, Adana Province, Turkey. Its population is 96 (2022).
