= Damlalı, Tufanbeyli =

Damlalı
- Neighbourhood
- Location in Turkey
- Coordinates: 38°15′49″N 36°10′40″E
- Country: Turkey
- Province: Adana
- District: Tufanbeyli
- Population (2022): 293
- Time zone: UTC+3 (TRT)

Damlalı is a neighbourhood in the municipality and district of Tufanbeyli, Adana Province, Turkey. Its population is 293 (2022).
