= Hanyeri, Tufanbeyli =

Hanyeri
- Neighbourhood
- Location in Turkey
- Coordinates: 38°12′45″N 36°01′22″E
- Country: Turkey
- Province: Adana
- District: Tufanbeyli
- Population (2022): 66
- Time zone: UTC+3 (TRT)

Hanyeri is a neighbourhood in the municipality and district of Tufanbeyli, Adana Province, Turkey. It is populated by Kurds and had a population of 66 in 2022.
