= Doğanlı, Tufanbeyli =

Doğanlı
- Neighbourhood
- Location in Turkey
- Coordinates: 38°14′35″N 36°07′53″E
- Country: Turkey
- Province: Adana
- District: Tufanbeyli
- Population (2022): 628
- Time zone: UTC+3 (TRT)

Doğanlı is a neighbourhood in the municipality and district of Tufanbeyli, Adana Province, Turkey. Its population is 628 (2022).
