= Yamanlı, Tufanbeyli =

Yamanlı
- Neighbourhood
- Location in Turkey
- Coordinates: 38°10′45″N 36°14′24″E
- Country: Turkey
- Province: Adana
- District: Tufanbeyli
- Population (2022): 518
- Time zone: UTC+3 (TRT)

Yamanlı is a neighbourhood in the municipality and district of Tufanbeyli, Adana Province, Turkey. Its population is 518 (2022).
