= Gücüksu =

- Neighbourhood
- Location in Turkey
- Coordinates: 38°03′9″N 36°39′14″E
- Country: Turkey
- Province: Kahramanmaraş
- District: Göksun
- Population (2022): 423
- Time zone: UTC+3 (TRT)

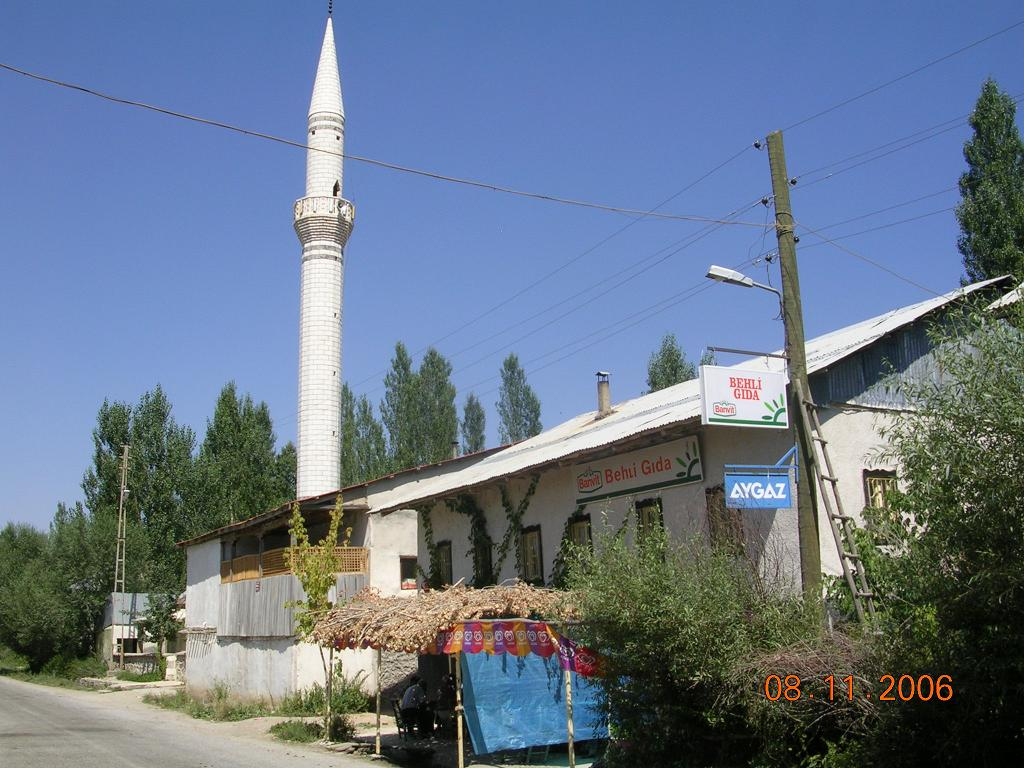
Village of Gücüksu

Gücüksu is a neighbourhood of the municipality and district of Göksun, Kahramanmaraş Province, Turkey. Its population is 423 (2022).
