= Payamburnu, Göksun =

Payamburnu
- Neighbourhood
- Location in Turkey
- Coordinates: 37°53′N 36°19′E
- Country: Turkey
- Province: Kahramanmaraş
- District: Göksun
- Population (2022): 83
- Time zone: UTC+3 (TRT)

Payamburnu is a neighbourhood in the municipality and district of Göksun, Kahramanmaraş Province, Turkey. Its population is 83 (2022). In 2008 it passed from the Saimbeyli District (Adana Province) to the Göksun District.
