= Çatalçam, Tufanbeyli =

Çatalçam
- Neighbourhood
- Location in Turkey
- Coordinates: 38°11′41″N 36°04′47″E
- Country: Turkey
- Province: Adana
- District: Tufanbeyli
- Population (2022): 1,410
- Time zone: UTC+3 (TRT)

Çatalçam is a neighbourhood in the municipality and district of Tufanbeyli, Adana Province, Turkey. Its population is 1,410 (2022). The village inhabited by Turkmens of the Varsak tribe.
