= Kirazlıyurt, Tufanbeyli =

Kirazlıyurt
- Neighbourhood
- Location in Turkey
- Coordinates: 38°06′N 36°17′E
- Country: Turkey
- Province: Adana
- District: Tufanbeyli
- Population (2022): 485
- Time zone: UTC+3 (TRT)

Kirazlıyurt is a neighbourhood in the municipality and district of Tufanbeyli, Adana Province, Turkey. Its population is 485 (2022).
