= Ayvat, Tufanbeyli =

Ayvat
- Neighbourhood
- Location in Turkey
- Coordinates: 38.34840°N 36.22918°E
- Country: Turkey
- Province: Adana
- District: Tufanbeyli
- Population (2022): 180
- Time zone: UTC+3 (TRT)

Ayvat is a neighbourhood in the municipality and district of Tufanbeyli, Adana Province, Turkey. Its population is 180 (2022).
