= Kayırcık, Tufanbeyli =

Kayırcık
- Neighbourhood
- Location in Turkey
- Coordinates: 38°10′18″N 36°16′53″E
- Country: Turkey
- Province: Adana
- District: Tufanbeyli
- Population (2022): 735
- Time zone: UTC+3 (TRT)

Kayırcık (also: Kayarcık) is a neighbourhood in the municipality and district of Tufanbeyli, Adana Province, Turkey. Its population is 735 (2022).
