= Ismail Hakkı Berkok =

Turkish general, historian and politician of Circassian descent

Ismail Hakkı Berkok 1306 (1890)-11 May 1954
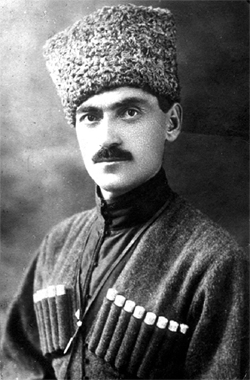
- Ismail Hakkı Berkok
- Born: 1890; Pinarbashi district, Kayseri Province, Ottoman Empire
- Died: 11 March 1954 (aged 63–64); London, United Kingdom
- Education: Imperial Military Staff College
- Military career
- Allegiance: Ottoman Empire; Mountainous Republic; Turkey
- Service years: Ottoman: 1910–1923; Mountainous Republic: 1918–1920; Turkey: 1923–1946
- Rank: Brigadier general
- Conflicts: First World War; War of Independence

Ismail Hakkı Berkok (Turkish: İsmail Hakkı Berkok, Kabardian: Жэрэщты Алий икъуэ Исмел; 1890 – 11 May 1954) was a Turkish general, publicist, historian and deputy of the Grand National Assembly of Turkey of Circassian origin. He wrote a detailed work about Circassian history and was a Circassian nationalist.

== Ancestry and early life ==
Father of Ismail – Ali Berkok was a muhajir from the North Caucasus. He descended from an aristocratic family from Dzhereshti (Jereshty). Together with his brother Yusuf he moved to the Ottoman Empire after the Russo-Turkish War (1877–78) following the Russo-Circassian War.

After the relocation, they settled in the Kayseri Province in the Pinarbashi district and called it Jereshty. Ismail Hakkı Berkok was born there.

He lost his parents early, but in spite of all the difficulties Ismail Berkok yet graduated from high school and enrolled in the Ottoman Military College, which he graduated from in 1910.

== In the World War I and Turkish War of Independence ==
World War Ismail Berkok met in Macedonia on the Balkan front. Then he participated in operations and hostilities in the Caucasus and the Middle East fronts, particularly in Iraq.

After the February Revolution in the Russian Empire, in the North Caucasus and Transcaucasia intensified separatist forces to dream of a free and united Caucasus. In support of this statement the peoples of the Caucasus, after the signing of the 8 June 1918 friendship treaty between the Ottoman Empire and the Mountainous Republic of the Northern Caucasus, the Ottoman leadership was organized in May 1918 an expeditionary force numbering of 652 soldiers and officers, under the leadership of Ismail Berkok. This group was organized mainly of descendants of Muhajirs. The purpose of the order was the formation of the Islamic Army of the Caucasus mountaineers itself. Ismail Berkok stayed in the North Caucasus until 1920.

In 1920 he returned from the North Caucasus, and takes an active part in the Turkish War of Independence under the leadership of Mustafa Kemal (Atatürk).

== In the Republican period ==
After the war of independence involved in various military missions of the republican government. He gets the title of brigadier general of the Turkish Republic. In 1936 he became chairman of the Council of Military History. Since the beginning of the World War II was appointed to the Mobilization Directorate in Ministry of National Defence. Since 1943, member of the Military Court of Cassation. Before retirement in 1946, member of the Supreme Military Court of the Turkish Republic.

== The last years and death ==
In 1950 he was elected to the Turkish Grand National Assembly of the Democratic Party from his native region of Kayseri. Four years later, he was re-elected to Parliament, but, on 11 May 1954m after surgery in London, General Ismail Berkok died. He was buried with military honors in the Turkish capital Ankara.

== Medals and Orders ==
Liakat Medal (medal "For Merits" Turkish: Liyakat Madalyası)

Imtiyaz Medal (medal "For Distinction" Turkish: İmtiyaz Madalyası)

Medal of Independence (Turkish: İstiklal Madalyası)

Order of Osmanieh (Turkish: Nishani Osmani)
