= Taşpınar, Tufanbeyli =

Taşpınar
- Neighbourhood
- Location in Turkey
- Coordinates: 38°13′26″N 36°16′11″E
- Country: Turkey
- Province: Adana
- District: Tufanbeyli
- Population (2022): 63
- Time zone: UTC+3 (TRT)

Taşpınar is a neighbourhood in the municipality and district of Tufanbeyli, Adana Province, Turkey. It is populated by Kurds and had a population of 63 in 2022.
