= Evci, Tufanbeyli =

Evci
- Neighbourhood
- Location in Turkey
- Coordinates: 38°12′00″N 36°06′18″E
- Country: Turkey
- Province: Adana
- District: Tufanbeyli
- Population (2022): 158
- Time zone: UTC+3 (TRT)

Evci is a neighbourhood in the municipality and district of Tufanbeyli, Adana Province, Turkey. Its population is 158 (2022). The village is inhabited by Tahtacı.
