= Polatpınarı, Tufanbeyli =

Polatpınarı
- Neighbourhood
- Location in Turkey
- Coordinates: 38°17′N 36°17′E
- Country: Turkey
- Province: Adana
- District: Tufanbeyli
- Population (2022): 174
- Time zone: UTC+3 (TRT)

Polatpınarı (also: Bolatpınarı) is a neighbourhood in the municipality and district of Tufanbeyli, Adana Province, Turkey. Its population is 174 (2022).
