= Koçcağız, Tufanbeyli =

Koçcağız
- Neighbourhood
- Location in Turkey
- Coordinates: 38°17′33″N 36°07′44″E
- Country: Turkey
- Province: Adana
- District: Tufanbeyli
- Population (2022): 36
- Time zone: UTC+3 (TRT)

Koçcağız is a neighbourhood in the municipality and district of Tufanbeyli, Adana Province, Turkey. Its population is 36 (2022).
