= Elemanlı, Tufanbeyli =

Elemanlı
- Neighbourhood
- Location in Turkey
- Coordinates: 38.3196°N 36.2860°E
- Country: Turkey
- Province: Adana
- District: Tufanbeyli
- Population (2022): 258
- Time zone: UTC+3 (TRT)

Elemanlı (formerly: Çakırlar) is a neighbourhood in the municipality and district of Tufanbeyli, Adana Province, Turkey. Its population is 258 (2022).
