= Ma (goddess) =

Anatolian goddess

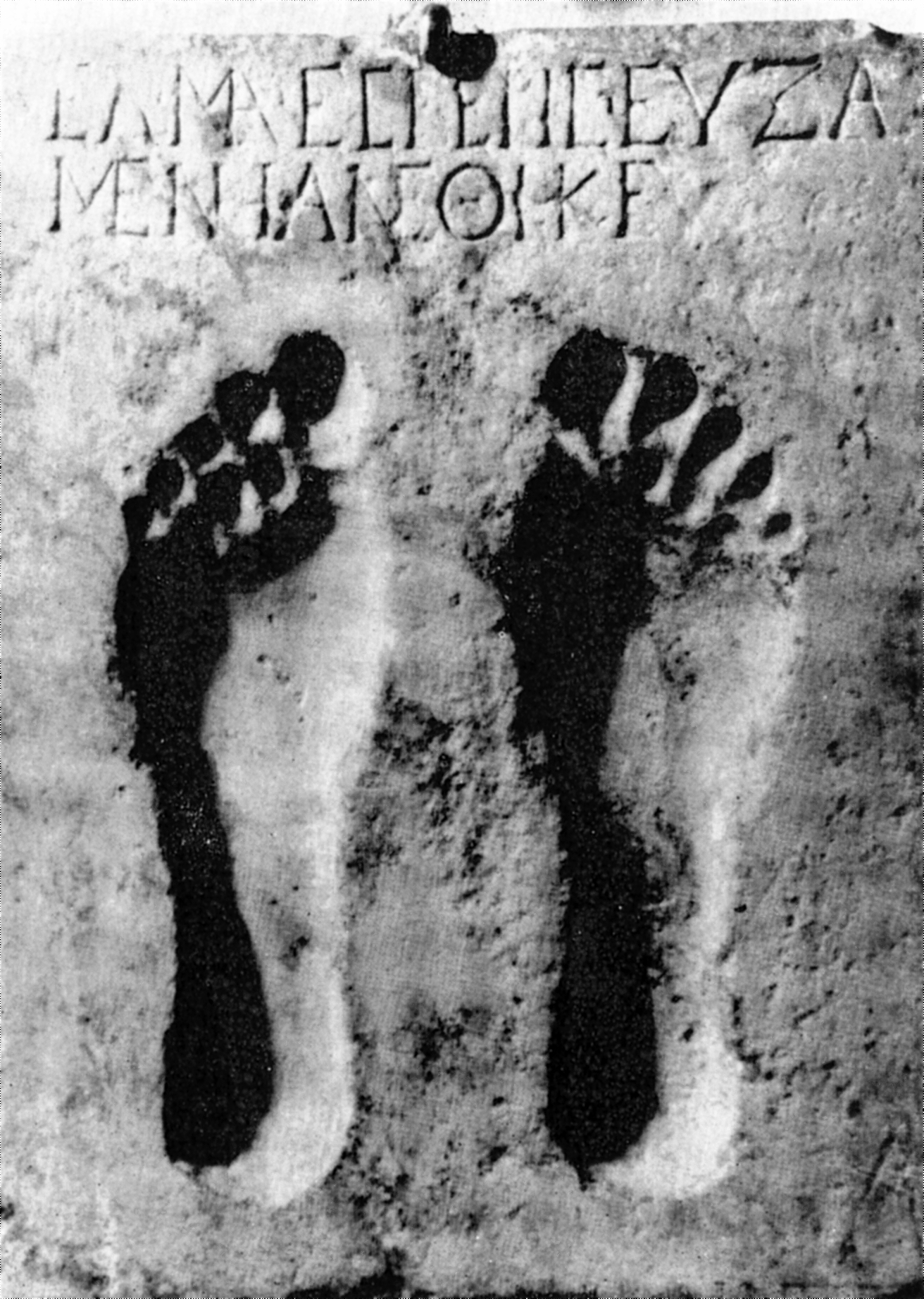
A dedication to the goddess Ma with the imprint of a bare foot, first century BC (National Museum in Warsaw).

Ma was a local goddess at Comana in Cappadocia. Her name Ma means "Mother", and she also had the epithets "Invincible" and "Bringer of Victory".

== History ==
Ma has been interpreted as a mother goddess, but at the same time as a warrior goddess, as her name and epithets indicate both.

She was associated with the transition of adulthood of both genders, and sacred sex rituals were practiced during her biennial festivals.

Ma was also seen as a moon goddess, being associated with the Anatolia moon god Mēn, with a temple estate dedicated to Mēn Pharnakou and Selene at Ameria, near Cabira, in the Kingdom of Pontus, being an attempt to counter-balance the influence of the Moon goddess Ma of Comana.

Ma has been identified with a number of other deities, indicating her function. She has been compared to Cybele and Bellona. The ancient Greeks compared Ma to the goddess Enyo and Athena Nicephorus. Plutarch likened her with Semele and Athena. Ma was introduced and worshiped in Macedonia together with other foreign deities.

Ma-Enyo, a fusion between the Anatolian goddess Ma and the Greek Goddess, Enyo, was considered the great west Asian nature-goddess, with Comana's temple and its fame in ancient times as the place where the rites of this, a variety of the nature goddess, were celebrated with much solemnity.

== Cult ==
Ma is described as a local Anatolian goddess, with her cult centered around her temple at Komana in Cappadocia. Her temple in Comana is described by Strabo.

Stephanus of Byzantium reports that Ma was regarded as a companion of Rhea. Zeus entrusted the infant Dionysus to her so that she could nurse and raise him. When Hera asked whose child the infant was, Ma replied that he was the son of Ares in order to conceal his true identity. From this story, the Carians derived the epithet "Masaris" (Μάσαρις) for Dionysus, meaning "Ma's Ares". He also adds that Rhea herself was called Ma among the Lydians, where a bull was sacrificed in her honour. The city of Mastaura (Μάσταυρα) was said to have taken its name from this cult, being interpreted as "Ma's bull".

== See also ==
- Mah
- Men (deity)
