= Kayapınar, Tufanbeyli =

Kayapınar
- Neighbourhood
- Location in Turkey
- Coordinates: 38°19′42″N 36°16′02″E
- Country: Turkey
- Province: Adana
- District: Tufanbeyli
- Population (2022): 81
- Time zone: UTC+3 (TRT)

Kayapınar is a neighbourhood in the municipality and district of Tufanbeyli, Adana Province, Turkey. Its population is 81 (2022).
