= Şarköy, Tufanbeyli =

Şarköy
- Neighbourhood
- Location in Turkey
- Coordinates: 38°19′50″N 36°19′29″E
- Country: Turkey
- Province: Adana
- District: Tufanbeyli
- Population (2022): 293
- Time zone: UTC+3 (TRT)

Şarköy (also: Şar) is a neighbourhood in the municipality and district of Tufanbeyli, Adana Province, Turkey. Its population is 293 (2022). The ruins of the ancient city of Comana are situated near Şarköy.
