= Ortaköy, Tufanbeyli =

Ortaköy
- Neighbourhood
- Location in Turkey
- Coordinates: 38.1667°N 36.0667°E
- Country: Turkey
- Province: Adana
- District: Tufanbeyli
- Population (2022): 436
- Time zone: UTC+3 (TRT)

Ortaköy is a neighbourhood in the municipality and district of Tufanbeyli, Adana Province, Turkey. Its population is 436 (2022).
