= Akçal, Tufanbeyli =

Akçal
- Neighbourhood
- Location in Turkey
- Coordinates: 38°12′25″N 36°19′27″E
- Country: Turkey
- Province: Adana
- District: Tufanbeyli
- Population (2022): 62
- Time zone: UTC+3 (TRT)

Akçal is a neighbourhood in the municipality and district of Tufanbeyli, Adana Province, Turkey. It is populated by Kurds and had a population of 62 in 2022.
