= Bozgüney, Lachin =

Bozgüney
- Location within Azerbaijan Location within East Zangezur Economic Region
- Coordinates: 39°47′10″N 46°30′12″E
- Country: Azerbaijan
- District: Lachin
- Time zone: UTC+4 (AZT)
  - Summer (DST): UTC+5 (AZT)

Bozgüney (Bozguney) is a village in the Lachin District of Azerbaijan.
