= Kireçköy =

- Neighbourhood
- Location in Turkey
- Coordinates: 37°58′34″N 36°30′11″E
- Country: Turkey
- Province: Kahramanmaraş
- District: Göksun
- Population (2022): 96
- Time zone: UTC+3 (TRT)

Kireçköy is a neighbourhood of the municipality and district of Göksun, Kahramanmaraş Province, Turkey. Its population is 96 (2022). It is located south of Göksun, and is surrounded by mountains.
