= Doğanbeyli, Tufanbeyli =

Doğanbeyli
- Neighbourhood
- Location in Turkey
- Coordinates: 38°07′54″N 36°08′03″E
- Country: Turkey
- Province: Adana
- District: Tufanbeyli
- Population (2022): 703
- Time zone: UTC+3 (TRT)

Doğanbeyli is a neighbourhood in the municipality and district of Tufanbeyli, Adana Province, Turkey. Its population is 703 (2022).
