= Flirtboat =

Dating game website

Flirtboat was a dating game website created by Sysis. It was available in Austria, the United Kingdom, and Croatia between 2000 and 2003.

== Launch ==
Flirtboat was built on Sysis' NetLife platform. It first launched in Austria in November 2000. The website was also made available in the United Kingdom from 2001 to 2003, and in Croatia from 2001 to 2002. The website was hosted in different locations in each country; the Croatian version was hosted on jet2web, on iCircle (a Freeserve portal) in the UK, and via VIPnet in Croatia. In the UK, the website was sponsored by webdating.co.uk.

Flirtboat had 10,000 players in the first 10 days following its launch in the UK.

== Gameplay ==
Users of the website created avatars to represent themselves, and joined one of four virtual three-month cruises, during which time they could speak to other users and take part in events. The aim was to build up "flirtpoints" and kisses. The users avatar would take part in activities and perform actions with other avatars, and then ask the user to decide what they should do next upon login. Users directed their avatars to take certain actions, which would take place asynchronously without direct input. Users selected one of 32 stylised avatars to represent them; 16 male and 16 female.

Upon creating an account, users answered a questionnaire to create their avatar's gender, age, personality, and other information. The cruise would also contain non-player characters who interacted with the user's avatar, providing advice, news, or asking questions. The website also contained chatrooms for players to communicate with each other in different areas of the cruise ship, such as the cafe.

Each week the users with the highest number of points were designated as 'Champion flirts'. The user with the most points at the end of all four cruises won a holiday.

Sysis collected data on each of the players by asking them a total of 400-500 question over the course of the cruise, data which they then planned to offer to other companies.

== Players ==
Flirtboat was studied as an example of early use of online avatars. Studies found that over the course of each 90 day cruise, users logged in to the website on an average of 33 days. The userbase was consisted predominantly of avatars under 30, and male avatars outnumbered female except in the under 19 age group, and on the Croatian application. Despite the larger number of male avatars, female avatars were more likely to be active and took more in-game actions than male ones. According to Freeserve in 2001, half of Flirtboat's users were married or living with someone.

== Reception ==
Writing in The Independent, Sally Chatterton described Flirtboat as "a site to be avoided at all costs", criticising its players as "losers".
