= Ariaramneia =

City in ancient Cappadocia

Ariaramneia (Greek: Αριαραμνεία) was a city in ancient Cappadocia, a historic region located in present-day Turkey. Attested in an inscription in Greek and Aramaic, Ariaramneia was the place of residence of a military leader in the 2nd century BC, during the existence of the Kingdom of Cappadocia. The Iranologist Alireza Shapour Shahbazi notes that in all likelihood Ariaramneia was named after and founded by Ariaramnes, father of Ariarathes II of Cappadocia.
