= Tozlu, Tufanbeyli =

Tozlu
- Neighbourhood
- Location in Turkey
- Coordinates: 38°17′44″N 36°07′34″E
- Country: Turkey
- Province: Adana
- District: Tufanbeyli
- Population (2022): 116
- Time zone: UTC+3 (TRT)

Tozlu is a neighbourhood in the municipality and district of Tufanbeyli, Adana Province, Turkey. Its population is 116 (2022).
