= Kesun =

Kesun may refer to:

- an alternative spelling for the Fortress of Kaysun, a fortress located near the town of Çakırhüyük in the Adıyaman Province in Turkey
- Çakırhüyük, Besni in Turkey, formerly called K'esun
- Kesun (annelid), a worm genus in the family Opheliidae
