= Cataonia =

Part of ancient Cappadocia

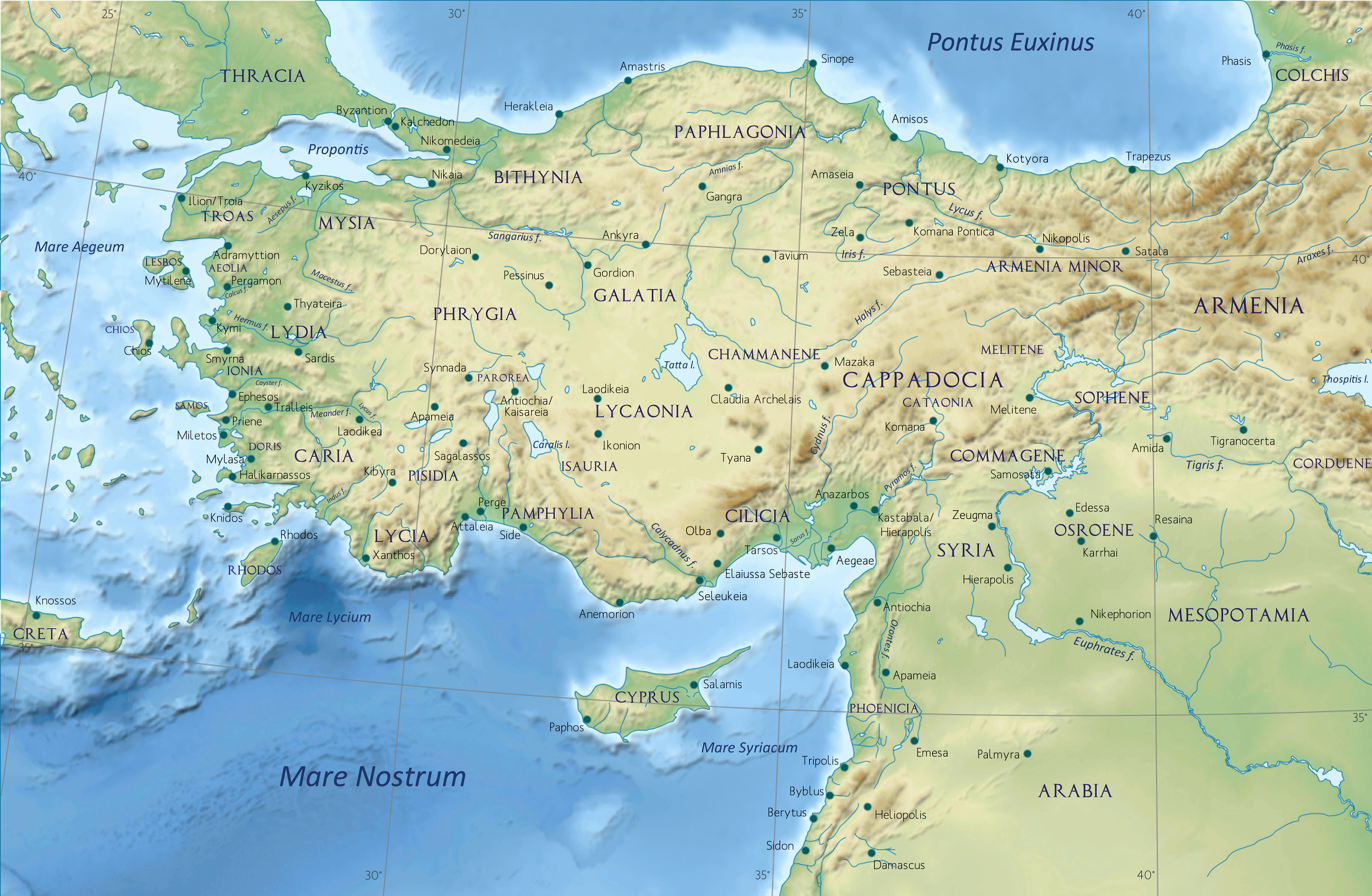
Anatolia/Asia Minor in the Greco-Roman period. The classical regions, including Cataonia within Cappadocia

Cataonia (Ancient Greek: Kαταoνία) was one of the divisions of ancient Cappadocia.

It is described by Strabo, who had visited it, as a level plain surrounded by mountains, on the south by the Amanus, and on the west by the Antitaurus, which branches off from the Cilician Taurus and contains deep narrow valleys (in one of which was situated Comana, a considerable city on the river Sarus, which flows through the gaps of the Taurus into Cilicia and the Mediterranean). Through the plain of Cataonia flows the river Pyramus, which has its source in the middle of the plain, and also passes through the gaps of the Taurus into Cilicia. The plain is very productive, except that it has no evergreens. Strabo speaks of a temple of Zeus Dacius, where there is a salt-lake of the considerable extent with steep banks, so that the descent to it is like going down steps; it was said that the water never increased, and had no visible outlet.

The plain of Cataonia contained no cities, but it had strong forts on the hills, such as Azamora and Dastarcum, round which the Carmalas flowed, probably the modern Zamantı River. It also contained a temple of Cataonian Apollo, which was in great repute in all Cappadocia. Ptolemy has a list of eleven places in his Cataonia, including Cabassus and Heraclea Cybistra, which is far beyond the limits of Strabo's Cataonia. In fact Ptolemy's Cataonia, if there is truth in it, must be a different division of the country. Cataonia also contains Mut (Claudiopolis). Cucusus, mentioned in the Antonine Itinerary, is today Göksun.

The inhabitants of Cataonia were distinguished by the ancients from the other Cappadocians as a different people. Strabo states that their original language was related to Cappadocian, but neither tongue can be securely classified as both are unattested, meaning that there are no known texts written in either. By his own time, Strabo could observe no difference, in manners or in language, between the Cataonians and the Cappadocians, and the people of Cataonia had been completely assimilated into Cappadocian culture, no longer retaining any distinctive language.
