= Comana (Cappadocia) =

City of Cappadocia and later Cataonia

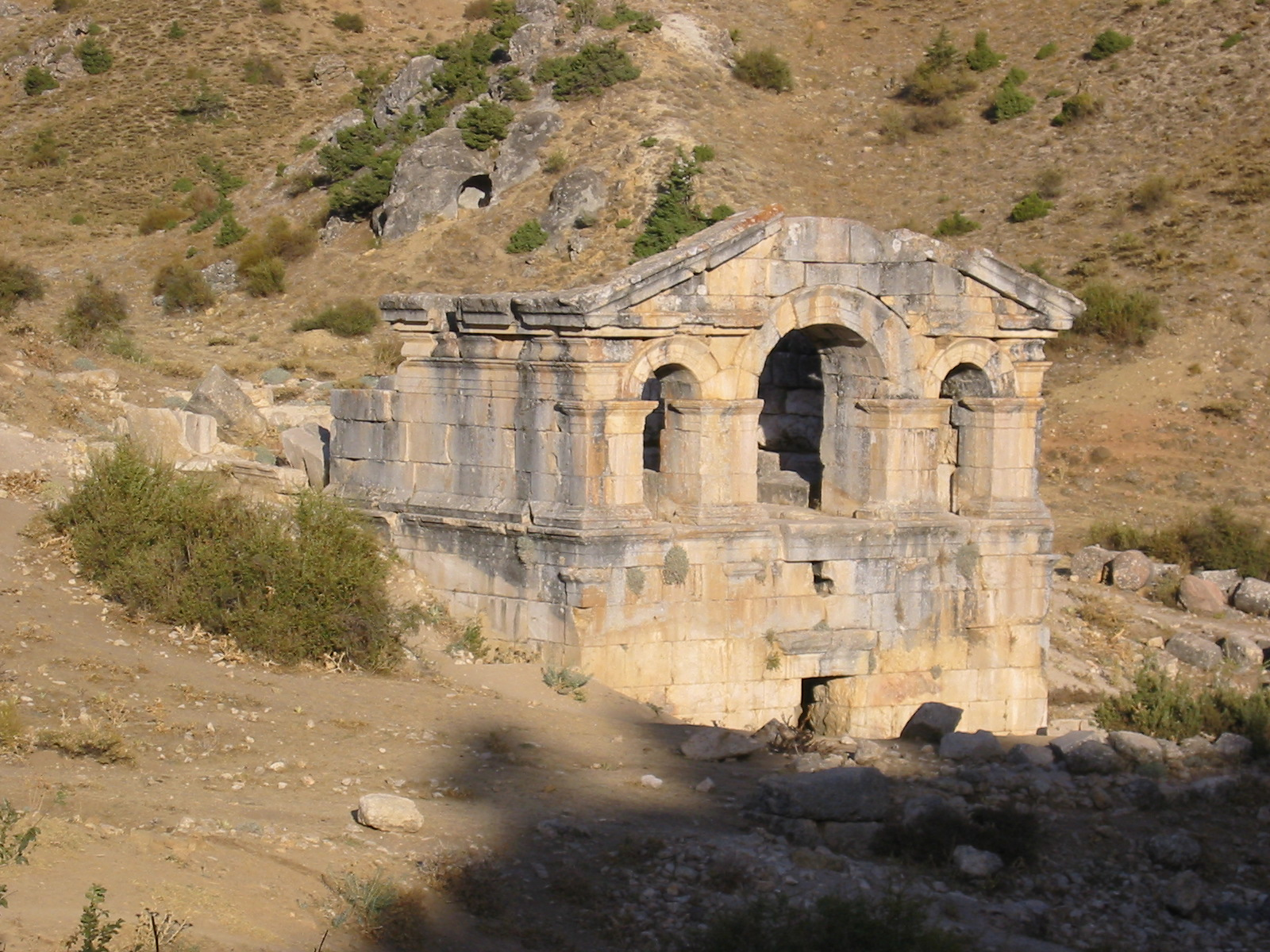
- Comana

- Location within Turkey
- 38°19′48″N 36°19′48″E
- Type: Settlement
- Location: Şar, Adana Province, Turkey
- Region: Cappadocia

Site notes
- Condition: In ruins

Comana was a city of Cappadocia (Greek: τὰ Κόμανα τῆς Καππαδοκίας) and later Cataonia (Latin: Comana Cataoniae; frequently called Comana Chryse or Aurea, i.e. "the golden", to distinguish it from Comana in Pontus). The Hittite toponym Kummanni is considered likely to refer to Comana, but the identification is not considered proven. Its ruins are at the modern Turkish village of Şarköy, Tufanbeyli district, Adana Province.

== History ==
According to ancient geographers, Comana was situated in Cappadocia (and later Cataonia). Another epithet for the city, found in inscriptions, is Hieropolis /ˌhaɪəˈræpəlɪs/ (Ancient Greek: Ἱεράπολις) 'sacred city', owing to a famous temple of the Syrian Moon goddess Enyo or, in the local language: Ma. Strabo and Julius Caesar visited it; the former enters into long details about its position in a deep valley on the Sarus (Seihoun) river. The temple and its fame in ancient times as the place where the rites of Ma-Enyo, a variety of the great west Asian nature-goddess, were celebrated with much solemnity. The service was carried on in a sumptuous temple with great magnificence by many thousands of hierodouloi (temple slaves). To defray expenses, large estates had been set apart, which yielded a more than royal revenue. The city, a mere apanage of the temple, was governed directly by the chief priest, who was always a member of the reigning Cappadocian family, and took rank next to the king. The number of persons engaged in the service of the temple, even in Strabo's time, was upwards of 6,000, and among these, to judge by the names common on local tomb-stones, were many Persians. Under the Romans the temple was reassigned to Bellona and Lycomedes established as high priest. Emperor Caracalla made Comana a Roman colony, and the temple-city received honors from later emperors down to the official recognition of Christianity. Comana Chryse, or the golden, appears from one of the Novellae of Justinian (Nov. 31. c. 1), to distinguish it from the Comana in Pontus. It was in the division which he named the Third Armenia, and which, he observes, contained Melitene, near the Euphrates.

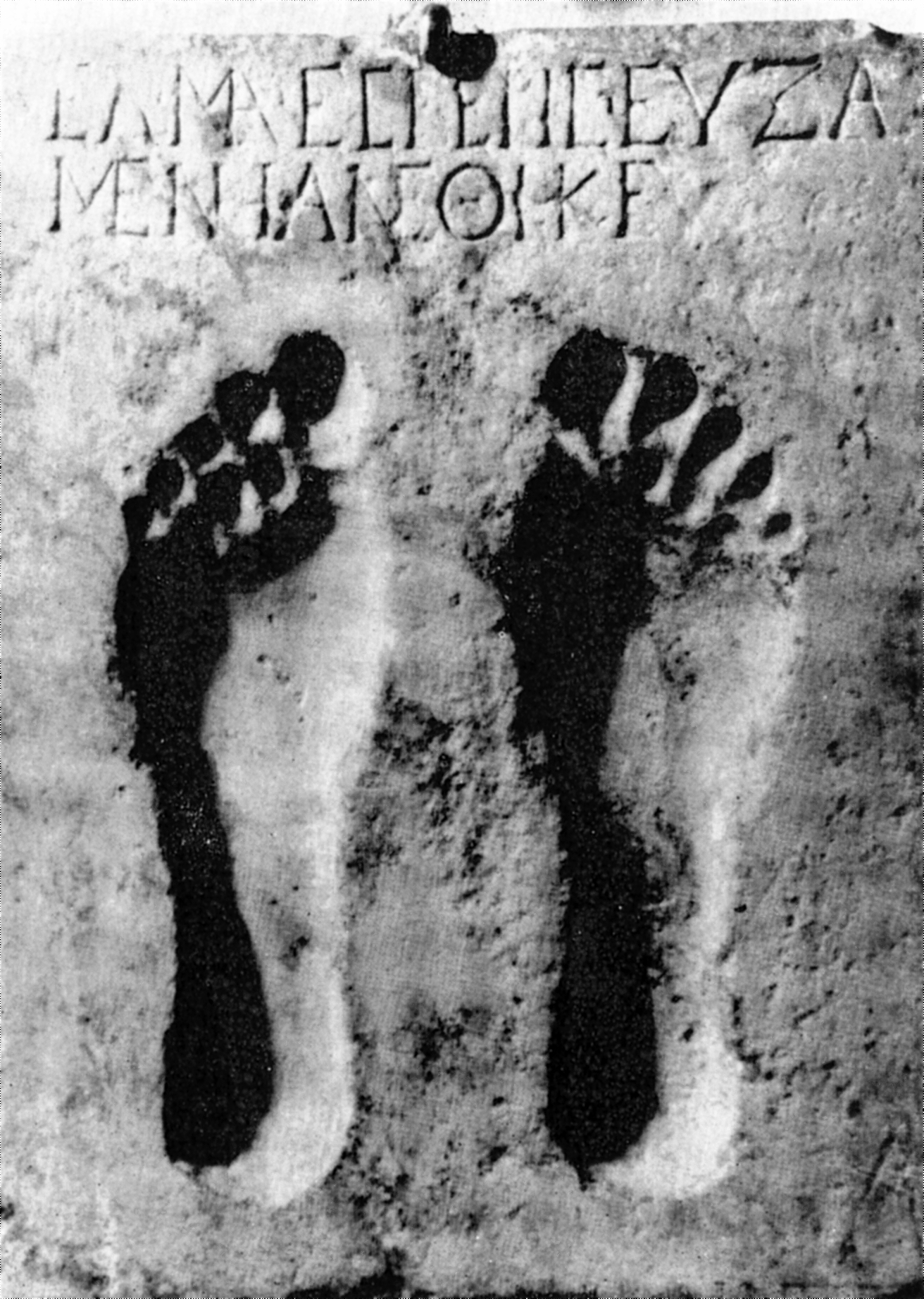
Dedication to the Comana's goddess Ma, National Museum in Warsaw.

There was a tradition that Orestes, with his sister, brought from Tauric Scythia the sacred rites of this temple, which were those of Tauropolos Artemis. Here Orestes deposited the hair that he cut from his head to commemorate the end of his sufferings (ἡ πένθιμος κόμη), and hence, according to a folk etymology of the Greeks, came the name of the place, Comana. And in later times, to make the name suit the story better, as it was supposed, it was changed to ἡ Κόμανα. (Eustath. ad Dionys. v. 694; Procop. Persic. i. 17.)

The city minted coins in antiquity that bear the epigraphs Col. Aug. Comana, and Col. Iul. Aug. Comanenoru or Comainoru.

The site lies at Şarköy or Şar (once usually transcribed Shahr), a village in the Anti-Taurus on the upper course of the Sarus (Sihun), mainly Armenian, but surrounded by later settlements of Avshar Turkomans and Circassians. The place has derived importance both in antiquity and now from its position at the eastern end of the main pass of the western Anti-Taurus range, the Kuru Çay, through which passed the road from Caesarea-Mazaca (modern Kayseri) to Melitene (modern Malatya), converted by Septimius Severus into the chief military road to the eastern frontier of the empire. The extant remains at Şar include a theatre on the left bank of the river, a fine Roman doorway and many inscriptions; but the exact site of the great temple has not been satisfactorily identified. There are many traces of Severus's road, including a bridge at Kemer, and an immense number of milestones, some in their original positions, others reused in cemeteries.

== Ecclesiastical history ==
It remains a Roman Catholic titular see of Asia Minor. St. Basiliscus was put to death at Comana and was buried there; according to Palladius, the historian of St. Chrysostom, he was bishop of the city, but this is very doubtful. Its bishop, Elpidius, was present at the First Council of Nicaea, in 325. Leontius, a semi-Arian, held the see in the time of the Emperor Jovian. Bishop Heraclius appeared at the Council of Chalcedon in 451: Comana was then a suffragan of Melitene, the metropolis of Armenia Secunda; since then it figures as such in most of the Notitiae episcopatuum to the twelfth century. Two other bishops are known: Hormizes, or Mormisdas, about 458 (letter to the Emperor Leo; see also Photius, Biblioth., Cod. 51) and Theodorus at the Fifth Ecumenical Council, in 553.

The ruins of Comana are visible ten miles north-west of Guksun (Cocussus), in the Ottoman vilayet of Adana (Lequien, I, 447; William Mitchell Ramsay, The Historical Geography of Asia Minor).

== Homonymous dioceses ==
- Another episcopal see named Comana, suffragan of Neocaesarea, was situated in Pontus Polemoniacus; it had also a temple of Ma and was surnamed Hierocaesarea 'Caesar's sacred [city]'. It was captured by Sulla, 83 B.C. Six bishops are mentioned by Lequien (I, 517); the first is St. Alexander the Charcoal-Seller, consecrated by St. Gregory the Wonder-Worker. This town became modern Gomenek, or Gomanak, a village south-west of Neocaesarea (Niksar), in the Ottoman vilayet of Sivas.
- Lequien (I, 1009) gives another Comana in Pamphylia Prima, suffragan of Side; the true name is Conana. Zoticus, who lived at the time of Montanus, was bishop of Conana in Pamphylia or of Comama in Pontus, not of Comana in Cappadocia. Cosmas of Conana appeared at the Third Council of Constantinople in 680. Conana became modern Gunen, in the Ottoman vilayet of Adana.

== See also ==
- Saint John the Baptist, whose head was found at Comana in the 9th century, according to Church tradition
