= Göksun =

- District and municipality
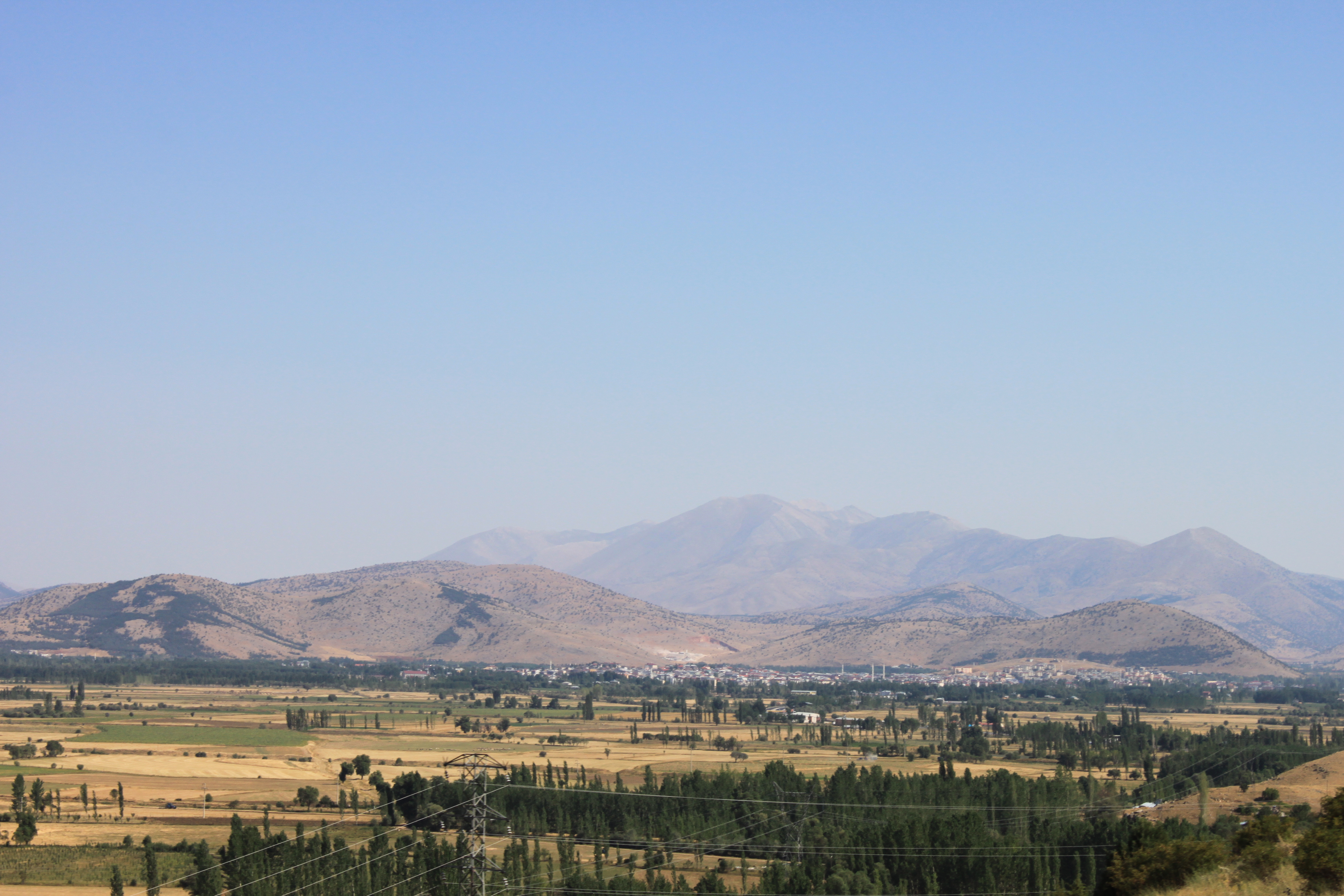

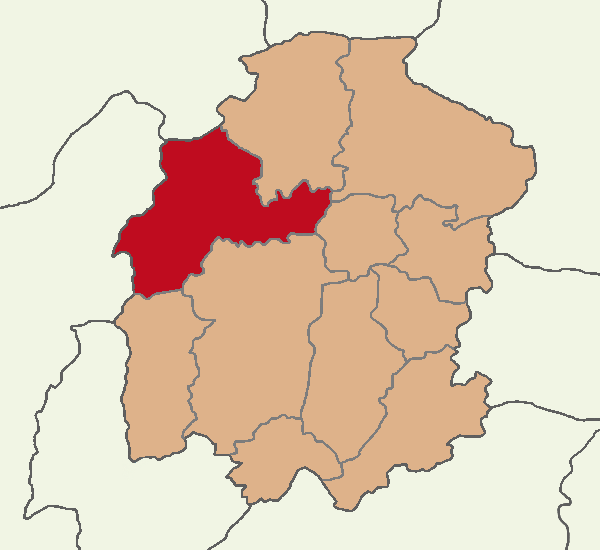
- Map showing Göksun District in Kahramanmaraş Province

- Location within Turkey
- Coordinates: 38°01′16″N 36°29′30″E
- Country: Turkey
- Province: Kahramanmaraş

Government
  - Mayor: Selim Cüce (YRP)
- Area: 1,942 km^{2} (750 sq mi)
- Elevation: 1,350 m (4,430 ft)
- Population (2022): 50,676
  - Density: 26.09/km^{2} (67.59/sq mi)
- Time zone: UTC+3 (TRT)
- Postal code: 46600
- Area code: 0344
- Website: www.goksun.bel.tr

Göksun (Greek: Κυκυσός, romanized: Kykysós, or Κουκουσός, Koukousós; Latin: Coxon or Cucusus; Armenian: Կոկիսոն) is a municipality and district of Kahramanmaraş Province, Turkey. Its area is 1,942 km^{2}, and its population is 50,676 (2022). It is near one of the sources of the Ceyhan River (ancient Pyramos), in the ancient region of Cataonia.

== History ==
Cucusus has an ancient history, first included in Cataonia, then in Cappadocia, and then in the Roman province of Armenia Secunda. The Byzantine bishops, Paul the Confessor (died 350 AD), John Chrysostom (died 407 AD) and Emperor Basiliscus (died 476 AD) either died in or were exiled to this remote place. Of its bishops, Domnus took part in the Council of Chalcedon (451), Longinus was a signatory of the joint letter of the bishops of the province of Armenia Secunda to Byzantine Emperor Leo I the Thracian in 458 concerning the murder of Proterius of Alexandria, Ioannes was at the Second Council of Constantinople (553), and another Ioannes at the Trullan Council of 692. No longer a residential bishopric, Cucusus is today listed by the Catholic Church as a titular see.

In the mid-10th century the town received many Armenian immigrants fleeing the Seljuk Turkish invasion and by 1097, when the army of the First Crusade marched towards the region and arrived at Cucusus, they encountered a large prosperous town populated by Armenians. The town, most likely with its own wall, remained under control of the Armenian princes of Cilicia but was abandoned due to Türkmen raids around 1375, with its inhabitants taking refuge in the towns of Hadjin and Zeitun. After that, the town became part of the Beylik of Dulkadir before it was conquered by the Ottoman Turks in 1515. In April 1915, the remaining Armenian population of Cucusus was deported during the Armenian Genocide.

== 2009 helicopter crash ==
On March 25, 2009, a chartered helicopter carrying Great Union Party's (BBP) Muhsin Yazıcıoğlu, three of his party's local leaders, and a reporter crashed at Mount Keş. The pilot and all the passengers but the reporter were killed. İsmail Güneş, who initially survived, made an emergency call reporting the accident. A massive search and rescue operation, attended by thousands and assisted by helicopters and aircraft, was conducted. However, the wreckage and the five bodies were recovered only 47 hours later. The corpse of the reporter was found five days later far from the crash site.

== Composition ==
There are 76 neighbourhoods in Göksun District:

- Acıelma
- Ahmetçik
- Alıçlıbucak
- Altınoba
- Apıklar
- Arslanbeyçiftliği
- Bahçelievler
- Berit
- Bozarmut
- Bozhüyük
- Büyükçamurlu
- Büyükkızılcık
- Çağlayan
- Çamdere
- Çardak
- Cumhuriyet
- Değirmendere
- Doğankonak
- Elmalı
- Ericek
- Esenköy
- Fındıkköy
- Fındıklıkoyak
- Gölpınar
- Göynük
- Gücüksu
- Güldağı
- Güller
- Hacıkodal
- Hacımirza
- Hacıömer
- Harbiye
- Huğtaş
- Kaleboynu
- Kaleköy
- Kamışcık
- Kanlıkavak
- Karaahmet
- Karadut
- Karaömer
- Kavşut
- Kayabaşı
- Kazandere
- Keklikoluk
- Kemalpaşa
- Kınıkkonaz
- Kireçköy
- Kızılöz
- Kömürköy
- Köprübaşı
- Korkmaz
- Küçükçamurlu
- Kurtuluş
- Mahmutbey
- Mehmetbey
- Mevlana
- Mürselköy
- Ortatepe
- Payamburnu
- Pınarbaşı
- Saraycık
- Sırmalı
- Soğukpınar
- Tahirbey
- Taşoluk
- Temürağa
- Tepebaşı
- Tombak
- Yağmurlu
- Yantepe
- Yeni
- Yeniyapan
- Yeşilköy
- Yiricek
- Yoğunoluk
- Yunus Emre

== Climate ==
Göksun has a dry-summer humid continental climate (Köppen: Dsb). Summers are dry, with hot days and cool nights, and winters are cold and snowy.

Climate data for Göksun (1991–2020)
Month	Jan	Feb	Mar	Apr	May	Jun	Jul	Aug	Sep	Oct	Nov	Dec	Year
Mean daily maximum °C (°F)	2.2 (36.0)	4.1 (39.4)	9.4 (48.9)	15.1 (59.2)	20.2 (68.4)	25.5 (77.9)	29.9 (85.8)	30.4 (86.7)	26.2 (79.2)	19.8 (67.6)	11.4 (52.5)	4.6 (40.3)	16.6 (61.9)
Daily mean °C (°F)	−3.3 (26.1)	−1.8 (28.8)	3.5 (38.3)	8.7 (47.7)	13.0 (55.4)	17.5 (63.5)	21.2 (70.2)	21.0 (69.8)	16.5 (61.7)	11.1 (52.0)	4.3 (39.7)	−0.7 (30.7)	9.3 (48.7)
Mean daily minimum °C (°F)	−8.0 (17.6)	−6.9 (19.6)	−1.6 (29.1)	2.6 (36.7)	5.9 (42.6)	9.0 (48.2)	11.5 (52.7)	11.1 (52.0)	7.3 (45.1)	3.7 (38.7)	−1.4 (29.5)	−5.0 (23.0)	2.4 (36.3)
Average precipitation mm (inches)	78.59 (3.09)	61.99 (2.44)	70.39 (2.77)	63.23 (2.49)	55.21 (2.17)	16.76 (0.66)	5.51 (0.22)	6.19 (0.24)	13.32 (0.52)	42.32 (1.67)	61.96 (2.44)	80.74 (3.18)	556.21 (21.90)
Average precipitation days (≥ 1.0 mm)	9.3	8.1	7.6	7.7	8.2	3.6	1.6	1.9	3.0	5.3	6.5	8.8	71.6
Average relative humidity (%)	78.9	75.2	70.0	65.6	64.8	57.5	50.5	53.0	58.4	68.1	71.8	78.6	65.9
Mean monthly sunshine hours	100.7	119.3	172.1	205.9	260.3	318.2	363.9	326.4	281.6	213.6	155.4	92.6	2,610.2
Source: NOAA

== Sources ==
- Kévorkian, Raymond (2011). The Armenian Genocide: A Complete History. Bloomsbury Publishing. ISBN 9780857719300.
- Sinclair, T.A. (1989). Eastern Turkey: An Architectural and Archaeological Survey, Volume II. ISD LLC. ISBN 9781904597735.
