= Koç =

Koç ([kotʃ]) is a Turkish word meaning ram that may refer to:

== Surname ==
- Ahmet Koç, bağlama artist from Turkey
- Ali Yıldırım Koç (born 1967), Turkish businessman
- Anıl Koç (born 1995), Turkish–Belgian footballer
- Atilla Koç (born, 1946), Turkish politician
- Cengiz Koç (born 1977), German heavyweight boxer of Turkish descent
- Ekin Koç (born 1992), Turkish actor
- Filiz Koç (born in 1986), Turkish–German women's footballer, model and sports reporter
- Hakan Koç (born 1980), Turkish freestyle wrestler
- Haluk Koç (born 1954), Turkish politician
- Hüseyin Koç (born 1979), Turkish volleyball player
- İnanç Koç (born 1979), Turkish professional basketball player
- Meryem Koç (born 1996), Turkish women's footballer
- Okan Koç (born 1982), Turkish professional footballer
- Rahmi Koç (born 1930), Turkish businessman
- Serhat Koç (born 1990), Dutch footballer of Turkish descent
- Süleyman Koç (born 1989), Turkish–German footballer
- Vehbi Koç (1901–1996), Turkish businessman
- Mustafa Vehbi Koç (1960–2016), Turkish businessman

== Other uses ==
- Koç family, Turkish dynasty of business people
- Koç Holding, industrial conglomerate in Turkey founded and controlled by the Koç family
- Koç School, private school in Istanbul, Turkey
- Koç University, private university in Istanbul

== See also ==
- Koch (surname)
