= Koç family =

Turkish family

Koç
- Business family
- Current region: Istanbul, Turkey
- Origin: Ankara, Turkey
- Founded: May 1926, 31; 100 years ago
- Founder: Vehbi Koç (1901–1996)
- Titles: Koç Holding; Vehbi Koç Foundation
- Members: Vehbi Koç; Semahat Arsel; Rahmi Koç; Sevgi Gönül; Suna Kıraç; Mustafa Vehbi Koç; Ömer Koç; Ali Koç; İpek Kıraç
- Estate: Count Ostrorog Mansion

The Koç family is a Turkish family of business people founded by Vehbi Koç, one of the wealthiest people in Turkey. His grandchildren, the third generation of the Koç family, today run Turkey's largest group of Corporate group, Koç Holding, the only Turkish company listed on the Fortune Global 500 list. In 2016, the family's wealth was estimated at US$8 billion, ranking them as the wealthiest family in Turkey. According to the Vehbi Koç Foundation, their ancestry can be traced to Haji Bayram Veli.

== Family history ==
=== First generation ===
Vehbi Koç was born on July 20, 1901, in Ankara and died on February 25, 1996, in Istanbul. In 1926, he married Sadberk, his maternal cousin. The first firm he established was called Koçzade Ahmet Vehbi and was registered in 1926 at the Ankara Chamber of Commerce. While working in commerce, he became the local partner of Ford Motor Company and Standard Oil in 1928. When Ankara became the capital of the young Turkish Republic, construction work increased rapidly and Koç began trading in construction materials, building supplies and hardware. Following the establishment of branch offices in Istanbul and Eskişehir in 1938, he merged all these enterprises into a company called Koç Ticaret A.Ş.

Koç's first initiative in the automotive sector eventually turned into a full-scale industry. Following an agreement with the Ford Motor Company in 1959, he set up Ford Otosan. In 1963 Vehbi Koç consolidated all the companies bearing his name under the same roof and founded Koç Holding. This was the start of the holdings era in Turkey and many businessmen followed Koç in the same direction.

Vehbi Koç founded an Eye Bank at the Faculty of Medicine of Ankara University, a Cardiology Institute at the Faculty of Medicine of Istanbul University, and the Vehbi Koç Dormitory at Middle East Technical University. Under the leadership of Vehbi Koç, 205 businesspeople, academics, and intellectuals came together to establish the Turkish Education Foundation (Turkish: Türk Eğitim Vakfı, commonly abbreviated as TEV) in 1967.

Koç School opened in 1988 and Koç University in 1993. He also established the Turkish Family Health and Planning Foundation (Turkish: Türkiye Aile Sağlığı ve Planlaması Vakfı) and functioned as the president of the foundation until his death.

=== Second generation ===
Semahat Sevim Koç, born in 1928 in Ankara, is the eldest child of Vehbi Koç. She graduated from the American College for Girls in Istanbul before studying at the Goethe Institute in Germany. She was married to Dr. Nusret Arsel from 1956 until his death in 2014. Semahat is member of the board directors of Koç Holding and the Vehbi Koç Foundation. She is president of the Semahat Arsel Nursing Education and Research Center.

Rahmi Mustafa Koç, born in 1930 in Ankara, is the second child of Vehbi Koç. He completed his B.A. in Industrial Management at Johns Hopkins University, US, after graduating from Robert College in Istanbul. He served at various managerial posts in the group companies, and in 1984 took over the leadership of the business empire his father had founded. Rahmi married Çiğdem Meseretçioğlu, but the couple ultimately divorced after their three sons were born. In 2003, he transferred his chair to his eldest son Mustafa, and assumed the title of honorary chairman of Koç Holding.

Sevgi Koç, born in 1938, is the third child of Vehbi Koç. She graduated from the American College for Girls in Istanbul and married Erdoğan Gönül, a member of the Koç Holding's board of directors. She was also made a member of the board of directors for both Koç Holding and the Vehbi Koç Foundation. Sevgi also presided over the executive committee of the Sadberk Hanım Museum in Istanbul, and was a columnist in the Turkish newspaper Hürriyet. She died in Istanbul from cancer on September 12, 2003, shortly after her husband.

Suna Koç, born in 1941 and deceased in 2020, was the youngest child of Vehbi Koç. She graduated from American College for Girls in Istanbul, and was then educated at the Boğaziçi University, Istanbul. She was married to İnan Kıraç, a high-ranking executive of the Koç Holding. They have one child. Suna had worked in various posts in the holding, most notably as vice president. She was also a board member of various foundations and educational institutions. Due to her contributions in education, health and social service in Turkey, Suna was awarded the State Distinguished Service Medal by President Süleyman Demirel in 1997. In 1999, the London Business School granted her honorary fellowship for her contributions in leadership at the Koç Holding and in field of children's education in Turkey.

=== Third generation ===
Mustafa Vehbi Koç, born in 1960 in Istanbul, was the eldest son of Rahmi Koç. He died on January 21, 2016, following a heart attack. He was educated in the Lyceum Alpinum Zuoz in Switzerland, and graduated in 1984 from George Washington University, US. After working at various posts, this third generation member of the family was appointed president of Koç Holding in 2003. He was married to Caroline Giraud, the daughter of a Levantine family from İzmir.

Mehmet Ömer Koç, born on March 24, 1962 in Ankara, is the second son of Rahmi Koç. He graduated from Robert College in Istanbul and Millfield School in Somerset, UK. Ömer was educated first at the Georgetown University, Washington D.C., and then obtained his BA in Ancient Greek and his MBA from Columbia University, New York. After working in several posts in the Koç group companies, he is currently chairman of Koç Holding, replacing his brother Mustafa, who died in 2016.

Ali Yıldırım Koç, born on April 2, 1967 in Istanbul, is the youngest son of Rahmi Koç. After finishing high school at Harrow School, London, he received his B.A. in 1989 from Rice University, Houston, Texas, followed by his MBA from Harvard Business School in 1997. After working in various companies in the US and in the Koç Group, he became chief executive of Koç Holding's information technologies group. He married Nevbahar Demirağ. He was the 37th chairman of the Turkish sports club Fenerbahçe SK.

İpek Kıraç, born on November 29, 1984, is the daughter of Suna and İnan Kıraç. She graduated from the Koç School in 2002 and received her degree in Biology from Brown University in 2007. Between 2012 and 2021, she was CEO of Sirena Marine Maritime Industry and Trade Inc. She chairs the board of directors of the Koç School and is on the boards of trustees of Koç University and the Galatasaray Education Foundation, as well as on both the board of directors and board of trustees of the Educational Volunteers Foundation of Turkey (TEGV).

== See also ==
- Rahmi M. Koç Museum
- Koç School
- Koç University
- Vehbi Koç Foundation
- Pera Museum
- Arter
- Meşher
- American Hospital Istanbul
