= Vincent Michael Brown =

English painter (born 1971)

Vincent Brown
- Born: Vincent Michael Brown; 3 December 1971 (age 54); Bristol, England
- Occupation: Portrait Artist Musician Composer
- Writing career
- Notable awards: Holburne Portrait Prize; 2006
- Website: www.vincentbrown.co.uk

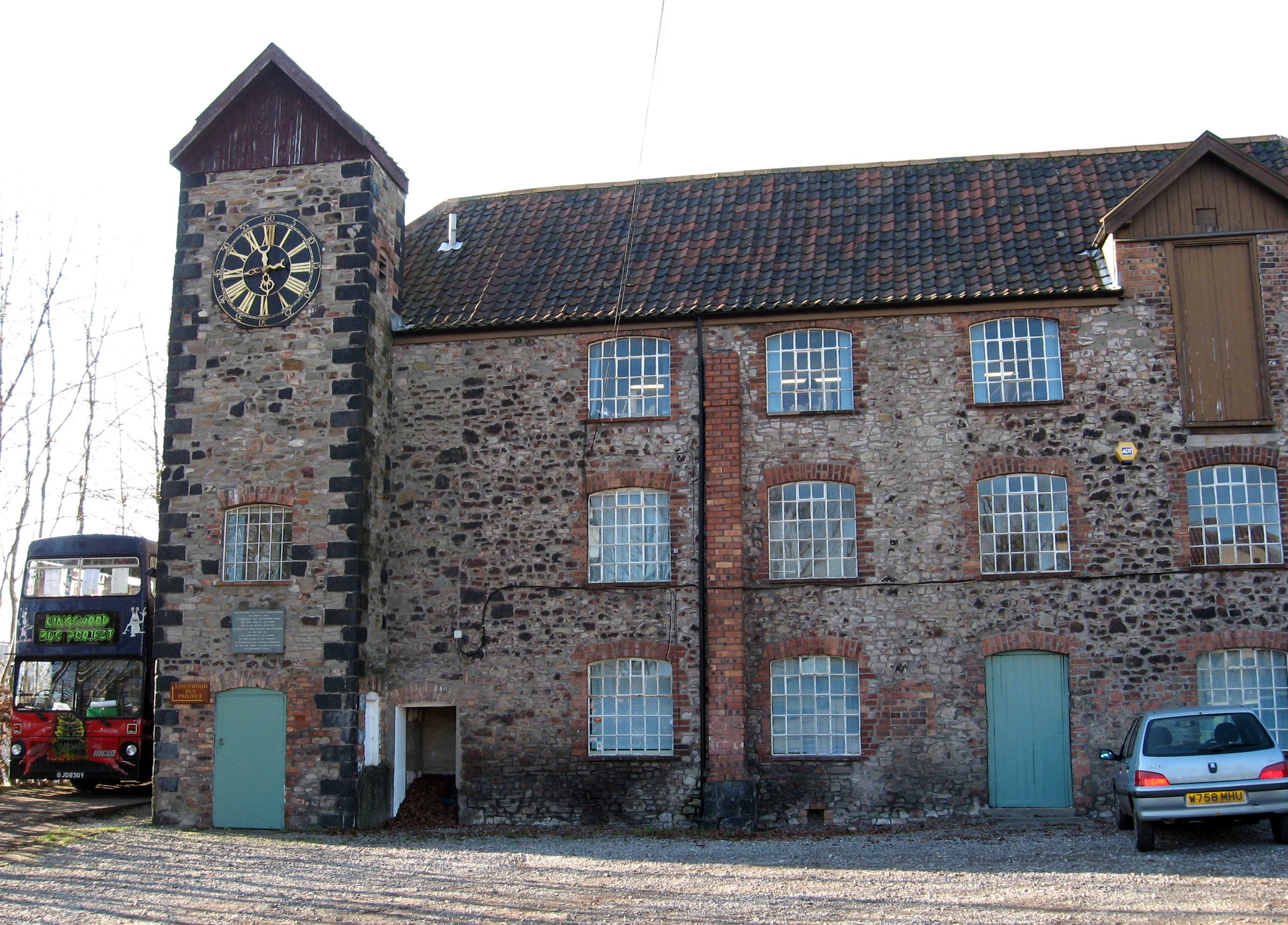
The studio and art school of Vincent Michael Brown at the clock tower in Warmley, Bristol.

Vincent Michael Brown (3 December 1971) is an English artist and portrait painter, composer and musician, and co-founder of Browns' Arts Centre, an art school and studio located at The Clock Tower Association in Warmley, Bristol.

== Early life ==
Vincent Michael Brown was born in Bristol in 1971. He began exhibiting and receiving portrait commissions from the age of eleven, although he did not become a full-time professional artist until 2002. His early paintings and drawings were mainly acrylic or ink studies of family and friends, still a major theme within his work.

Vincent is also a composer, musician and singer/ songwriter, working as a performer from 1988 until 2002.

== Career ==
Vincent worked as an illustrator for a London-based agency and a New York publisher from 2002 to 2004, while also producing portraits in his spare time.

In 2004, a portrait of his father was short-listed for the BP Portrait Awards and featured in an exhibition at the National Portrait Gallery, London. This selection for the exhibition, along with a solo exhibition in Bristol, garnered him significant media attention and helped launch his career as a full-time artist.

A portrait of his parents won the 2006 Holburne Portrait Prize, judged by Rachel Campbell Johnson (Times art critic), Sir Peter Blake(Artist), and Bel Mooney (Author). This win resulted in a portrait commission of the Triple Academy Award-winning directors of Aardman Animations, hailing from his hometown of Bristol, UK. In 2008, the Holburne Museum hosted Vincent's second solo exhibition, showcasing the portrait along with other works.

Vincent's paintings have earned numerous awards and been exhibited in various exhibitions throughout the UK and the world.

Twice, Vincent has been invited as an artist to The Royal Society of Portrait Painters' annual exhibition at the Mall Galleries, London.

In 2020, Vincent was featured on Sky Arts' Portrait Artist of the Year, where he painted and had his work selected by British Actor David Haig.

In 2021, a family portrait by Vincent was shortlisted for the Ruth Borchard Self-Portrait Prize and exhibited at Coventry Cathedral as part of the Capitol of Culture celebrations.

During 2024, two of Vincent's paintings were exhibited at the Arter gallery in Istanbul as part of a curated show of selected works from the collection of influential art collector Ömer Koç. Vincent's works were displayed alongside those of artists such as Picasso, Chagall, Hockney, Howard Hodgkin, Otto Dix, Chuck Close, Andy Warhol, Gustav Klimt, Sarah Lucas, Roy Lichtenstein, Richard Hamilton, Albrect Dürer, Man Ray, Cindy Sherman, and others.

== Exhibitions ==
- SUPPOSE YOU ARE NOT 2024, Arter, ISTANBUL
- Royal Society of Portrait Painters 2022, Mall Galleries, London
- Ruth Borchard Self-Portrait Prize 2021 (Shortlisted Artist)
- Royal West of England Academy of Art 2020
- Portrait Artist of The Year 2020 (Sky Arts Tv Show)
- Royal West of England Academy of Art - Autumn Exhibition 2019
- Royal Institute of Painters in Watercolour (RI) 2018
- Sunday Times Watercolour Competition - Guildford House Gallery 2017
- The Roper Gallery, Bath - 2017
- Royal Society of Portrait Painters (INVITED ARTIST) 2016
- Sunday Times Watercolour Competition - Mall Galleries 2016
- Royal Society of British Artists - 2014
- Cork Street Open - Cork Street London - 2010
- National Portrait Gallery - Portrait Gala 2009
- Painting Aardman - Solo Exhibition - Holburne Museum - 2008
- Royal Society of Portrait Painters (INVITED ARTIST) 2008
- BP Portrait Award 2007
- The Singer Freidlander Sunday Times Award - 2006
- National Portrait Gallery - Portrait Gala 2005
- Painting Exhibition - RWA - 2005
- The Singer Freidlander Sunday Times Award - 2005
- Solo Exhibition - Center Space - Bristol 2004
- BP Portrait Award 2004
- Royal Society of Portrait Painters 2004 - 2016
- The Hunting Art Prizes - 2005
- RWA Open painting exhibition - 2005
- The Singer Freidlander Sunday Times Award - 2004
- Bath Society of Artists - 2004 to 2012
- Royal West of England Academy of Art - Autumn Exhibition 1999 - 2009

== Publications ==
BP Portrait Award 2004 & 2007 National Portrait Gallery (London)

== Awards ==
- (Shortlisted) Ruth Borchard Self-Portrait Prize 2021
- (WINNER) Holburne Portrait Prize 2006
- The St Cuthberts Mill Award
- Excellence in Watercolour 2006 & 2007 Royal West of England Academy
- (Shortlisted) Ruth Borchard Self-Portrait Prize 2021
- (Longlisted) BP Portrait Award 2020
- (Contestant) Sky Arts Portrait Artist of the year 2020
- (Finalist) Sunday Times Watercolour Competition 2016
- (Runner-Up) Jackson's Oil Competition 2016
- (Finalist) Artists and Illustrators Artist of the year 2011
- (WINNER) BFA Best Painting Award - Royal West of England Academy of Art (RWA)
- (WINNER) Excellence in Watercolour Award - RWA 2008
- (WINNER) Consumer Intelligence Watercolour Award - RWA 2007
- (WINNER) Peoples Choice Award - Victoria Gallery 2006

== Important portraits ==
- Sir Simon Alexander Bowes-Lyon
- Nick Park
- Peter Lord
- David Sproxton
- The Right Reverend Abbot David Charlesworth O.S.B
- The Right Reverend Canon Gregory Grant
- David Haig Collum Ward MBE (PAOTY Sky Arts)
- Ömer Koç
- Prof. Val Gibson
- Lady Caroline Bowes Lyon
- David Cobley RP (Artist)
- Anthony Beeson (Time Team Art Historian)
