= Rahmi Koç scandal =

2026 scandal in Turkey

The Rahmi Koç scandal, began in June 2026 after a video circulated on social media of Turkish billionaire, Rahmi Koç, where he made a derogatory joke about Kurdish women, it drew numerous reactions from various groups and led to ethnic tensions, with many Kurds boycotting businesses linked to Koç. Days after the incident several businesses linked to Koç, were shot at, including a bank branch and two automotive sale and rental outlets. As of June 9, more than 10 people have been detained in connection with the attacks.

== Background ==
Mustafa Rahmi Koç is the honorary chairman of Koç Holding, a Turkish company with businesses in energy, automotive, consumer durables, finance, technology, retail, tourism, agriculture, food, and shipbuilding. The Koç Group includes 14 companies. As of June 9, 2026, his estimated net worth is $2.4 billion. His son, Ömer Koç, is currently the chairman.

Just days before the incident, Koç Holding celebrated its 100th anniversary.

In a video recorded on 5 June, at the opening of İzmir American Hospital, that circulated widely on social media, Koç said, “A doctor told a Kurdish woman to undress, and she replied, ‘You undress first, doctor’.” Several people surrounding Koç were seen laughing at the joke, including Binali Yıldırım, a senior figure in the ruling Justice and Development Party (AKP) and Turkey’s last prime minister.

== Backlash ==
Koç later made a public apology through there social media accounts. The message read , "I sincerely apologize for my words, which I did not intend to target anyone. I would like to express my sincere regret." While Rahmi Koç, apologized, Binali Yıldırım reportedly told his close circle, "I didn't understand what was said there. When those around me laughed, I laughed out of politeness. I would never tolerate disrespect towards our Kurdish citizens.”

=== Kurdish response ===
The pro-Kurdish opposition DEM Party said it filed a criminal complaint against Koç for “making sexist remarks about Kurdish women, on the grounds of 'public incitement to hatred and hostility', 'insult' and 'hate and discrimination'." Numerous bar associations have issued statements condemning Rahmi Koç and announced they will file criminal complaints against him, Notably by the Van Bar Association. Pervin Buldan, co-chair of the DEM party, stated on her social media; “Aren’t you ashamed of your age? This is an outrageous disgrace,”. The Islamist Kurdish party Huda-Par was also angered by Koç's statement. The Kurdish women's movement known as the Free Women's Movement (TJA) also condemned KoçIn a statement released on there social media. In Diyarbakır, the TJA protested with a march from Dağkapı Square to the Grand Mosque. Protests also erupted against Binali Yildirim, after cameras showed him laughing at the joke by Koç.

=== Turkish response ===
Following the incident an investigation was announced by Justice minister, Akin Gurlek on X where he also condemned the statement by Koç. AKP Spokesperson Ömer Çelik also issued a statement, condemning Koç's comments, defending Kurdish citizens and women in general. The Far-right MHP party leader Devlet Bahçeli stated that initiating an investigation against Koç was "wrong” and that it was “a joke he made in a friendly conversation” and that the Koç holding has undertaken significant responsibilities in the country's development efforts and investments. A similar approach came from AKP Deputy Chairman Nihat Zeybekci. While criticizing Rahmi Koç's remarks, Zeybekci noted that Koç had apologized and added, "I wish we had 3-5 more Koç Groups in Turkey's economy."

== Attacks ==
June 7 shooting at the Koç Holding’s headquarters.

On June 7, shots were fired at the Otokoç headquarters in Maltepe, Istanbul. Later that evening, another Otokoç sales center was attacked, this time in Antalya. That same night, a Yapı Kredi Bank branch in Sur, Diyarbakır, was also reported to have been attacked by armed assailants. In Diyabakır the incident’s occurred at around 11:30 PM, following reports by bank employees, police teams conducted an investigation at the scene. The branch was temporarily closed. One day after the incident’s, a ATM belonging to Yapı Kredi Bank in the Ofis neighborhood of Yenişehir district was shot at by unidentified person(s). No one was killed or injured in the incident. An armed Kurdish group known as Ertekinler claimed responsibility for the attack. The gunmen allegedly recorded the attack with their phones and shared it on social media. In the footage, one of the attackers stated; "Rahmi Koç, greetings from brother Serdar E. If the disrespect towards Kurdish women continues, these actions in Turkey will not end." As of June 9, more than 10 people have been detained in connection with the attacks. AK Party spokesperson Ömer Çelik, condemned the attacks on his social media. The DEM Party also condemned the attack, stating, "Our stance against all acts of violence that threaten social peace is clear; such attacks are unacceptable."
