= İpek Kıraç =

Turkish businesswoman

- Born: November 29, 1984 (age 41); Istanbul, Turkey
- Education: Koç School
- Alma mater: Brown University (BS, MPH)
- Parents: İnan Kıraç (father); Suna Kıraç (mother)

İpek Kıraç (born November 29, 1984) is a Turkish businesswoman. She has been a member of Koç Holding Board of Directors since 2016.

== Early life ==
She graduated from Koç School in 2002 and from Brown University Department of Biology in 2007. During her undergraduate studies at Brown University, she gained research experience at Cecil B. Day Laboratory for Neuromuscular Research at UMass Medical School led by Robert H. Brown, a leading researcher in ALS. She also gained clinical experience via a summer internship at Istanbul American Hospital’s Department of Physical Medicine and Rehabilitation led by Ender Berker. Kıraç received her Master of Public Health degree from Brown University in 2011.

== Career ==
Between 2012 and 2021, she served as the CEO of Sirena Marine Maritime Industry and Trade Inc. During this period, the company introduced its own luxury sail and motorboat brand and expanded its production activities. Sirena Marine entered the list of Turkey’s 500 largest exporting companies, and its turnover and profitability increased substantially. The company also became a supplier for several defense and automotive projects. She continues to serve as chairwoman of the board of directors.

Kıraç is a member of the board of directors of Vehbi Koç Foundation, Temel Trade and Investment Inc., American Hospital (Moment Health Services Trade Inc.), Zer Central Services Inc., Arçelik Marketing Inc. and Setur Service Touristic Inc.

== Memberships ==
İpek Kıraç is also a founding member of the board of Suna and İnan Kıraç Foundation. She launched Suna’nın Kızları (English: Suna’s Daughters), an education initiative which will be taking a multi-dimensional and holistic approach for creating ecosystems of support that will empower girls to identify and pursue their dreams. She also launched SemtPati (English: NeighborhoodPaws) Foundation working on the welfare of stray animals by using digital technologies and by mobilizing 25,000 registered volunteers around data-based solutions.

In addition, Kıraç continues to work as the chairwoman of the board of directors of Koç School and as a member of the board of trustees of Koç University, Galatasaray Education Foundation and both member of the board and member of the board of trustees of Educational Volunteers Foundation of Turkey (TEGV).
