= Aygaz =

Turkish gas station chain

Aygaz A.Ş.
- Company type: Public
- Traded as: BİST: AYGAZ
- Industry: Energy
- Founded: 1961; 65 years ago
- Founder: Vehbi Koç
- Headquarters: Zincirlikuyu, Mecidiyeköy, Şişli, Istanbul, Turkey
- Area served: Worldwide
- Key people: Rahmi Koç (chairman); Yağız Eyüboğlu (CEO)
- Products: LPG, autogas
- Revenue: ▲US$2.27 billion (2023)
- Net income: ▲US$202 million (2023)
- Total assets: ▲US$1.57 billion (2023)
- Total equity: ▲US$1.24 billion (2023)
- Owner: Koç family
- Number of employees: 1,658
- Subsidiaries: List: Mogaz Akpa Anadoluhisarı Tankercilik Enerji Yatırımları A.Ş. (%20) Aygaz Doğal Gaz AES Entek (%24,81)
- Website: www.aygaz.com.tr

Aygaz A.Ş. is Turkey’s 14th largest industrial organization according to the listing by Istanbul Chamber of Commerce. It is majority-owned by the Koç Holding, and partly floated on the Istanbul Stock Exchange.

Aygaz brings together the energy firms of the Koç Holding outside the oil and refinery sector. Its subsidiary portfolio ranges from LPG trade to electricity and natural gas. Having been the leader of the LPG sector in Turkey since its foundation in 1961, Aygaz manufactures and sells LPG devices in addition to distributing LPG as auto-gas, cylinder gas and bulk gas. Serving customers in 81 provinces with more than 3,800 cylinder gas dealers and auto-gas stations, Aygaz also exports LPG devices to 22 countries in Europe, Africa and the Middle East. Aygaz cylinders are delivered to over 100,000 homes every day, while over one million vehicles travel with Aygaz’s auto-gas product, Aygaz Euro LPG+, every day. With more than 15,000 personnel working at the headquarters, facilities and dealerships.

== Recent activities ==
In 2022, the consolidated sales revenue of Aygaz reached 6,413 million TL and its net profit raised to 465 million TL.

== Subsidiaries and Affiliates ==
- Mogaz
- Akpa
- Aygaz Doğalgaz
- Anadoluhisarı Tankercilik
- AES Entek
- EYAŞ
- United Aygaz LPG Ltd.
