= Suna Kıraç =

Turkish-American businesswoman (1941–2020)

- Born: Suna Koç; 3 June 1941; Keçiören, Ankara, Turkey
- Died: 15 September 2020 (aged 79); American Hospital (Istanbul), Turkey
- Resting place: Zincirlikuyu Cemetery
- Education: Arnavutköy American High School for Girls
- Alma mater: Boğaziçi University (BA)
- Occupation: Businesswoman
- Known for: Heiress of a stake in Koç Holding
- Spouse: İnan Kıraç
- Children: İpek Kıraç
- Parent(s): Vehbi Koç; Sadberk Koç

Suna Koç Kıraç (born Suna Koç; 3 June 1941 – 15 September 2020) was a Turkish businesswoman and a billionaire.

== Early years ==
Suna Koç was born to Vehbi Koç (1901–1996), the wealthiest businessman of Turkey, and his wife Sadberk (1908–1973) on 3 June 1941. She became the vice president of Koç Holding. She married İnan Kıraç, then a high-level executive of Koç Holding. As they were unable to have a biological child, they adopted a four-month old baby girl named İpek in their 15th year of marriage.

== Museum ==
Suna Kıraç and her husband established a foundation for culture and education. The foundation opened the Pera Museum in 2005, which exhibits three valuable art collections of the Kıraç family.

== Awards ==
Suna Kıraç was awarded the State Medal of Distinguished Service by the Turkish Council of Ministers for her contributions to education, health and social services in the country on 23 September 1997. She received the award from President Süleyman Demirel on 27 October 1997. In 2008, she was awarded an honorary doctorate degree from the Boğaziçi University for her contribution to education.

Kıraç received several other honors, including the Directorate General of Foundations Honor Award for Friends of Foundations, an Honorary Fellowship from the London Business School, and the Galatasaray Education Foundation Honor Medal. She held various roles in prominent organizations, serving as a Member of the Board of Directors at the Vehbi Koç Foundation, Chair of the Board of Directors at the Suna and İnan Kıraç Foundation, and trustee at institutions such as Koç University, the Turkish Education Foundation (Turkish: Türk Eğitim Vakfı, commonly abbreviated as TEV), the Turkish Family Health and Planning Foundation, and Robert College. She was also a founding member and Chair of the Board of Directors of the Educational Volunteers Foundation of Turkey.

== Autobiography ==
In 1998, she published an autobiography, in which she wrote about her life, her marriage, how she adopted her daughter İpek, her professional years, her illness and her dreams.

- Ömrümden Uzun İdeallerim Var!, 1998 ("I Have Ideals Longer Than My Life!").

== Illness and death ==
She experienced the first symptoms of her illness shortly after her father's death and her involvement in the family business. In 1996, she suffered aphonia. The next year, her hands began to fall asleep, and one year later, she began to lisp. She was diagnosed in the Houston Methodist Hospital with amyotrophic lateral sclerosis (ALS), a specific disease that causes the death of neurons which control voluntary muscles.

Kıraç was paralyzed throughout her entire body in 2000. She could not make any movements, walk, or talk, and she communicated only through eye movement. When she wanted to express a will, she winked for the right letter on a Turkish alphabet show card.

Kıraç died on 15 September 2020 in American Hospital (Istanbul) at the age of 79. She was interred at Zincirlikuyu Cemetery following a memorial ceremony before the headquarters of Koç Holding and the religious funeral service held at the Divinity mosque of Marmara University.

== See also ==
- Koç family
- List of Turkish billionaires by net worth
