= Cosentino =

Cosentino is an Italian surname, or cosentino may refer to any person, thing or concept from the Italian province of Cosenza, or the language of the region.

Notable people with the surname include:

- Aldo Cosentino (1947–2023), Tunisian-born French amateur boxer and coach
- Antonio Cosentino (artist) (born 1970), Turkish artist
- Antonio Cosentino (sailor) (1919–1993), Italian Olympic sailor
- Bethany Cosentino (born 1986), American singer and songwriter, member of Best Coast and Pocahaunted
- Chris Cosentino, American chef
- Chris Cosentino, American musician, former member of The A-Sides
- Cristina Cosentino (born 1997), Argentine field hockey player
- Curt Cosentino, American musician, member of Polyrock
- Frank Cosentino (born 1937), Canadian football player
- Frank J. Cosentino, American business executive/author, president of Edward Marshall Boehm, Inc.
- Ivan Cosentino, Argentine record producer/publisher, co-founder of Discos Qualiton
- Jerome Cosentino (1931–1997), American politician
- John Cosentino, American movie special effects artist, special effects artist on The Alien Factor, a 1978 film
- Joseph Cosentino, American mobster, an associate of the Lucchese crime family
- Nicola Cosentino (born 1959), Italian politician
- Paul Cosentino (born 1982), stage name Cosentino, Australian magician and illusionist
- Renato Cosentino (1909–1996), Italian Olympic sailor
- Ron Cosentino, American screenwriter/director/producer, screenwriter/director/producer of Fallen Arches, a 1998 film
- Rosario "Saro" Cosentino, Italian songwriter, co-writer of various songs recorded by Franco Battiato
- Rubén Mario Cosentino (1935–2001), better known as Marty Cosens, Argentine singer, actor, television presenter and record producer
- Sam Cosentino (born 1971), Canadian sportscaster
- Seth Cosentino (born 1981), birth name of Seth Gabel, American actor
- Vicente Cosentino (fl. 1949–1969), Argentine cinematographer
- Vincenzo Cosentino (born 1982), Italian filmmaker

== See also ==
- Castiglione Cosentino, a town in Calabria, Italy
- Cosenza (surname)
