= Rahmi Koç =

Turkish businessman (born 1930)

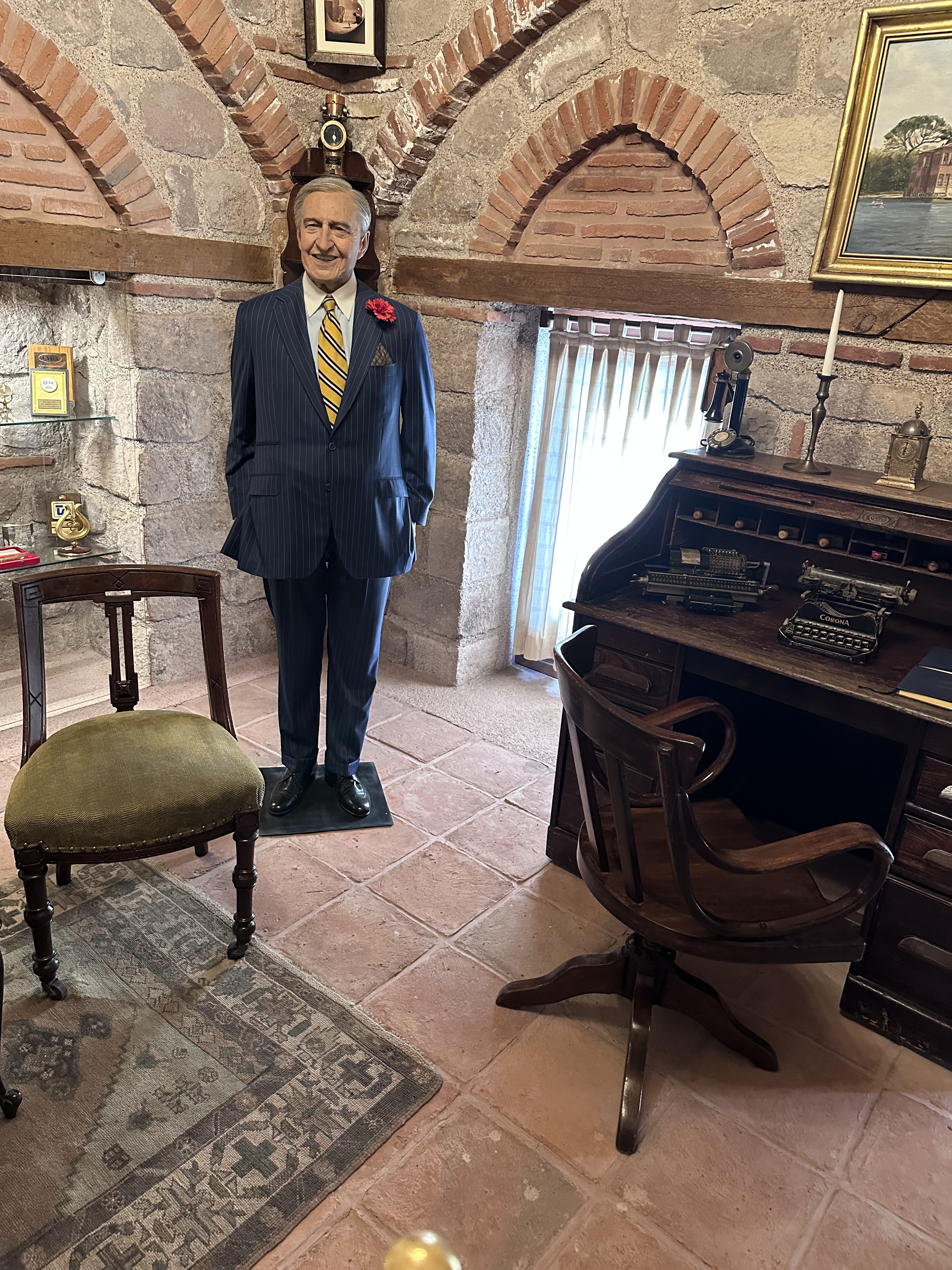
- Koç in 2025
- Born: Mustafa Rahmi Koç; 9 October 1930 (age 95); Ankara, Turkey
- Education: Johns Hopkins University (BA)
- Occupation: Businessman
- Known for: Honorary President of Koç Holding
- Children: Mustafa, Ömer, and Ali
- Parents: Vehbi Koç (father); Sadberk Koç (mother)
- Relatives: Semahat Arsel (sister); Sevgi Gönül (sister); Suna Kıraç (sister)
- Website: koc.com.tr/about-us/board-of-directors/rahmi-m-koc

Mustafa Rahmi Koç (born 9 October 1930) is a Turkish businessman. In 2016, Forbes ranked him No. 906 richest person in the world with a net worth of US$2.6 billion. In 2013, Koç was the single highest taxpayer in Turkey, totalling 37.5 million lira.

== Early life and education ==
Koç was born on 9 October 1930, one of four children born to Vehbi Koç. He attended high school at Robert College in Istanbul after his primary education in Ankara. Rahmi Koç then studied at the Johns Hopkins University and received a Bachelor of Arts in industrial management.

== Career ==
Following his military service, Koç started actively working for the Koç Group in 1958, joining the Otokoç Company in Ankara. In 1960, he transferred to Koç Ticaret, which represented the Koç Group in Ankara. Following the relocation of the Koç Holding headquarters from Ankara to Istanbul in 1964, which was established a year earlier, he became general coordinator of Koç Holding. and moved to Istanbul.

In 1970, Koç became chairman of the executive committee and in 1975 deputy chairman of the board of management. Rahmi Koç was appointed chairman of the Koç Holding management committee in 1980. His father transferred his chairmanship Koç on 30 March 1984. He retired from this duty on 4 April 2003, transferring his chair to his eldest son, Mustafa Vehbi. He is the honorary chairman of the Koç Holding.

A visit to Henry Ford Museum in Michigan inspired Koç to create the Rahmi M. Koç Museum in Istanbul, which is dedicated to the history of transport, industry and communications exhibiting trains, submarines and autos.

In 2013, Koç bought the Merrill-Stevens Drydock & Repair Co., Florida's oldest boatyard, and renamed it RMK Merrill-Stevens. He is the owner of a 171-foot yacht, the Nazenin V.

== Personal life ==
Koç is a fan and financial supporter of the football club Beşiktaş J.K. He has three sons: Mustafa, Ömer, and Ali, from his previous marriage to Çiğdem Simavi. In 2026, a video of him making a derogatory joke about Kurdish women circulated, causing a rise in ethnic tensions.

== mandates and memberships ==
- Chairman of the International Chamber of Commerce (1995–1996)
- Member of the Rotary Club
- Member of the Istanbul Open Sea Yacht Club
- Member of the New York Yacht Club
- Honorary Member of the Board of Trustees of Metropolitan Museum of Art
- Vice Chairman of the Board of Trustees of Vehbi Koç Foundation
- Honorary Chairman of the Board of Trustees of Koç University
- Founder and Chairman of the Board of Directors of the Rahmi M. Koç Museum
- Chairman of the Board of Directors of the American Hospital Istanbul
- Honorary Chairman of the Advisory Board of the Turkish Industry and Business Association
- Founding Chairman of the Global Relations Forum
- Former Member of the Allianz International Advisory Board
- Former Member of the JPMorgan Chase International Council
- Former Member of the International Advisory Board of the Council on Foreign Relations

== Honorary doctorates ==
Koç received honorary doctorates from the following universities:

- Johns Hopkins University, Baltimore, Maryland (1998)
- Anadolu University, Eskişehir (1998)
- Ege University, İzmir (1999)
- Bilkent University, Ankara (1999)
- Ovidius University, Constanţa (2001)
- Adnan Menderes University, Aydın (2008)

== Awards ==
Koç was awarded by various institutions as below:

- Germany: Order of Merit of the Federal Republic of Germany, 1982
- Turkey: State Medal of Distinguished Service, 1997
- Italy: Order of Merit of the Italian Republic, 2001
- Austria: Order of Merit of the Austrian Government, 2003
- Great Britain: Commander of the Most Excellent Order of the British Empire, 2011
- France: National Order of the Legion of Honour, 2015
- World Monuments Fund: Hadrian Award, 2007
- Carnegie Medal of Philanthropy, 2009
- BNP Paribas: BNP Paribas Philanthropy Award, 2011
- Metropolitan Museum of Art: Outstanding Service Award in Decorative Arts, 2016
- Foreign Policy Association: Foreign Policy Association Medal, 2019

== See also ==
- The World's Billionaires
