= Fatma Bucak =

Turkish contemporary artist

- Born: 1984; Turkey
- Education: Royal College of Art, Accademia Albertina
- Known for: Photography, Performance Art, Video, Installation, Sculpture, Printmaking

Fatma Bucak (born 1984) is an artist who lives and works in London and Istanbul.

== Biography ==
She was born in Turkey, to a Kurdish family. She works in a variety of media, including photography, performance, sound, multimedia, and video installation, and focuses on themes of political identity, historical memory, and gender. In 2019, she was named one of the Royal Photographic Society's ‘Hundred Heroines’, recognizing the achievements of women in the arts and photography.

Bucak has exhibited at Venice Biennale, the Jewish Museum New York, and the Museum of Contemporary Art Toronto. Her work is held in the permanent collections of Fondazione Mario Merz, Arter, MAMbo, the Civic Gallery of Modena, and the Unicredit Art Collection. In 2024, she was a fellow at the American Academy in Rome. Bucak has also been artist-in-resident at the Italian Academy for Advanced Studies in America at Columbia University, and at ISCP in Brooklyn, New York. Bucak directed the 2011 documentary film Almost Married, which premiered at the International Documentary Film Festival in Amsterdam.

== Solo exhibitions ==
- While the Dust Quickly Falls at Kunsthaus Dresden, Germany (2022).
- In Prestissimo at Peola Simondi Contemporary Art, Turin, Italy (2022)
- Acts of Erasure at Museum of Contemporary Art Toronto Canada, Canada (2020)
- A Colossus on Clay Feet at the Italian Cultural Institute, New York (2019)
- So as to Find the Strength to See at Fondazione Mario Merz, Turin, Italy (2018)
- So as to Find the Strength to See at Galleria d'Arte Moderna Palermo, Italy (2018)
- Damascus Rose at Harpe 45, Lausanne, Switzerland (2017)
- Scouring the Press at Pi Artworks, London, United Kingdom (2017)
- And Men Turned Their Faces Form There at David Winton Bell Gallery, Providence, United States (2016)
- Suggested Place for You to See it at Pori Art Museum, Finland (2016)
- Over a Line Darkly at Artpace, San Antonio, United States (2015)
- I must say a word about fear at Castello di Rivoli, Turin, Italy (2014)
- Yet Another Story about the Fall at Arter Contemporary Art Museum, Istanbul, Turkey (2013)

== Group Exhibitions and Biennials ==
- Pinchuk Art Center, Kyiv (2024)
- Palazzo Esposizioni, Rome (2024)
- MAMAC, Nice 2022
- Z33, Hasselt (2021)
- Art Basel - Hong Kong, 2020
- Gothenburg International Biennial for Contemporary Art, 2017
- The Jewish Museum, New York, 2015
- The Ryder Projects, London, 2015
- The Institute of Contemporary Arts, London, 2013
- 54th Venice Biennale, 2011
- The International Festival of Non-Fiction Film, Museum of Modern Art, New York, 2011

== Awards ==
Bucak won the illy Present Future Award at Artissima 2013, and the Tosseti Value Prize for Photography in 2021. In 2024, she was awarded the Novo Nordisk Foundation Artistic Research Grant.

== Books ==
- While the Dust Quickly Falls (published by Mousse, 2023) ISBN 9788867495474
- So as to Find the Strength to See (published by Hopeful Monster, Turin, April 2018) ISBN 978-88-7757-270-7
- I Must Say a Word about Fear (published by Castello di Rivoli, 2017)
- Yet Another Story About the Fall (published by Arter, 2013) ISBN 9789756959770
