= Antonio Cosentino =

Antonio Cosentino may refer to:

- Antonio Cosentino (artist) (born 1970), Turkish artist
- Antonio Cosentino (sailor) (1919–1993), Italian Olympic sailor
