= Opet =

Turkish petroleum company

- Company type: Private
- Founded: 1992; 34 years ago
- Founder: Fikret Öztürk; Nurten Öztürk
- Headquarters: Provincial Road 34-12 No: 4A, Esatpaşa, Ataşehir Istanbul 34746
- Number of locations: 1800 stations
- Area served: Turkey
- Revenue: ▲$9.58 billion (2023)
- Operating income: ▲$351 million (2023)
- Net income: ▲$90 million (2023)
- Total assets: ▲$1.92 billion (2023)
- Total equity: ▲$734 million (2023)
- Owners: Öztürk family Koç family
- Number of employees: 1000+ (2020)
- Website: opet.com.tr

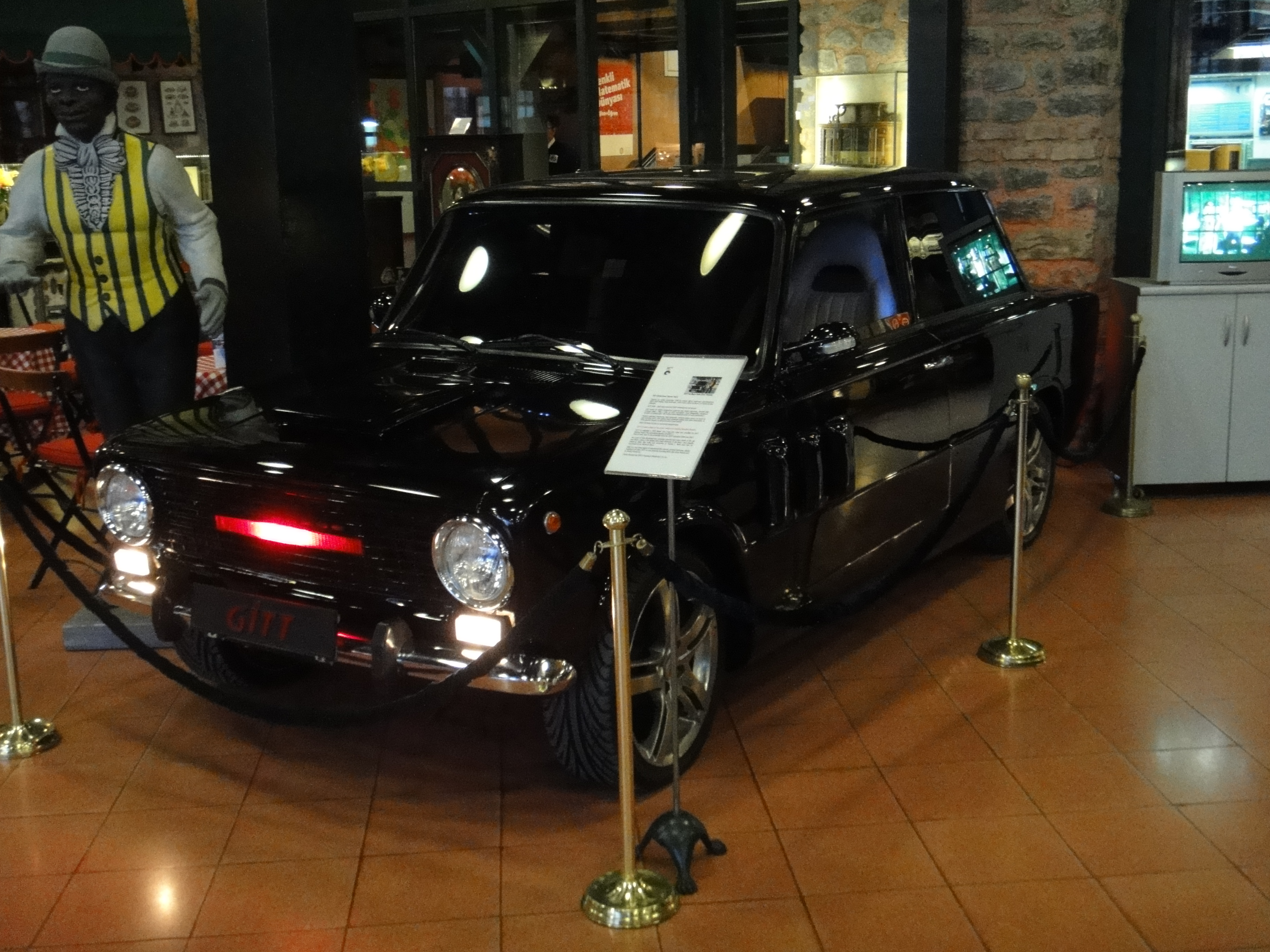
"G.I.T.T.", Opet's "K.I.T.T." knock-off used in its 2006–07 advertising campaigns

Opet is a Turkish petroleum company engaged in the sale of commercial and industrial fuels, mineral oils, retail sales, warehousing and international sales. Opet Petroleum’s roots date back to the fuel distribution company "Ozturk Petrol" founded by Öztürk family.

Having a 50% partnership with Koç Holding Energy Group as of the end of 2002, Opet has focused on infrastructure investments since its inception. The company's warehousing capacity has reached 1.076.318 cubic meters as of 2010. Opet is the first firm ever to have brought 98 octane unleaded fuel to Turkey and introduced Ultra Euro Diesel fuel to Turkish consumers before it was launched in the European market. As the 2nd largest, fuel-oil distribution company in Turkey, Opet has more than 1500 gas stations throughout the country, including those under its SUNPET brand.

As of 2015, Opet has received the 'best in customer satisfaction' award for 10 consecutive years.

== Turkish Opet Aviation Fuels ==
THY Opet was founded in 2009 as a 50–50 partnership between Turkish Airlines and Opet. The company operates in the aircraft fuel storage and refueling business. As of 2013, Fortune 500 Turkey ranked Turkish Opet as the 25th largest company in the country.
