= Josephine Powell =

American photographer, traveller and collector

Josephine Powell (May 15, 1919 – January 19, 2007) was an American photographer, traveller, and a collector of Anatolian ethnographic objects and textiles.

== Education ==
Josephine Powell was born in New York City into a well-to-do family. Powell attended Cornell University, where she earned a BA in 1941. She also attended the New York School of Social Work at Columbia University where she received her Master's degree in 1945. After her graduation, Powell left the United States to start working for the International Refugee Organization (IRO).

== Travels ==
First she worked in Tanganyika, and later in Munich, where she purchased two cameras at the PX: a Leica and a Rolleiflex. After, for many years, Josephine Powell was based in Rome. Initially she regarded these cameras as works of art; after two years she started taking amateur photographs and developed a talent for photography. Her curiosity to learn more about the interesting things she trained her lens on led to an unexpected career as an architectural photographer.

From 1952 to 1975, Powell travelled extensively by car, horse, alone or accompanied by her dog. In many regions, she took photographs of local monuments, of archaeology, of historical and ethnographical subjects and of museum collections. She visited and documented Afghanistan, North Africa, Greece, Kashmir, India, Iran, Italy, Nepal, East and West Pakistan, Russia, Turkey, and Yugoslavia. During these travels, she also collected objects that later became part of various museum collections, such as the Wereldmuseum in Rotterdam and the Tropenmuseum in Amsterdam, the Netherlands. Her photographs would appear in more than 150 books and scientific publications. Several of her architectural photographs appear in Thames & Hudson's landmark survey Architecture of the Islamic World and Islamic Art, Literature, and Culture.

Powell relocated to Istanbul in 1973. After getting an assignment from Thames & Hudson for a proposed book on Turkish kilims, Powell immersed herself in Anatolian kilims and the people who made them. For years, she followed semi-nomadic Anatolians in her VW Caravan, documenting their daily lives, with especial attention to their manufacture of textiles. She also documented kilims and other textiles she found in villages and village mosques. She also, with Harald Böhmer, researched and studied the natural dyes used to produce the colors in antique textiles. Together, in Turkey's Aegean region, they set up the DOBAG Carpet Initiative of weavers, using natural dyes and traditional weaving techniques to produce new carpets, engaging a younger generation in the traditions of carpet weaving, and opening markets for their work.

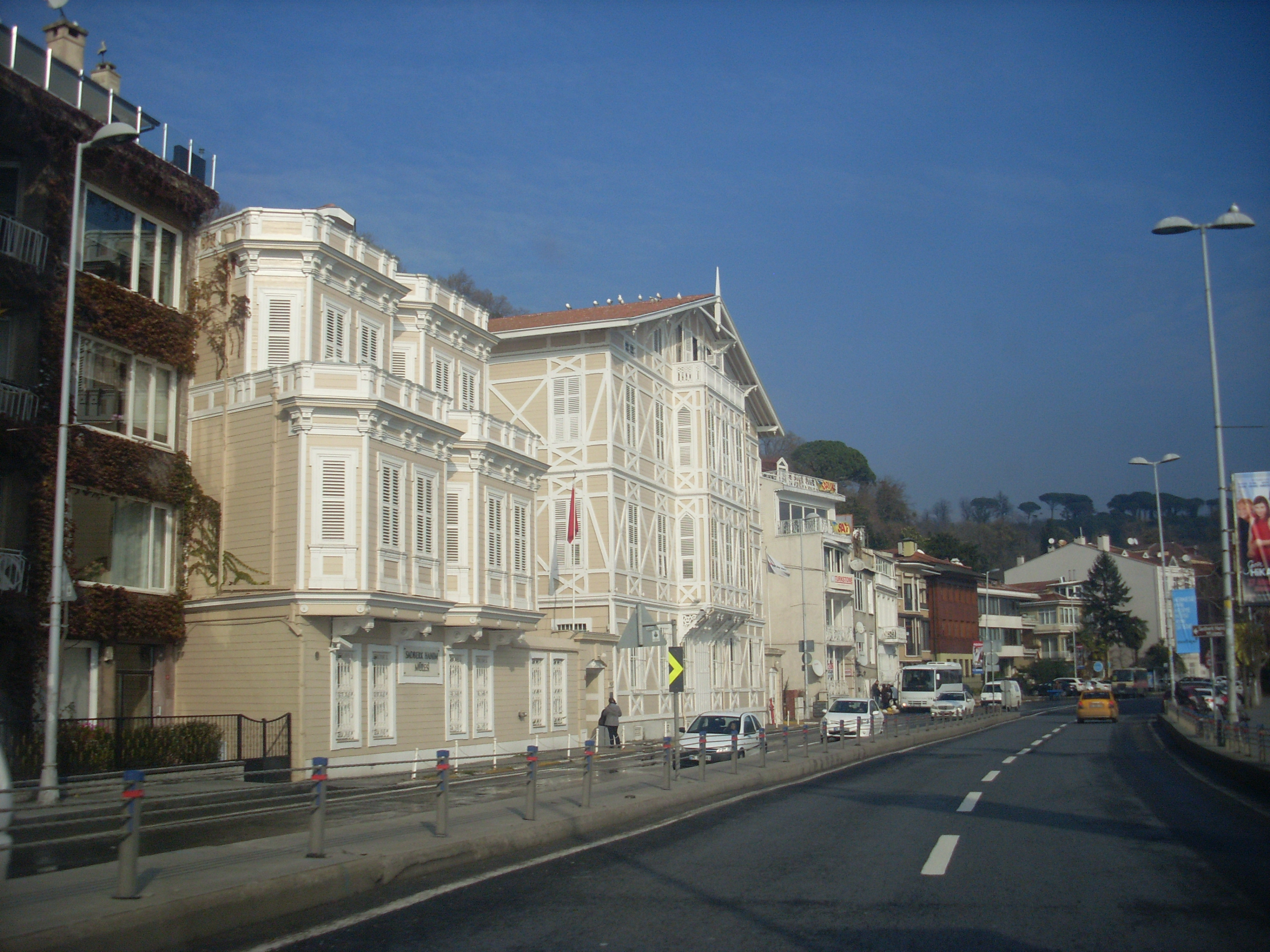
Sadberk Hanım Museum in Büyükdere, Sarıyer

Shortly before her death in January 2007, much of her Turkish collection of textiles and artifacts was donated to the Vehbi Koç Foundation. Tens of thousands of Powell's photographs and associated field notes were also part of her willed donation to the Koç Foundation, and now are part of Koç University's Research Center for Anatolian Civilizations. Among others, long-time friend and aide Brigitte Sommer was instrumental in helping Koç University properly digitalize Powell's collection. Powell's artifacts and textiles are now part of the Sadberk Hanım Museum collection in Büyükdere, Istanbul. Other photographs (about 20,000) of ethnographic interest from her travels from 1951 to 1975 are at Harvard University, which she donated in 2002 to the Fine Arts Library at Harvard. Photographs attributed to Powell are also held in the Conway Library at The Courtauld Institute of Art whose archive, primarily of architectural images, is being digitised under the wider Courtauld Connects programme.

Josephine Powell died at home in Istanbul on January 19, 2007. She was 87. She is buried in the Feriköy Protestant Cemetery in Istanbul.

== Exhibitions ==
- 2012: "What Josephine Saw", the opening exhibit, curated by Kimberly Hart, at Koc University’s Research Center for Anatolian Civilizations, Istiklal Caddesi, Istanbul. It included rare video of Ms. Powell in a 2006 interview by the Istanbul-based journalist Andrew Finkel on behalf of the Textile Museum in Washington.

== Publications ==
=== Writings by Powell ===
- H. Böhmer, with J. Powell and S. Atlıhan: Nomads in Anatolia. Encounters with a Vanishing Culture. Ganderkesee, Remhöb, 2008. Transl. of: Nomaden in Anatolien. ISBN 978-3-936713-03-9
- G. Mandersloot, J. Powell & R. Bolland Firozkohi: Een Afghaans reisjournaal. Rotterdam, Museum voor Land- en Volkenkunde, 1971. No ISBN

=== Monographs on Powell ===
- K. Hart: What Josephine Saw. Twentieth Century Photographic Visions of Rural Anatolia. Istanbul, Koç University Press, 2012. ISBN 978-6056257599
- J. Vos: Josephine Powell (1919-2007). Traveller, Photographer, Collector in the Muslim World. Amsterdam, KIT Publishers, 2008. ISBN 978-90-6832-698-7
- K. Hart: Giving Back the Colours. Josephine Powell Collection. Istanbul, Vehbi Koc Foundation and Sadberk Hanim Museum, 2007. ISBN 978-9756959183
- K. Hart: Josephine Powell Collection. Kilim Ornekleri: Examples from Kilims. Istanbul, JP Morgan Chase Bank, Vehbi Koç Foundation and Sadberk Hanim Museum, 2007. ISBN 9756959193
