= Mustafa Aydın =

Turkish Professor (born 1956)

- Born: 1966 (age 59–60); Trabzon, Turkey
- Citizenship: Turkish

Academic background
- Education: Faculty of Political Science, Ankara University (BA); University of Lancaster (MA, PhD)

Academic work
- Institutions: Kadir Has University; International Relations Council of Turkey (UIK)

Mustafa Aydın is a Turkish academic, professor of international relations, writer, columnist, TV commentator and public intellectual. He served as the rector of Kadir Has University, İstanbul, Turkey between 2010 and 2018; and currently is the President of the International Relations Council of Turkey (UIK) .

== Education ==
He was born in Trabzon on the Black Sea coast of Turkey on 15 September 1967 and grew up in Ankara. He graduated from the Department of International Relations, Faculty of Political Science, Ankara University in 1988. He did a master's degree in the field of International Relations and Strategic Studies in 1991 and his PhD in 1994 at Lancaster University in England.

== Career ==
Working as an academic member at the Faculty of Political Science, Ankara University between 1995 and 2005, Aydın assumed the title of associate professor in 1999 and the full professor in 2005, and served as the founding-chair of the program on Global and Regional Studies.

He later held positions as the Head of the Department of International Relations at the TOBB University of Economics and Technology between 2005 and 2010; Director of International Policy Research Institute (TEPAV-IPRI, Ankara) between 2005 and 2011; Co-Coordinator of the International Commission on the Black Sea; member of the Economy and Foreign Policy Study Group of the President's Office; Board Member of the strategic research centers of both the Turkish Ministry of Foreign Affairs and Turkish Armed Forces; Deputy Chairperson of the International Commission of Eminent Persons on the Caucasus and Caspian (2007-2008); Alexander S. Onassis Fellow at the University of Athens (2003); Research Fellow at the EU Institute for Security Studies, Paris (2003); Fulbright Scholar at the John F. Kennedy School of Government, Harvard University (2002); and UNESCO Fellow at the Richardson Institute for Peace Studies, UK (1999).

== Affiliations and memberships ==
He is an elected member of European Academy of Sciences and Art; elected member of the Senate of the Euro-Mediterranean University; member of the Governing Council of the World Council for Middle Eastern Studies (WOCMES), OECD International Management of Higher Education Program, European Leadership Network, Global Relations Forum, and International Studies Association.

== Editing and writing ==
He is the owner and editor-in-chief of the Journal of International Relations (Turkish: Uluslararası İlişkiler), and writes weekly columns for the Hürriyet Daily News.

== Selected publications ==
Aydın's areas of interest are International Politics, Foreign Policy Analysis, security issues related to Central Asia, Caucasus, the Black Sea and the Middle East, as well as Turkish foreign and security policies. Some of his works includes:

- The Levant: Search for a Regional Order (2018)
- Special Issue on Turkish Foreign Policy, Uluslararasi Iliskiler (International Relations), 2016
- A 2020 Vision for the Black Sea Region (With Dimitrios Triantaphyllou)
- Non-Traditional Security Threats and Regional Cooperation in the Southern Caucasus (ed. 2011)
- Central Asia in Global Politics (in Turkish, 2004)
- Europe’s Next Shore; Black Sea After the Enlargement (2004)
- Turkish Foreign Policy; Framework and Analysis (2005)
- International Security Today; Understanding Change and Debating Security (ed. with K. Ifantis, 2006)
- Turkish Foreign and Security Policy (ed. 2006)
- Regional In/security: Redefining Threats and Responses (ed. 2007)
- Turkey’s Eurasian Adventure (in Turkish, 2008)
- Levantine Challenges on Turkish Foreign Policy (with Cihan Dizdaroğlu, 2018)
- Türkiye’de Uluslararası İlişkiler Akademisyenleri ve Alana Yönelik Yaklaşımları Üzerine Bir İnceleme: TRIP 2014 Sonuçları (with Fulya Hisarlıoğlu and Korhan Yazgan, 2016)
