= Turkish Union of Clubs =

Kulüpler Birliği
- Founded: 2000
- Type: Sports association
- Headquarters: Istanbul, Turkey
- Region served: Turkey
- Products: Süper Lig
- Members: 18 clubs
- President: Ertuğrul Doğan
- Parent organization: Turkish Football Federation (TFF)
- Website: www.kuluplerbirligi.org

The Turkish Super League Professional Football Clubs Foundation (Turkish: Türkiye Süper Lig Profesyonel Futbol Kulüpleri Vakfı), commonly known as Union of Clubs (Turkish: Kulüpler Birliği), is a body representing the interests of professional association football clubs in Süper Lig. The organisation was founded in 2000. The organization became a member of the European Leagues in 2010 and the World Leagues Forum in 2019. The current president is Ertuğrul Doğan, who was elected to the post on 29 July 2025.

== Sponsorships ==
- Avis
- Petrol Ofisi
- InStat
- Socios.com
- Scouthub

== Presidential history ==
Years	Nationality	Name
2000–2002	(Turkey)	İlhan Cavcav
2002–2004	(Turkey)	Cemal Aydın
2004–2005	(Turkey)	İlhan Cavcav
2005–2008	(Turkey)	Özhan Canaydın
2008–2011	(Turkey)	Aziz Yıldırım
2011–2012	(Turkey)	Yıldırım Demirören
2012–2013	(Turkey)	Halil Ünal
2013–2014	(Turkey)	İlhan Cavcav
2014–2017	(Turkey)	Göksel Gümüşdağ
2017–2018	(Turkey)	Dursun Özbek
2018–2019	(Turkey)	Fikret Orman
2019–2021	(Turkey)	Mehmet Sepil
2021	(Turkey)	Ahmet Nur Çebi
2021–2022	(Turkey)	Ahmet Ağaoğlu
2022–2025	(Turkey)	Ali Koç
2025–	(Turkey)	Ertuğrul Doğan
