= Antonio Cosentino (artist) =

Turkish artist

Antonio Cosentino (born 1970) is a Turkish contemporary artist of Italian origin living and working in Istanbul. Primarily a painter, Cosentino's work also encompasses sculpture, installation, writing and photography.

== Education ==
Graduated from the Painting Department of Mimar Sinan University, Istanbul, Faculty of Fine Arts in 1994.

== Work ==
Cosentino's paintings are characterized by the vibrancy of colors and textures, "suffused with a sense of movement, driven by plot and character". Often engaged in storytelling across multiple media, Cosentino has focused on the subcultures and urban development in the city of Istanbul where he lives.

Cosentino was among the three founders of the artists' initiative Hafriyat in 1996, together with Hakan Gürsoytrak and Mustafa Pancar in an effort to break free from the rigidity and conservatism of the art establishment. In the next decade, the collective became a prominent actor in the Istanbul art scene with self-organized and politically engaged exhibitions showcasing a variety of artists' works. Between 2007 and 2009, the collective permanently occupied a space in Karakoy neighbourhood.

Artist and critic Pınar Öğrenci describes Antonio Cosentino's art as follows: "While the shifting character of highbrow and low-brow art was being discussed in the 90s contemporary art milieus, Cosentino and his artist friends undertook, as it were, the archaeology of a gaze which brought subculture into question. It is from this period on that Cosentino’s painting incorporated materials from the visual culture of our geography without letting one dominate the others: panels, signboards, wrappings and ceramic tiles (...) Cosentino’s mobile and ludic setup once again reminds us of the typical obliviousness of modernity, by suggesting concepts such as the fleetingness of megacities and urban architecture, the loss of human scale and localness, the superhuman speed and even consumption."

Cosentino's works are part of major collections including Istanbul Museum of Modern Art, Vehbi Koç Foundation Contemporary Art Collection, Odunpazari Modern Museum.

== Solo exhibitions ==
- 2018 "Summer was a Beautiful Day", Zilberman Gallery, Berlin, Germany
- 2016 "boxes of cigarettes and whisky all over the sea, feråre, my love", Zilberman Gallery, Istanbul, Turkey
- 2015 "Mom I’m going out to pour some concrete, with Memed Erdener", Studio X, Istanbul Turkey
- 2015 "Escape from Marmara", Salt Ulus, Ankara, Turkey
- 2015 "Painting Exhibition", Nurol Art Gallery, Ankara, Turkey
- 2013 "Tin City, Karaköy Külah, Istanbul", Turkey2011 "Time Tunnel" Gallery Kullukcu, München, Germany
- 2008 "Picture Book of History and Stuff " Pi Artworks, Istanbul, Turkey
- 2007 "Çimentofayansavize" Evin Art Gallery, Istanbul, Turkey
- 2005 "Sisli – Yesilkoy", Evin Art Gallery, Istanbul, Turkey
- 2004 "Istanbul 2003-Concrete Sea", Evin Art Gallery, Istanbul, Turkey

== Group exhibitions ==
- 2017: For Rent, For Sale, Protocinema, Istanbul, Turkey
- 2016: Istanbul, Passion, Joy, Fury, curator: Hou Hanru, The National Museum of XXI Century Arts MAXXI, Roma, Italy
- 2015: Every Inclusion Is an Exclusion of Other Possibilities, Salt Beyoğlu, Istanbul, Turkey
- 2015: 2nd Kyiv Biennial, The School of Kyiv, Kyiv, Ukraine
- 2015: 3rd Mardin Biennial: Mythologies, Mardin, Turkey
- 2013: Unrest of Form. Imagining The Political Subject, Wiener Festwochen, Vienna, Austria
- 2010: "Arter. Second Exhibition"
- 2010: "Hafriyat. Spare Time. Great Work."
- 2010: "Tactics of Invisibility", Arter Istanbul, TBA 21 Vienna, Tanas Berlin
- 2009: "Istanbul Next Wave" Martin-Gropius-Bau, Berlin, Germany
- 2008: "Becoming Istanbul "
