= Ömer Koç =

Turkish businessman

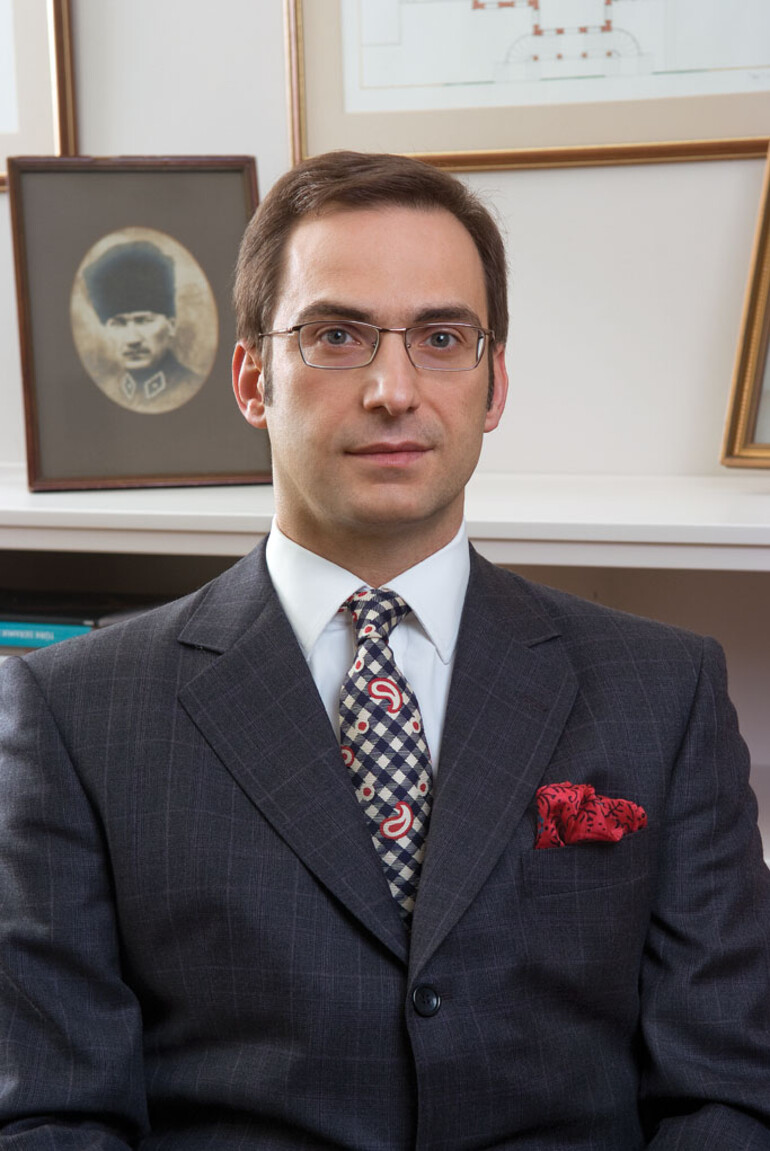
- Official portrait, 2016
- Born: Mehmet Ömer Koç; 24 March 1962 (age 64); Ankara, Turkey
- Education: Robert College; Millfield
- Alma mater: Columbia College (BA); Columbia Business School (MBA)
- Occupation: Businessman
- Known for: Chairman of Koç Holding
- Parent: Rahmi Koç
- Relatives: Mustafa Koç (brother); Ali Koç (brother)
- Website: Official Website

Mehmet Ömer Koç (born 24 March 1962) is a Turkish businessman, art collector, and chairman of Koç Holding. In 2013 Forbes estimated his net worth at US$1.1 billion.

== Early life ==
Koç was born on 24 March 1962 in Ankara, Turkey. A third generation of the Koç family, he is the second son of Rahmi Koç and grandson of Vehbi Koç, founder of Koç Holding. He graduated from Robert College in Istanbul, attended Millfield School in England, studied at Georgetown University before graduating from Columbia College in 1985 with a bachelor's degree in Ancient Greek. He obtained his MBA from Columbia Business School in 1989.

== Career ==
Koç began his business career working at Kofisa Trading Company in Geneva, Switzerland. He joined the family business in 1992 as a finance coordinator and was vice president and president of the Energy Group. He became a member of the board of directors in 2004 and vice chairman in 2008. Shortly after his brother, Mustafa Vehbi Koç, died after a heart attack in 2016, Koç was elected chairman of Koç Holding, Turkey's largest company, in 2016. The company's output contributes nearly ten percent of Turkey's total GDP and is the only Turkish company on the Fortune 500 list. He is also chairman of Tüpraş, the largest oil refiner and industrial company in the country. He is chairman of the board of trustees of Koç University. As of January 2018, Koc owns 0.74% of Koç Holding.

He sits on the steering committee of the Bilderberg Meeting. Koç is chairman of the board of trustees at the Turkish Education Foundation (Turkish: Türk Eğitim Vakfı, commonly abbreviated as TEV).

== Art collection ==
Not much of Koç's personal life is known as he shies away from the public and media. He lives in London and is known for his fondness for both contemporary and classical art. He is a sponsor of the Istanbul Biennial and Turkey's pavilion at the Venice Biennale. He established the nonprofit art space Arter in 2010. For his sponsorship of Turkey's contemporary art scene, he was named by ArtReview as of the "100 Most influential people in 2016 in the contemporary artworld." He also maintains an interest in Ottoman art, and has a large Iznik pottery collection. He is reported to have the finest private collection of objects and books about Ottoman history in the world.
