= Cosenza (surname) =

Cosenza is an Italian surname. Notable people with the surname include:

- Arthur Cosenza (1924 – 2005), American impresario, stage director, and baritone of Italian heritage
- Cesare Cosenza (born 1960), Swiss retired footballer

== See also ==
- Cosentino
- Cosenza
