= Semahat Arsel =

Turkish billionaire businesswoman (born 1928)

Semahat Sevim Arsel
- Born: Semahat Sevim; 8 September 1928 (age 98); Ankara, Turkey
- Education: American College for Girls
- Known for: Director of Koç Holding
- Spouse: Nusret Arsel (deceased)
- Parent(s): Vehbi Koç; Sadberk Koç

Semahat Sevim Arsel (born 8 September 1928) is a Turkish billionaire businesswoman. She is a director of Koç Holding, the largest industrial conglomerate in Turkey, and the eldest child of its founder, Vehbi Koç (1901–1996). She owns 6.15% of the family business. As of August 2022, her net worth was estimated at US$1.6 billion.

== Early life ==
Arsel was born in Ankara on 8 September 1928, the eldest child of Vehbi Koç (1901–1996).

She graduated from the American College for Girls in Istanbul.

== Career ==
Arsel founded the Koç University School of Nursing. As of August 2021, Forbes estimated her net worth at US$1.9 billion. Arsel is the chairperson of the Vehbi Koç Foundation.

== Personal life ==
Her husband Nusret Arsel died in January 2014. They had no children. She lives in Istanbul.
