= Vincenzo Cosentino =

Vincenzo Antonio Cosentino (born August 13, 1982) is an Italian filmmaker, director, screenwriter and editor.

== Biography ==
Cosentino was born in Syracuse on August 13, 1982. He lived mostly in Gravina di Catania, Sicily. After finishing his studies in economics in Catania, he migrated to Australia in March 2007 to study film making.

He failed at his first competition (Tropfest). Frustration brought him to make other short movies and his first success came with the short film "I Have Learned" in an Avid Student Competition. Cosentino made eight short films in less than 10 months.

He is the writer, director, cinematographer and editor of all his eight short movies (except in the movie "The Light" where he was not the cinematographer).

== Filmography ==
=== Short films ===
- Roads (November 2007)
- The Light (January 2008)
- The Old Dog (January 2008)
- I Have Learned (February 2008)
- Giorgino's Arrival (February 2008)
- Redemption (March 2008)
- Wait For Me (March 2008)
- The Flip Trip (May 2008)

== Awards ==
- Festival de Cannes Short Movie Competition (Flip Video Contest) – 1st Place with the Short Film “The Flip Trip” (Director Price)
- Avid Award (“One minute Film Competition”) – 1st Place with the Short Film “I Have Learned” (Director Price).
- Sicilian Film Festival (Official Selection) with the short film "I Have Learned".

== Education and qualifications ==
- 2007/2008 – (March ‘07/February ‘08) Diploma of Screen (Film Making – Digital) SAE Headquarters of Byron Bay, Australia
- 2007 (August–December ‘07) Certificate III in Screen (Film Making – Film, 16mm) Queensland School of Film and Television of Brisbane, Australia
- 2002/2006 Bachelor's degree Of Economics Economy University of Catania, Italy
