= Global Relations Forum =

- Global İlişkiler Forumu
- Abbreviation: GRF
- Formation: May 11, 2009; 17 years ago
- Type: Association
- Headquarters: Istanbul, Turkey
- President: Timur Söylemez
- Honorary President: Rahmi Koç
- Website: https://www.gif.org.tr

Global Relations Forum (Turkish: Global İlişkiler Forumu, GRF) is an independent, non-partisan, non-profit think-tank and association founded on May 11, 2009, in Istanbul, Turkey with the committed support of 40 Turkish men and women who have assumed prominent roles in international fora and have received international recognition for their efforts throughout their careers. The founding members include former secretaries of state, university presidents, central bank governors, ECHR justice and retired ambassadors as well as leading business leaders, scholars, artists, and journalists. GRF is a platform designed to engage, inform, and stimulate its members and all interested individuals on matters related to international affairs and global issues. GRF advocates a global order of shared influence and accountability and seeks a constructive role for Turkey in that order.

GRF events have hosted individuals from diverse fields, including Fatih Birol, executive director of the International Energy Agency; Jacques Nasser, former president and CEO of Ford Motor Company; Richard N. Haass, president of the Council on Foreign Relations; and Lord Simon of Highbury, former executive director of GDF Suez Group and member of the House of Lords. Other attendees include Muhtar Kent, former chairman and CEO of Coca-Cola; Stephen Heintz, CEO of the Rockefeller Brothers Fund; Michael R. Bloomberg, 108th mayor of New York City; Sandy Weill, former chairman of Citigroup; Suzan Sabancı Dinçer, chairwoman and managing director of Akbank; Erdem Başçı, former governor of the Central Bank of Turkey; Madeleine Albright, former U.S. secretary of state; and Chuck Hagel, former co-chairman of the U.S. President’s Intelligence Advisory Board.

== GRF board members ==
- Rahmi M. Koç, Honorary Chairman
- Zeynep Bodur Okyay, Chairwoman
- Füsun Türkmen, Vice-Chairwoman
- Ahmet Üzümcü, Vice-Chairman
- Feride Acar, Member
- Taşkın Osman Aksoy, Member
- Gülay Barbarosoğlu, Member
- Tayfun Bayazıt, Member
- Altuğ Bilgin, Member
- İpek Cem Taha, Member
- Hikmet Çetin, Member
- Ayşe Canan Ediboğlu, Member
- Gözde Küçük Adıyaman, Member
- Sibel Asna, Member
- Doğan Taşkent, Member
- Rona Yırcalı, Member

== GRF Studies ==
=== GRF Task Forces ===
GRF Task Forces are independent commissions that strive to propose policy recommendations on matters that involve medium to long-term uncertainty. Task Force members are diverse in professional backgrounds, experience and opinion but unite around the principles of consultation and search for common ground. Task Force members participate in the Task Force in their individual capacities; their views do not necessarily represent those of their institutions. GRF has undertaken various task forces focusing on critical global and regional topics. These include Turkey-USA relations, energy and climate change, Turkey’s approach to security in the 21st century, global trade and Turkey in the 21st century, the Middle East and North Africa, and the future of EU-Turkey relations.

=== Track II Studies ===
GRF Track-II Studies facilitate informal diplomacy by engaging high-level individuals from other countries in discussions aimed at advancing bilateral relations and addressing global issues. These initiatives seek to complement official dialogues by fostering civil society engagement, contributing to foreign policy development, and enhancing public diplomacy.

The studies focus on identifying areas of convergence and divergence between nations, promoting in-depth exchanges on shared challenges, and exploring innovative solutions to potential conflicts. Notable Track-II collaborations include the Ananta Aspen Center “Turkey-India Forum” and the Carnegie Moscow Center “Turkey-Russia Relations.”

== GRF Community ==
The GRF Community consists of individuals who have participated in one of GRF’s programs. The Young Fellows Program and Young Academics Program were established to provide participants with a platform to analyze and discuss global issues. The Young Fellows Program selects undergraduates from leading universities worldwide and top institutions in Istanbul.

The Young Academics Program is designed for young academics in the final year of their doctoral studies or those who have completed their Ph.D. within the past three years, either in Turkey or abroad. The Young Professionals Program is open to individuals under 38 years old who have at least four years of experience in private companies, public institutions, or NGOs.

== Membership ==
GRF members are Turkish men and women who have assumed prominent roles in international fora and have received international recognition for their efforts throughout their careers. Corporate membership is designed for globally engaged companies, that can contribute significantly to GRF's work.
