= Sadberk Hanım Museum =

Private museum in Turkey

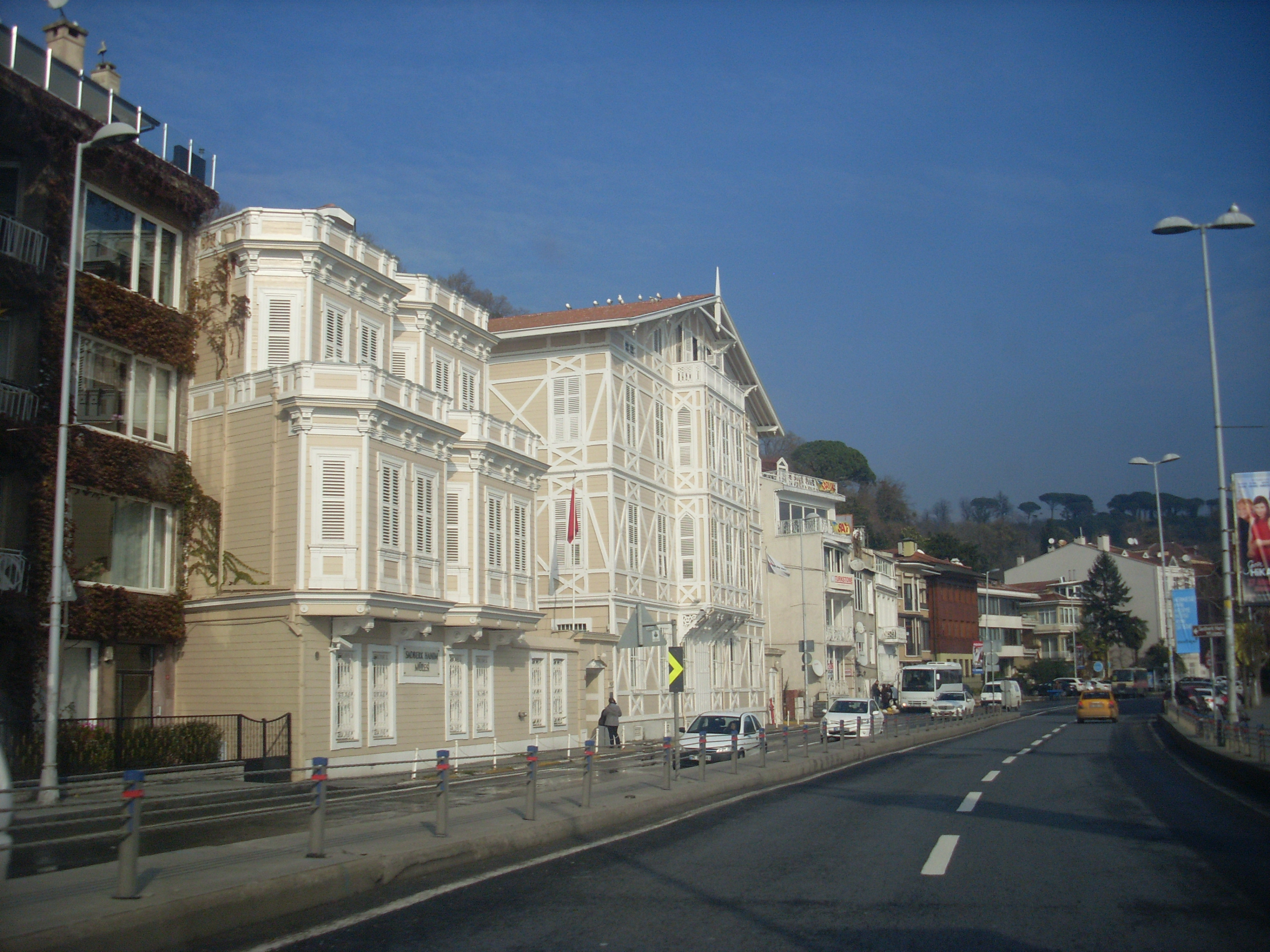
- Sarıyer, Büyükdere, Piyasa Street
- Interactive fullscreen map
- Established: October 14, 1980
- Location: Büyükdere Piyasa Caddesi 27–29, Büyükdere, Sarıyer, Istanbul, Turkey
- Coordinates: 41°09′47″N 29°02′52″E
- Type: Archaeology, ethnography
- Website: sadberkhanimmuzesi.org.tr

The Sadberk Hanım Museum (Turkish: Sadberk Hanım Müzesi) is a private museum on the shores of the Bosphorus in the Büyükdere neighbourhood of Sarıyer district in Istanbul, Turkey. It was established by the Vehbi Koç Foundation in memory of Vehbi Koç’s deceased wife Sadberk. The museum is open every day except Wednesdays.

It is intended that the museum will move to new premises in one of the abandoned warehouses on the shores of the Golden Horn as part of the Tersane Istanbul/Haliçport project.

== Buildings ==
The museum occupies two separate 19th-century wooden villas. The original building, constructed of wood and lathe-and-plaster on a masonry foundation, consists of three storeys plus an attic; its architecture was inspired by European vernacular traditions. Originally known as the Azeryan Yalısı (Azarian waterside mansion), it belonged to the wealthy Azarian family who were Armenian Catholics from Sivas. The crossed wooden moldings decorating the exterior give the building a distinctive appearance quite different from that of its neighbors. Because of these moldings the building was for a long time popularly known as the Threaded Yalı (Turkish: Vidalı Yalısı).

The building was purchased for use as a summerhouse by the Koç family in 1950, but in 1978 the decision was taken to convert it into a museum. The conversion was carried out between 1978 and 1980 according to a restoration project prepared by the Turkish architect, Sedat Hakkı Eldem. It opened its doors to the public on October 14, 1980, with the Sadberk Koç collection on display.

The Azeryan Yalı occupies 400 m^{2} (4,300 sq ft) of space set in grounds measuring a total of 4,280 m^{2} (46,100 sq ft). The ground floor contains a gift shop and a small tea room. The ceiling over the main entrance, which is no longer used, is decorated with plaster moldings inspired by ancient Roman architecture. Wooden staircases lead to the upper floors. The walls are painted to resemble veined marble. The centrally located main halls of the second and third floors and the rooms opening onto them are used for display purposes. The attic is used for storage and also contains offices and a library.

In 1983, the Vehbi Koç Foundation purchased the Hüseyin Kocabaş collection for the Sadberk Hanım Museum and bought a semi-dilapidated adjacent yalı to house these new acquisitions. The facade of this second yali, which is thought to have been constructed in the early part of this century, was faithfully reconstructed according to the original by İbrahim Yalçın, and the work took two years to complete. This new section, housing works from the pre-Islamic period, was named the Sevgi Gönül Wing after the daughter of Sadberk. It opened on October 24, 1988, and was immediately awarded the Europa Nostra prize as an outstanding example of modern museum architecture and design.

The new wing is completely constructed of reinforced concrete as a precaution against fire. The front is clad in wood while the side is clad in marble stucco treated to resemble wood. The building has three storeys at the front and four at the back, including the ground floor on which are located a multi-purpose hall and conservation laboratory. Archaeological objects are displayed in chronological order across all the floors. The entrance floor is paved in white Afyon marble while black Adapazarı marble was used for the floors of the exhibition spaces and the stairs. All the exhibition areas are sealed off from daylight and the display cases are illuminated in keeping with modern museum techniques. The total exhibition space is 625 square metres (6,730 sq ft).

In 2007, Vehbi Koç's summer house nearby in Büyükdere was opened to the public to showcase some of the kilims collected during her lifetime by the American traveller, Josephine Powell, and donated after her death to the Vehbi Koç Foundation.

== Exhibits ==
=== Archeological section (Sevgi Gönül Wing) ===
- Anatolian civilizations
  - Late Neolithic and Early Chalcolithic periods
  - Early Bronze Age
  - Historical periods
  - Iron Age
- Ion and Helen civilizations
  - The Myceanaen period
  - Geometric period
  - Orientalizing and Early Archaic period
  - Archaic period
  - Lydia
  - Classical period
  - 4th Century BC
  - Hellenistic Age
- Roman civilization
  - Roman period
- Byzantine Art
- Lamps
- Jewelry
- Sculptures and steles
- Glass objects
- Beads
- Coins
  - Non-Islamic coinage

=== Art history section (Azaryan Yalısı) ===
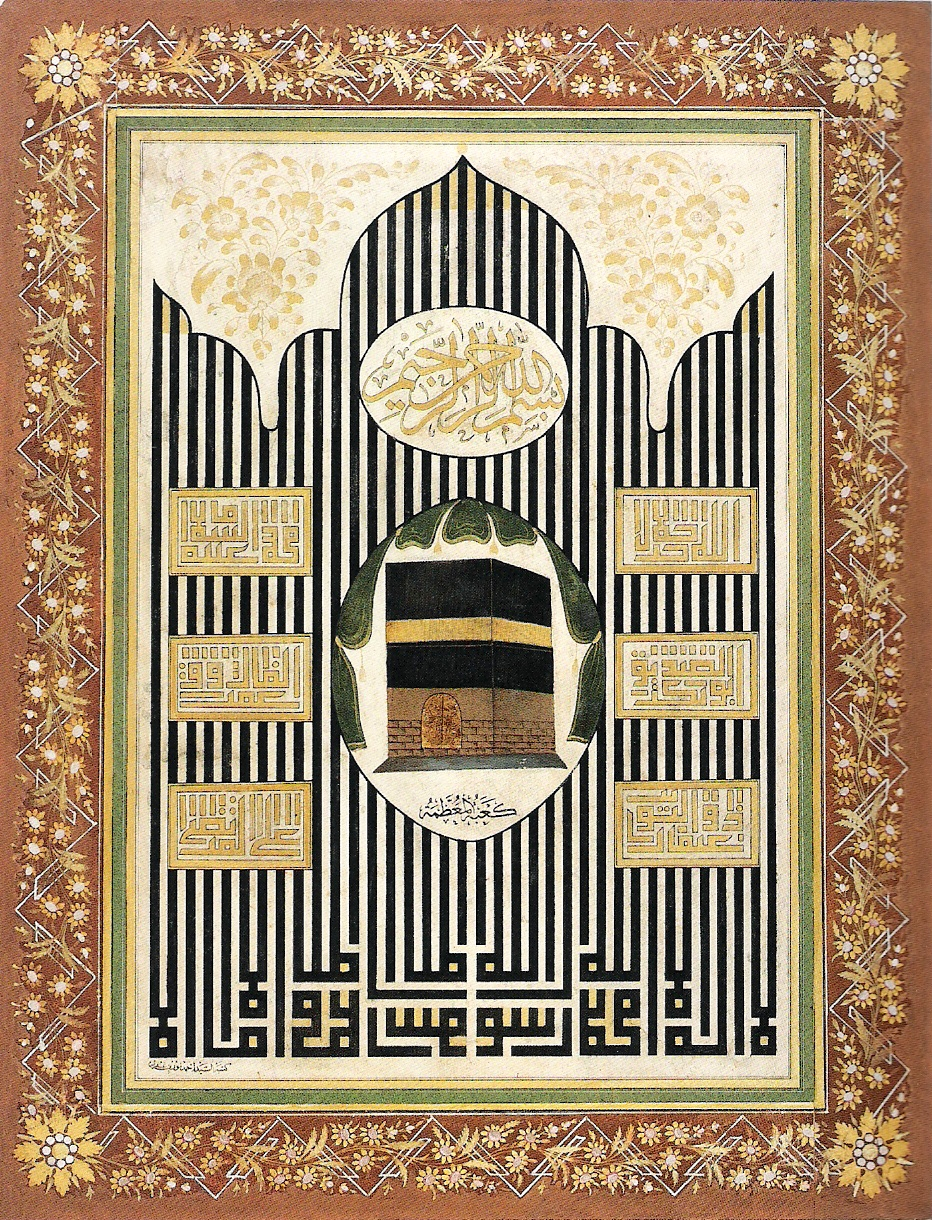
19th century Islamic denomination in the style of a Mamluk tughra by Es-Seyid Mehmed Nuri

- Coins
  - Gold coins of the Ottoman Empire and Turkish Republic
- Islamic Art
  - Early Islamic Art
  - Seldjuk Art
  - Ayyubid and Mamluk Art
  - Timurid and Safavid Art
- The Ottoman Period
  - Ottoman Art
  - Silver
  - Tombak and Brass
  - Iznik tiles and ceramics
  - Chinese celadons and porcelains
  - Çanakkale ceramics
  - Turkish porcelains
  - Beykoz and Bohemian glassware
  - Silk fabrics
  - Embroideries
- Women’s costumes
- Traditions
  - The coffee service
  - Henna party
  - Childbed customs
  - Circumcision bed
