= Mustafa Pancar =

Turkish artist

Mustafa Pancar (1964-4 February 2026 London) is a Turkish artist.

== Early life and education ==
Pancar was born in Istanbul, Turkey in 1964. He graduated from the painting department of Mimar Sinan University, Faculty of Fine Arts.

== Collections ==
Pancar's works are held in the Istanbul Museum of Modern Art.

== Exhibitions ==
=== Solo ===
- 1994: "Sonradan Boyanmışlar", Atatürk Library, Istanbul, Turkey
- 2000: "Kuryenin Rüyası", Academic Art Center, Istanbul, Turkey
- 2002: "Karışık Hikayeler", Istanbul, Turkey
- 2004: "Uzaylılar – Halı Savaşları", Evin Art Gallery, Istanbul, Turkey
- 2006: "Serbest Pazar", Evin Art Gallery, Istanbul, Turkey
- 2008: "Shadow World", K4, Nuremberg, Germany
- 2008: "Gölge Dünya", Evin Art Gallery, Istanbul, Turkey
- 2010: "Tools - Human animal", Kare Art Gallery, Istanbul, Turkey
- 2010: "Alet Kutusu", Kullukcu, Munich, Germany

=== Group ===
- 2009: "Istanbul Next Wave" Martin-Gropius-Bau, Berlin, Germany;"Culture Industry, Folklore and Clichés" VOX, Athens, Greece
- 2010: "Hunter video and film programme"
- 2010: "Tactics of Invisibility" Tanas, Berlin, Germany
- 2010: "Tactics of Invisibility" Thyssen-Bornemisza Art Contemporary, Vienna, Austria
- 2010: "Hafriyat. Spare Time. Great Work." Munich, Germany
- 2010: "Arter. Second Exhibition"
