= Anthony Beeson =

English iconographer

Anthony Beeson (born April 1948) is a classical iconographer and an expert on Roman and Greek art and architecture. He was also the archivist of the Association for Roman Archaeology and the former art librarian at Bristol City Libraries. He reassembled the Orpheus Mosaic in Bristol City Museum and Art Gallery.

== Selected publications ==
- Central Bristol Through The Ages
- Central Bristol Through Time
- North Bristol Through Time
- North Brighton: London Road to Coledean Through Time
- North Brighton: Preston, Withdean & Patcham Through Time
- Wareham and The Isle of Purbeck Through Time
- Westbury on Trym to Avonmouth Through Time
