= Yenişehir District =

Yenişehir District may refer to:

- Yenişehir, Bursa
- Yenişehir, Mersin
- Yenişehir, Diyarbakır
