= Ali Koç =

Turkish businessman

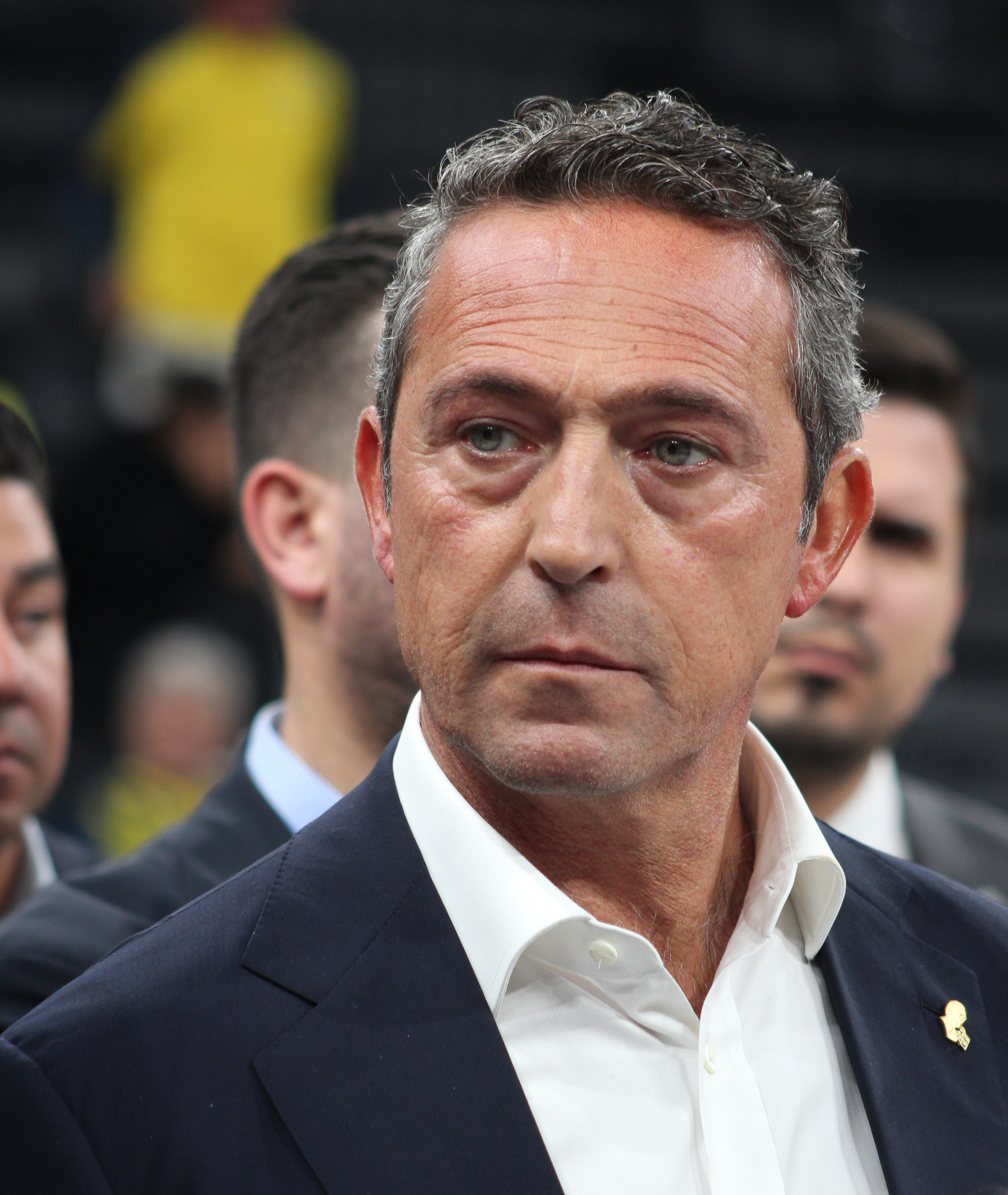
- Koç in 2024

President of Fenerbahçe
- In office 5 June 2018 – 25 September 2025
- Preceded by: Aziz Yıldırım
- Succeeded by: Sadettin Saran

President of Turkish Union of Clubs
- In office 21 June 2022 – 29 July 2025
- Preceded by: Ahmet Ağaoğlu
- Succeeded by: Ertuğrul Doğan

Personal details
- Born: Yıldırım Ali Koç; 2 April 1967 (age 59) Şişli, Istanbul, Turkey
- Spouse: Nevbahar Demirağ (m. 2005)
- Children: 2
- Parent(s): Rahmi Koç; Çiğdem Simavi
- Relatives: Mustafa Vehbi Koç (brother); Mehmet Ömer Koç (brother)
- Education: Harrow School
- Alma mater: Rice University (BA); Harvard Business School (MBA)
- Occupation: Businessman (Member of the board, Koç Holding)
- Website: Official Website

Ali Yıldırım Koç (born 2 April 1967) is a Turkish businessman. He is a third-generation member of Turkey's wealthiest Koç family and the youngest son of Rahmi Koç. From June 2018 to September 2025, he was the 37th president of Fenerbahçe Sports Club.

== Early life ==
After finishing high school at Harrow School (1980–85), London, he received a BA degree in managerial studies from Rice University (1985–89), Houston, Texas, followed by an MBA degree from Harvard Business School (1995–97).

== Career ==
In 1990-1991, he attended the management trainee program of American Express Bank. From 1992 to 1994, he was an analyst at Morgan Stanley.

In 1997, he joined Koç Holding, and held various senior positions within the company. From 2006 to 2010, he was the president of corporate communication and information of the family group.

He was a board member of Süper Lig football club Fenerbahçe. He had a fourth two-year term as vice-president since Aziz Yıldırım came to power. Koç is a Rotarian and a member of the Istanbul Open Sea Yacht Club and New York Yacht Club. Koç is on the board of directors of Endeavor Turkey, an international non-profit development organization that seeks to find and support high-impact entrepreneurs in emerging markets.

He was elected the 37th Fenerbahçe president in June 2018, beating former president and candidate Aziz Yıldırım with 77.6% of the votes for a three year long term. In June 2022, he was elected as the president of the Turkish Union of Clubs. He was awarded as Honorary Commander of the Order of the British Empire (CBE), for services to trade and investment between the UK and Turkey. Koç is a member of the Global Advisory Council of Bank of America, the Global Board of Advisors at the Council on Foreign Relations, and the Board of Trustees at Chatham House. At the Fenerbahçe Sports Club Extraordinary General Assembly Meeting held on 21 September 2025, where 24,732 votes were cast, of which 24,393 were deemed valid he lost the election to Sadettin Saran, when Saran became the 38th president of Fenerbahçe with 12,325 votes, while Ali Koç received 12,068 votes.

== Personal life ==
Koç married Nevbahar Demirağ in 2005, and they have two children.
