= State Medal of Distinguished Service =

Devlet Üstün Hizmet Madalyası State Medal of Distinguished Service
- Type: Medal
- Awarded for: Distinguished service in contribution to the emerge of Turkish State through generous action, self-sacrifice, accomplishment or merit at home or abroad.
- Country: Turkey
- Presented by: the President of Turkey
- Status: Active
- Established: October 24, 1983

Precedence
- Next (lower): Medal of Freedom

State Medal of Distinguished Service (Turkish: Devlet Üstün Hizmet Madalyası) is one of the three civil state decorations of Turkey. The medal was established on October 24, 1983 with the Law on Medals and Orders, Act No. 2933. It is rewarded to Turkish citizens, foreigners and organizations for distinguished service in contribution to the emerge of Turkish State through generous action, self-sacrifice, accomplishment or merit at home or abroad.

The medal is bestowed by the President of Turkey upon cabinet's approval of the proposal of a government minister, the speaker of the parliament or the chief of general staff.

To the medal belong a lapel pin and a certificate.

== Design ==
The medal has an oval form and is 45 mm (1.8 in) long. It is of gold plated metal. The medal's front depicts the Turkish moon and crescent with the initials "T.C." (abbreviation of "Türkiye Cumhuriyeti" for "Turkish Republic") in relief. The reverse depicts relevant symbols and motifs with the inscription "T.C. Devlet Şeref Madalyası" (Turkish Republic Medal of Distinguished Service). The medal is attached to a ribbon

The medal's lapel pin is in a rectangular form of 10 mm × 30 mm (0.39 in × 1.18 in). It depicts a composition in red and white with the initials "T.C." made of enamel on gold plate.

The medal and the lapel pin are minted at the national mint and printer (Turkish: Darphane ve Damga Matbaası).

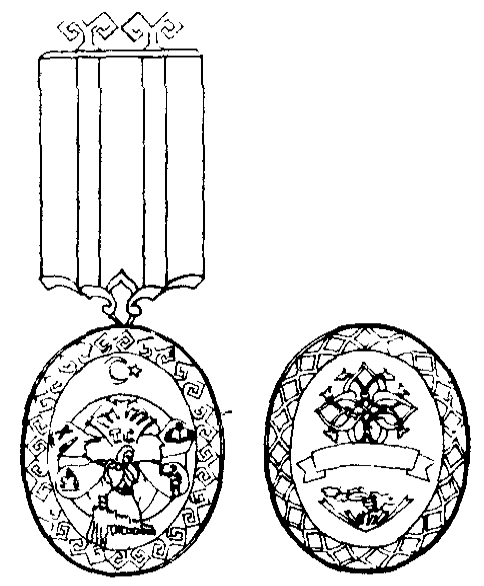
State Medal of Distinguished Service (Turkey)

== Notable recipients ==
- 1996 İzzet Baysal Foundation
- 1997 Sakıp Sabancı, businessman
- 1997 Rahmi Koç, businessman
- 1997 Suna Kıraç, businesswoman
- 1997 Şakir Eczacıbaşı, businessman and photographer
- 1999 Ahmet Çalık, businessman
- 1999 Aydın Doğan, businessman
- 2000 Gazi Yaşargil, medical scientist and neurosurgeon
- 2000 Galatasaray S.K.
- 2001 Turkey national basketball team
- 2002 Turkey national football team
- 2002 Şenol Güneş, footballer and coach of the national team
- 2002 Haluk Ulusoy, president of Turkish Football Federation

== See also ==
- Turkish State Medal of Honor
- Turkish State Medal of Pride
