= Mustafa Vehbi Koç =

Turkish businessman (1960–2016)

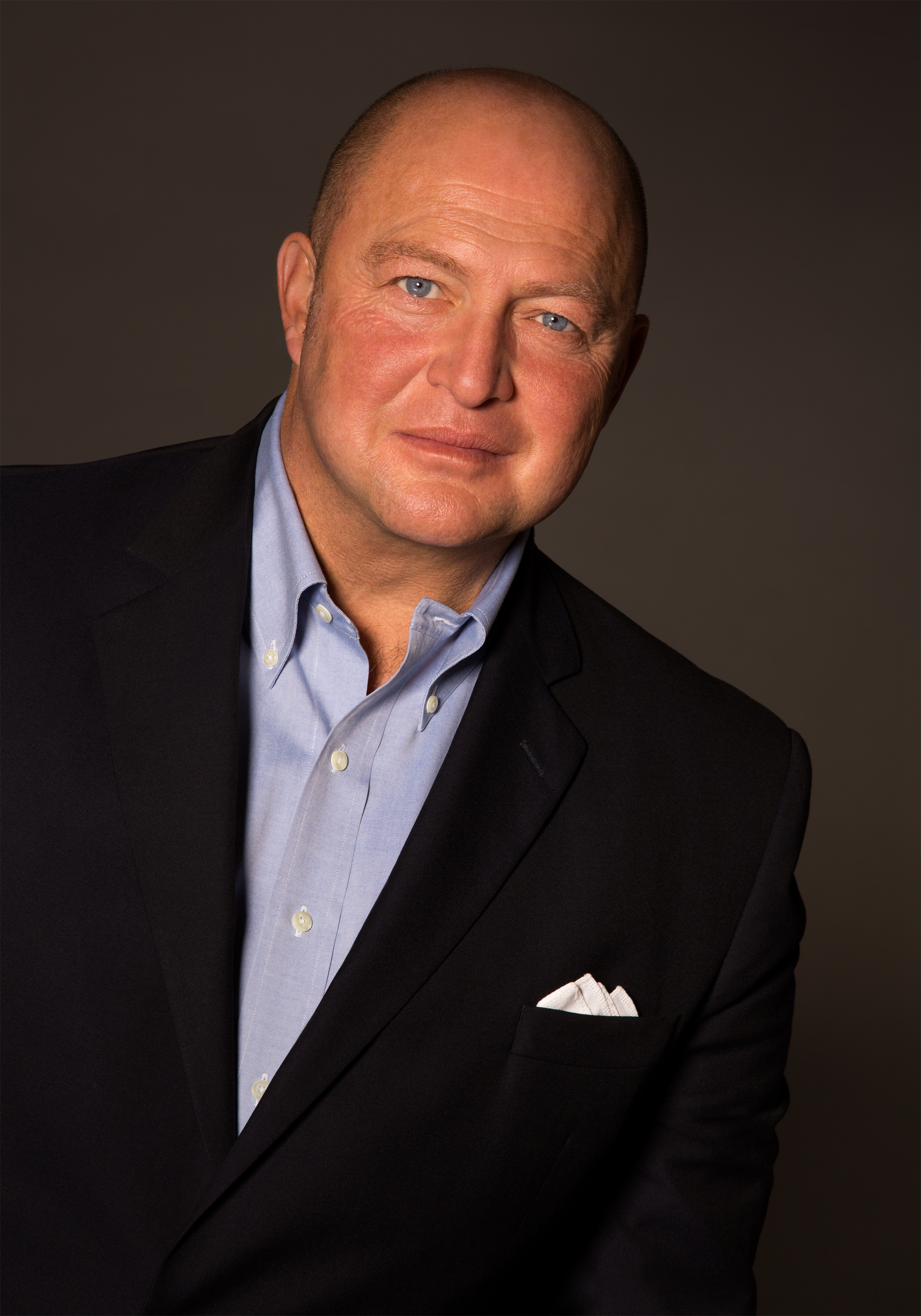
- Koç in 2013
- Born: October 29, 1960; Ankara, Turkey
- Died: January 21, 2016 (aged 55); Istanbul, Turkey
- Resting place: Zincirlikuyu Cemetery
- Education: Sankt Georgs-Kolleg; Lyceum Alpinum Zuoz
- Alma mater: George Washington University (BA)
- Known for: Chairman of Koç Holding
- Spouse(s): Caroline Koç (m. 1992 – d. 2016)
- Children: 2
- Parent(s): Rahmi Koç; Çiğdem Simavi
- Relatives: Mehmet Ömer Koç (brother); Ali Yıldırım Koç (brother)

Mustafa Vehbi Koç (October 29, 1960 – January 21, 2016) was a Turkish businessman and a third generation member of the Koç family. He is best known as the chairman of Koç Holding, a position he held from 2003 until his death in 2016.

== Private life ==
Mustafa Koç was born to Rahmi Koç, the second-generation patriarch of the Koç family, on October 29, 1960. He had two younger brothers Mehmet Ömer Koç (born 1962) and Ali Yıldırım Koç (born 1967). Koç attended middle school at Sankt Georgs-Kolleg in Istanbul, graduating from Switzerland’s international boarding high school Lyceum Alpinum Zuoz in 1980, Mustafa Koç received his bachelor's degree in business administration from George Washington University in 1984.

Koç was married to Caroline Giraud and was father of two daughters Esra Marianne Çiğdem Koç and Aylin Elif Koç.

== Professional career ==
After graduation, Koç started working as a Consultant at Tofaş. Continuing his career as sales manager and later as assistant general manager for Sales at Ram Dış Ticaret, in 1992, he joined Koç Holding to serve as vice president.

Working at Koç Holding, Turkey's largest industrial conglomerate and the only Turkish company listed in Fortune 500, for all of his career, Koç became a board member in 2001. Assuming the responsibility as vice chairman the following year, he took over the position of chairman from Rahmi Koç, his retired father, in 2003. Mustafa Koç was also the chairman for the High Advisory Council to TÜSİAD, the Turkish Industry and Business Association, between 2003 until 2015. Between 2006 and 2013, he was Honorary Consul for Finland, as well as being a member of Council for Foreign Economic Affairs for the Istanbul Chamber of Industry. Koç also held various international positions during his career, including positions in JP Morgan’s International Council, Rolls-Royce International’s Advisory Board, and Bilderberg Meetings’ Executive Board. He was awarded the Cavaliere D’Industria medal by the Italian government in 2005.

== Death and legacy ==
Mustafa Koç suffered a heart attack during a fitness exercise at his home and died on January 21, 2016. He was buried at Zincirlikuyu Cemetery next to his grandfather's grave. A documentary film titled "Dreams and Memories" about the legacy of Mustafa Koç was produced in 2017.

He had been a lifelong sports enthusiast, with hobbies ranging from sailing, aeromodelling and golf, to scuba diving and horse riding. A sports award named after Mustafa Koç was established in 2017 to honor his memory. Celebrating the ideals and merits of sportsmanship, the "Mustafa V. Koç Sports Award" is judged by the Turkish Olympic Committee.
