= Vehbi Koç =

Turkish entrepreneur and philanthropist (1901–1996)

Ahmet Vehbi Koç
- Born: 20 July 1901; Keçiören, Angora vilayet, Ottoman Empire
- Died: 25 February 1996 (aged 94); Antalya, Turkey
- Resting place: Zincirlikuyu Cemetery, Istanbul, Turkey
- Organization(s): Koç Holding; Vehbi Koç Foundation
- Known for: Renowned as Turkey's wealthiest individual
- Spouse: Sadberk Koç
- Children: Semahat Arsel (b. 1928); Rahmi Koç (b. 1930); Sevgi Gönül (1938–2003); Suna Kıraç (1941–2020)
- Relatives: Koç family

Ahmet Vehbi Koç (20 July 1901 – 25 February 1996) was a Turkish billionaire, businessman, entrepreneur and philanthropist who founded the Koç Group, one of Turkey's largest groups of companies. During his lifetime, he came to be one of Turkey's wealthiest citizens. He was also a well-known philanthropist with interests in health, education and the arts.

== Early life ==
Vehbi Koç was born in 1901 in Çorakalı, a predominantly Muslim neighbourhood of Ankara. He then lived in a vineyard estate in the Keçiören district, since absorbed into Ankara. Purchased by his father in 1923, the property, which was left vacant after the Kasapyan family moved to Istanbul from Ankara during the Armenian genocide, was later acquired by Koç and became the Vehbi Koç museum in 1944 after a thorough renovation.

== Career ==
Koç began his working career in 1917 at the small grocery store his father opened for him in Ankara. The first firm he established was called Koçzade Ahmet Vehbi and was registered in 1926 at the Ankara Chamber of Commerce. While working in commerce, he became the local partner of Ford Motor Company and Standard Oil (presently Mobil) in 1928. When Ankara became the capital of the young Turkish Republic, construction work increased rapidly and Koç began trading in construction materials, building supplies and hardware. Following the establishment of branch offices in Istanbul and Eskişehir in 1938, he merged all these enterprises into a company called Koç Ticaret A.Ş.

In 1942, Vehbi Koç saw the opportunities the Varlık Vergisi, a wealth tax imposed on non-Muslims, afforded him as a businessman and took over many collapsed or confiscated companies. One such acquisition was an Istanbul building owned by an Armenian named Margarios Ohanyan, who had sold a property worth 1.5-2 million liras at market prices through public auction for significantly below its value as he attempted to avoid paying the huge tax hike. Koç, nevertheless, hired many of the former owners and treated them with fairness and without racial prejudice.

My constitutional law is this: I exist if my country and my state exists. We all exist if there is democracy. We must put our best efforts into strengthening the economy of our country. As our economy strengthens, democracy will take a stronger hold and our credibility in the world will increase.

— Vehbi Koç from his memoir Targets and Principles

Following the end of World War II, Koç toured the US in 1946 to meet executives of the businesses with which he was partnering in Turkey. Having convinced General Electric management that it was a good idea, he signed an agreement in 1948 to build a light bulb factory in Turkey, which opened in 1952. During the 1950s Koç factories produced automobiles, household appliances, radiators, electronic devices, textiles and matches. He also founded companies like Bozkurt Mensucat, Arçelik in 1955, Demir Döküm in 1954, Turkay, Aygaz in 1962, Gazal, Türk Elektrik Endüstrisi and a joint cable factory with Siemens. Tractor production also started under a Fiat license.

Koç's first initiative in the automotive sector eventually turned into a full-scale industry. Following an agreement with the Ford Motor Company in 1959, he set up Ford Otosan. Following the production of the first domestic mass-production car Anadol in 1966 and in line with the improving economic atmosphere in Turkey, Koç collaborated with the Italian company Fiat to establish Tofaş in 1968 resulting in the production of the second domestic car Murat in 1971.

In 1963, Vehbi Koç consolidated all the companies bearing his name under the same roof and founded Koç Holding A.Ş. This was the start of the holdings era in Turkey and many businessmen followed Koç in the same direction. The group has international partnerships with well-known companies such as Fiat, Ford Motor Co., Yamaha and Allianz.

During Koç's seventy-six-year business career, he created an organisation with more than 108 companies in the Koç Group, specialising in different sectors such as food, retailing, finance, energy, automotives, tourism and technology. The Koç Group has 80,000 employees, ca.$40 billion turnover, $900 million of exports and $500–600 million of investment annually.

Koç retired in 1984 to devote more time to social activities and his son Rahmi Koç took over the leadership of the Koç Group companies.

== Political career ==
In the 1920s, Vehbi Koç joined the predecessor of the Republican Peoples' Party (CHP), the Association for Defense of National Rights. As his business flourished so his relationship with the CHP became closer. In 1943 he was even asked to represent the CHP in the Grand National Assembly of Turkey although he declined. This relationship with the CHP became an obstacle to further development of the Koç Group and he came under pressure from the ruling Democrat Party (DP) to join it instead. On 16 March 1960 he quit the CHP but without joining the DP. Instead of becoming a member of a political party he chose to develop amicable relations with a newly elected Turkish Government and the Turkish Army.

== Philanthropy ==
Vehbi Koç founded an Eye Bank at the Faculty of Medicine of Ankara University, a Cardiology Institute at the Faculty of Medicine of Istanbul University, and the Vehbi Koç Dormitory at Middle East Technical University. Under the leadership of Vehbi Koç, 205 businesspeople, academics, and intellectuals came together to establish the Turkish Education Foundation (Turkish: Türk Eğitim Vakfı, commonly abbreviated as TEV) in 1967.

He also established the Vehbi Koç Foundation on 17 January 1969 to promote activities in the fields of education, health and culture. Vehbi Koç donated the Atatürk Library in Taksim to the Municipality of Istanbul in 1976 and in 1980 opened Turkey's first private museum, the Sadberk Hanım Museum in memory of his late wife, Sadberk Koç. Koç was honorary chairman of Gençlerbirliği S.K. in Ankara.

Koç School opened in 1988 and Koç University in 1993. He also established the Turkish Family Health and Planning Foundation (Turkish: Türkiye Aile Sağlığı ve Planlaması Vakfı) and functioned as the president of the foundation until his death.

== Death ==
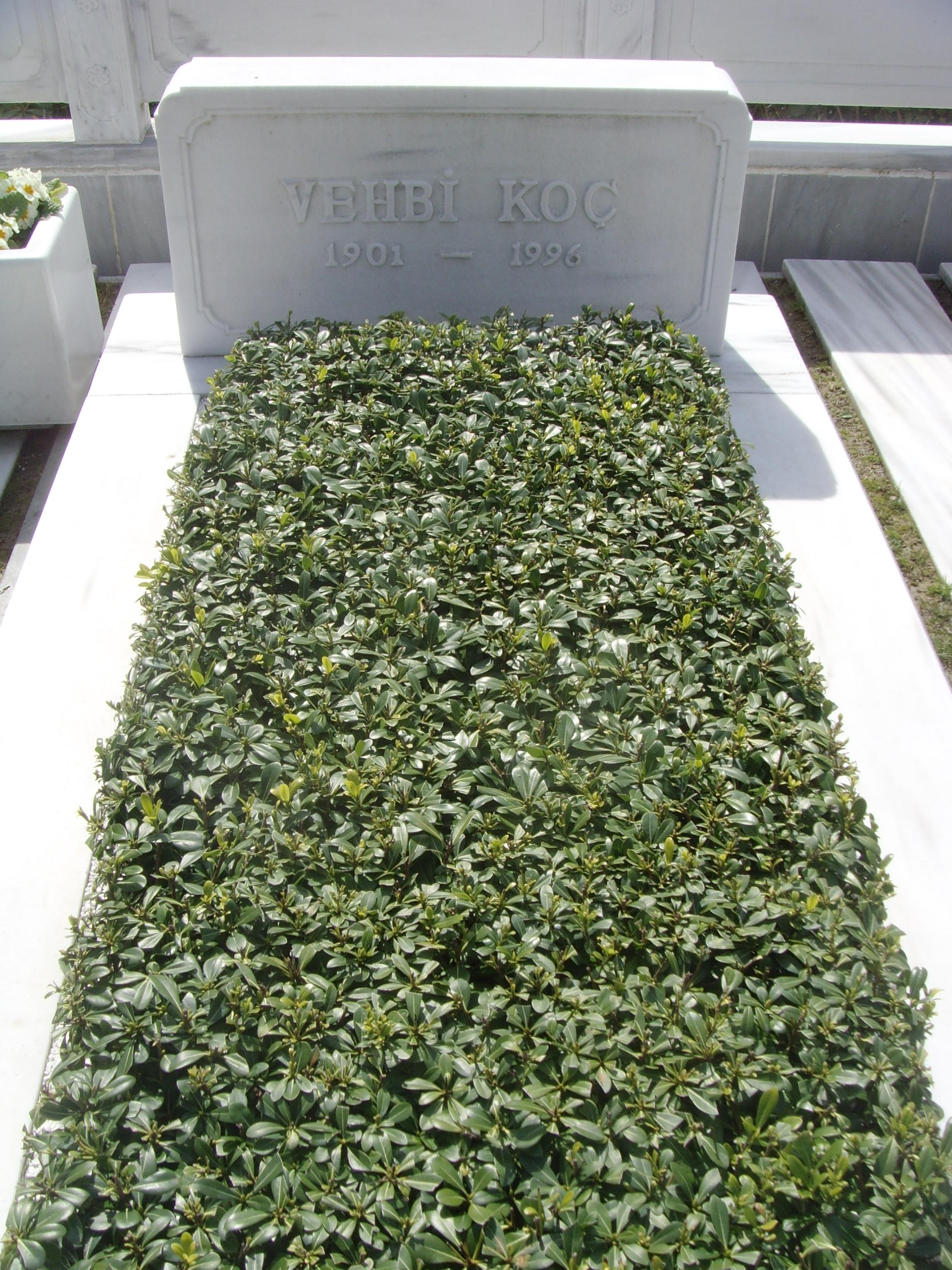
The grave of Vehbi Koç at Zincirlikuyu Cemetery, Istanbul

On 25 February 1996 Vehbi Koç died of heart failure during a Migros tour in Antalya, where he was on holiday with his daughter Sevgi and son-in-law over Ramazan Bayramı. The same evening his body was transported to Istanbul by a Koç Holding business jet. On 27 February 1996, following a funeral service at the Koç Holding headquarters and then in Fatih Mosque, he was laid to rest at the Zincirlikuyu Cemetery. He was succeeded by his son Rahmi Koç (b. 1930), and his daughters Semahat Arsel (b. 1928), Sevgi Gönül (1938–2003) and Suna Kıraç (1941–2020).

== Stealing of Koç's body ==
On 24 October 1996, the body of Vehbi Koç was stolen from his grave. The body snatchers then called the Koç family to demand a ransom. When the family refused to pay, they appealed to the TV channel Kanal D, owned by Aydın Doğan, asking for 20 billion TL, around US$210,000 at that time. When Kanal D also refused to pay, the body snatchers called the TV channel InterStar, then owned by Cem Uzan, and reached an agreement to release the body for 25 billion TL (around US$260,000).

Informed by the TV channel, the police captured two suspects, who came to a meeting point in a stolen car. Later, three other accomplices, including a woman and a hotel owner, were also arrested. Vehbi Koç's body was found in another grave in the original cemetery not far from his resting place.

At the request of the public prosecutor, the remains were taken to the city's forensic medicine laboratory for identification by DNA profiling. Finally, they were reinterred in the presence of Koç family members.

== Publications ==
- "Hayat Hikayem" (Story of My Life), 1973 (in Turkish and English)
- "Hatıralarım, Görüşlerim, Öğütlerim" (My Memories, Visions, Advices), 1987 (in Turkish and English)
