= Arter (art center) =

Art center in Turkey

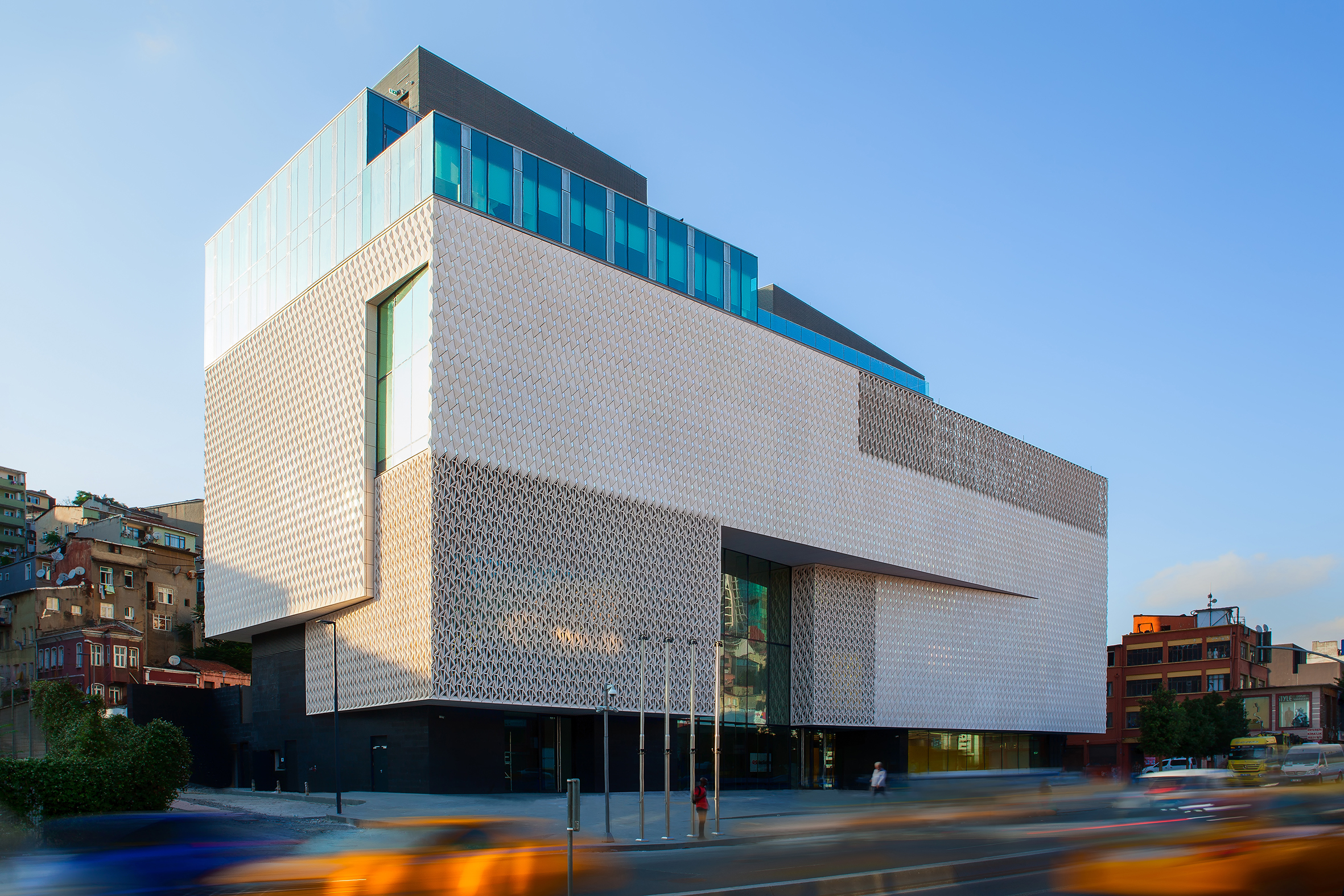
- Arter designed by Grimshaw Architects
- Established: 8 May 2010
- Location: Irmak Avenue No: 13, Beyoglu, Istanbul, Turkey
- Type: Non-profit art institution
- Founder: Vehbi Koç Foundation

Arter is a contemporary art museum in the Dolapdere district of Istanbul, Turkey.

A subsidiary of the Vehbi Koç Foundation, Arter was opened in 2010 with the aim of providing a sustainable infrastructure for producing and exhibiting contemporary art. Following eight years of operation during which it contributed to the visibility of contemporary art with a programme featuring exhibitions, publications, talks, performances and workshops at its venue on Istiklal Street, Arter moved to its new home in the Dolapdere district of Istanbul in September 2019. At its new building, Arter continues expanding the range of its activities beyond exhibitions to performances and events across many disciplines.

Arter presented 64 exhibitions and provided support for the production of over 210 artworks between May 2010 and September 2023.

== History ==
Istiklal Street, Beyoğlu

Between 2010 and 2018, Arter has presented 26 solo and 9 group exhibitions at Meymenet Han on Istiklal Street.

Arter's inaugural exhibition Starter (8 May–31 January 2010) presented more than 160 works by 87 artists, all belonging to the Arter Collection.

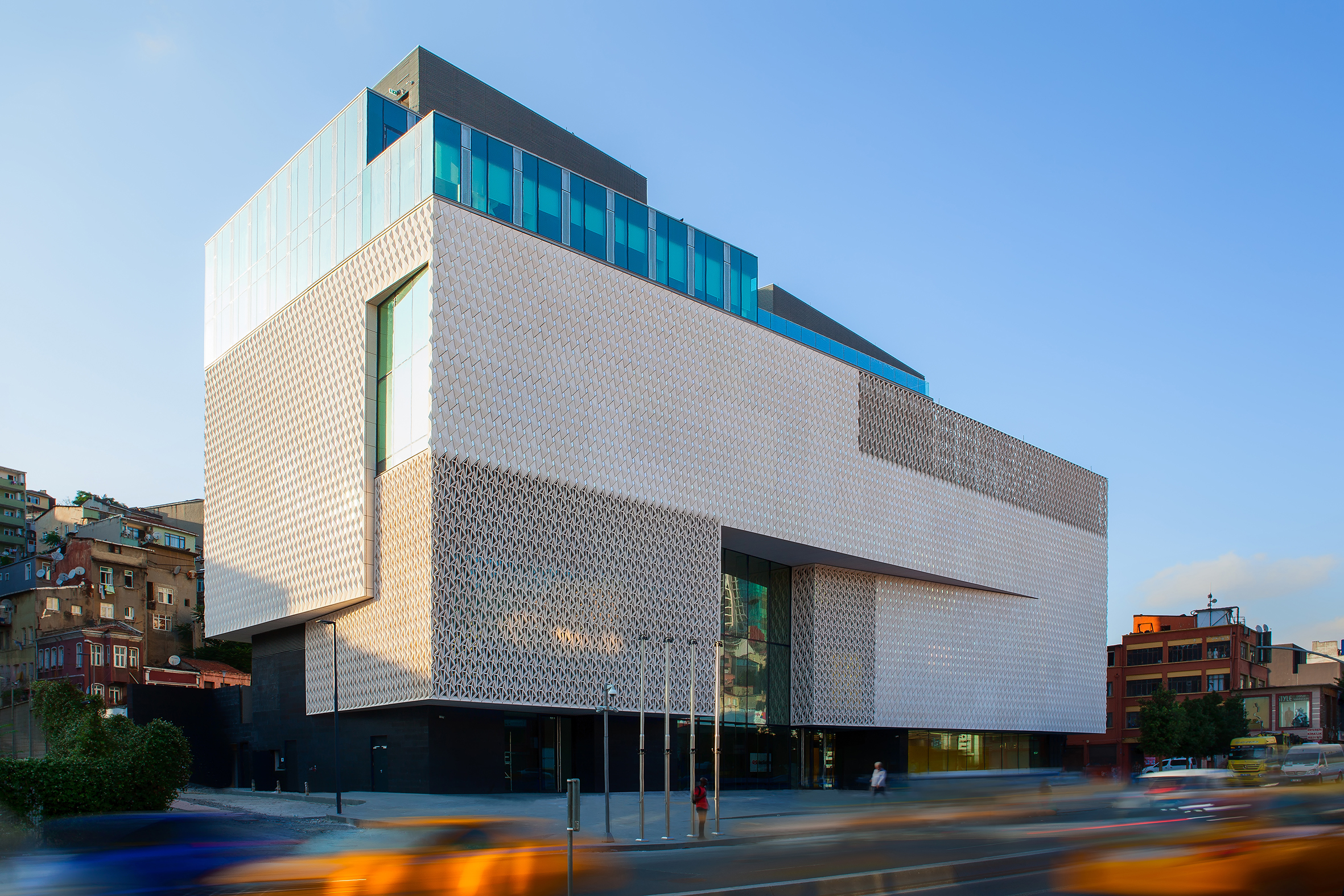
Arter's new building in Dolapdere, Istanbul

In line with its mission to support artistic production, Arter has encouraged and funded the creation of new works for each exhibition.

Furthermore, Arter hosted the Istanbul Biennial as one of the main venues for its 13th and 14th editions as well as the 4th edition of the Istanbul Design Biennial.

Dolapdere, Beyoğlu

A new building in Dolapdere, opened on 9 September 2019.

== Publications ==
Arter's programme features bilingual publications that accompany each exhibition.

In 2013, the exhibition book Aslı Çavuşoğlu: The Stones Talk, designed by Esen Karol, has been selected amongst the best 50 book designs at the 50 Books/50 Covers competition organised by AIGA and Design Observer. In 2014, the book of Füsun Onur's Through the Looking Glass exhibition, again designed by Esen Karol, has been included in the same selection. Designed by Ali Emre Doğramacı, the exhibition book Ali Mahmut Demirel: Isle has been awarded by the Turkish Graphic Designers Association (GMK) in the category of Best Book Cover Design in 2018.
