= American Hospital (Istanbul) =

VKV Amerikan Hastanesi
- Vehbi Koç Foundation

Geography
- Location: Güzelbahçe Sk. No: 20; Nişantaşı, Teşvikiye, Şişli; Istanbul, Turkey
- Coordinates: 41.053°N 28.995°E

Organisation
- Care system: Private
- Type: General

Services
- Standards: ISO 9001; ISO 14001; ISO 27001; Joint Commission International
- Emergency department: Yes
- Beds: 278

Helipads
- Helipad: Yes

History
- Former names: American Hospital of Constantinople (1920–30); American Hospital of Istanbul (1930–45, 1968–94); Admiral Bristol Hospital (1945–68)
- Opened: August 20, 1920; 105 years ago

Links
- Website: amerikanhastanesi.org
- Other links: Virtual Tour of the Hospital

The Vehbi Koç Foundation (VKV) American Hospital, known locally as Amerikan Hastanesi, is a non-profit general hospital located in the Nişantaşı area of Istanbul, Turkey.

== History ==
The hospital was founded in 1920 by Arthur L. Bristol, Rear Admiral in the US Navy, and was initially subsidized by the American Red Cross.

Lorrin A. Shepard (from 1927 to 1957) were chief physicians in the hospital. During Shepard's time at the hospital, he oversaw the planning and construction of the hospital's Nişantaşı building in 1939 and the Admiral Bristol Nursing School in 1949.

Prior to its transfer to the Vehbi Koç Foundation in 1994, the hospital's funding included financing from USAID and donations from the likes of Lila Acheson Wallace, co-founder of Reader's Digest magazine.

== Current activities ==
Today, the hospital serves over 220,000 patients annually at its 60,500 m^{2} (651,216 sq. ft) site with 278 inpatient beds, 36 intensive care beds, and 12 operating rooms. Facilities include an emergency department and helipad. The American Hospital provides specialized medical services across various fields. These include cardiology, oncology, neurology and neurosurgery, orthopedics and sports medicine, and a dedicated women’s health center.
