= Koç Holding =

Turkish industrial conglomerate

Coordinates: 41°1′55″N 29°2′14″E

Koç Holding A.Ş.
- Type: Public
- Traded as: BİST: KCHOL
- Industry: Conglomerate
- Founded: 31 May 1926; 100 years ago
- Founder: Vehbi Koç
- Headquarters: Kuzguncuk, Üsküdar, Istanbul
- Area served: Worldwide
- Key people: Ömer Koç (Chairman); Ali Koç (Vice President) Levent Cakiroglu (CEO)
- Revenue: ▲US$65.806 billion (2024) About half of the revenue through Tupras
- Operating income: ▲US$7.563 billion (2023)
- Net income: ▲US$4.001 billion (2023)
- Total assets: ▲US$123.039 billion (Q3/ 2025)
- Total equity: ▲US$25.056 billion (Q3/ 2025)
- Number of employees: 123.970 (2024)
- Subsidiaries: List: Arçelik Aygaz Ford Otosan Koçtaş KoçSistem Opet Otokar RMK Marine Tofaş Tüpraş Yapı Kredi
- Website: koc.com.tr

Koç Holding A.Ş. (Turkish pronunciation: [kotʃ]) is a Turkish multinational industrial conglomerate headquartered in Istanbul, Turkey. It operates as the country's largest company, and is listed on Fortune Global 500 as of 2024. Koç Holding's contributions make up to 7% of Turkey's overall exports. The company is controlled by the Koç family, one of Turkey's wealthiest families.

Founded in 1926 by Vehbi Koç, it is regarded as one of the pioneering actors in the industrialization of Turkey. Subsidiaries owned by Koç Holding engage in a variety of sectors, including banking, energy, automotive, household appliances, and defence.

== History ==
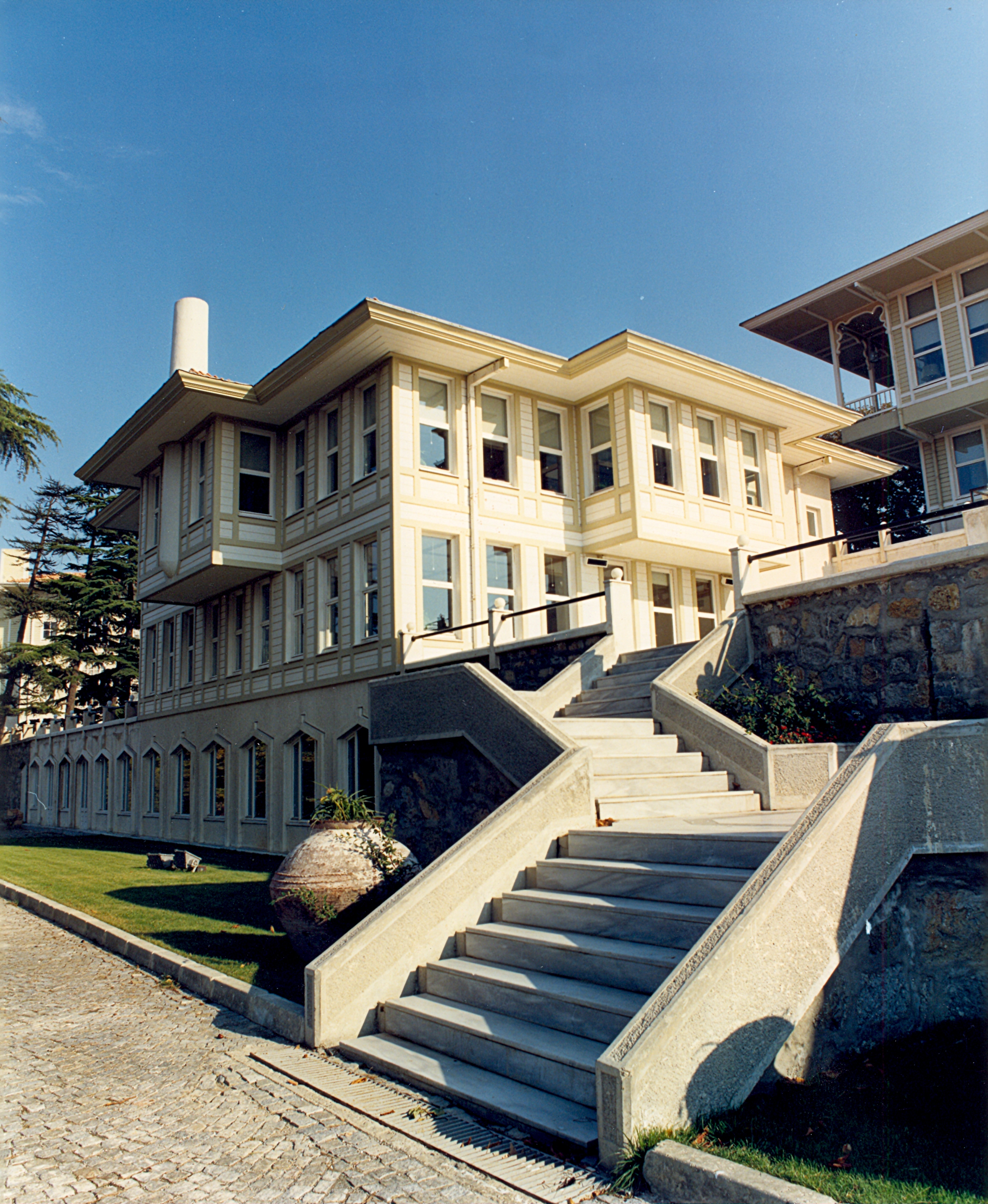
Koç Holding Corporate Headquarters in Istanbul

Koç Holding traces back to a local general store established by Vehbi Koç in Ankara, Turkey's new capital under construction. It expanded the scope of business into construction and hardware, following the city's fast-tracked development that brought economic activity. In 1963, the company was organised into its current structure after the merger of all industries run by Vehbi Koç under the name Koç Holding.

In 1984, Vehbi Koç handed his position as chairman of the board over to his son Rahmi M. Koç. In September 1988, the company moved its headquarters from Fındıklı, Istanbul, to Nakkaştepe on the Anatolian part of Istanbul. On 4 April 2003, Rahmi Koç retired and handed his position over to his eldest son Mustafa V. Koç. Rahmi Koç retained the title of honorary chairman and a seat on the board of directors. In February 2015, Levent Çakıroğlu replaced Turgay Durak as CEO. In 2016 Q1, Ömer Koç became the chairman of the board following the death of Mustafa V. Koç.

=== June 2026 attacks ===
In June 2026, Koç holding firms were targeted in a string of gunfire attacks linked to Koç holding following remarks made by Rahmi Koç, where he told a joke involving Kurdish women. Authorities detained three suspects in connection with both attacks. An armed Kurdish group known as Ertekinler claimed responsibility for the attack. The gunmen allegedly recorded the attack with their phones and shared it on social media. In the footage, one of the attackers stated; "Rahmi Koç, greetings from brother Serdar E. If the disrespect towards Kurdish women continues, these actions in Turkey will not end." Koç later made a public apology through their social media accounts, saying his remarks were not intended to target any identity. And an investigation was launched on Koç for "degrading a segment of the public" due to "expressions deemed to target women and citizens of a specific ethnic identity." AK Party spokesperson Ömer Çelik, condemned the attacks on his social media.

== Operations ==
The shares of 16 Koç Group companies are traded on the Istanbul Stock Exchange; together, the groups comprise 113 companies, with 124,000 employees, and 14,000 dealers, agencies, and after-sales services people.

=== Banking Group ===
Yapı Kredi, a Turkish financial services company operating in banking and insurance, was acquired in 2005. Following a 2006 merger, it stands as the successor to Koçbank, the company's previous financial venture.

=== Consumer Durables Group ===
Arçelik, a Turkish household appliances manufacturer, is part of the Koç Holding's sphere. The company, maintaining 46 manufacturing plants, operates in more than 100 countries. Its subsidiaries include Beko, Europe's largest in the sector, Indesit, Grundig, Arctic, and Defy. Arçelik also holds limited licenses of multinational industrial giants, such as Whirlpool and Hitachi.

=== Energy Group ===
Tüpraş, operating the vast majority of oil refineries in Turkey, makes up almost half of Koç Holding's total revenue. Prominent energy ventures owned by Koç Holding include Aygaz, which specializes in LPG, electricity and natural gas. Opet, another company subordinating to the group, maintains fuel stations throughout the country.

== Group companies ==
=== Energy ===
- Akpa A.Ş.
- Aygaz A.Ş.
- Demir Export A.Ş.: The operator of Eynez coal mine
- Ditaş Deniz İşletmeciliği ve Tankerciliği A.Ş.
- Entek Elektrik Üretimi A.Ş.
- Körfez Ulaştırma A.Ş.
- Opet Fuchs Madeni Yağ A.Ş.
- Opet Petrolcülük A.Ş.
- THY OPET Havacılık Yakıtları A.Ş.
- Tüpraş (Türkiye Petrol Rafinerileri A.Ş.)

=== Finance ===
- Koç Finansman A.Ş.
- Yapı ve Kredi Bankası A.Ş.
- Yapı Kredi Faktoring A.Ş.
- Yapı Kredi Portföy Yönetimi A.Ş.
- Yapı Kredi Finansal Kiralama A.O.
- Yapı Kredi Yatırım Menkul Değerler A.Ş.
- Yapı Kredi Kültür ve Sanat Yayıncılık Tic.ve San. A.Ş.

=== Consumer Durables ===
- Arçelik A.Ş.: The electronics and home appliances division which includes Beko, Grundig, Indesit
- Arçelik-LG Klima: JV between Arçelik and LG Electronics focused on air conditioning units
- Wat Motor San. ve Tic. A.Ş.
- Defy Appliances Ltd.

=== Automotive ===
- Ford Otomotiv San. A.Ş.
- Koç Fiat Kredi Finansman A.Ş.
- Otokar Otobüs Karoseri San. A.Ş.
- Otokar Otomotiv ve Savunma Sanayi A.Ş.
- Otokoç Otomotiv Tic. ve San. A.Ş.
- Otokoç Sigorta Aracılık Hizmetleri A.Ş.
- TOFAŞ Türk Otomobil Fabrikası A.Ş.
- Türk Traktör ve Ziraat Makinaları A.Ş.

=== Other Lines of Business ===
- Ark İnşaat A.Ş.
- Bilkom A.Ş.
- Divan Turizm İşletmeleri A.Ş.
- Düzey Tüketim A.Ş.
- Ingage Dijital Pazarlama A.Ş.
- Inventram A.Ş.
- Koç Bilgi ve Savunma Teknolojileri A.Ş.
- KoçDigital Çözümler A.Ş.
- Koçtaş Yapı Marketleri A.Ş.
- KoçSistem Bilgi ve İletişim Hizm. A.Ş.
- Ram Dış Ticaret A.Ş.
- RMK Marine Gemi Yapım Sanayi ve Deniz Taşımacılığı İşletmesi A.Ş.
- Setair Hava Taşımacılığı ve Hizm. A.Ş.
- Setur Marinaları Marina ve Yat İşletmeciliği
- Setur Servis Turistik A.Ş.
- Tanı Pazarlama ve İletişim Hizmetleri A.Ş.
- Tat Gıda Sanayi A.Ş.
- Tek-Art Kalamış ve Fenerbahçe Turizm Tesisleri A.Ş.
- Zer Merkezi Hizmetler A.Ş.
