= Vehbi Koç Foundation =

Turkish non-governmental organization

Vehbi Koç Vakfı
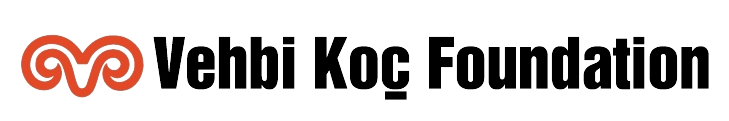

- Abbreviation: VKV
- Formation: January 17, 1969; 57 years ago
- Type: NGO
- Legal status: Foundation
- Purpose: Humanitarian in education, healthcare and culture
- Headquarters: Nakkaştepe, Kuzguncuk, Istanbul, Turkey
- Coordinates: 41.03199°N 29.03721°E
- Chairperson: Semahat Koç
- Main organ: Board of directors
- Website: www.vkv.org.tr

The Vehbi Koç Foundation (Turkish: Vehbi Koç Vakfı) is one of the biggest non-governmental charitable organizations in Turkey. It was established on January 17, 1969 by the Turkish entrepreneur and philanthropist Vehbi Koç (1901-1996). The foundation is active in the fields of education, healthcare and culture.

The board of directors is currently chaired by Semahat Arsel, the eldest daughter of Vehbi Koç. Executive committee's president is Suna Koç, another daughter. Erdal Yıldırım is the managing director of the foundation. The headquarters of the foundation is located at Nakkaştepe in Kuzguncuk, Istanbul.

== Education ==
The Vehbi Koç Foundation established Koç University, Koç School and many Koç elementary schools across the country, and a number of hospitals as well.

== Culture ==
The Vehbi Koç Foundation already runs various museums across Istanbul, including Arter, a contemporary art exhibition space, which opened in 2010. This four-storey space housed in an historic building on İstiklal Avenue is owned by Ömer Koç, the vice chairman of Koç Holding. The Sadberk Hanım Museum, based at the Azaryan Mansion in Istanbul’s northern Sariyer district, houses the private collection of Sadberk Koç, the wife of Vehbi Koç. The most recent major cultural project of the Vehbi Koç Foundation is the establishment of a contemporary art museum scheduled to be opened at the end of 2017 in Istanbul’s Dolapdere district, close to the city center.

== See also ==
- American Hospital Istanbul
- Koç University
- Koç School
- Vehbi Koç
