= H200 =

H200 or H-200 may refer to:

== Computing ==
- Honeywell 200, a 1963 computer
- Lenovo H200, a Lenovo Essential desktop
- Symphony Xplorer H200, an Android smartphone
- Nvidia H200, a graphics processing unit

== Vans ==
- Hyundai H200
- Toyota HiAce (H200)
- Toyota HiMedic (H200), a second generation Toyota HiMedic
