= Lenovo Essential =

Essential is brand used by Lenovo for some of their personal computers. It may refer to:

- Lenovo Essential desktops
- Lenovo Essential laptops
