= Electronics industry in Bangladesh =

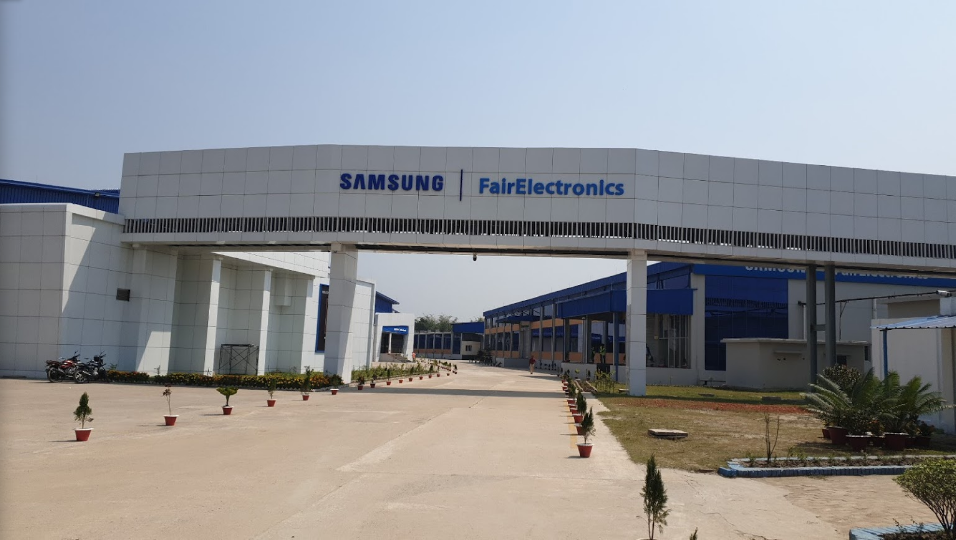
Manufacturing Plant of Fair Electronics for Samsung in Bangladesh

The electronics industry in Bangladesh is one of the fastest-growing industries in the country with great potential. Popular Bangladeshi electronics brands include Walton Electronics, Singer Bangladesh, Jamuna Electronics, Vision Electronics (PRAN-RFL Group). Local companies such as Fair Group, Butterfly Group, Electra, Rangs Group, Electro Mart, and Transcom Group manufacture and assembles Electronics Home Appliances in collaboration with foreign brands such as Samsung, Hisense, Whirlpool, LG, Sony, Gree, Konka, and Sharp.

== History ==
=== Home appliances ===
The use of electronics in Bangladesh started in the 1930s through the field of communication with the establishment of radio stations, telephone exchanges, and wireless communication. During World War II, to satisfy military needs, the technology of wireless communication was enhanced and the latest technology was introduced in the British Raj.

In 1962, a plant was set up in Dhaka to produce radio sets. In 1967, it started assembling television sets. A digital telephone system was introduced in 1983 and mobile phones came in 1992. Before 1980, most of the domestic appliances and equipment were imported, except the one-band radio, but after 1980 many assembly plants for radio, television, audio, and video cassette recorders and players were established.

Since 1990, advanced products like computers, cordless telephones, satellite TV signal-receiving equipment, etc., started to be assembled, and some spare parts also began to be manufactured. By this time, a number of multinational companies have set up assembly and manufacturing plants in the country. Local companies, in joint collaboration with foreign companies, have established assembly and manufacturing plants. At present, the total number of such companies is more than sixty. Since 1994, after Bangladesh's integration into the free market agreement, all kinds of commodities, including electronic products, began to be imported freely, which created a competitive environment. By the 2000s, few local companies began to export locally manufactured electronic home appliances abroad. Walton (Marcel), Jamuna Electronics, Vision, ViGO, Minister, etc, were the frontier leaders to start the manufacture of electronic goods in Bangladesh. After Walton, many other local companies started manufacturing electronic home appliances in the country..

Walton introduced the country's first compressor manufacturing plant in April 2017. In 2017, Samsung inaugurated two home appliances manufacturing plant in Bangladesh, in collaboration with Fair Electronics and Transcom Electronics. In 2018, LG Electronics inaugurated TV manufacturing plant in Bangladesh, in collaboration with Butterfly Group. LG also planned to open a refrigerator and air conditioner manufacturing plant in 2019. Japanese electronics brand Sharp and Fujitsu General home appliances also started their journey in Bangladesh with a local conglomerate, Esquire Electronics.

As of 2023, CEO of Walton, estimated that 95% of the refrigerator market, 85% of the AC market and 40% of the television market in the country was supported by domestic manufacturing by local and foreign brands.

=== Smartphones and high technology industries ===
On 5 October 2017, Bangladeshi conglomerate Walton inaugurated the country's first smartphone and tablet manufacturing plant named "Walton Digi-Tech Industries". Walton released its first 'Made in Bangladesh' smartphones in January 2018.

On 18 January 2018, Walton launched the country's first computer and laptop manufacturing plant.

In April 2018, Samsung announced the assembling of smartphones in Bangladesh in their new factory in collaboration with Fair Electronics, and the factory commenced production of smartphones in May 2018. Bangladeshi assembled Galaxy Note 10 | 10+ | 10 Lite reached the market in January 2020. They started full-fledged manufacturing of Samsung smartphones in the quarter of 2020.

In October 2018, Transsion Bangladesh Limited, a Bangladeshi subsidiary of Transsion Holdings, started producing smartphones in their new manufacturing factory in Bangladesh. Transsion started producing smartphones by assembling components and gradually shifted to full-fledged manufacturing of the phones labeled "Made in Bangladesh".

The country's 5th mobile manufacturing factory was launched in October by '5 Star Mobile' brand. A few more companies were also setting up their smartphone factories in Bangladesh, which had production plans in the first quarter of 2019. International brands like Huawei and Lava have shown their interest to set up smartphone manufacturing plants in Bangladesh within the next couple of years.

In July 2019, Vivo inaugurated their new manufacturing plant in Rupganj Upazila, Narayanganj.

In November 2019, Chinese smartphone brand Oppo launched a new manufacturing plant in Gazipur in partnership with local company Benli Electronic Enterprise Co Limited.

In February 2020, Realme inaugurated their new smartphone manufacturing plant in Gazipur.

In September 2021, Nokia started production of smartphones in their new manufacturing plant in collaboration with Vibrant Software Bangladesh Ltd in Bangabandhu Hi-Tech City, Gazipur.

In October 2021, Xiaomi opened their first Bangladeshi manufacturing plant in Gazipur, partnering with DBG Technology BD Ltd, an electronics manufacturing service provider headquartered at Huizhou, Guangdong in China.

In May 2023, Transsion opened a new factory in Meghna Industrial Economic Zone, Narayanganj with $22 million investment in the first phase.

=== Semiconductor Industry ===
Industry-academic collaboration is increasing to unify ecosystems of the industry with leadership from BSIA (Bangladesh Semiconductor Industry Association).

== Market size ==
As of November 2020, the industry was estimated to be worth ৳26700 crore (US$2.2 billion), with a yearly growth rate of 11%. As of 2024, locally manufactured and assembled televisions had a 90% market share, 70% to 75% air conditioners (AC) were manufactured locally and 80% domestic demands of refrigerators were met by local manufacturers. Home appliances sold in Bangladesh in 2021 was estimated to be worth $2.4 Billion and is expected to rise to $10 billion by 2030. Consumer electronics sales are expected to be around $5.17 billion by 2025.

== Electronics manufacturing plants in Bangladesh ==
Serial No	Manufacturer	Factory Location	Produced Products	Citations
1	Walton	Kaliakoir Upazila, Gazipur	Home appliance, Smartphone, Feature-phones, Computer, Computer hardware, Chargers & Gas stoves	
2	Samsung (Technical Collaboration with Fair Electronics)	Shibpur Upazila, Narshingdi	Home appliance & Smartphone	
3	Samsung (Technical Collaboration with Transcom Electronics)	Mohakhali, Dhaka	Television assembling	
4	Minister Hi-Tech Park	Gazipur & Trishal Upazila, Mymensingh	Home appliance	
5	Jamuna Electronics	Gazipur	Home appliance	
6	Sony (Technical Collaboration with Rangs Electronics)	Companiganj Upazila, Sylhet Hi-Tech Park	Television, Air conditioning, Refrigerator & Home appliance	
7	LG (Technical Collaboration with Butterfly Group)	Bhaluka Upazila, Mymensingh	Television & Refrigerator	
8	Vision Electronics	Narshingdi	Television, & Home appliance	
9	RANCON ASTRA TOSHIN TOSHIBA	Bhobanipur Kashimpur Gazipur	Television, Refrigerator & Home appliance	
10	Symphony Mobile (Edison Group)	Bangabandhu Hi-Tech City, Gazipur	Smartphones Feature phone & Chargers	
10	Oppo	Vogra, Gazipur	Smartphone	
11	Vivo	Rupganj Upazila, Narayanganj	Smartphone	
12	Realme	Vogra, Gazipur	Smartphone	
13	MNH Industries Ltd.	Barishal, Barishal	Television & Refrigerator	
14	Singer Bangladesh	Savar, Dhaka	Home appliance	
16	5 Star Mobile	Bangladesh	Smartphone and feature phones	
17	Xiaomi, Redmi and POCO (Technical Collaboration with DBG Technology BD Ltd.)	Gazipur	Smartphones	
18	Nokia-HMD (Technical Collaboration with Vibrant Software)	Bangabandhu Hi-Tech City, Gazipur	Smartphones & Feature phone	
19	Transsion Holdings	Vogra, Gazipur	Smartphone	
20	Miyako	Plot 50, Sector 3, Uttara, Dhaka 1230	Home appliance	
21	Haiko (Electro Mart)	Sonargaon Upazila	Television, Refrigerator, Air conditioning, & Home appliance	
22	Transsion Holdings	Narayanganj	Smartphone	
23	Proton by Pran-RFL	Palash, Narsindi	Feature-phone and Smartphone	
24	OnePlus	Vogra Bypass, Gazipur	Smartphone	
