= Bauknecht =

Bauknecht may refer to:

== Surnames ==
- Philipp Bauknecht (1884-1933), German Expressionist painter
- Gottlob Bauknecht (1892-1976), German engineer
- Bernhard Bauknecht (1900-1985), German politician

== Companies ==
- Bauknecht (company)
