= Paramedic (disambiguation) =

A paramedic is a healthcare professional who works predominantly in the pre-hospital and out-of-hospital environment.

Paramedic(s) or The Paramedic(s) may also refer to:

== Film and TV ==
- The Paramedic, a 2020 Spanish psychological thriller film directed by Carles Torras
- Paramedics (Australian TV series), a 2018 Australian factual television series
- Paramedics (film), a 1988 comedy film
- Paramedics (U.S. TV series), a 1998 spin-off factual television series of Trauma: Life in the E.R.

== Other uses ==
- "Paramedic!", a song from the soundtrack of the 2018 film Black Panther
- Nissan Paramedic, an ambulance

== See also ==
- Paramedico, a film and book by Benjamin Gilmour
