= Waggonfabrik Rastatt =

German manufacturer of tram and railway vehicles

BWR Wagon Repair Company
- Native name: BWR Waggonreparatur GmbH
- Company type: GmbH
- Industry: Railway vehicles and trams
- Founded: 1897
- Fate: Active
- Headquarters: Rastatt, Germany
- Key people: Josef Schwerthöfer, General Manager
- Products: Railway vehicles
- Website: www.bwr.de

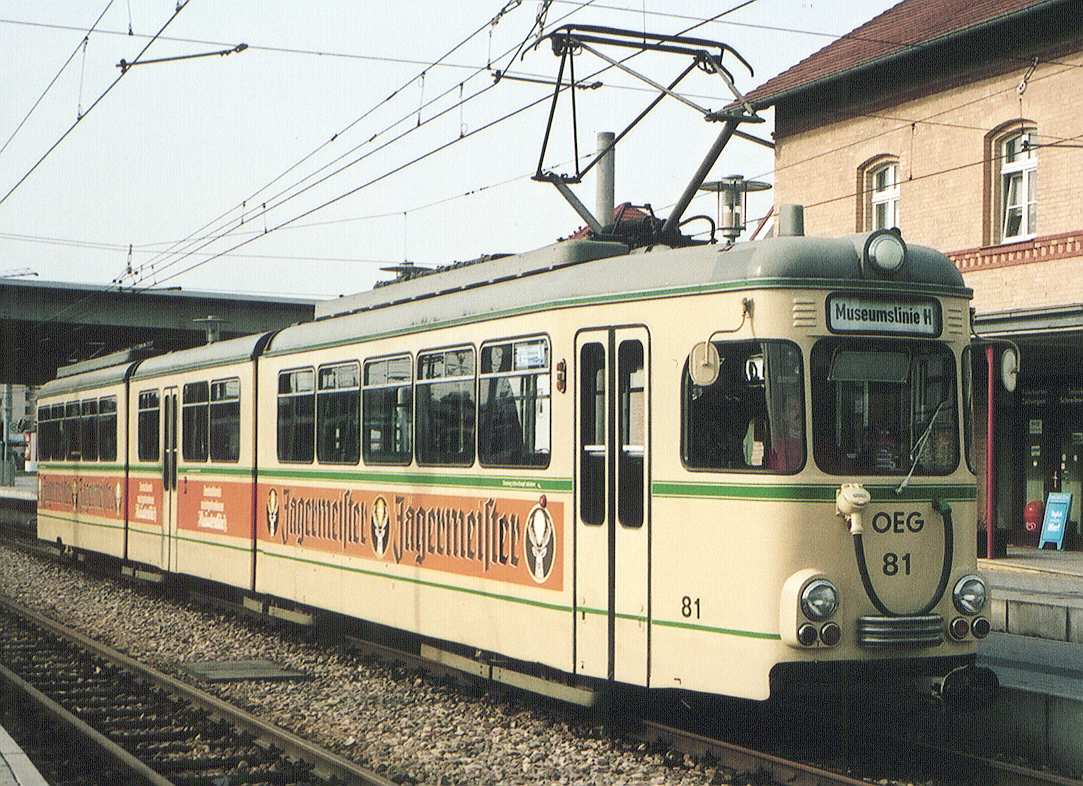
A Gt8 tram, built in 1963, on the Upper Rhine Railway (OEG)

Waggonfabrik Rastatt (English: Rastatt Coach Factory) is a German public-limited company based in Rastatt in the state of Baden-Württemberg in southwestern Germany. Its chief products are tramway vehicles and railway coaches and wagons. The firm was founded in 1897 and built, for example, tramways for the Upper Rhine Railway Company (Oberrheinische Eisenbahn-Gesellschaft or OEG), Karlsruhe Transport Company (Verkehrsbetriebe Karlsruhe GmbH) and Stuttgart Tramways (Stuttgarter Straßenbahnen AG). In its early days it also built rolling stock for the Grand Duchy of Baden State Railways.

After the acquisition of the majority of shares by Bauknecht the coach factory in 1971 was converted into a limited liability company (GmbH) and its production was refocussed on the repair and conversion of wagons. After several name changes and takeovers, especially due to the bankruptcy of Bauknecht, it finally became the 'BWR Wagon Repair Company' (German: BWR Waggonreparatur GmbH).
