= V55 =

V55 may refer to:

- Jiabao V55, a Chinese microvan
- Symphony Xplorer V55, a smartphone
- Vanadium-55, an isotope of vanadium
