= Singer Bangladesh =

Bangladeshi manufacturing company

Singer Bangladesh Limited
- Singer Bangladesh's Logo
- Trade name: SINGERBD
- Native name: সিঙ্গার বাংলাদেশ লি.
- Type: Public limited company
- Industry: Consumer Goods; Home Appliances; Electronics; Furniture
- Founded: 1905; 121 years ago
- Headquarters: Gulshan Center Point, House # 23-26 (21st Floor), Road # 90-91, Gulshan-2, Dhaka, Bangladesh
- Number of locations: 405 Retail Outlet; 974 Dealers Points (2017)
- Area served: Bangladesh
- Products: Air conditioners; Desktop computers; Air coolers; Deep freezers; Refrigerators; Laptops; Washing machines; Electric ovens; Fans; Gas burners; Clothes irons; Kitchen appliances; Microwave ovens; Water heaters; Water purifiers; Smartphones; LED/Smart televisions; Voltage stabilizers; Furniture
- Brands: Beko; Samsung; Dell; HP; Galanz; Grundig; Videocon; Singtech; Skyworth; Symphony; Singer Furniture
- Services: Financeing; Western Union; Hire Purchase; Utility Bill
- Revenue: BDT 15.05 billion▼ ($177.95 millions) (2020)
- Total assets: ▲US$186 million (2020)
- Total equity: ▲US$50 million (2020)
- Number of employees: ▲1,767 (2020)
- Parent: Arçelik and Retail Holdings NV
- Subsidiaries: International Appliances ltd
- Website: https://singerbd.com

Singer Bangladesh Ltd. (Bengali: সিঙ্গার বাংলাদেশ লি.) is a Bangladeshi sewing machine manufacturer. It started while Bangladesh was a part of the British Raj. In addition to sewing machines, Singer Bangladesh manufactured consumer electronics.

== History ==
Singer Bangladesh began in 1905. In 1920, two shops were set up in Dhaka and Chittagong. In 1947, after the Partition of the sub-continent, now Bangladesh became East Pakistan. Singer in East Pakistan operated as a branch of Singer Pakistan and the products used to come from West Pakistan. Initially, only 10 shops were set up, which grew to 43 by the late 1960s.

After the Bangladesh War of Independence, Bangladesh Singer had to limit its operation to 23 stores and the branch office was promoted to country office. A change in the investment policy in 1979 created new business opportunities and Singer registered as an operating company.

A sewing machine manufacturing factory with 10,000 units per year capacity was established in 1980 in Chittagong. Capacity increased to 25,000 units per year in 1989. Although sewing machines are Singer's core business, management realized that for sustainable growth in the long run it had to diversify its product line. This realization led to diversification.

In 1985, Singer began transforming from a single product into a multi-product consumer durable company.

In 1993, the company established an audio-video plant and in 1996, a washing machine factory.

In 2001, the company initiated assembling of motorcycles and in 2006, manufacturing of wire and cable (domestic and power cables).

In March 2019, Arçelik and Retail Holdings NV acquired Singer Bangladesh ltd. buying 57% of its shares.

== Corporate social responsibility ==
As part of the 'Singer for Society' program, Singer Bangladesh Limited donated ventilators to three hospitals in and outside Dhaka for critical COVID-19 patients. They donated refrigerators, washing machines and microwave ovens to hospitals across the country to protect hospital staff during the pandemic.
