= Arctic S.A. =

Romanian household appliances producer

- Company type: Private
- Industry: Household appliances
- Founded: 1970
- Headquarters: Găești, Dâmbovița, Romania
- Key people: Murat Büyükerk (General Manager)
- Revenue: ▲$300 million EURO
- Net income: 15,600,000 euro (2018)
- Number of employees: 3,000
- Parent: Arçelik Group
- Website: http://www.arctic.ro/

Arctic S.A. is the largest Romanian household appliances producer and one of the largest refrigerator producers in Europe. It is located in Găești, Dâmbovița County. The company was bought in 2002 by the largest household appliances manufacturer in Turkey, Arçelik. The company has a production capacity of 2.6 million refrigerators per year. Its products are also made in Russia and Turkey and some Beko fridges are built in this plant.

Company Financial Information - Arctic S.A.
Years	Revenues	Expenses	Profit	Inventory	Reserves	Receivables	Payables	Bank and Cash	Employees
2021	3588507064	3517093491	-72614191	473907124	12766969	862880270	1395521399	17621428	4315
2020	2872454278	2591632308	121280866	278314673	12609740	779363806	1122303748	105047240	3604
2019	2704062855	2477851181	47621421	397731264	25370040	735369781	1159292967	13376307	3505
2018	2496434962	2232111199	82436901	365965973	24912025	721038467	1082814946	13543241	3034
2017	2378866616	2113943974	81055736	313141542	22512427	683301402	518940681	132712676	2822
2016	2098262221	1873193776	200139540	263093134	22521167	474377646	374902684	344980073	2791
