= Dawlance =

Pakistani home appliances brand

- Type: Private
- Industry: Electronics and Home Appliances
- Founded: 1980; 46 years ago
- Founder: Bashir Dawood
- Headquarters: Karachi, Pakistan
- Area served: Pakistan
- Key people: Hakan Bulgurlu, Umar Ahsan Khan
- Products: Refrigerators, Air Conditioners, Deep Freezers, Washing Machines, Vacuum Cleaners, Dishwashers, Water Dispensers, Microwave Ovens, Small Kitchen Appliances, Kitchen Hoods, Gas Hobs & Built-in Ovens
- Revenue: $220.6 million
- Owner: Koç Holding AŞ
- Number of employees: 4000
- Parent: Arçelik
- Website: dawlance.com.pk

Dawlance is a Pakistani home appliances brand which is a wholly-owned subsidiary of Turkish company Arçelik. It is based in Karachi. Founded in 1980, it was acquired by Istanbul-based Arçelik in 2016.

Dawlance has three factories, two sites in Karachi and one in Hyderabad, with a total of 4,000 employees. It manufactures airfryers, washing machines, freezers, split air conditioner and microwave ovens.

== History ==
Dawlance was founded in 1980 by Bashir Dawood, a member of Dawood family, as a manufacturer of refrigerators. In 1988, the company expanded its product line by introducing deep freezers.

In the mid-1990s, Dawlance began manufacturing air conditioners, microwave ovens, washing machines and water dispensers in Pakistan.

In 2015, Dawlance had a revenue of $220.6 million selling product's in Pakistan and Middle East. Similarly, its EBITDA earnings amounted to $45 million. It has 37 branches in addition to 750-plus franchises across the country

In November 2016, it was acquired by Arçelik for $258m, and since then functions as a wholly owned brand for Arçelik. The acquisition was carried out by Ardutch BV, a subsidiary of Arçelik, which purchased United Refrigeration (Private) Limited and Dawlance (Private) Limited from Bashir and Mariyam Dawood for $148 million, and Dawlance Electronics (Private) Limited from Pan Asia Equity Limited, based in the British Virgin Islands, for $94 million.

The acquisition drew attention due to the significant increase in the value of Dawlance Electronics, which had been sold to Pan Asia Equity Limited by Bashir Dawood in 2013 for just $3.3 million. The State Bank of Pakistan sought clarifications regarding the rapid appreciation in the company's value and the potential involvement of Dawood with Pan Asia Equity Limited.

Following the acquisition, the State Bank of Pakistan temporarily froze Dawood's bank accounts, holding over 19 billion rupees, due to concerns under the Anti-Money Laundering Act. Dawood's name had also appeared in the International Consortium of Investigative Journalists' "offshore leaks", which highlighted his connection to Golden Lake Ventures Group Inc in the British Virgin Islands, adding to the controversies surrounding the business transactions.
