= Hakan Bulgurlu =

Turkish-Norwegian Business Executive

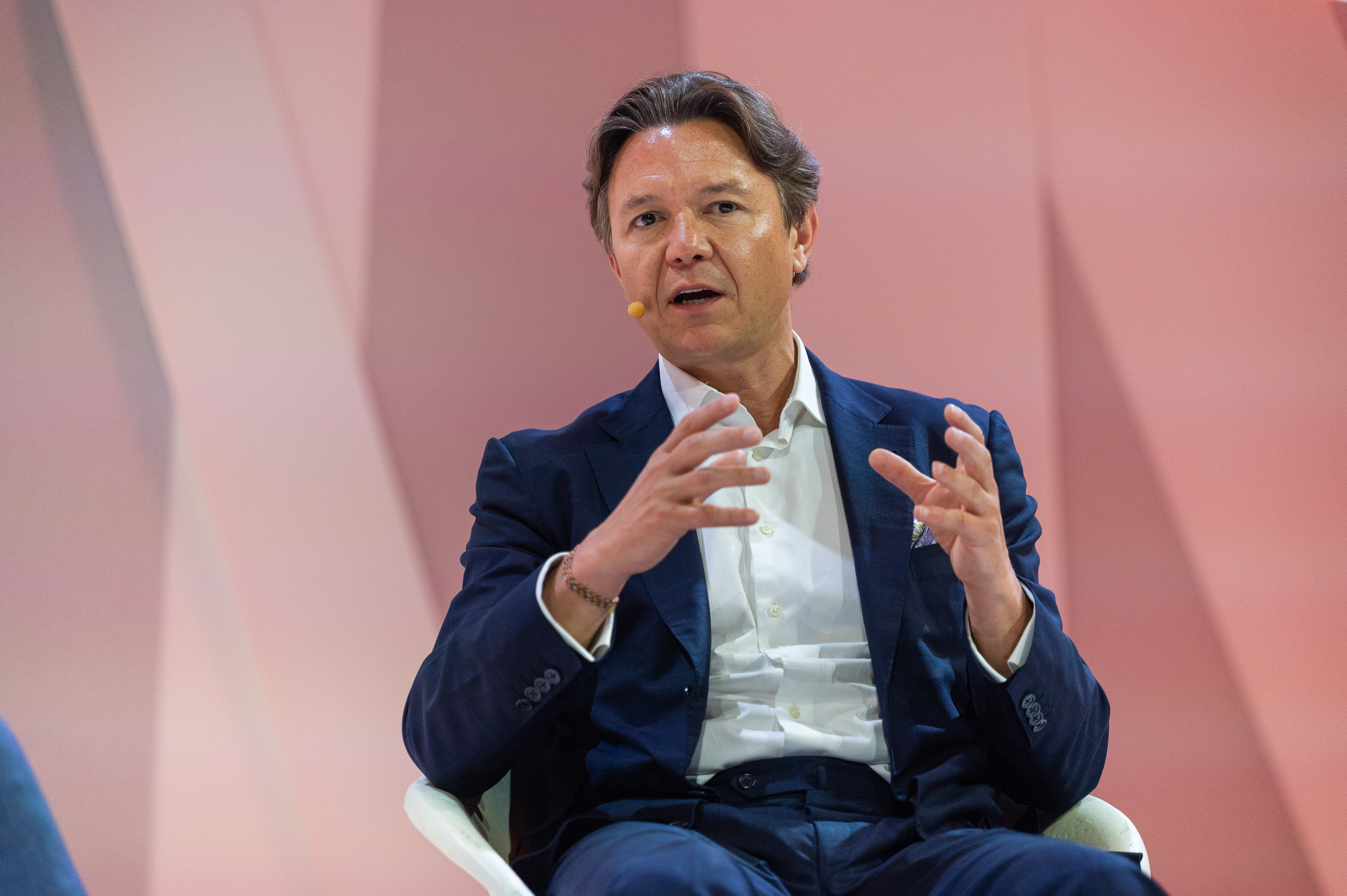
- Born: September 1972 (age 53–54); Oslo, Norway
- Education: University of Texas, Hong Kong University of Science and Technology
- Occupations: Author and businessperson
- Known for: Former CEO of Beko
- Notable work: A Mountain to Climb: The Climate Crisis, A Summit Beyond Everest

Hakan Bulgurlu (born September 1972) is a Turkish-Norwegian business executive. He was Chief Executive Officer of Beko from 2015 until 2026. In February 2026, it was announced that he would step down from the role.

Bulgurlu is the member of the World Economic Forum's CEO Climate Leaders Alliance and has authored a book A Mountain to Climb: The Climate Crisis, A Summit Beyond Everest, about his Everest expedition. He was the president of Home Appliance Europe until June 2026

== Early life and education ==
Hakan Bulgurlu was born on September 1972 in Oslo. Bulgurlu earned a degree in Mechanical Engineering and Economics from the University of Texas and obtained an MBA from the Hong Kong University of Science and Technology (HKUST).

== Career ==
In 1994, Bulgurlu began his career at Koç Holding where he held different management positions focused on international expansion.

From 2007 to 2010, he was CEO of Arçelik LG, a joint venture air conditioner manufacturer in Turkey. He joined Arçelik in 2010 as Chief Commercial Officer.

In 2015, Bulgurlu was appointed Chief Executive Officer of Arçelik. His leadership period has included international acquisitions, joint ventures, and a focus on environmental sustainability.

In April 2024, Arçelik and Whirlpool Corporation entered into a joint venture agreement to create Beko Europe.

In February 2026, Beko announced that Bulgurlu would step down as Chief Executive Officer, to be succeeded by Can Dinçer.

== Publications and thought leadership ==
Bulgurlu has been involved in the sustainability program of Arçelik (Beko), including initiatives related to emissions reduction. He is a member of the World Economic Forum's CEO Climate Leaders Alliance. Bulgurlu is President of APPLiA, a Brussels-based association representing the home appliance industry in Europe. In 2022, he published A Mountain to Climb: The Climate Crisis, A Summit Beyond Everest, a book about his Everest expedition and issues related to climate change.

He has appeared on podcasts such as The Dr. Mark Hyman Show, Thought Economics, and Dr. Mark Goulston.

== Environmental advocacy ==
Bulgurlu has participated in climate action related expeditions focusing on issues such as global warming, sea level rise and glacial melt. In 2019, he climbed Mount Everest. In late 2023, he climbed Mount Vinson in Antarctica, and completed a ski expedition to the South Pole, reported as the first Turkish citizen to do so.

He is president of the Mediterranean Archaeology Association. He is a founding member of Mediterranean Conservation Society and also a member of Young presidents' Organization.
