= Benjamin Greenacre =

English-born South African politician and businessman

Sir Benjamin Wesley Greenacre (24 December 1833 – 22 April 1911) was an English-born South African politician and businessman who was member of the Legislative Assembly of the Colony of Natal. He was a three-time Mayor of Durban.

He was knighted in 1901.

Greenacre was born into "humble circumstances" in Caistor, Norfolk, the son of Benjamin Greenacre, a shoemaker, and Jemima Mallet. In the 1850s, he moved to Durbana and opened a hardware store. He ran a successful trading business with his department store Harvey, Greenacre, & Co. In 1905, he cofounded another business that would become Defy Appliances, South Africa's largest appliance company.

In 1863, he married Mary Stott, with whom he had two sons, Walter and Edwin. Walter Greenacre also served as Mayor of Durban, in 1909–10. Sir Benjamin died in Durban.
