= Symphony Mobile =

Bangladeshi mobile-phone business

- Industry: Consumer electronics
- Founded: 2008
- Founder: Aminur Rashid
- Headquarters: Dhaka, Bangladesh
- Area served: South Asia
- Products: Smartphone; Feature phone Tablets; Earphones; Battery charger Mobile phone accessories
- Number of employees: 16,000+
- Parent: Edison Group
- Subsidiaries: Helio Mobile
- Website: https://symphony-mobile.com

Symphony Mobile (or Symphony) is a mobile phone manufacturing company based in Bangladesh.

== History ==
Symphony Mobile launched in 2008 as a rebranded Chinese company. At the end of 2012, the company released its first Android-powered mobile phone. In 2014, Symphony launched the Roar A50, one of the first phones in the Android One lineup, which ran near-stock versions of Android.

The company began assembling mobile phones at its facility in Jirabo, Ashulia, Bangladesh in 2018. By late 2020, Symphony expanded its manufacturing capabilities to include phone motherboard production in Bangladesh.

== Products ==
Symphony Mobile exclusively markets mobile phones. While historically most phones were imported from China, the company now manufactures devices in its Bangladesh factories. Their product lineup includes:

- General multimedia phones
- Java supported mobile phones
- Android smartphones

== List of phone models ==
=== Explorer Series ===
- Symphony Xplorer ZV
- Symphony Xplorer V55
- Symphony Xplorer H200
- Symphony Explorer W20
- Symphony Explorer W68
- Symphony Explorer i10
- Symphony Explorer W92

=== Z Series ===
- Symphony Z15
- Symphony Z30
- Symphony Z50
- Symphony Z35
- Symphony Z40
- Symphony Z33
- Symphony Z60 Plus
- Symphony Z70
- Symphony Z72

=== Other models ===
- Symphony P6
- Symphony H Series
- Symphony H300
- Symphony I99
- Symphony I32

== See also ==
- List of mobile phone brands by country
