= Arçelik =

Turkish household appliances manufacturer

Arçelik A.Ş.
- Type: Public
- Traded as: BİST: ARCLK
- Industry: Consumer electronics, Home appliances
- Genre: Electronics
- Founded: 1955; 71 years ago
- Founder: Vehbi Koç
- Headquarters: Sütlüce, Beyoğlu, Istanbul, Turkey
- Area served: Worldwide
- Key people: Rahmi Koç (chairman); Hakan Bulgurlu (CEO)
- Products: TV sets, refrigerators, washing machines, vacuum cleaners, air conditioners, DVD players, Blu-ray players, home cinema systems, movie projectors, laptops, CD and DVD drives, computer monitors, EV chargers
- Revenue: ▲US$13.28 billion (2024)
- Operating income: ▼US$206 million (2024)
- Net income: ▼US$49 million (2024)
- Total assets: ▼US$11.52 billion (2024)
- Total equity: ▲US$2.17 billion (2024)
- Number of employees: about 55,000
- Parent: Koç Holding
- Website: www.arcelikglobal.com

Arçelik A.Ş. (Turkish pronunciation: [aɾtʃeˈlic]) is a Turkish multinational household appliances manufacturer.

The company engages in the production, marketing and after-sale services of durable goods and their components. Its products include white goods (such as refrigerators, freezers, washing machines, dishwashers) and small home appliances (such as vacuum cleaners, coffee makers and blenders).

Arçelik A.Ş. is active in more than 100 countries, including China and the United States through its 13 international subsidiaries and over 4,500 branches in Turkey. The company operates 15 production plants in Turkey, Romania, Russia, China, South Africa and Thailand including refrigerator, washing machine, dishwasher, cooking appliances and components plants. It offers products under its own brand names, including Arçelik, Beko, Grundig, Dawlance, Altus, Blomberg, Arctic, Defy, Leisure, Arstil, Elektra Bregenz and Flavel.

The company is controlled by Koç Holding, Turkey's largest industrial and services group with USD 24.9 billion in consolidated revenues in the first half of 2023, and is the market leader in Turkey's appliance sector with its Arçelik and Beko brands. Following the merger of European activities with Whirlpool Corporation, Beko Europe became the largest household appliances company in Europe, ahead of BSH Hausgeräte and Electrolux based on production volumes.

It has been reported that as of April 2024, the company will continue its activities in the global market under the name Beko Corporate.

== History ==
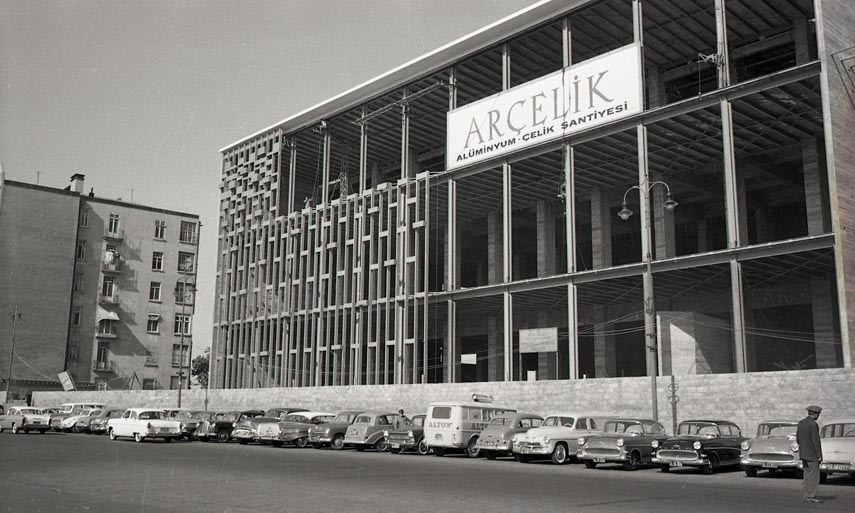
Istanbul Atatürk Cultural Center construction of the aluminium facade, 1960s.

Arçelik A.Ş. was founded in 1955 by Lütfü Doruk in partnership with Vehbi Koç operating in the Turkish home appliances industry. Arçelik produced its first washing machine in 1959 and its first refrigerator in 1960 at its manufacturing plant in Çayırova, Istanbul.

In 1986, Arçelik A.Ş. went public on Borsa Istanbul.

In 1999, Arçelik and LG Electronics founded the joint-venture Arçelik-LG Klima Sanayi ve Ticaret A.Ş. for manufacturing air conditioning units for the Turkish and global markets.

In 2006, Koç Holding decided to merge their subsidiaries in the home appliances industry under the roof of Arçelik A.Ş. These companies included the Atılım ve Gelişim Pazarlama A.Ş. which marketed Arçelik branded products, Beko Elektronik A.Ş. which marketed Beko branded products and Türk Elektrik Endüstrisi A.Ş. which produced engines and compressors for Arçelik and Beko branded products. The new organization model enabled the company to manage production and sales/marketing activities centrally and to increase productivity.

Arçelik A.Ş. made a series of acquisitions to grow its global presence: Blomberg (2002), Elektra Bregenz (2002), Leisure (2002), Flavel (2002), Arctic (2002), Grundig (2007), Defy (2011), Dawlance (2017), Singer (2019). It also partnered with other multinationals to form alliances: Tata Group in India, Hitachi in several Asia-Pacific markets and Whirlpool Corporation in several European markets.

== Global presence ==
In a bid to become a leading appliance manufacturer with a global presence, Arçelik has pursued both organic and inorganic growth. Arçelik is recognized in most markets by its Beko brand, while its portfolio also contains smaller local brands.

EMEA Region

In 2002, Arçelik made a series of acquisitions to grow its presence in the EMEA region: German and Austrian operations of Groupè Brandt which owned Blomberg and Elektra Bregenz brands, UK-based Leisure and Flavel brands and Romanian appliance maker Arctic S.A.

In 2004, Arçelik acquired German TV and home appliance maker Grundig in a partnership with Alba plc. In 2007, Arçelik became the sole-owner of the Grundig Multimedia B.V. and its eponymous brand.

To increase brand recognition, Beko became the sponsor of Watford F.C. during the 2007-2008 and the 2008–2009 seasons. Beko has also been among the sponsors of FC Barcelona between 2014 - 2022 and AFC Ajax from 2026.

In 2011, Arçelik acquired South Africa’s largest appliance maker Defy from Franke for $327M.

In 2022, Whirlpool Corporation has made a strategic review on its EMEA operations due to lower EBIT margins. This resulted in a series of transactions between Arçelik and Whirlpool.

1. Arçelik acquired Whirlpool’s operations in the Middle East and Africa for €20M.
2. Arçelik acquired Whirlpool’s Turkish manufacturing plants for €78.3M. These plants have an annual production capacity of 1.3 million freezers and 1.4 million washing machines.
3. Arçelik acquired Whirlpool’s operations in Russia and several other Commonwealth of Independent States (CIS) countries on the wake of Russian invasion of Ukraine. Arçelik is expected to make a series of deferred payments over a 10-year period capped at €220M, based on the net asset value of the business.
4. Arçelik and Whirlpool decided to merge their European operations under one entity Beko Europe, which will be held 75% by Arçelik and 25% by Whirlpool. This new entity will have 11 plants across Italy, UK, Poland, Romania and Slovakia. Bauknecht and other brands are now subordinate to Beko.

APAC Region

In 2015, Arçelik’s first plant in the region started production in Thailand. The plant has a production capacity of 300,000 units per year and is configured to the needs of the Southeast Asian market.

In 2017, Arçelik acquired Pakistan’s Dawlance for $243M.

In 2017, Arçelik and Tata Group has announced a new partnership. Arçelik and Voltas will form a joint-venture in India named Voltbek Home Appliances Ltd. This entity will provide manufacturing, sales, and after-sales services for VoltasBeko branded home appliances (refrigerators, washing machines microwaves, etc.) in India. The partners set an ambitious target to reach $1B revenue and exceed 10% market share in the Indian market over ten years.

In 2019, Arçelik acquired a 57% stake in Singer Bangladesh for $75M.

In 2021, Arçelik and Hitachi Global Life Solutions has announced a new partnership. Hitachi GLS will transfer 11 subsidiaries outside Japan (two manufacturing and nine sales companies) into Arçelik Hitachi Home Appliances B.V. and sell a 60% stake in this entity to Arçelik for $343M. This entity will provide manufacturing, sales, and after-sales services for Hitachi branded home appliances (refrigerators, washing machines and vacuum cleaners, etc.) outside Japan.

In April 2026, Arçelik sold its stake in Arçelik Hitachi Home Appliances JV for $261M following Nojima Corporation’s acquisition of Hitachi’s consumer appliances unit.

== Brands ==
- Turkey: Altus, Arçelik, Beko, Grundig
- EMEA Region: Altus, Arctic, Ariston, Bauknecht, Beko, Blomberg, Defy, Elektra Bregenz, Flavel, Hotpoint*, Grundig, Indesit, Ignis, Leisure, Polar, Privileg, Whirlpool*
- APAC Region: Beko, Dawlance, Singer*, Voltas Beko

*Licenses limited to certain jurisdictions

== Technology and innovations ==
Arçelik has 17 R&D centers globally. Some of its innovative products include the first automated Turkish coffee maker Telve, the first washing machine in the industry made from recycled materials and tumble dryer with pet hair removal.

As of 2022, Arçelik is #67 on WIPO’s ranking for "Companies That Filed the Most International Patent Applications" and is the only entrant to the list from Turkey.

== Sustainability ==
Arçelik A.Ş. was chosen among the first 15 companies to be accepted into the Borsa Istanbul Sustainability Index in 2014. It has been accepted to the FTSE4Good Emerging Market Index in 2016.

- CDP: Arçelik has been recognized for leadership in corporate transparency and performance on Water Security with an A score and on Climate Change with an A− score by the global environmental non-profit CDP.
- Dow Jones Sustainability Index: Arçelik has achieved 87/100 in the S&P Global Corporate Sustainability Assessment (CSA) as of 21 October 2022. For the fourth consecutive year, Arçelik achieved the highest score out of 46 companies assessed in the DHP Household Durables Industry based on the results of 16 December 2022.
- EcoVadis: Arçelik has obtained a score of 70/100 and has been awarded a Gold EcoVadis Medal in 2022 for this achievement. This places Arçelik in the top 2% of companies rated by EcoVadis in the manufacture of domestic appliances industry.

== Gallery ==
Old brand logo

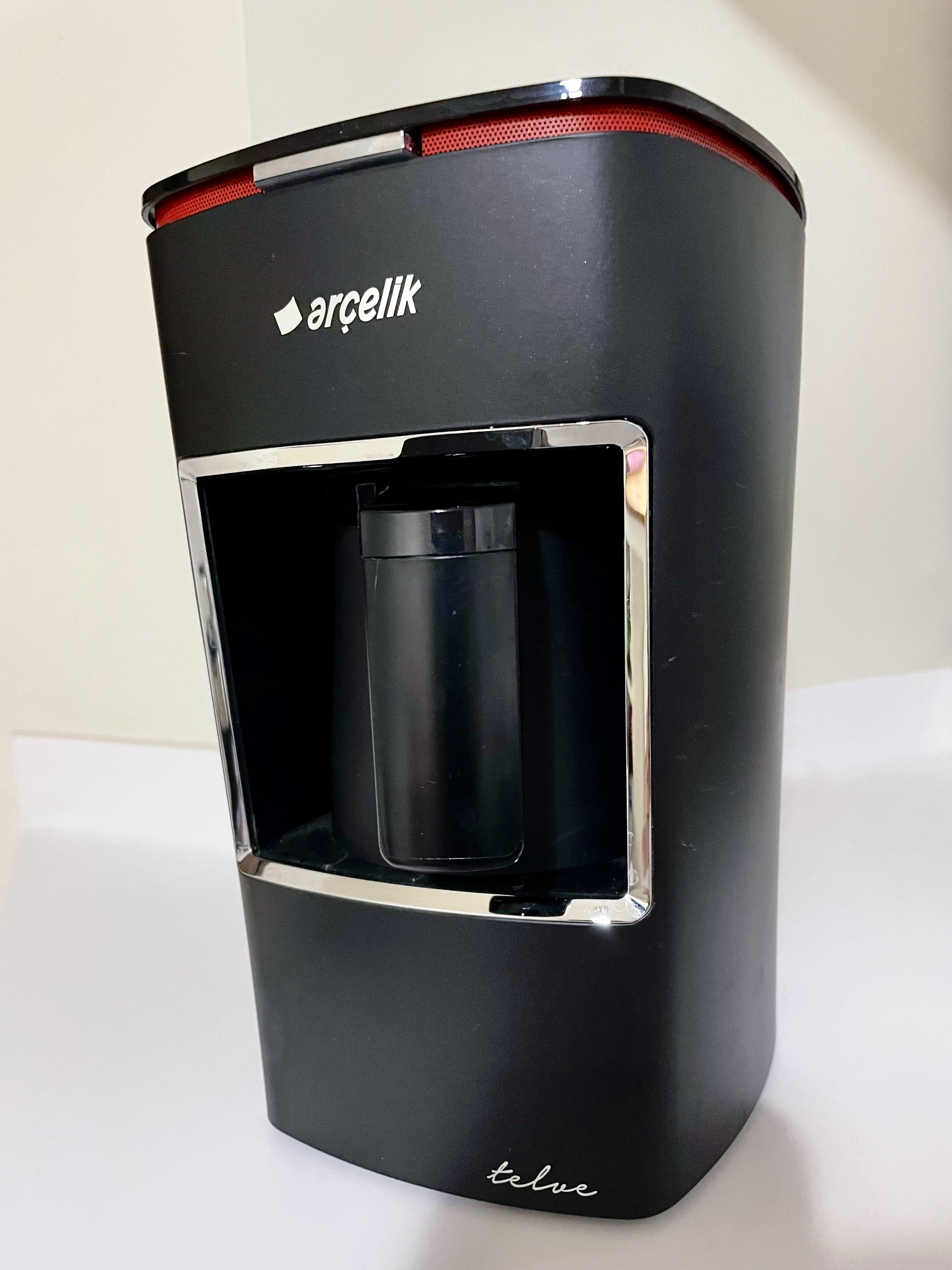
Telve Turkish coffee machine

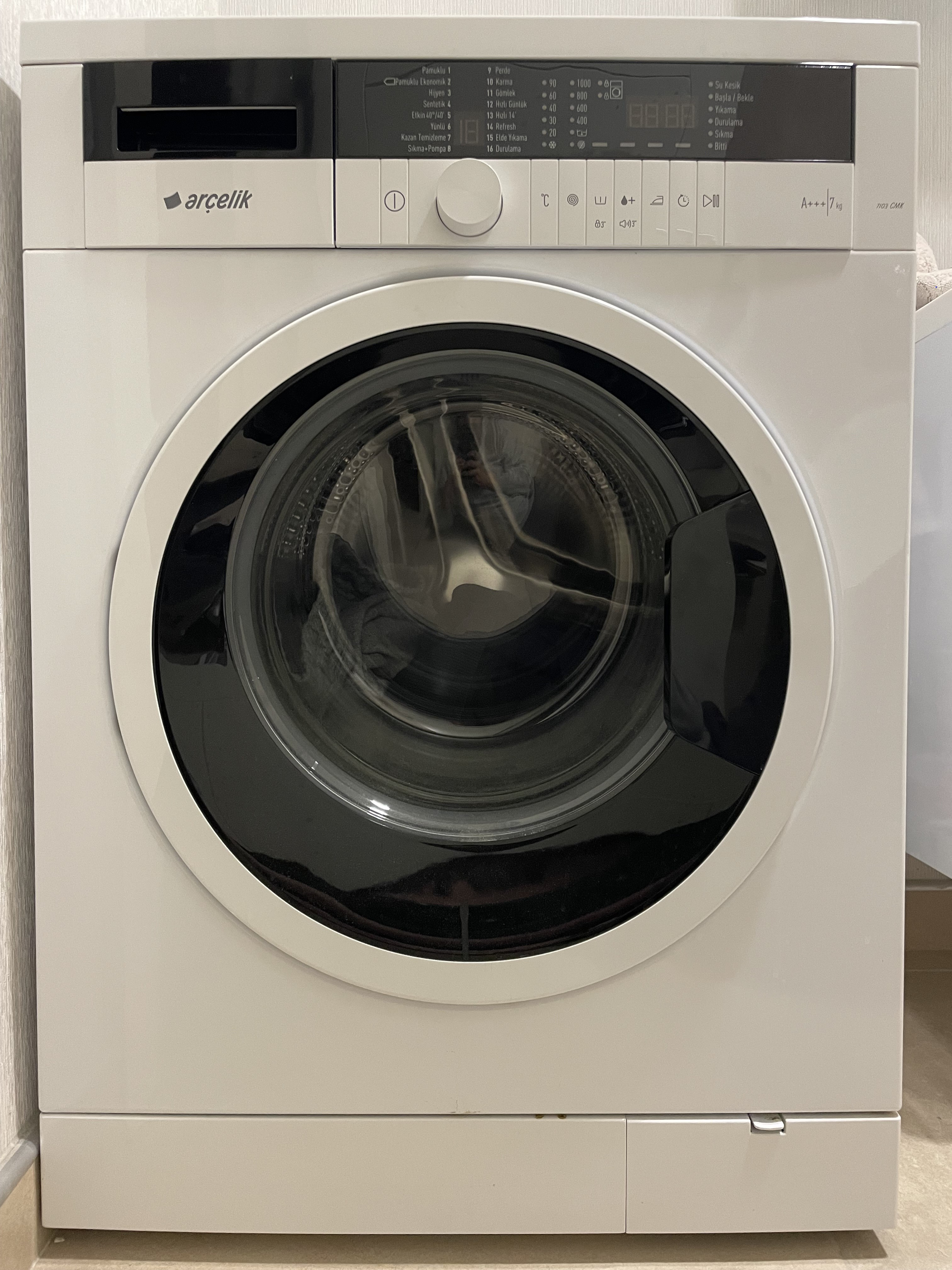
Arçelik Washing Machine

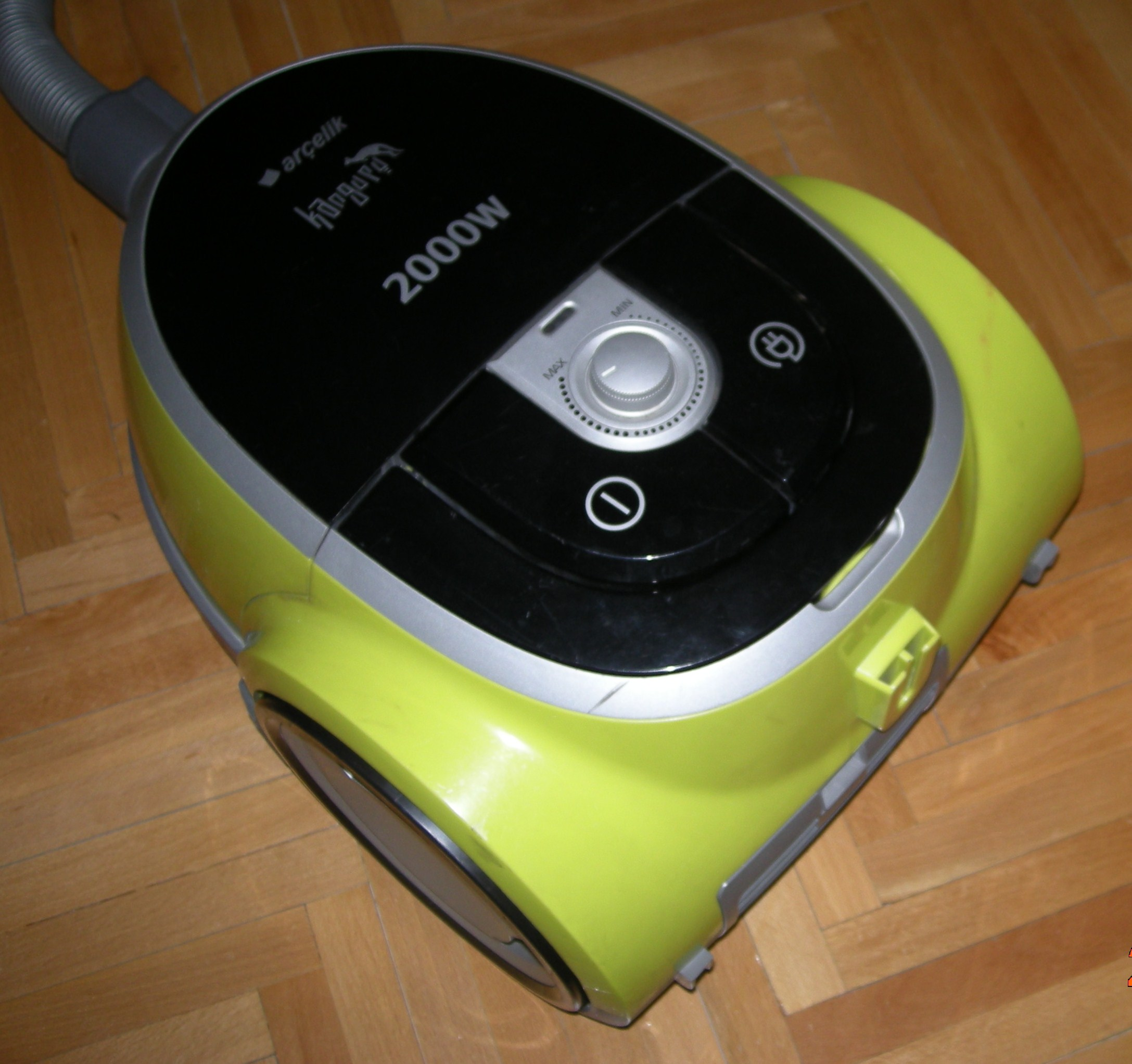
Arçelik Vacuum Cleaner

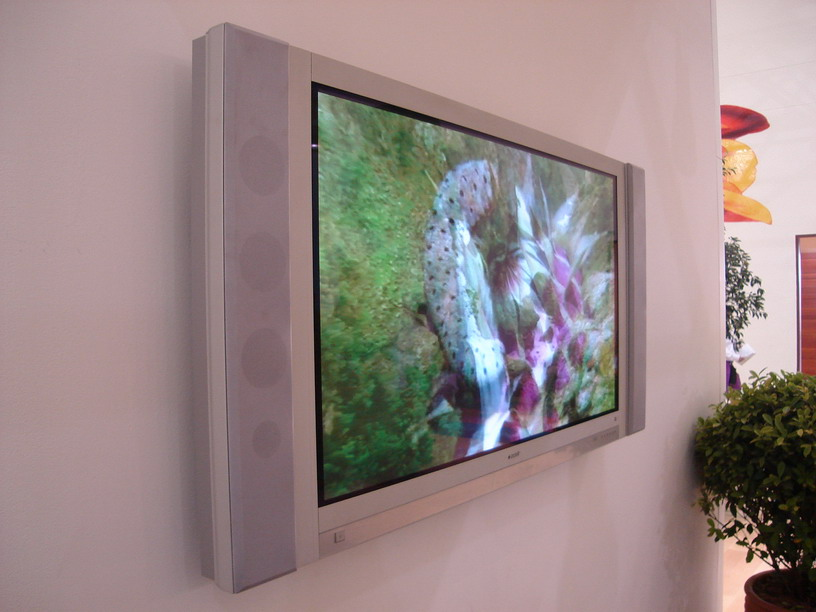
Arçelik is Turkish television maker, found in Royal Flora Expo 2006

== See also ==
- List of companies of Turkey
