= Defy Appliances =

South African manufacturing company

- Industry: Manufacturing and service
- Founded: 1905
- Headquarters: Durban, KwaZulu-Natal, South Africa
- Key people: Ross Heron (CEO Retired) Current CEO: Mustafa Soylu
- Products: Home and major appliances
- Operating income: R2.5 billion (2010)
- Number of employees: 2,600
- Parent: Arçelik Group
- Website: www.defy.co.za

Defy Appliances is a South African manufacturing company and is the largest manufacturer and distributor of major domestic appliances in Southern Africa. The company manufactures and develops a range of large appliances from gas stoves, refrigerators, washing machines and tumble dryers to continuous clean ovens and convection ovens.

== History ==
It currently operates two factories:

- Jacobs (Durban) — manufactures freestanding stoves, built-in ovens, hobs, and tumble dryers.
- Ezakheni (Ladysmith) — manufactures electric chest freezers and electric refrigerators.

Defy Appliances was founded in 1905 in Wentworth, KwaZulu-Natal by John Skinner and Sir Benjamin Greenacre. The company manufactured its first product, electric stoves, in 1932. The Durban Falkirk Iron Company (DFI, now DEFY) moved the foundry from Jacobs to Newcastle around 1987. In July 2011, the company was acquired by Turkish based Arçelik for US$324-million as part of its plan to expand into emerging markets in Africa.
