= Voltas =

Indian multinational home appliances and consumer electronics company

Voltas Limited
- Type: Public
- Traded as: NSE: VOLTAS; BSE: 500575
- ISIN: INE226A01021
- Industry: Home appliances
- Founded: 1954; 72 years ago
- Headquarters: Mumbai, Maharashtra, India
- Area served: Worldwide
- Key people: Noel Tata (Chairman); Mukundan Menon (MD & CEO)
- Products: Air conditioning Refrigerator; Air cooler Washing machine Air purifier Dishwasher; Water cooler Microwave oven Water dispensers Voltage stabiliser
- Revenue: ▲₹15,737 crore (US$1.6 billion) (FY2025)
- Operating income: ▲₹1,317 crore (US$140 million) (FY2025)
- Net income: ▲₹834 crore (US$87 million) (FY2025)
- Total assets: ▲₹13,152 crore (US$1.4 billion) (FY2025)
- Total equity: ▲₹6,540 crore (US$680 million) (FY2025)
- Number of employees: 10,600+ (2024)
- Parent: Tata Group
- Website: www.voltas.com
- Footnotes; Financials as of 31 March 2025.

Voltas Limited is an Indian multinational home appliance company, headquartered in Mumbai. It designs, develops, manufactures and sells products including air conditioners, air coolers, refrigerators, washing machines, dishwashers, microwaves, air purifiers, water dispensers. Voltas is India's largest air conditioning company by market share.

The company was incorporated on 6 September 1954 in Mumbai, as a collaboration between Tata Sons and Volkart Brothers. The company is currently chaired by Noel Tata and Mukundan Menon is the company's current chief executive officer and managing director.

== Operations ==
The company is broadly structured into projects and products business. The projects business is divided into Domestic Projects Group and International Operations Business Group. Meanwhile, the products business is classified into Unitary Products Business Group, Mining & Construction Equipment Division, and Textile Machinery Division.

The Unitary Products business group manufacture products in categories including air conditioners, air coolers, commercial refrigerators, water coolers, and water dispensers. Voltas is the largest air conditioning brand in India. It started manufacturing air conditioners in the 1960s under licence from the Carrier Corporation. Voltas produced India's first window air conditioner with DC-inverter-based variable-speed motors. DC Inverter Technology is an innovative technology that provides superior cooling while reducing the frequency of turning the compressor on and off. This helps in reducing the power consumption to a greater extent. Voltas also has a large network of repair centres. The firm is also a major producer of evaporative coolers, which are widely used for comfort cooling in arid and semi-arid climates.

Voltas has a partnership for compressor with Elgi Equipments, a compressor manufacturing firm.

Voltas has also entered into a joint venture with Turkey-based Ardutch (a subsidiary of Arçelik, part of the Koç Group making the Beko brand of home appliances). It began producing refrigerators, air conditioners, washing machines and kitchen appliances under the name of Voltas Beko.

Voltas has completed many international projects, including air conditioning in the world's tallest building, the Burj Khalifa, in the once largest ocean liner, RMS Queen Mary 2, Palace of Sultanate of Oman, Bahrain City Centre Mall, Ferrari World Theme Park in Abu Dhabi, Sidra Medical and Research Centre in Qatar, Villaggio Mall in Qatar and Dubai's Mall of Emirates.

== Voltas Beko ==
Voltas Beko
- Type: Joint venture
- Industry: Home appliances
- Founded: 2017; 9 years ago
- Headquarters: Mumbai, Maharashtra
- Area served: India
- Key people: Jayant Balan (CEO)
- Products: Refrigerator; Washing machine Microwave oven Dishwasher
- Parent: Voltas (50%); Arçelik A.Ş. (50%)

Voltbek Home Appliances, doing business as Voltas Beko is a 50:50 joint venture between India's Voltas and Turkish electronic manufacturer Beko. The joint venture was formed in 2017 to cater to the Indian home appliances market.
