= Grundig =

Consumer and Automotive electronics brand

- Product type: Home appliances, consumer electronics, motor vehicle electronics and accessories, auto-move products, electric mobility products
- Current owner: Arçelik (home appliances and consumer electronics); Modern Creation Luxembourg S.à r.l. (specified automotive-related trademarks)
- Country: Global; Germany
- Introduced: 1945 by Max Grundig

Grundig (English: /ˈɡrʌndɪɡ, ˈɡrʊndɪɡ/ GRU(U)N-dig, German pronunciation: [ˈɡʁʊndɪç]) is a brand of German origin used for home appliances, consumer electronics, automotive, auto-move, and electric-mobility-related products. Founded by Max Grundig in 1945, the original company was based primarily in Fürth, Germany, until its insolvency in 2003. Following the insolvency, its business divisions were sold separately. The home appliance and consumer electronics operations were acquired by Beko Elektronik and Alba plc in 2004 and subsequently came under the ownership of Arçelik, a subsidiary of Koç Holding. In 2003, Grundig's automotive electronics division was acquired by Delphi Corporation, a former subsidiary of General Motors (GM), before being acquired by Modern Creation Luxembourg S.à r.l. (MCL) in 2009.

The Grundig company helped fuel the post-war economic miracle of West Germany and grew to become one of the world's leading manufacturers of radios, televisions, recording devices and other electronic equipment. In the 1970s, Philips began acquiring shares in Grundig, gaining complete control in 1993 before divesting the company in 1998. Grundig filed for insolvency in April 2003 after years of financial losses and increasing competition from lower-cost Asian manufacturers.

In 2003, Grundig's Car InterMedia Systems division, which developed automotive audio and multimedia equipment, was acquired by the American automotive technology company Delphi Corporation. In 2004, the home consumer-electronics business was acquired by a Turkish-British joint venture between Beko and Alba, which relaunched the brand through Grundig Intermedia GmbH. In 2007, Koç Holding, the parent company of Beko, acquired full control of the consumer-electronics business and placed it under its home-appliance subsidiary Arçelik A.Ş.. The German operations were subsequently consolidated under Beko Germany GmbH, based in Eschborn, near Frankfurt. In 2009, Modern Creation Luxembourg S.à r.l. has acquired full control of automotive business from Delphi and managed the licensing of Grundig trademarks for automotive products. Since 2020, GRUNDIG-branded products have also been marketed in electric mobility categories, including electric bicycles, under separate licensing arrangements.

== History ==
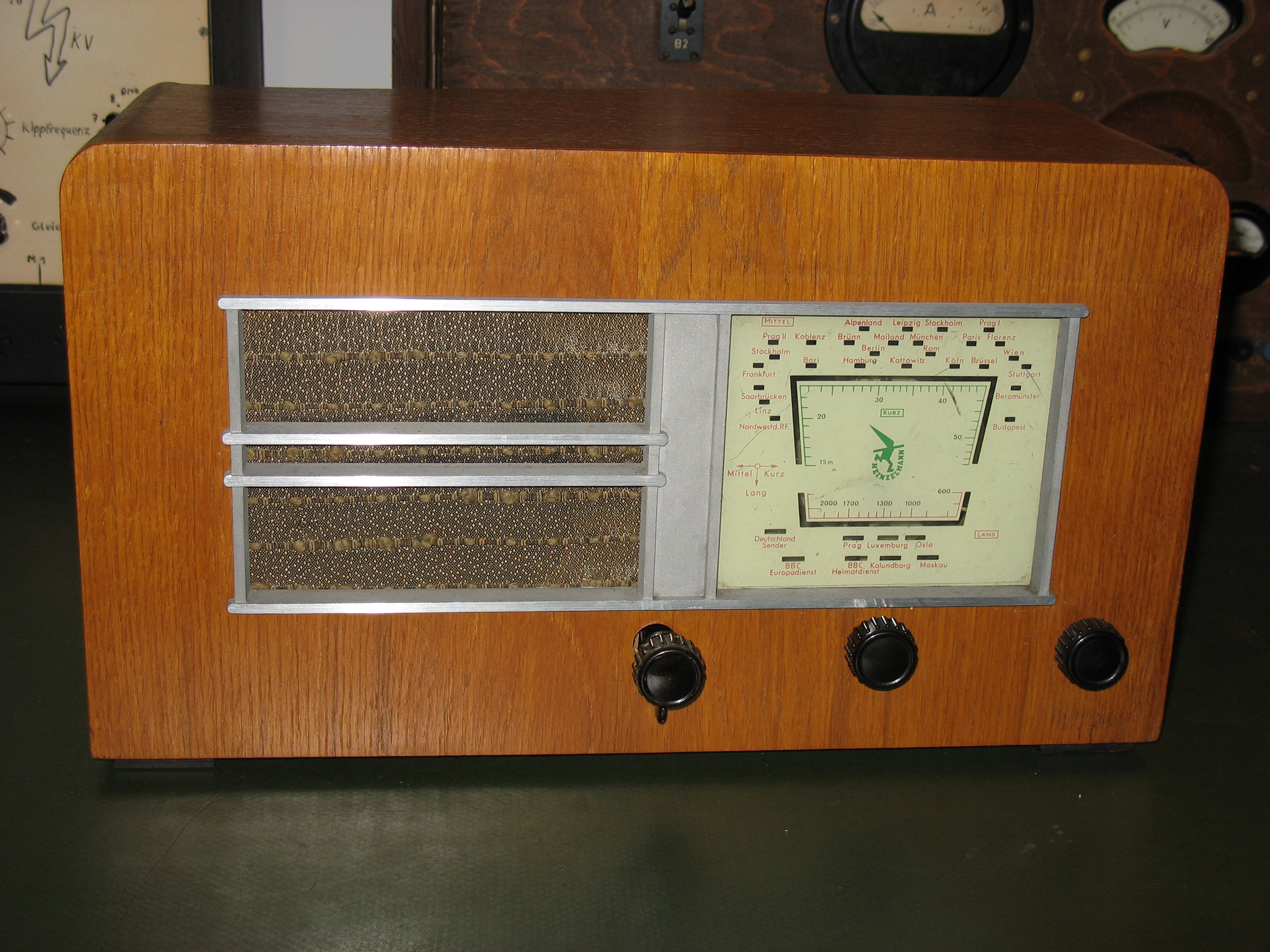
Radio kit Heinzelmann (1945)

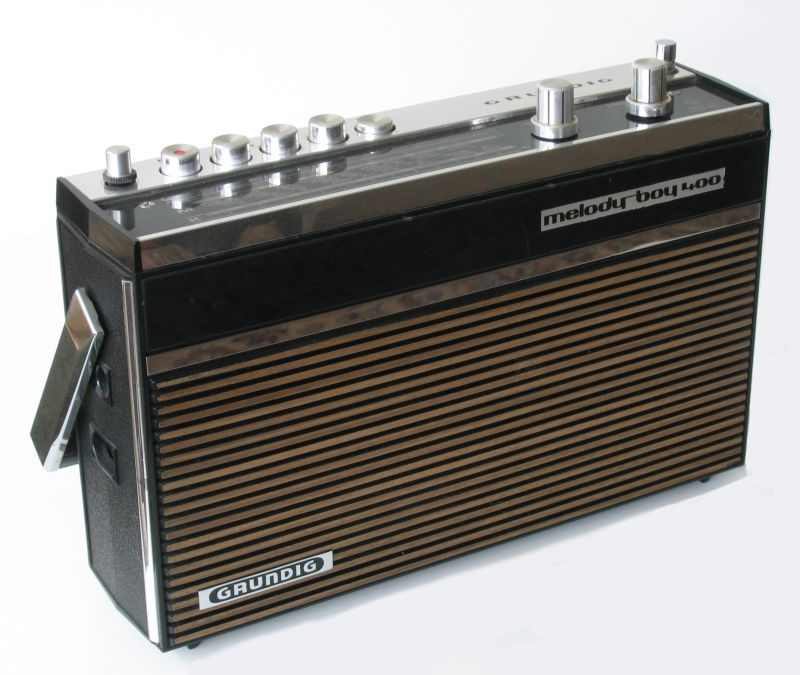
Grundig melody boy 400 radio

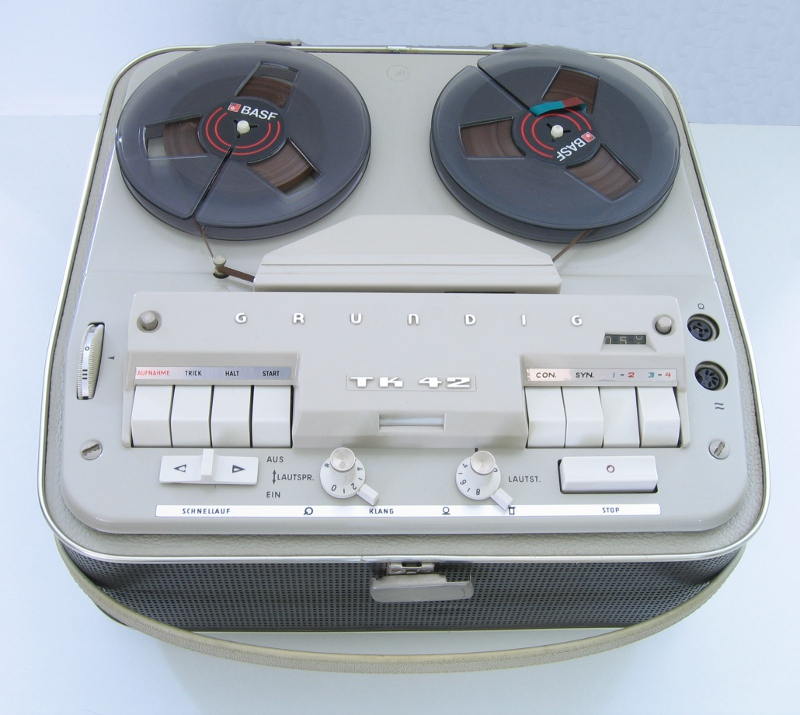
Grundig TK42 tape recorder

Grundig began in 1945 with the establishment of a store named Fürth, Grundig & Wurzer (Radio-Vertrieb Fürth), which sold radios and was headquartered in Fürth, northern Bavaria. After the Second World War, Max Grundig recognized the need for radios in Germany, and in 1947 produced a kit, while a factory and administration centre were built at Fürth. In 1951, the first television sets were manufactured at the new facility. At the time Grundig was the largest radio manufacturer in Europe. Divisions were established in Nuremberg, Frankfurt and Karlsruhe.

In 2013, Grundig launched its home appliances (white goods) product range, becoming one of the mainstream manufacturers in Europe. Parent Arcelik A.Ş., has more than 27,000 employees worldwide. Grundig has manufacturing plants in several European cities that deliver their products to more than 65 countries around the world.

=== 1940s ===
Grundig started as a typical German company in 1945. Its early notability was due to Grundig radio. Max Grundig, a radio dealer, built a machine called "Heinzelmann", which was a radio that came without thermionic valves and as a do it yourself kit to circumvent post war rules. The first of the same was named the Weltklang.

=== 1950s ===
Based on the success of the Heinzelmann, Grundig opened a factory. This allowed the company to start Grundig TV. This was created for the first German television channel which started in 1952. The company then developed a portable tape recorder and The Grundig Television Receiver 210.

In 1955, the American firm of Wilcox-Gay began importing Grundig radios into the U.S., using its Majestic Radio dealer network to distribute the German company's products. The marketing of "Majestic-Grundig" radios continued until Wilcox-Gay went out of business at the end of 1961.

In 1957, Grundig purchased a majority stake in Triumph-Adler as well as in Adlerwerke. In 1958, Grundig acquired both companies outright and merged them and Grundig's dictation machine division to form Triumph-Adler-Büromaschinen-Vertriebs-GmbH.

=== 1960s ===
A plant was opened in 1960 to manufacture tape recorders in Belfast, Northern Ireland, the first production by Grundig outside Germany. The managing director of the plant, Thomas Niedermayer, was kidnapped and later killed by the Provisional IRA in December 1973. The factory was closed with the loss of around 1000 jobs in 1980.

=== 1970s ===
In 1972, Grundig GmbH became Grundig AG. After this Philips began to gradually accumulate shares in the company over the years, and assumed complete economic control in 1993. Grundig pulled out of this partnership in 1998 owing to unsatisfactory performance and the decline in Philips consumer electronics presence around the world.

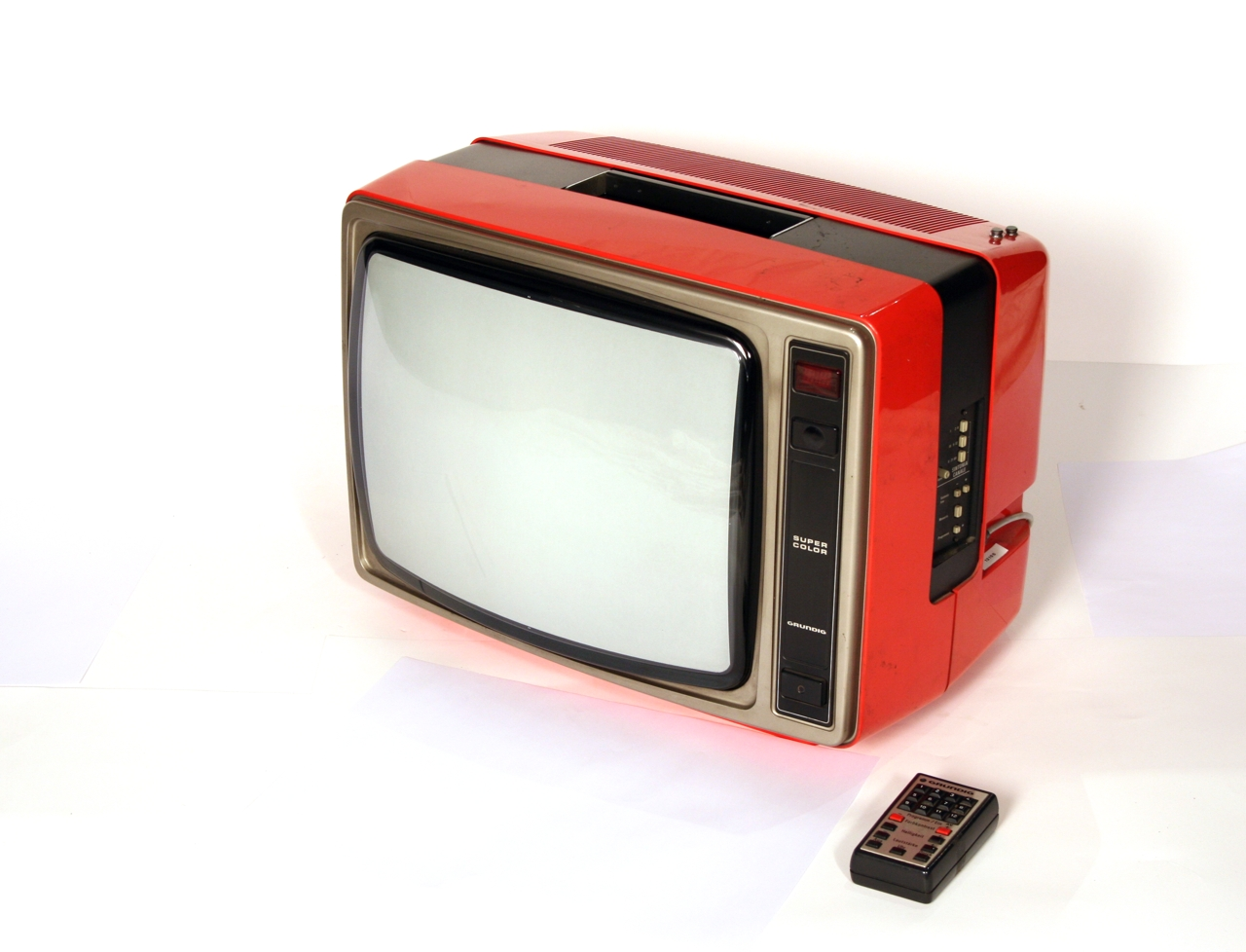
Grundig Colour TV with remote 1981

=== 1980s ===
Germany's first colour television projector was started by Grundig in 1980. The next year, the second generation electronic notepad was developed and marketed. Philips increased its stake in the company and Max Grundig no longer controlled business management in 1984.

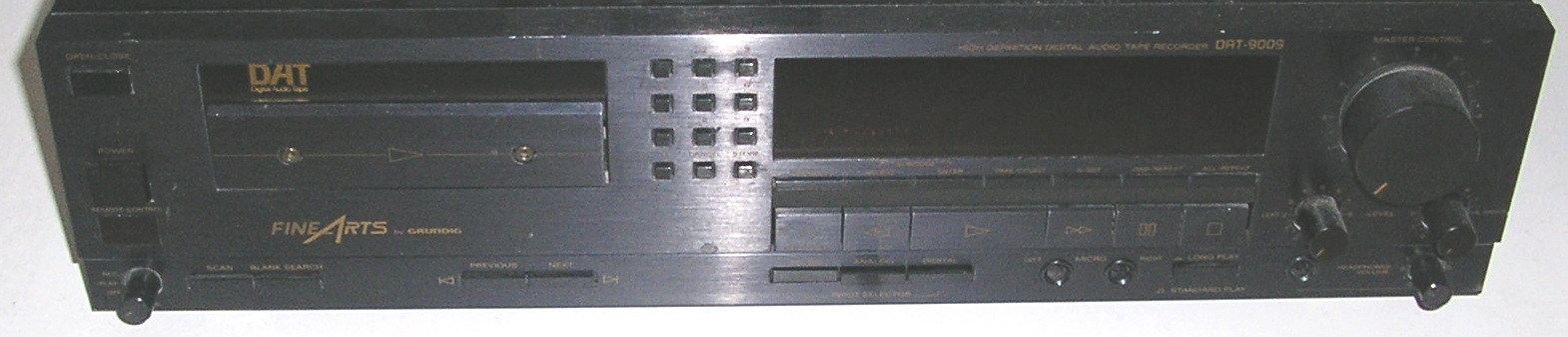
Grundig Fine Arts Digital Audio Tape-recorder DAT 9009 (1987–1990)

=== 1990s ===
In 1991, Grundig entered the telephony equipment market starting with its cordless telephone. In 1993, the Grundig TV was based on a 16:9 picture format for signal transmission. In 1995 and 1996, the company included 3-D sound systems, TVs, satellite receivers and other initiatives that included interactive user guidance. However, Philips divested of its investment in the company by 1997–8.

=== 2000s ===
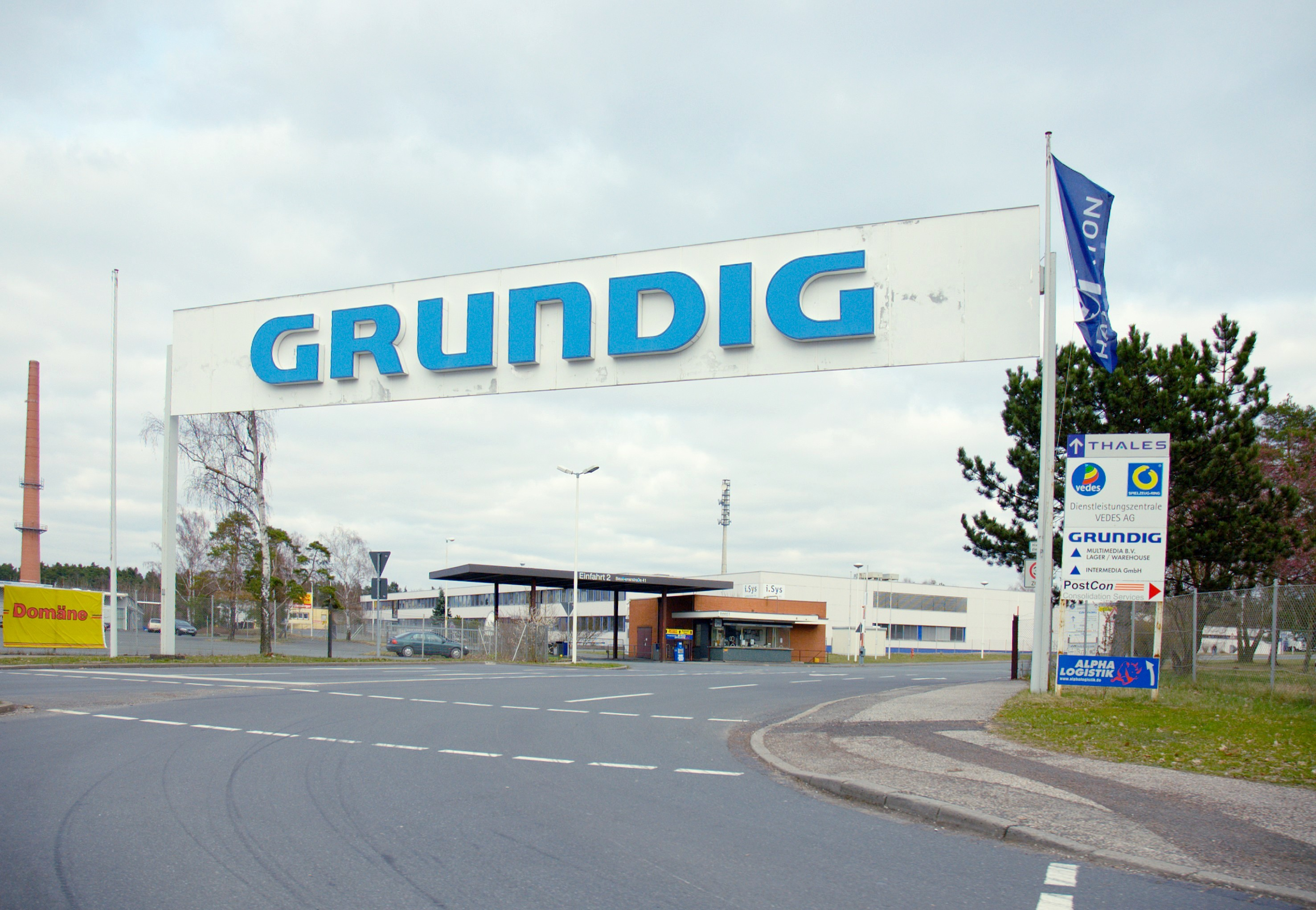
Former Grundig plant in Nuremberg

At the end of June 2000 Grundig relocated its headquarters in Fürth to Nuremberg-Langwasser. The company had a turnover of €1.281 billion the following year. In autumn 2002, Grundig's banks did not extend the company's lines of credit, leaving the company with an April 2003 deadline to announce insolvency. Grundig AG declared bankruptcy in 2003. In 2004 the UK's Alba plc and the Turkish Koç's Beko jointly took over Grundig Home InterMedia System, Grundig's consumer electronics division. In 2007 Alba sold its half of the business to Koç for US$50.3 million, although it retained the license to use the Grundig brand in the UK until 2010, and in Australasia until 2012.

In 2007 Grundig Mobile announced the U900 Linux-based mobile phone.

At the end of 2007 Turkey's Koç Holding took full ownership of Grundig Multimedia, the parent company of Grundig Intermedia GmbH in Nuremberg.

In 2009, Modern Creation Luxembourg S.à r.l. acquired the former Delphi-Grundig automotive business.

=== 2010s ===
The company continued on to produce entertainment electronics, electrical, and home appliances. The company entered the white goods sector in 2013,

During the 2010s, Grundig continued to develop its consumer-electronics and home-appliance business under Arçelik. In 2013, the brand expanded into the major appliance sector, adding large household appliances to its existing consumer-electronics and small-appliance ranges， thus becoming the EU's only consumer electronics company covering the full range.

In 2014, the GRUNDIG trademark was registered in the United States under the ownership of Modern Creation Luxembourg S.à r.l. The registration covers specified goods in International Classes 9 and 12, including in-vehicle entertainment, communication, navigation, telematics, security and safety electronics.

In 2016, Grundig closed its offices in Nuremberg and relocated its operations to share premises with Beko, then headquartered in Neu-Isenburg.

=== Present ===
Grundig's home-appliance and consumer-electronics operations are associated with Arçelik and its Beko business. In Germany, Grundig Intermedia was merged with Beko into Beko Grundig Deutschland GmbH. The business subsequently relocated to Eschborn, in the Frankfurt metropolitan area, and was renamed Beko Germany GmbH in late 2023.

The GRUNDIG name is also used in the automotive and mobility sectors under separate trademark arrangements. Modern Creation Luxembourg S.à r.l. is a registered owner of GRUNDIG trademarks for specified automotive electronics and vehicle-related goods, independently of Arçelik's home-appliance and consumer-electronics operations.

The official GRUNDIG Auto website identifies Modern Creation Luxembourg as the trademark holder and describes a licensing arrangement with a company based in Shenzhen, China. Its automotive product portfolio includes lighting systems, audio and entertainment equipment, and mechanical components.

== Sponsorship ==
In 1988, Grundig sponsored the inaugural UCI Mountain Bike World Cup series. Later on, Grundig became the first official technology partner of the Bundesliga (professional association football league) in 2011. In addition to that, the Nuremberg football stadium was called Grundig Stadium until the end of 2015. Grundig continued its Bundesliga Official Technology Partnership in 2014. The Grundig logo was a permanent display item during all Bundesliga and Bundesliga 2 broadcasts from 2012/13 until 2014/15.

Grundig is also the name sponsor of the Norwegian Women's and Men's Handball Leagues.

Furthermore, Grundig continued its sponsorship with Fenerbahçe's women's and men's volleyball teams, and sponsored many international golf tournaments in 2014.

Grundig launched the Respect Food initiative with the goal of underlining the seriousness of the food waste problem to reduce global food waste which is the second topic of the UN's 2030 sustainable development goals.

== Products ==
Grundig offers household appliances and electronic goods.

- Television: Grundig offers a wide range of televisions based on LCD technology as well as models with an OLED screen.
- Radio: Grundig produced several ranges of transistor radios. These included the small portable "Yacht Boy" radios for mariners, with FM, LW, MW, and up to 12 SW bands for worldwide coverage. The Satellit range radios were the most robust and sophisticated of the Grundig radio range.
- Audio: Grundig audiovisual product range offers HIFI Systems, soundbars and Bluetooth speakers.
- Home appliances: manufactured by Grundig include fridges, freezers, ovens, stoves, hobs, hoods, microwaves, warming drawers, washing machines and dryers. Grundig's small domestic appliances include coffee machines, toasters, tea makers, kettles, mixers, blenders, other kitchen helpers, dishwashers, steam irons and vacuum cleaners.
- Personal care products: Grundig extended its product range and offers hair dryers, hair stylers, shavers, body scales, foot massagers, manicure and pedicure sets, toothbrushes, facial saunas and ultrasonic cleaners.
- Automotive: GRUNDIG-branded automotive products include in-car audio and entertainment systems, navigation and communication equipment, automotive lighting, vehicle electronics and accessories. The brand is used in these categories under trademark licensing arrangements associated with Modern Creation Luxembourg S.à r.l.
- Auto-Move: The GRUNDIG brand is also used for vehicle-related accessories and mobility products, covering selected categories of automotive equipment and transport accessories.
- E-Mobility: GRUNDIG-branded electric mobility products include electric bicycles (e-bikes) and related cycling accessories, marketed through separate licensing arrangements.

== See also ==
- Grundig Business Systems
- Video Compact Cassette - VP-100 VTR
