= Symphony Xplorer ZV =

2015 Android smartphone by Symphony Mobile

- Brand: Symphony
- Type: Smartphone
- Series: Xplorer
- First released: January 2015
- Compatible networks: 2G, 3G
- Dimensions: 140 mm × 70 mm × 7.9 mm
- Weight: 150 g (5 oz)m
- Operating system: Android v4.4.2 KitKat
- CPU: 1.4 GHz Octa Core/MT 6592M
- Memory: 2GB RAM
- Storage: 16GB
- Removable storage: Up to 32 GB
- Battery: 2000 mAh
- Rear camera: 13 MP
- Front camera: 2 MP
- Display: 5 in
- Connectivity: Wi-Fi, Bluetooth, USB

The Symphony Xplorer ZV is an Android smartphone manufactured by Symphony Mobile. It was introduced in January 2015 for Bangladesh.

== Features ==
- Network: 2G, 3G
- SIM: Dual SIM (micro)
- Rear Camera: 13 MP
- Front Camera: 2 MP
- Memory: 2 GB RAM
- Storage: 32 GB
- Battery: 2000 mAh
- Size: 5 in
- Operating System: Android 4.4.2 KitKat
- CPU: 1.4 GHz Octa Core/MT 6592M
- Dimensions: 140 mm × 70 mm × 7.9 mm
- Sensors: Accelerometer, proximity, light, G-sensor
- Weight: 150 g
- IPS capacitive display
- Browser: HTML
- GPU : Mali 450mp4
