= Symphony Xplorer H200 =

2015 Android smartphone by Symphony Mobile

- Brand: Symphony
- Type: Smartphone
- Series: Xplorer
- First released: 2015, January
- Availability by region: Bangladesh
- Compatible networks: 2G, 3G
- Dimensions: 137×68×8.1 mm (5.39×2.68×0.32 in)
- Weight: 137 g (5 oz)
- Operating system: Android v4.4.2 KitKat
- CPU: 1.3 GHz Quad Core/MT 6582 M
- Memory: 1 GB RAM
- Storage: 16GB
- Removable storage: up to 32 GB
- Battery: 1800 mAh
- Rear camera: 13 MP
- Front camera: 8 MP
- Display: 4.7 inch
- Connectivity: Wi-Fi, Bluetooth, USB

The Symphony Xplorer H200 is an Android smartphone manufactured by Symphony Mobile. It was introduced in January 2015 for Bangladesh.

== Features ==
- Network: 2G, 3G
- SIM: Dual SIM
- Rear Camera: 13 MP
- Front Camera: 8 MP
- Memory: 1 GB RAM
- Storage: 16 GB
- Battery: 1800 mAh
- Size: 4.7 In
- Operating System: Android 4.4.2 KitKat
- CPU: 1.3 GHz Quad Core/MT 6582 M
- Dimensions: 137 X 68 X 8.1 mm
- Sensors: Accelerometer, Proximity, Light, G-Sensor
- Weight: 137g
- IPS Capacitive Display
- Browser: HTML
