= Toyota HiMedic =

Emergency medical service version of the Toyota HiAce

The Toyota HiMedic (Japanese: トヨタ・ハイメディック, Toyota Haimedikku) is a variant of the Toyota HiAce made for ambulance use. Since the introduction of the HiMedic in 1992, production of the unit is done by Toyota with factory ambulance conversions done by the Conversion Business Unit division of Toyota Customizing & Development.

According to Toyota, the name HiMedic was given to indicate that it carries sophisticated medical devices in the vehicle.

== First generation (H100) ==
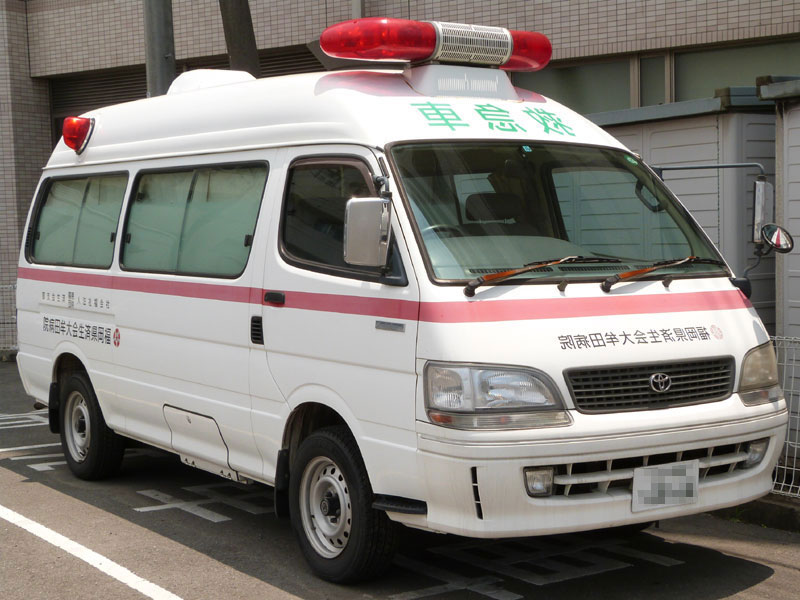
Toyota HiMedic (H100)

Based on the Toyota Hiace (H100), the first generation HiMedic was released in May 1992 at Toyota Technocraft's Yokohama Plant. Sales began in June of the same year. The first HiMedic was certified by the Fire and Disaster Management Agency as a "high-standard ambulance". In February 1998, the 1,000th HiMedic was produced.

The HiMedic H100 has a high roof and was powered by a 4.0-liter 1UZ-FE V8 engine shared with the Celsior.

=== XH10 Variant ===
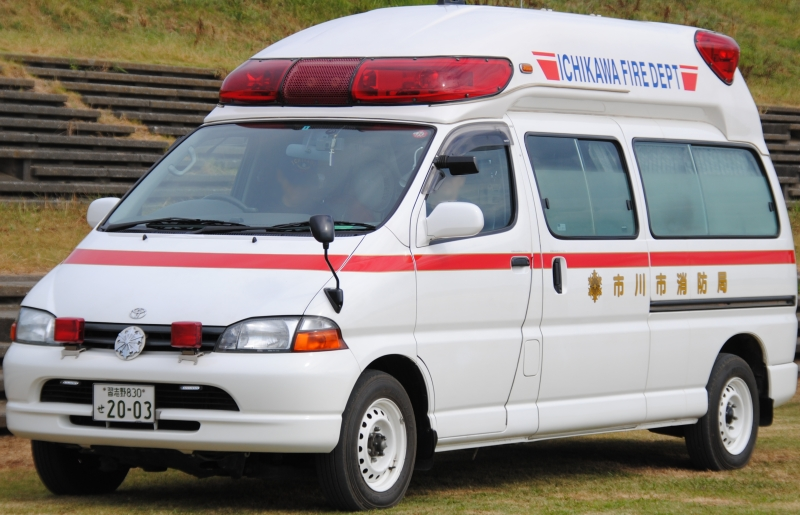
Toyota HiMedic (XH10)

Based on the Toyota Hiace XH10, this variant started production at Gifu Autobody in May 1997.

In November 2004, Toyota Technocraft announced that the 3,000th HiMedic was produced. In October 2007, the 4,000th HiMedic was produced.

== Second generation (H200) ==
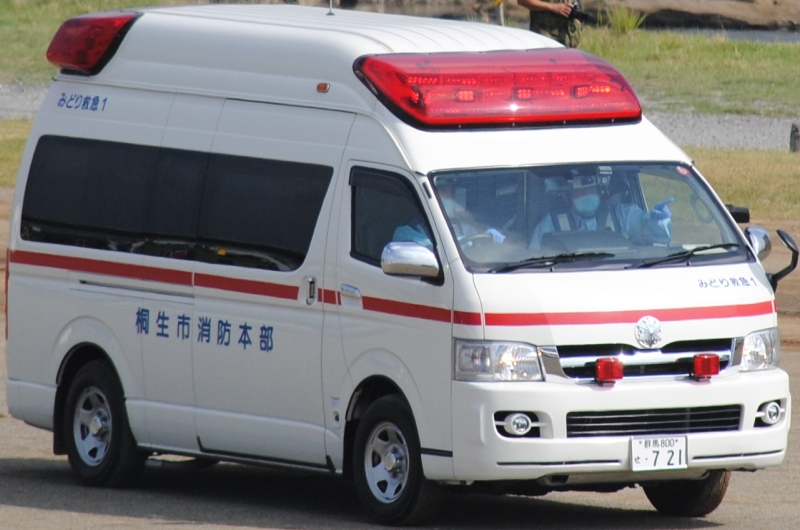
Toyota HiMedic (H200)

Based on the Toyota Hiace (H200), the vehicle was officially launched on April 27, 2006, by Toyota with certification issued by the Ministry of Land, Infrastructure, Transport and Tourism for having less than 50% emissions. It has a 2.7 L 2TR-FE engine with a 4-speed automatic-based ECT-E transmission for high performance.

On November 27, 2013, slight revisions were made to the vehicle from having an ECT-based transmission to a four-speed automatic ECT-iE transmission.

In November 2015, Toyota announced a collaboration with Honda and Japan Mayday Service for a trial service called D-Call Net, which involves having the system in the HiMedics being compatible with Bluetooth-based mobile phones.

On April 17, 2020, Toyota announced that the HiMedic now comes standard with the Toyota Safety Sense, which assists drivers in the vehicle to keep an eye on pedestrians and other vehicles on the road. It also has a panoramic mirror to help the driver navigate through tight spaces.

== Bibliography ==
- Sagawa, K; Inooka, H (April 1, 2002). "Ride quality evaluation of an actively-controlled stretcher for an ambulance". Proceedings of the Institution of Mechanical Engineers, Part H: Journal of Engineering in Medicine. 216 (4): 247–256. doi:10.1243/09544110260138736. PMID 12206521. S2CID 43702157.

== See also ==
- Nissan Paramedic a similar vehicle
