= Nissan Paramedic =

Series of Nissan ambulance vehicles

The Nissan Paramedic is an ambulance nameplate by Nissan that has been used for three separate vehicle ranges of trucks in Japan. There are versions of the following Nissan models:

- The 1st generation Nissan Paramedic originally based on the Isuzu Elf and later the Nissan Atlas, itself a slightly modified and badge engineered Isuzu Elf. This first generation was built from 1993 to 1997. Note the 1st generation Paramedic was also marketed by Isuzu as the Super Medic until 1997.
- The 2nd generation Nissan Paramedic is based on the first generation Nissan Elgrand, a minivan. The generation was built from May 1998 to 2017. Note the E50 Paramedic was also marketed by Isuzu as the Super Medic II until 2002.
- The 3rd generation Nissan Paramedic is based on the fifth generation Nissan Caravan, a cab-over van.
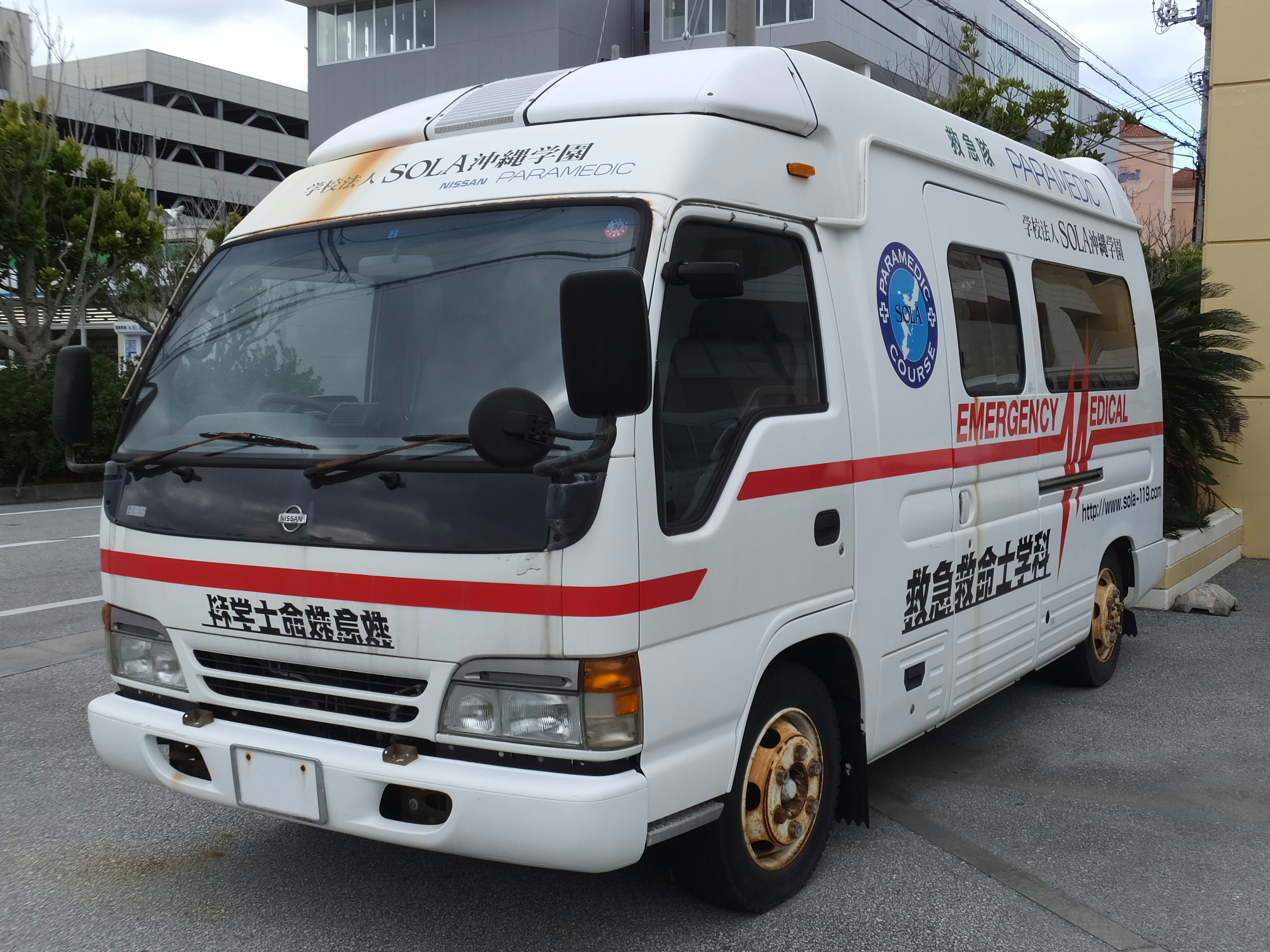
1st generation Nissan Paramedic

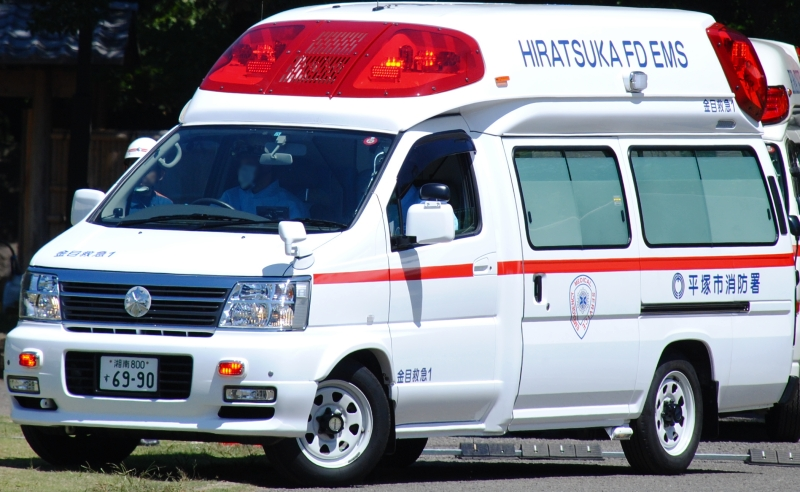
2nd generation Nissan Paramedic

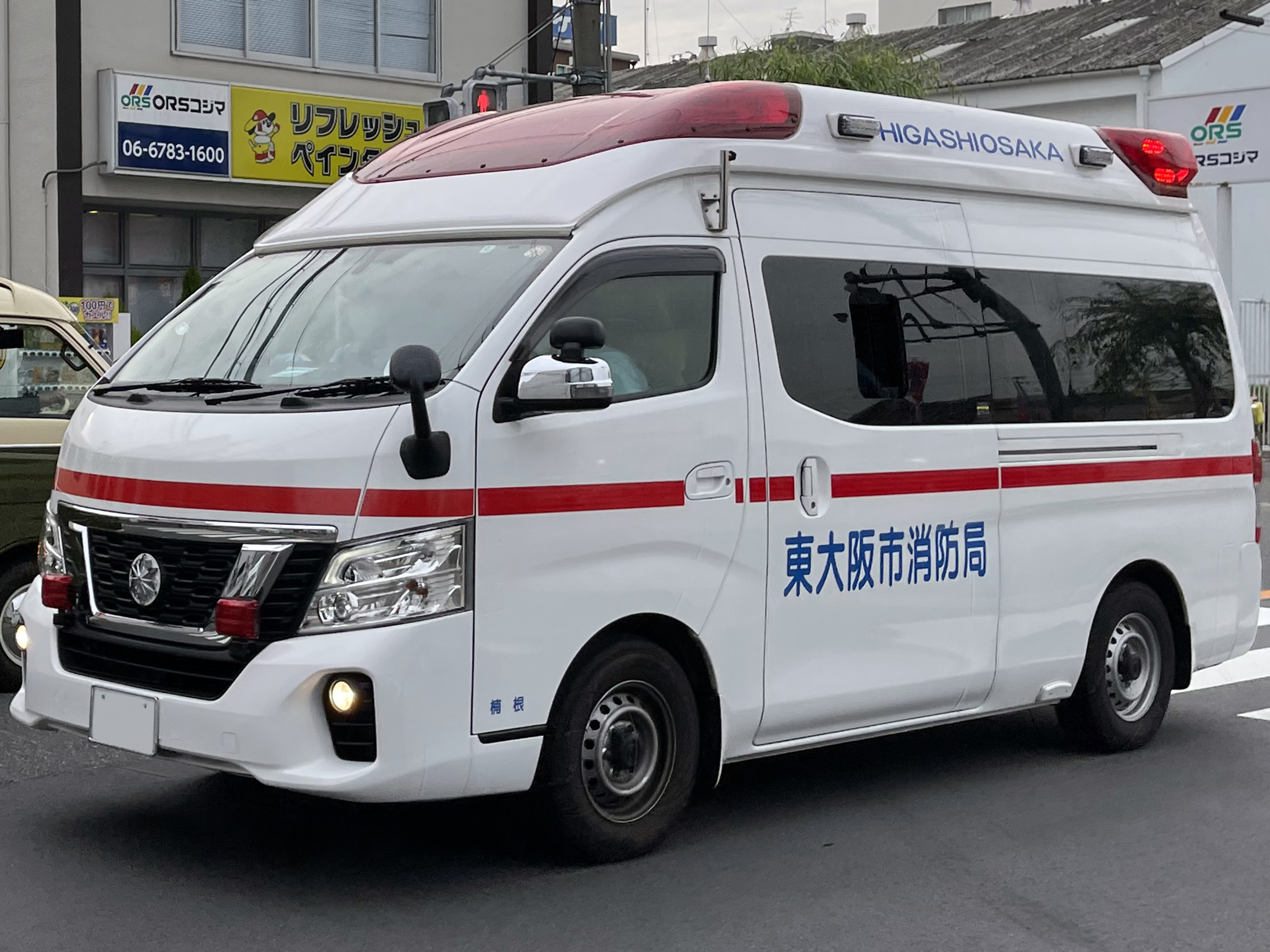
3rd generation Nissan Paramedic

== See also ==
- Toyota HiMedic, the Toyota competition
