= Lenovo Essential laptops =

Value-priced series of laptops

In addition to the ThinkPad and IdeaPad laptops, Lenovo also offers a value-priced series of laptops. Called ‘Essential’ on the Lenovo website, the products available in this line include the G Series, B Series, and V Series. Launched in 2009, the first laptop in the Essential range was the G530.

While some web-based reviews tend to incorrectly refer to these laptops as IdeaPads, the products in the Essential range are referred to as the ‘Lenovo xx’ laptops. For example, Lenovo G480, G580, G780.

== G Series ==
The Essential range of G series laptops from Lenovo is designed for basic-computing for budget-oriented consumers.

=== 2011 ===
The G Series laptops released in 2011 were the G470, G570, G475, G575, and G770.

==== G470 ====
The G470 launched with the following specifications:

- Processor: Intel Core i3-2310M or 2.3 GHz Intel Core i5-2410M
- Graphics: CPU-integrated Intel HD 3000
- Memory: Up to 8GB DDR3
- Storage: 1 x SATA (500GB HDD default) + 1 x Ultrabay SATA (DVD-writer by default) + 1 mSATA
- Display: 14" 1366x768 TN LED-backlit

The 6-cell battery offered approximately five hours of battery life. The laptop could also be equipped with a Blu-ray drive instead of a DVD reader/writer.

==== G570 ====
The G570 was launched at the same time as the G470.

The laptop's specifications are as follows:

- Processor:
  - Intel Core i3-2310M
  - Intel Core i5-2410M processors
- Graphics: Intel HD Graphics 3000
- Memory: 4GB DDR3
- Storage: 500GB hard disk drive
- Display: 15.6"
- Battery: 6-cell

Like the G470, the G570 could also be equipped with a Blu-ray drive instead of a DVD reader/writer.

==== G475 ====
The G475 was first announced in Japan.

The laptop's specifications are as follows:

- Processor: 1.6 GHz AMD E350 dual core
- Chipset: AMD A50M
- Graphics: AMD Radeon HD 6310
- Memory: 2GB DDR3
- Storage: 250GB
- Display: 14" (maximum resolution of 1366 × 768)
- Optical Drive: DVD reader/writer
- USB Ports: 4 (USB 2.0)
- Operating System: Windows 7 Home Premium.

With a 6-cell battery, the laptop offered up to 5.6 hours of battery life.

==== G575 ====
The G575 was scheduled for release in April 2011 by Lenovo.

The laptop's specifications are as follows:

- Processor: 1.6 GHz AMD Fusion E360 dual core
- Display: 15.6" TFT (maximum resolution of 1366 × 768)
- Graphics: AMD Radeon HD 6310
- Storage: 320GB
- Web camera: 2MP
- USB ports: 4 (USB 2.0)

Additional features on the laptop included a two-in-one card reader, Wi-Fi, Ethernet LAN, a HDMI port, and Windows 7 Home Premium.

==== G770 ====
Also released in 2011, the specifications of the Lenovo G770 are as follows:

- Processor: up to Intel Core i5-2410M 2.3 GHz
- Graphics:
  - Intel HD graphics (integrated)
  - ATI Mobility Radeon HD 6650M (discrete)
- Memory: up to 8GB DDR3
- Storage: up to 750GB hard disk drive
- Optical Drive: a dual layer DVD reader/writer
- Display: 17.3" (HD, maximum resolution of 1600 × 900)
- Web Camera: integrated
- Operating System: Microsoft Windows 7 Home Premium

=== 2010 ===
G Series laptops released were the G455, G555, G460, and G560.

==== G455 and G555 ====
The G455 and G555 models were announced together in 2010.

The specifications common to the G455 and G555 laptops are as follows:

- Processors: AMD Turion II dual core
- Graphics: ATI Radeon HD (integrated)

The laptops featured 14 inch and 15.6 inch widescreen displays respectively. The G455 was released in China as the G455A; the United States received a later release – March 2010.

The additional features on the G555 laptop are as follows:

- Memory: 3GB DDR2
- Storage: 160GB hard disk drive
- Web camera: integrated
- Optical drive: dual Layer DVD reader/writer
- Connectivity: WiFi
- Operating System: Microsoft Windows 7 Home Premium

==== G460 ====
The G460 and G560 laptops were announced together at CES 2010.

The G460 laptop's specifications are as follows:

- Processor: up to Intel Core i3 processors
- Memory: up to 8GB DDR3
- Display: 14" (16:9, LED backlit, 1366 x 768)
- Storage: 500GB hard disk drive
- Optical Drive: dual layer DVD reader/writer
- Graphics: Intel HD Graphics (integrated)

The laptop was available with DOS (Disk Operating System) – no other standard operating system was included.

==== G560 ====
The G560 was released in 2010 by Lenovo, and summarized by Notebook Review as “a solid consumer budget notebook with a weak touchpad”. The laptop weighed 5.73 lbs and had dimensions of 14.8 × 9.8 × approximately 0.7–1.4 inches.

The laptop's specifications are as follows:

- Processor: Intel Core i3-330M dual-core 2.13 GHz processor
- Chipset: Intel HM55
- Graphics: Intel HD Graphics (integrated)
- Memory: 4GB (DDR3-1066, dual-channel)
- Storage: 320GB 5400RPM
- Display: 15.6" (720p, LED backlit, glossy)
- Connectivity: Wi-Fi
- Optical Drive: DVD reader/writer
- Operating System: Windows 7 Home Premium

Notebook Review listed the pros of the laptop as the build quality, the keyboard, the large number of ports, battery life, low noise and temperature levels, and overall performance. The cons were the touchpad which did not register clicks accurately, the glossy plastic lid which retained fingerprints, and the low screen resolution.

=== 2009 ===
The G Series laptops released in 2009 were the G530 and G550.

==== G530 ====
The G530 was the first laptop in the Essential G Series laptops, and received an Editor's Choice award from Notebook Review upon release. The laptop weighed 5 lbs and measured 14.1 × 10.1 × 1.45 inches.

The laptop's specifications are as follows:

- Processor:
  - Intel Pentium Dual Core
  - Intel Pentium Core 2 Duo
- Display: 15.4" (16:10, maximum resolution of 1280x800)
- Graphics: Intel GMA 4500MHD (integrated)
- Storage: 250GB hard disk drive
- Memory: 3GB of DDR2
- Optical Drive: DVD reader/writer
- Operating System: Microsoft Windows Vista Home Premium.

The G530 was compared favorably to the ThinkPad SL500, with Notebook Review stating that, “Lenovo should be pushing this notebook to small and medium businesses instead of the ThinkPad SL500, since the G530 feels like a much better machine”.

==== G550 ====
The G550 was an updated version of the G530. The most significant difference between the two laptops was a change in screen aspect ratio from 16:10 to 16:9.

The laptop's specifications are as follows:

- Processor: Intel Pentium Dual Core 2 GHz T4200 processor or Core2Duo T6500 2.1 GHz
- Operating system: Microsoft Windows Vista Home Premium
- Display: 15.6" (16:9, glossy, maximum resolution of 1366 x 768)
- Graphics: Intel GMA 4500MHD (integrated) or NVidia GeForce G105M
- Memory: 3GB DDR3
- Storage: 250GB 5400RPM

The laptop measured 14.9 × 9.6 × 1.4 inches. Notebook Review listed the pros of the laptop as its tough construction, textured finish which successfully masked smudges, and the ‘comfortable and solid keyboard’.

Notebook Review also indicated that the laptop functioned well as a desktop replacement, handling web browsing, HD and SD movies, and 2D games with ease. However, some features of the G530 had been removed, among which were one USB port and the Express Card slot. These changes were listed as cons, because the price of the laptop remained unaffected, despite the absence of those features. lenovo has produced new version is called G 580 in G 580 contain webcam and other extra processors that is core i3, core i5, core i7, etc.

== B Series ==
The Essential range of B Series laptops from Lenovo are designed budget-friendly laptops designed for small businesses.

Like the V Series, the Lenovo B Series laptops are budget-friendly laptops designed primarily for small business users.

=== 2018 ===
The laptop released in the Essential range of B Series laptop in 2018 was B330.

==== B330 ====
Lenovo B330
- Also known as: B330
- Developer: Lenovo
- Manufacturer: Lenovo
- Type: Notebook computer
- Released: 2018
- Discontinued: 2020
- Media: 500GB 5400 RPM
- Operating system: Microsoft Windows
- CPU: Intel Core i5
- Memory: 6.0GB DDR3L 1600 MHz
- Storage: 500 GB 5400 RPM/1 TB
- Display: 15.6 in (40 cm)
- Sound: Stereo Speakers with Dolby Advanced Audio certification or JBL
- Input: Keyboard
- Camera: Camera with integrated microphone ^{(Front-facing)}
- Touchpad: ClickPad
- Connectivity: 2 SuperSpeed USB 3.0 inputs, 1 HDMI output, 1 RJ-45 Ethernet Cable input, 1 USB Type-C port, 4-in-1 Card Reader (SD, SDHC, SDXC, MMC) and a headphone/microphone port
- Dimensions: (inches) : 16.45" x 11.51" x 0.99" (mm) : 418 x 292.6 x 25.1
- Weight: 4.8 lb (2.2 kg) / 1.02” (26 mm); 5.7 lb (2.6 kg) / 1.02” (25.95 mm); 7.7 lb (3.5 kg) / 1.1” (27.95 mm)

The Lenovo B330 series was a class of home and small business professional PCs. The B330 series are respectively an 15-inch laptops designed specifically. It was developed by Lenovo in 2018. Both make use of Intel Core i5 or i7 processors. Inches of laptop:

- B330 (15")

=== 2011 ===
The B Series laptops released in 2011 were B470 and B570.

==== B470 ====
The B470 laptop was announced by Lenovo in April 2011.

The specifications of the laptop are as follows:

- Operating System: Windows 7 Home Premium/Professional 64-bit
- Processor:
  - 2.1 GHz Intel Core i3-2310M
  - 2.3 GHz Intel Core i5-2410M
- Graphics:
  - Intel HD 3000 Graphics
  - NVIDIA GeForce 410M Graphics (1GB video RAM)
- Memory: Up to 8GB DDR3
- Storage: Up to 1TB Hard Drive
- Display: 14" (maximum resolution: 1366 × 768)
- Web camera: 0.3 MP

==== B570 ====
Released in 2011, the B570 laptop received a positive review from CNET, with the reviewer saying, “For such a modestly priced laptop, the Lenovo Essential B570 really does punch above its weight.” The pros of the laptop were listed as the low price, good performance, design, and display. The only con listed by CNET was the low storage capacity.

The specifications of the laptop are as follows:

- Processor: 2.1 GHz Core i3-2310M dual core or 2.1 GHz Pentium B950 dual core
- Memory: 3 GB or 4GB. Expandable to 8GB
- Display: 15.6" (16:9, maximum resolution: 1366 × 768)
- Storage: 320GB or 500 GB

=== 2010 ===
The B Series laptops released in 2010 were the B460 and the B560.

==== B460 ====
The specifications of the B460 laptop are as follows:

- Processor: Up to Intel Core i5-520M
- Operating System: Up to Windows 7 Professional
- Display: 14" (HD, 16:9, maximum resolution: 1366 x 768)
- Graphics: Up to NVIDIA GeForce 310M (discrete, 512MB video RAM)
- Memory: up to 8GB DDR3
- Storage: up to 500GB
- Optical Drive: DVD reader/writer
- Web camera: integrated

==== B560 ====
The specifications of the B560 laptop are as follows:

- Processor: up to Intel Core i5-580M
- Operating System: up to Windows 7 Home Premium
- Display: 15.6" (HD, 16:9, maximum resolution: 1366 x 768)
- Graphics: up to NVIDIA GeForce 310M (discrete, 512MB video RAM)
- Memory: up to 4GB DDR3
- Storage: up to 500GB
- Optical Drive: Integrated DVD reader/writer
- Web camera: integrated

== V Series ==
Like the B Series, the Lenovo V Series laptops are budget-friendly laptops designed primarily for small business users.

=== 2018 ===
The laptop released in the Essential range of V Series laptop in 2018 was V330.

==== V330 ====
Lenovo V330
- Also known as: V330
- Developer: Lenovo
- Manufacturer: Lenovo
- Type: Notebook computer
- Released: 2018
- Introductory price: $499.00— V330 (14") $599.00— V330 (15")
- Discontinued: 2020
- Media: 500GB 5400 RPM
- Operating system: Microsoft Windows
- CPU: Intel Core i5 Intel Core i7
- Memory: 6.0GB DDR3L 1600 MHz
- Storage: 500 GB 5400 RPM/1 TB
- Display: 14.1 in (36 cm); 15.6 in (40 cm)
- Graphics: Intel HD 520 or AMD Ryzen
- Sound: Stereo Speakers with Dolby Advanced Audio certification or JBL
- Input: Keyboard; DVD drive (V330 (15")); Fingerprint reader
- Camera: Camera with integrated microphone ^{(Front-facing)}
- Touchpad: ClickPad
- Connectivity: 2 SuperSpeed USB 3.0 inputs, 1 HDMI output, 1 RJ-45 Ethernet Cable input, 1 VGA port, 2 USB Type-C ports, 4-in-1 Card Reader (SD, SDHC, SDXC, MMC) and a headphone/microphone port
- Dimensions: (inches) : 16.45" x 11.51" x 0.99" (mm) : 418 x 292.6 x 25.1
- Weight: 4.8 lb (2.2 kg) / 1.02” (26 mm); 5.7 lb (2.6 kg) / 1.02” (25.95 mm); 7.7 lb (3.5 kg) / 1.1” (27.95 mm)

The Lenovo V330 series was a class of home and small business professional PCs. The V330 series are respectively an 14-inch and 15-inch laptops designed specifically. It was developed by Lenovo in 2018. Both make use of Intel Core i5 or i7 processors. Inches of laptop:

- V330 (14")
- V330 (15")

=== 2011 ===
The V Series laptops released by Lenovo in 2011 were the V370, V470 and V570.

The 2011 Lenovo V Series laptops offered screen sizes of 13.3 inches, 14 inches, and 15.6 inches respectively, with maximum resolutions of 1366x768 pixels. The laptops could be equipped with up to Intel Core i7 processors and up to 8GB of RAM. The laptops also offered up to 1TB hard disk drives, WiFi b/g/n, Bluetooth, USB 2.0 ports, a HDMI port, and an eSATA port. The V370 offered NVIDIA GeForce 315M 1GB graphics while the V470 and V570 offered GeForce 525M 2GB graphics.

=== 2010 ===
The laptops released in the Essential range of V Series laptops in 2010 were the V360, V460, and V560.

==== V360 ====
The Lenovo V360, released in 2010, offered the following specifications:

- Processor: Intel Core i3-330M
- Graphics: NVIDIA GeForce 305M
- Display: 13.3" (16:9, maximum resolution of 1366 x 768)
- Weight: 1.75 kg

==== V460 ====
The Lenovo V460 was summed up by LAPTOP Magazine as: “It looks great and has switchable graphics, but this lightweight notebook for small businesses doesn’t last long enough on a charge.”

The V460 offered the following specifications:

- Processor: 2.27 GHz Core i5-430M
- Memory: up to 8GB
- Storage: 320GB 7200 RPM SATA
- Graphics:
  - Intel Graphics Media Accelerator HD
  - NVIDIA GeForce 310M
- Dimensions (inches): 13.3 × 9.2 × 1.0
- Weight: 4.8 lbs

==== V560 ====
The Lenovo V560 offered the following specifications:

- Processor: 2.4 GHz Intel Core i3-370M
- Chipset: Intel HM55
- Memory: up to 4GB
- Graphics: NVIDIA GeForce 310M
- Display: 15.6" (16:9, maximum resolution of 1366 x 768)
- Storage: 640GB 5400RPM
- Dimensions (mm): 377 × 250 × 30
