= Gottlob Bauknecht =

German businessman and engineer

Gottlob Bauknecht (30 April 1892 in Neckartenzlingen – 9 September 1976 in Stuttgart) was a German businessman and engineer.

== Life ==
Bauknecht founded his own company Bauknecht for electrical household appliance. He was married and had two sons, Gert und Günter. He was buried on the Waldfriedhof in Stuttgart-Degerloch.

== Awards ==
- 1952: Order of Merit of the Federal Republic of Germany
- 1967: Decoration of Honour for Services to the Republic of Austria
