= Symphony Xplorer V55 =

2015 Android smartphone by Symphony Mobile

- Brand: Symphony
- Type: Smartphone
- Series: Xplorer
- First released: 2015, January
- Compatible networks: 2G, 3G
- Dimensions: 134×68.2×9.9 mm (5.28×2.69×0.39 in)
- Weight: 145 g (5 oz)
- Operating system: Android v4.4.2 KitKat
- CPU: 1.3 GHz Quad-Core
- GPU: Mali 400
- Memory: 512 MB RAM
- Storage: 4 GB
- Removable storage: up to 32 GB
- Battery: 1700 mAh
- Rear camera: 5 MP
- Front camera: 2 MP
- Display: 4.5 in
- Connectivity: Wi-Fi, Bluetooth, USB

The Symphony Xplorer V55 is an Android smartphone manufactured by Symphony Mobile. It was introduced in January, 2015.

== Features ==
- Network: 2G, 3G
- SIM: Dual SIM
- Rear Camera: 5 MP
- Front Camera: 2 MP
- Memory: 512 MB RAM
- Storage: 4 GB
- Battery: 1700 mAh
- Size: 4.5 In
- Operating System: Android 4.4.2 KitKat
- CPU: 1.3 GHz Quad-Core
- Dimensions: 134 X 68.2 X 9.9 mm
- Sensors: Accelerometer, Proximity, Light, G-Sensor
- Weight: 145 g
- TFT G+F touchscreen
- Browser: HTML
