= Lenovo Essential desktops =

Series of personal computers

Lenovo's line of Essential desktops was a collection of budget-conscious machines designed for consumers, and advertised as being "affordable, space saving, and energy efficient". The Essential desktop line was, at the time, different from both Lenovo's ThinkCentre line and Lenovo's IdeaCentre line. Lenovo defined its ThinkCentre desktops as business-oriented computers, while the IdeaCentre desktops were meant primarily for entertainment. The Essential range of desktops could be categorized as being between the two – meant more for ordinary everyday use.

The Essential desktops were frequently (and erroneously) referred to as IdeaCentre desktops. For example, Desktop Review indicated that the C300 was an IdeaCentre. However, the Lenovo U.S. Web site indicates that the C300 is part of their value line, or 'Essential' line. The only brand associated with these desktops is 'Lenovo' – 'Essential' represents a range of products and is not a brand in itself.

== Product withdrawal ==
The “Essential" budget desktop line by Lenovo was sold around 2009–2013, then withdrew. Lenovo’s own PSREF archive has a “Essential Desktops — withdrawn” booklet that lists C- and H-series models like the C300 and C315 and marks them as withdrawn, with last updates in 2010–2013.

== Withdrawn product series ==
There were two lines of Lenovo-branded desktops sold under the 'Essential' banner. These were:

- C Series
- H Series

=== C Series ===
The Lenovo C Series desktops launched by Lenovo are the C100, C200, C300, and C315.

==== 2010 ====
The Lenovo C Series desktops launched in 2010 were the C200 and C315.

===== C200 =====
The C200 was an All-in-one (AIO) desktop launched by Lenovo in April 2010. Hardware Bistro indicated that the desktop had entry-level specifications, making it more affordable than the B500. The review also indicated that the desktop's unique selling point was its 18.5 inch Touchscreen display.

The desktop was made available with the Intel Atom D510 processor, 2 GB of RAM, and could be configured for up to 500 GB storage capacity. The desktop offered options for both integrated and discrete graphics. The integrated graphics option on offer was Intel GMA 3150, while the discrete graphics option was the Nvidia Ion graphics card with 256 MB of video RAM. Additional features on the desktop included a DVD multiburner, an integrated Web camera, integrated stereo speakers, LAN, and WiFi.

===== C315 =====
The C315 was released in 2010 by Lenovo. In its review, silentpcreview said that the "C315 is one of the more interesting all-in-one PCs with which we've crossed paths." The C315 was equipped with an AMD Athlon II X2 250u processor – a low voltage processor with a speed of 1.6 GHz. The hard disk storage capacity on the desktop was 500 GB. The desktop also offered discrete graphics, with an ATI Mobility Radeon HD4530 graphics card. The desktop also offered 4 GB of DDR2 RAM and a slim dual-layer DVD writer.

Detailed specifications of the desktop are given below:

- Chipset: AMD 690M
- ATSC Tuner: Built-in
- Networking: 10/100 Ethernet, 802.11g
- Card Reader: 6-in-1
- Webcam: 0.3 megapixel (maximum resolution of 640x480)
- USB Ports: 6 USB 2.0
- Operating System: Microsoft Windows 7 Professional x64
- Dimensions: 19.05 x 14.12 x 2.56 inches
- Weight: 16.3 lbs

==== 2009 ====
The Lenovo C Series desktops launched in 2009 by Lenovo were the C100 and C300.

===== C100 =====
Announced in September 2009, the C100 was an All-in-one (AIO) desktop designed for consumer use. The 18.5 inch display was 2 inches deep, with an aspect ratio of 16:9. The desktop also included software such as Lenovo's OneKey Antivirus and OneKey Recovery that allowed one-button system scanning and restoration. The dimensions of the desktop were 18.5 x 14.5 x 4 inches. The desktop also was made available with options for either Intel Atom 230 single core processors, or Intel Atom 330 dual core processors. In addition, the desktop also included a DVD reader/writer and four USB ports.

===== C300 =====
The C300 was an AIO launched in 2009 as part of Lenovo's Essential product line. Desktop Review listed the pros of the desktop as the good 20-inch display with a resolution of 1600x900, the 3.5 inch hard disk drive, and the optional discrete graphics. The cons were listed as the keyboard, and the standard single core Intel Atom 230 1.6 GHz processor. The desktop's dimensions were 19.05 x 14.12 x 3.28 inches.

Additional specifications of the desktop are as follows:

- Operating system: Windows Vista Home Basic
- Memory: 3 GB DDR2
- Hard drive: 320 GB
- Optical drive: 8X DVD+/-RW
- Audio: Integrated HD audio
- Speakers: built-in
- Graphics: Intel GMA 950
- Wireless networking: 802.11b/g
- Card reader: Built-in SDHC memory card reader

=== H Series ===
The Lenovo H Series desktops launched by Lenovo are the H200, H210, H215, H230, H320, and H405.

==== 2011 ====
The Lenovo H Series desktops released in 2011 were the H215, H220, and H320.

===== H215 =====
The H215 offered AMD Athlon II X2 dual core processors, 2 GB of DDR3 RAM, and a 320 GB hard disk drive. Additional, detailed specifications for the H215 are given below:

- Chipset: AMD 760G
- Graphics: ATI Radeon HD 3000 (integrated)
- Optical drive: dual layer DVD reader/writer
- Audio: integrated HD audio
- Media Card reader: integrated, 16-in-1
- Operating system: Microsoft Windows 7 Home Premium (32-bit)
- USB ports: 6 USB 2.0

===== H220 =====
The specifications of the H220 desktop are as follows:

- Operating System: DOS
- Processor: 3 GHz Intel E5500
- RAM: 2 GB DDR3
- Storage: 320 GB
- Optical drive: DVD reader/writer

===== H320 =====
The H320 was a small form factor desktop in the Lenovo H Series desktop line released in 2011. Desktop review called the H320 "a little - but not too little - box that does it all". Desktop Review listed the pros of the desktop as the Blu-ray drive, the Intel Core i5 processor, and the small form factor. The cons were indicated to be the low graphics capabilities, few USB ports, and the lack of wireless networking.

Detailed specifications of the desktop are given below:

- Processor: 3.20 GHz Intel Core i5-650
- RAM: 6 GB DDR3
- Storage: 640 GB 7200 RPM SATA2
- Operating system: Windows 7 Home Premium 64-bit
- Optical drive:
  - Blu-ray ROM
  - DVD reader/writer
- Graphics: Nvidia GeForce 310

==== 2010 ====
The Lenovo H Series desktop launched in 2010 was the H230.

===== H230 =====
The H230 was launched at the same time as the Lenovo IdeaCentre K300 desktop. The desktop offered an Intel Core 2 Duo processor, Intel GMA integrated graphics, 4 GB of RAM, a 640 GB hard disk drive, and a DVD reader/writer.

==== 2009 ====
The Lenovo H Series desktops released in 2009 were the H200 and the H210.

===== H200 =====
The H200 was announced by Lenovo at CES 2009. It offered the Intel Atom 230 processor, 1 GB of RAM, and a 160 GB hard disk drive. It was Lenovo's first desktop with the low power Intel Atom processor. The CPU incorporated a fanless design, minimizing desktop noise and, according to tech2, made the H200 Lenovo's quietest desktop. The display was 15.4 inch Thin-film Transistor (TFT) screen.

===== H210 =====
The Lenovo H210 was also released in 2009 as part of the Essential range of desktops. PCWorld listed the pros of the desktop as above average performance for a desktop that cost less than US$500. The cons were listed as average expandability. Although PCWorld reported that the desktop was "one of the better sub-$500 systems", it was reported not to handle games well. The inability to handle games came from the integrated graphics – Intel GMA 3100 graphics. The H210 could not run PCWorld's Unreal Tournament 3 benchmark and offered only 24 frames per second on Far Cry (at a resolution of 1280x1024 with no antialiasing).

Additional specifications of the H210 include:

- Processor: 2.5 GHz Intel Pentium Dual Core E5200
- RAM: 4 GB DDR2-667
- Storage: 500 GB
- Operating System: Microsoft Windows Vista Home Premium (32 bit)
- PCI Express x16 slot: 1
- PCI Express x1 slot: 2
- PCI slot: 1
- Optical drivel: DVD reader/writer
- USB ports: 6

==== 2008 ====
The Lenovo H Series desktop released in 2008 was the H215.

===== H215 =====
The H215, released in October 2008, was an entry-level addition to Lenovo's Essential line of budget PCs. It was praised for its large storage capacity - a total of 1 TB. While performance was reported by About.com to be "decent", it was indicated that options to upgrade the desktop were limited. This was due to the low-wattage power supply commonly used in small form factor PCs as opposed to traditional tower PCs. Another point not in the desktop's favor was the recessed optical drive. This was described by About.com as being difficult to open and appearing out of place.

Detailed specification of the desktop are as follows:

- Processor: AMD Athlon II X2 250 Dual Core
- RAM: 4 GB PC3-8500 DDR3
- Storage: 1 TB 7200rpm SATA Hard Drive
- Optical drive: 16x DVD+/-RW Dual Layer Burner
- Graphics: ATI Radeon HD 3000 Integrated Graphics Processor
- Audio: 7.1 Audio Support
- Ports and slots: six USB 2.0, HDMI, VGA, 16-in-1 Card Reader
