= Bauknecht (company) =

Household appliance manufacturer in Germany

Bauknecht Hausgeräte GmbH
- Type: Subsidiary
- Founded: 1919; 107 years ago, in Neckartenzlingen, Germany
- Founder: Gottlob Bauknecht
- Fate: Acquired by Whirlpool Corporation in 1989
- Headquarters: Stuttgart, Germany
- Key people: Jens-Christoph Bidlingmaier, chairman of the board Gerald Bormann, supervisory board chairman
- Products: Domestic appliances
- Revenue: 290 million euro (2014)
- Number of employees: 400 (2014)
- Parent: Arçelik/Whirlpool Corporation
- Website: www.bauknecht.eu

Bauknecht Hausgeräte GmbH, commonly referred as Bauknecht, is one of Germany's leading manufacturers of household appliances, and since 2024 a brand of Beko. The headquarters of the company was in Schorndorf in Baden-Württemberg until 2006 when it relocated to Stuttgart. Whirlpool has closed its three plants in Calw (refrigerators/freezers), Neunkirchen (dishwashers) and Schorndorf (washers and dryers). Since 2012 all Bauknecht branded products have been manufactured outside Germany.

== History ==
The company was founded in 1919 by Gottlob Bauknecht as an electrical workshop in Neckartenzlingen. He received recognition for the first time for his self-developed universal electric motor "Landfreund".

But it was only in the postwar Germany when the company made its big step in the production of electrical appliances, starting in 1948 with the kitchen appliances "Allfix". In 1951, the first Bauknecht refrigerator was produced, in 1958 the first washing machine, and in 1964 the first dishwasher.

On 9 September 1976, the company founder died at the age of 84 years, leaving his sons the management. Because of some loss-making foreign investments and the withdrawal of banks from other financing commitments, on 13 May 1982 a settlement was requested. On 29 October 1982, the District Court of Stuttgart paved the way for bankruptcy over the assets of Bauknecht. On 2 November 1982 Volker Grub, the liquidator, signed a takeover agreement with the German division of Philips (Deutsche Philips Industrie AG).

Since 1989, Bauknecht Hausgeräte GmbH has been part of the American group Whirlpool Corporation. The Neunkirchen facility in Saarland developed and built dishwashers from 1971. In 1996, the European Technology Centre for dishwashers was also settled in Neunkirchen. The Global Development Center for washing machines and dryers, in which the large volume washers for the US market were produced was sited in Schorndorf.

At the beginning of 2012, the automotive supplier ZF Friedrichshafen took over the plant in Neunkirchen with 240 out of the 280 local employees, in order to expand its production capacity in transmission components. After retraining, the employees who previously mounted dishwashers, manufactured vehicle transmissions. At the end of 2012 the production site in Schorndorf also closed.

Since 2024, Bauknecht has been part of the joint venture "Beko Europe" of Arçelik and Whirlpool and is now subordinate to Beko.
