= Beko =

Turkish brand of home appliances

Beko Elektronik
- Type: Anonim Şirket
- Industry: Major appliances Small appliances Electronics; Technology
- Founded: 1955; 71 years ago in Istanbul, Turkey
- Founders: Vehbi Koç; Leon Bejerano
- Fate: Merged with its parent company
- Headquarters: Istanbul, Turkey
- Area served: Worldwide
- Revenue: ▲€12.085 billion (2024)
- Operating income: ▼€162 million (2024)
- Net income: ▼€62 million (2024)
- Total assets: ▲€11.216 billion (2024)
- Owner: Arçelik A.Ş.
- Parent: Koç Holding
- Website: www.bekocorporate.com

Beko (/ˈbɛkoʊ/ BEK-oh) is a Turkish white goods and electronics brand of Arçelik A.Ş., which is controlled by the Koç Holding conglomerate.

== History ==
Beko Elektronik A.Ş. was founded by Vehbi Koç, the founder of Koç Holding (who also founded Arçelik A.Ş. in 1955, which is currently the parent company of Beko, Grundig and Indesit as of 2022), and Leon Bejerano in Istanbul, Turkey, in 1954. The company's name is a combination of the first two letters of the founders' surnames, Bejerano and Koç.

In 2004, Beko Elektronik purchased the German electronics company Grundig and by January 2005, Beko and its rival, Turkish electronics and white goods brand Vestel, accounted for more than half of all TV sets manufactured in Europe.

In April 2010, the electronics division of Beko renamed itself as Grundig Elektronik A.Ş.

At the Extraordinary General Shareholders Meeting of Arçelik A.Ş. on 29 June 2009, it was decided to merge Arçelik A.Ş. with the company's subsidiary, Grundig Elektronik A.Ş. (to be administered directly by Arçelik A.Ş. of Koç Holding) by taking over all of Grundig's assets and liabilities as a whole.

Beko started selling its products in Egypt in 2014 and, in June of that year, the company updated its logo.

In India, Beko formed a joint venture with Tata Group subsidiary Voltas in 2017 to produce home appliances like TVs, dishwashers, and washing machines under the Voltas Beko brand.

In the year 2024, Beko Europe, the joint venture of Arçelik and Whirlpool, was formed. Bauknecht and other brands are now subordinate to Beko.

== Products ==
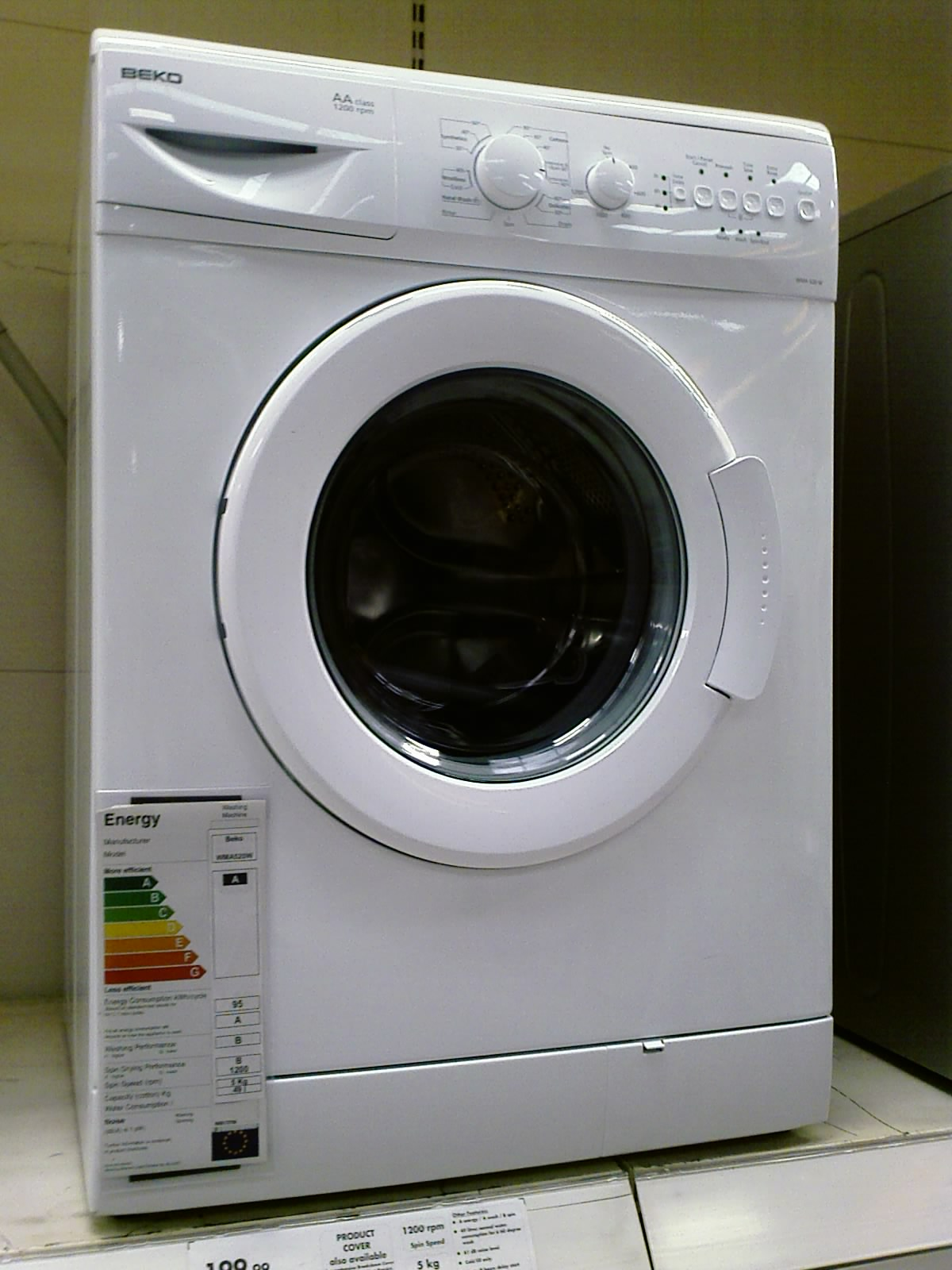
A Beko washing machine, which has 1200 RPM spin and A rating

Beko is a budget brand name in some countries and continues to be in use for a number of Arçelik A.Ş. products such as television sets, refrigerators, washing machines and dishwashers, in several countries.

== Incidents ==
Some Beko products have posed a safety risk to consumers who have bought them. In 2016, Mishell Moloney was found dead due to a fault with a Beko drying machine that had caught fire. Beko tried to claim that the fault that led to Moloney's death was a 'tragic and isolated incident.' However, the DCS 85W drying machine which was used by Moloney was already responsible for some twenty fires in the UK. Beko quality control chief, Andrew Mullin, also revealed that the smaller models in the range, had already been recalled due to hundreds of safety incidents.

== Sponsorships ==
Beko has been the official sponsor of the Turkish, Italian and Lithuanian premier basketball leagues, as well as the 2014 FIBA Basketball World Cup in Spain. Beko is a partner of the Spanish football club FC Barcelona since 2014 and Turkish football club Beşiktaş JK (having previously been their shirt sponsor from 1988 to 2004) and Turkmen football club FC HTTU. Furthermore, it had been one of the largest advertisers in the English Premier League since 2008, and an official sponsor of the FA Cup. Beko sponsored Millwall F.C. in the 2005–06 season.

Between 2016 and 2020, Beko was the main sponsor of Netball New Zealand's National Netball League.

Beko is a premier sponsor of Volley Lube.

== Former logos ==
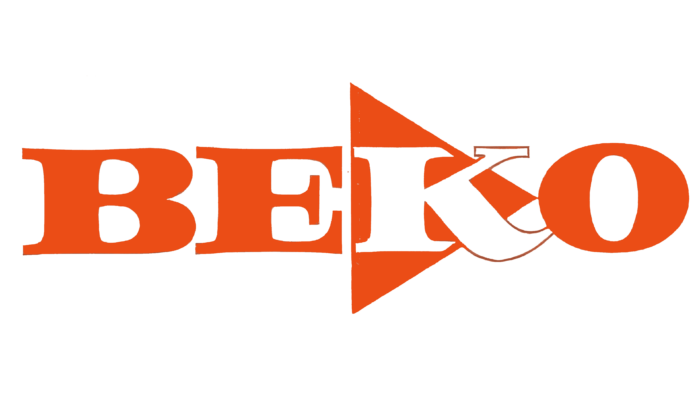
Beko logo (1955–1986)

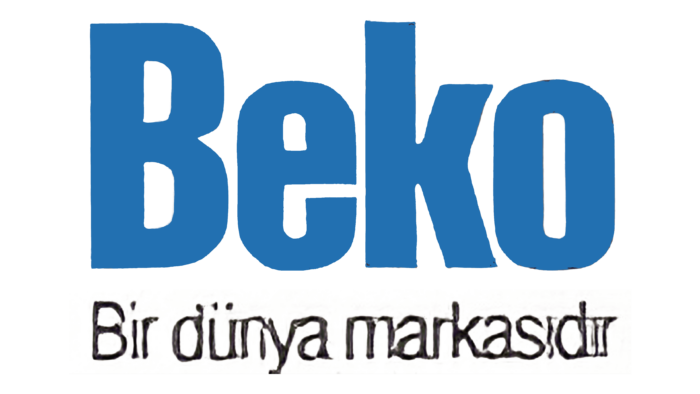
Logo (1986–1993)

Logo (1993–2014)
