= List of Turkish people by net worth =

The list of Turkish people by net worth is based on an annual ranking by documented net worth of the wealthiest billionaires in Turkey, compiled and published in March annually by the American business magazine Forbes.

== Methodology ==
Each year, Forbes employs a team of more than 50 reporters from a variety of countries to track the activity of the world's wealthiest individuals. Preliminary surveys are sent to those who may qualify for the list. According to Forbes, they received three types of responses – some people try to inflate their wealth, others cooperate but leave out details, and some refuse to answer any questions. Business deals are then scrutinized and estimates of valuable assets – land, homes, vehicles, artwork, etc. – are made. Interviews are conducted to vet the figures and improve the estimate of an individual's holdings. Finally, positions in a publicly traded stock are priced to market on a date roughly a month before publication. Privately held companies are priced by the prevailing price-to-sales or price-to-earnings ratios. Known debt is subtracted from assets to get a final estimate of an individual's estimated worth in United States dollars. Since stock prices fluctuate rapidly, an individual's true wealth and ranking at the time of publication may vary from their situation when the list was compiled.

Family fortunes dispersed over a large number of relatives are included only if those individuals' holdings are worth more than a billion dollars. However, when a living individual has dispersed his or her wealth to immediate family members, it is included under a single listing provided that individual is still living. Royal families and dictators that have their wealth contingent on a position are always excluded from these lists.

== Annual rankings ==
The rankings are published annually in March, so the net worths listed are snapshots taken at that time.

=== Ledger ===
Icon	Description
Steady	Has not changed from the previous ranking.
▲	Has increased from the previous ranking.
▼	Has decreased from the previous ranking.

=== 2026 Turkish Billionaires List ===
Billionaires in Turkey according to Forbes 2026
Turkey Rank	World Rank	Name	Net worth (USD)	Source(s) of wealth
1	206	Hamdi Ulukaya	$13.9 billion ▲	Chobani
2	800	Murat Ülker	$5.3 billion ▼	Yıldız Holding
3	860	Saban Cemil Kazanci	$4.9 billion ▲	Kazancı Holding
3	860	Eren Özmen	$4.9 billion ▲	Sierra Nevada Corporation
5	910	Fatih Özmen	$4.7 billion ▲	Sierra Nevada Corporation
5	910	Uğur Şahin	$4.7 billion ▲	BioNTech
7	1,128	Erman Ilıcak	$3.8 billion ▲	Rönesans Holding
8	1,370	Ferit Faik Şahenk	$3.2 billion ▲	Doğuş Group
9	1,412	Semahat Sevim Arsel	$3 billion ▼	Koç Holding
10	1,470	Filiz Şahenk	$2.9 billion ▲	Doğuş Group
11	1,476	Feridun Geçgel	$2.8 billion ▲	Astor Enerji
12	1,540	İpek Kıraç	$2.7 billion ▼	Koç Holding
12	1,548	Selçuk Bayraktar	$2.7 billion ▲	Baykar
14	1,600	Rahmi Koç	$2.6 billion ▼	Koç Holding
15	1,650	Mehmet Sinan Tara	$2.5 billion	Enka İnşaat ve Sanayi A.Ş.
16	1,700	Haluk Bayraktar	$2.4 billion ▲	Baykar
17	1,750	Ahmet Çalık	$2.3 billion ▲	Çalık Holding
18	1,800	Mustafa Küçük	$2.2 billion ▲	LC Waikiki
19	1,850	Mehmet Ali Aydınlar	$2.1 billion ▲	Acıbadem Healthcare Group
20	1,950	Şefik Yılmaz Dizdar	$2 billion ▲	LC Waikiki
20	1,950	Hüsnü Özyeğin	$2 billion ▲	Fiba Holding
20	1,950	Sezai Bacaksız	$2 billion ▲	Limak Holding
20	1,950	Nihat Özdemir	$2 billion ▲	Limak Holding
24	2,100	Hamdi Akın and family	$1.8 billion ▲	Akfen Holding
25	2,250	Bülent Eczacıbaşı	$1.6 billion ▲	Eczacıbaşı Holding
25	2,250	Deniz Şahenk	$1.6 billion ▲	Doğuş Group
27	2,350	Turgay Ciner	$1.5 billion	Ciner Group
28	2,600	Kazım Türker	$1.3 billion ▼	Energy, diversified
28	2,600	Faruk Eczacıbaşı	$1.3 billion ▲	Eczacıbaşı Holding
28	2,600	Emre Tezmen	$1.3 billion	Tera Holding
31	3,017	Ibrahim Erdemoğlu	$1.2 billion ▼	SASA Polyester
31	2,950	Mustafa Latif Topbaş	$1.2 billion	BİM
31	2,950	Ceyda Lale Tara	$1.2 billion	Enka İnşaat ve Sanayi A.Ş.
31	2,950	Yasemin Zeynep Keyman	$1.2 billion	Enka İnşaat ve Sanayi A.Ş.
31	2,950	Leyla Tara Suyabatmaz	$1.2 billion	Enka İnşaat ve Sanayi A.Ş.
36	3,150	Vildan Gülçelik	$1.1 billion	Gülçelik Group
36	3,150	Mehmet Kazancı	$1.1 billion	Kazancı Holding
36	3,150	Ahmed Afif Topbaş	$1.1 billion	BİM
36	3,185	Ali Erdemoğlu	$1.1 billion ▼	SASA Polyester
36	3,150	Oğuz Tezmen	$1.1 billion	Tera Holding
38	3,250	Ömer Yiğit Kemik	$1 billion	Asilsoy Holding
41	3,350	Murat Vargı	$1 billion ▼	Turkcell
41	3,350	Aydın Doğan	$1 billion ▼	Doğan Holding
41	3,350	Tülay Kazancı	$1 billion	Kazancı Holding

=== 2023 Turkish Billionaires List ===
Billionaires in Turkey according to Forbes 2023
Turkey Rank	World Rank	Name	Net worth (USD)	Source(s) of wealth
1	497	Ibrahim Erdemoğlu	$5.3 billion ▲	SASA Polyester
2	534	Murat Ülker	$5 billion ▲	Yıldız Holding
3	580	Ali Erdemoğlu	$4.7 billion ▲	SASA Polyester
4	982	Semahat Sevim Arsel	$3 billion ▲	Koç Holding
5	1,027	İpek Kıraç	$2.9 billion ▲	Koç Holding
6	1,104	Rahmi Koç	$2.7 billion ▲	Koç Holding
7	1,217	Saban Cemil Kazanci	$2.5 billion	Kazancı Holding
7	1,217	Ferit Şahenk	$2.5 billion ▲	Doğuş Group
9	1,312	Erman Ilıcak	$2.3 billion ▼	Rönesans Holding
9	1,312	Filiz Şahenk	$2.3 billion ▲	Doğuş Group
11	1,368	Sezai Bacaksız	$2.2 billion ▲	Limak Holding
12	1,434	Hamdi Ulukaya	$2.1 billion ▼	Chobani
13	1,575	Bülent Eczacıbaşı	$1.9 billion ▲	Eczacıbaşı Holding
13	1,575	Faruk Eczacıbaşı	$1.9 billion ▲	Eczacıbaşı Holding
13	1,575	Mehmet Sinan Tara	$1.9 billion ▲	Enka İnşaat ve Sanayi A.Ş.
16	1,647	Nihat Özdemir	$1.8 billion ▼	Limak Holding
17	1,725	Mustafa Küçük	$1.7 billion ▲	LC Waikiki
18	1,905	Hamdi Akın	$1.5 billion	Akfen Holding
18	1,905	Ahmet Çalık	$1.5 billion	Çalık Holding
20	2,133	Aydın Doğan	$1.3 billion ▲	Doğan Holding
20	2,133	Deniz Şahenk	$1.3 billion	Doğuş Group
22	2,259	Mehmet Ali Aydınlar	$1.2 billion	Acıbadem Healthcare Group
22	2,259	Şefik Yılmaz Dizdar	$1.2 billion ▲	LC Waikiki
24	2,405	Ali Metin Kazancı	$1.1 billion	Kazancı Holding
25	2,540	Turgay Ciner	$1 billion ▼	Ciner Group
25	2,540	Hanefi Öksüz	$1 billion ▲	Kipaş Holding

=== 2017 Turkish Billionaires List ===
Billionaires in Turkey in 2017 according to Forbes
World Rank	Name	Net worth (USD)	Source of wealth
660	Hüsnü Özyeğin	3.0 billion	Finance, diversified
867	Semahat Sevim Arsel	2.4 billion	Diversified
867	Şarık Tara	2.4 billion	Construction
896	Erman Ilıcak	2.3 billion	Construction
939	Rahmi Koç	2.2 billion	Diversified
973	Ferit Şahenk	2.1 billion	Banking, media
1030	Suna Kıraç	2.0 billion	Diversified
1098	Mustafa Küçük	1.9 billion	Fashion retail
1098	Filiz Şahenk	1.9 billion	Banking, media
1234	Hamdi Ulukaya	1.7 billion	Chobani yogurt
1290	Sezai Bacaksız	1.6 billion	Diversified
1290	Turgay Ciner	1.6 billion	Diversified
1290	Mehmet Nazif Günal	1.6 billion	Tourism, construction
1290	Nihat Özdemir	1.6 billion	Diversified
1376	Bülent Eczacıbaşı	1.5 billion	Pharmaceuticals, diversified
1376	Faruk Eczacıbaşı	1.5 billion	Pharmaceuticals, diversified
1468	Ahmet Çalık	1.4 billion	Energy, banking, construction
1567	Ahmet Nazif Zorlu	1.3 billion	Diversified
1678	Mehmet Ali Aydınlar	1.2 billion	Hospitals
1678	Şefik Yılmaz Dizdar	1.2 billion	Fashion retail
1678	Mehmet Sinan Tara	1.2 billion	Construction
1795	Mehmet Rüştü Başaran	1.1 billion	Banking, gas
1795	Deniz Şahenk	1.1 billion	Banking, media
1940	Ali Ağaoğlu	1.0 billion	Construction
1940	Hamdi Akın	1.0 billion	Diversified
1940	Mustafa Latif Topbaş	1.0 billion	Food manufacturing, retail
1940	Murat Vargı	1.0 billion	Telecom

== See also ==
- The World's Billionaires
- List of countries by the number of billionaires
