= Yerevan Mall =

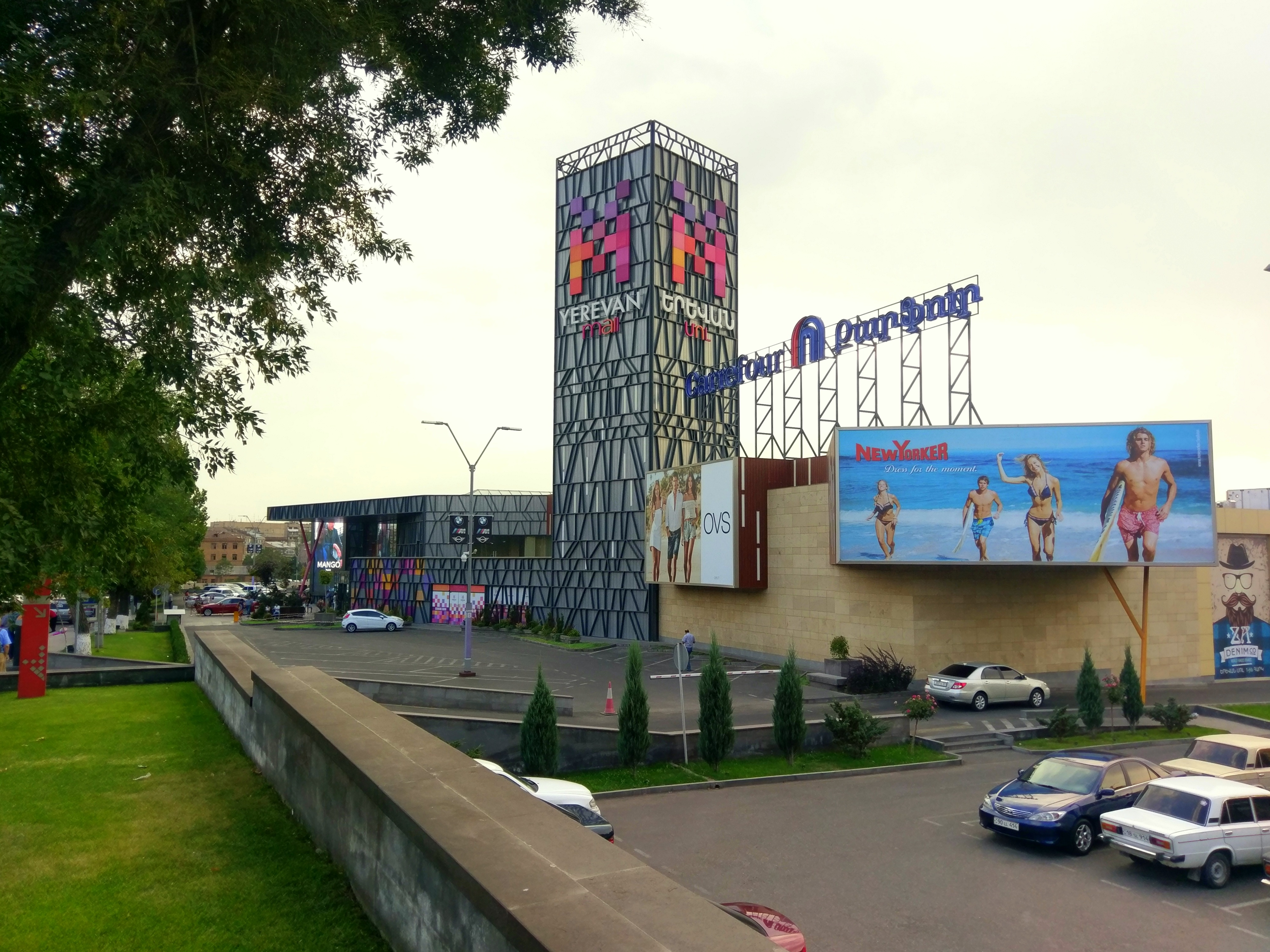
- Location: Shengavit district, Yerevan, Armenia
- Coordinates: 40°09′20″N 44°29′58″E
- Opened: 14 February 2014
- Architect: Archangel Architectural Studio
- Num. of stores: 125
- Floor area: 59,000 square metres (640,000 sq ft)
- Floors: 3
- Website: www.yerevanmall.am

Yerevan Mall (Armenian: Երևան Մոլ) is a shopping mall located on Arshakunyats Avenue, Yerevan, Armenia. Opened in 2014, it is the second largest mall in Armenia in terms of number of stores and total floor area.

A Carrefour hypermarket was opened in the mall on 11 March 2015. KinoPark, a movie theater, and Captain Kid's treasure island, the second biggest indoor entertainment center in Armenia, are located at Yerevan Mall. Yerevan Mall operates under the management of Galaxy Group of Companies, a holding company founded in 1999.

== History ==
Yerevan Mall shopping centre was opened on 20 February 2014, with the presence of former Armenian president Serzh Sargsyan. The project was launched in late 2010. The centre covers an area of 59,000 square metres (640,000 sq ft) and houses 125 stores.

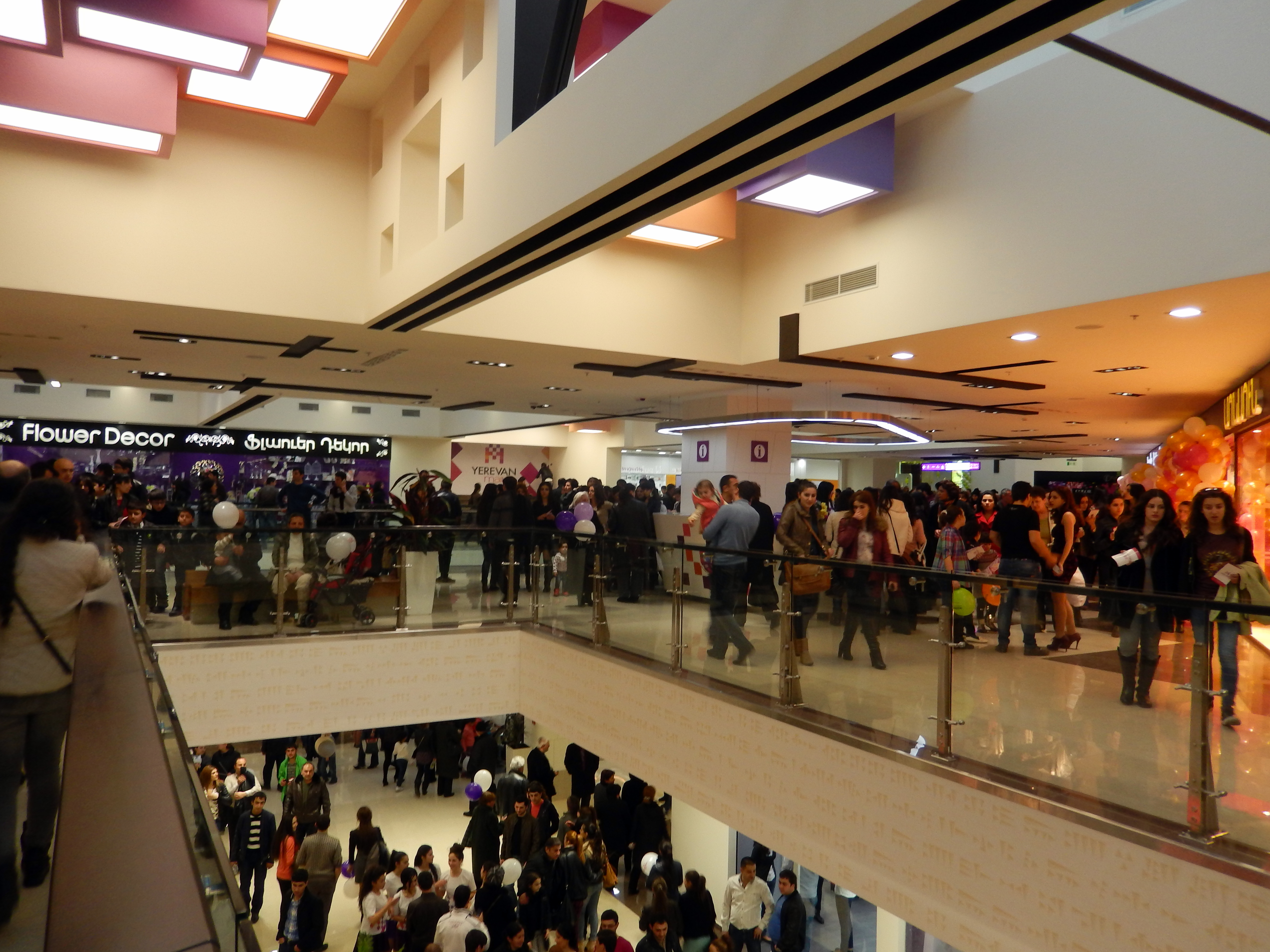
Yerevan Mall during the opening ceremony

In 2014, Captain Kid's treasure island, the biggest indoor entertainment center in Armenia, was opened at Yerevan Mall.

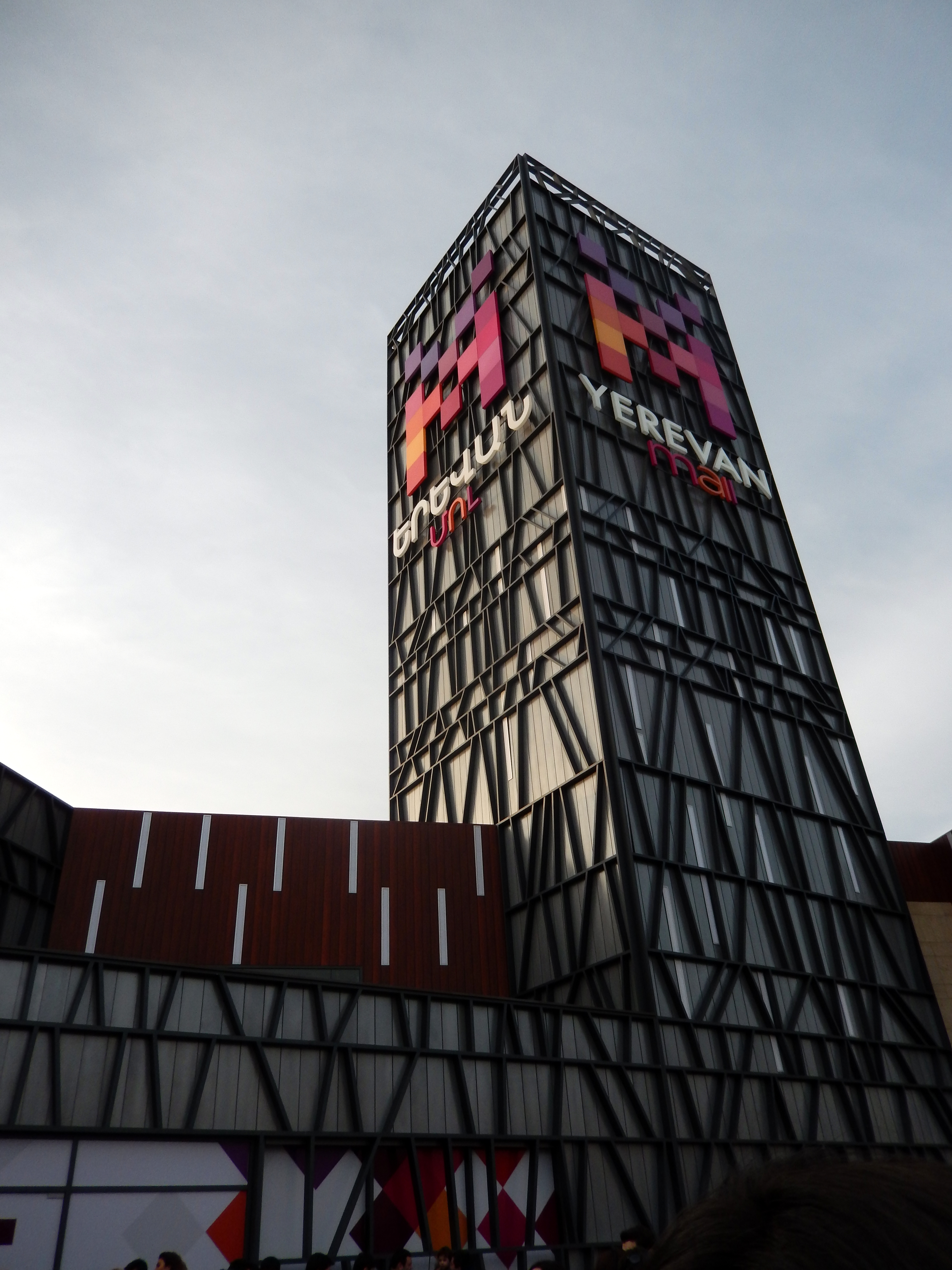
The tower of Yerevan Mall

In 2015, the first and only Carrefour hypermarket in Armenia was opened at Yerevan Mall.

In 2015, KinoPark multiplex movie theater was opened at Yerevan Mall.

In 2016, the only Mango Man in Armenia was opened at Yerevan Mall.

== Entertainment ==
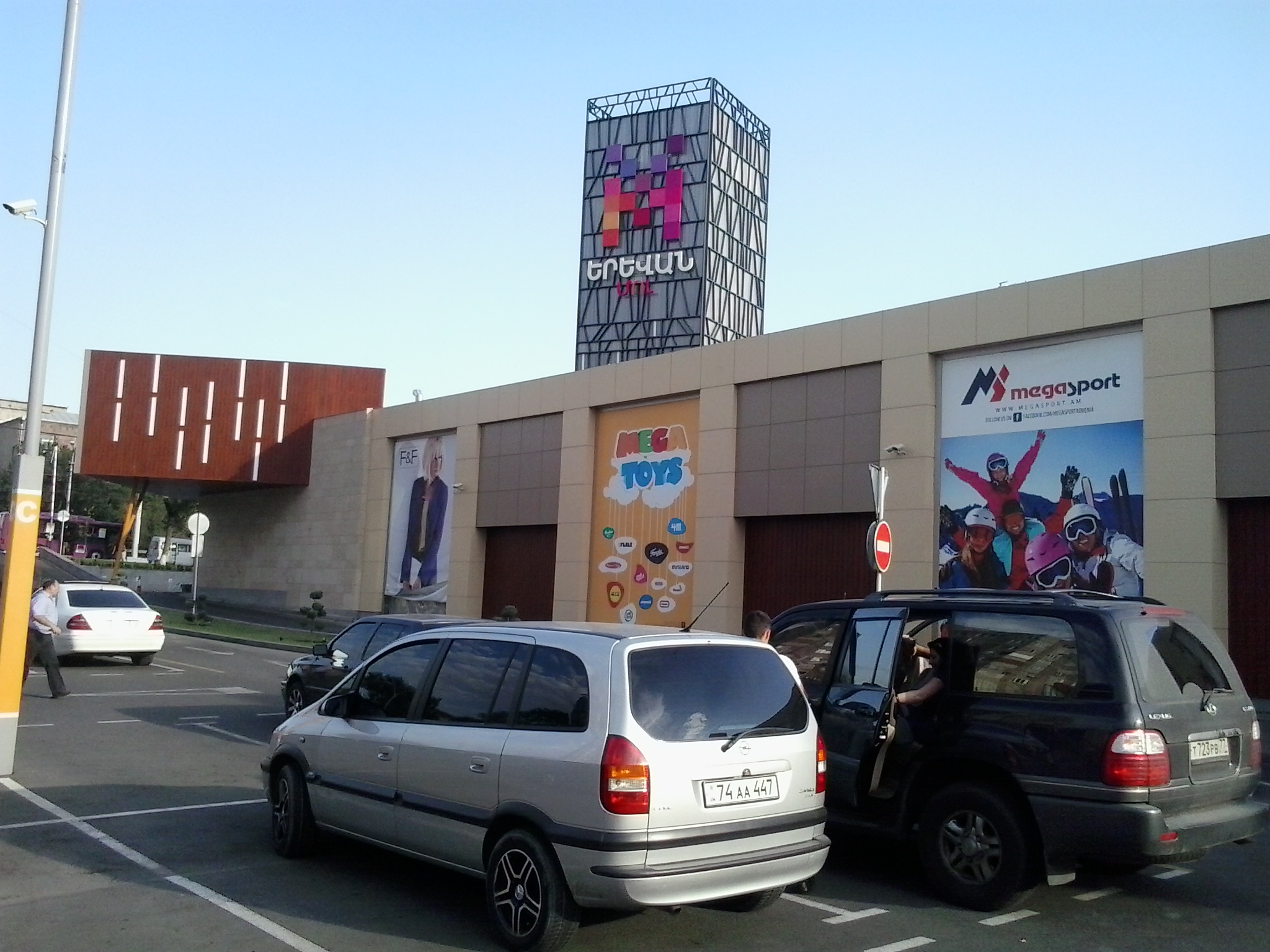
the outdoor parking lot

On 5 December 2015, the KinoPark multiplex movie theater was opened in the mall. The mall has a number of cafes and a big food court with more than 20 operators, providing foods from 12 cuisines of the world.

== Stores ==
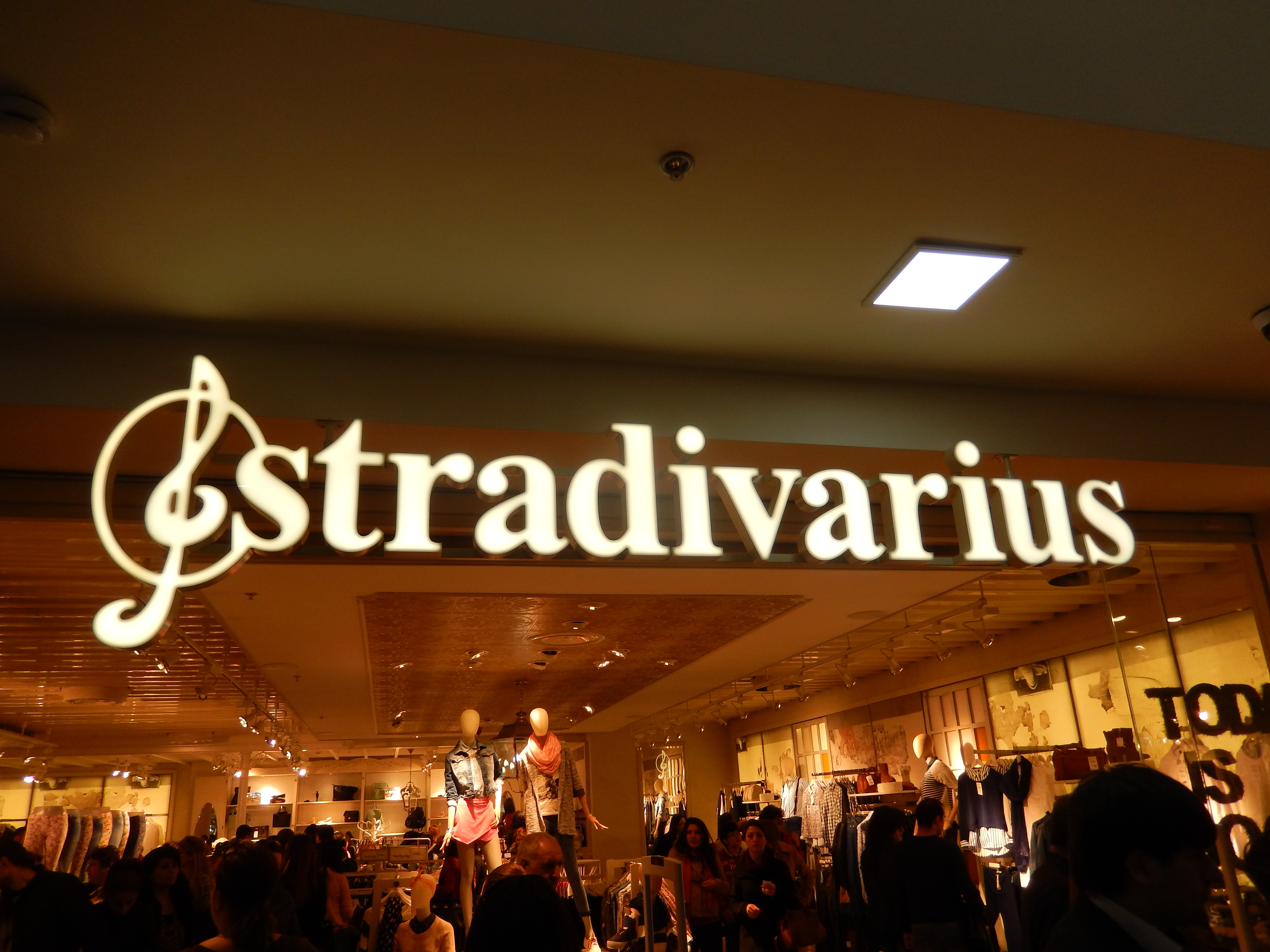
Stradivarius store in the mall

Yerevan Mall is home to a variety of retailers, including:

- Zara
- Stradivarius
- Mango
- Pull & Bear
- NewYorker
- Bershka
- Disney Store
- Kira Plastinina
- Carpisa
- Giordano
- Monsoon
- Accessorize
- F&F
- Okaïdi
- Levi's
- Celio
- Aldo
- Crocs
- OVS
- LC Waikiki
- Tape à l'oeil
- Jennyfer
- Julia & More
- Baldi
- KFC
- Goody's Burger House
- Black Star Burger
- Carrefour retailers

== See also ==
- Dalma Garden Mall
- Megamall Armenia
- Rossia Mall
