= Dalma Garden Mall =

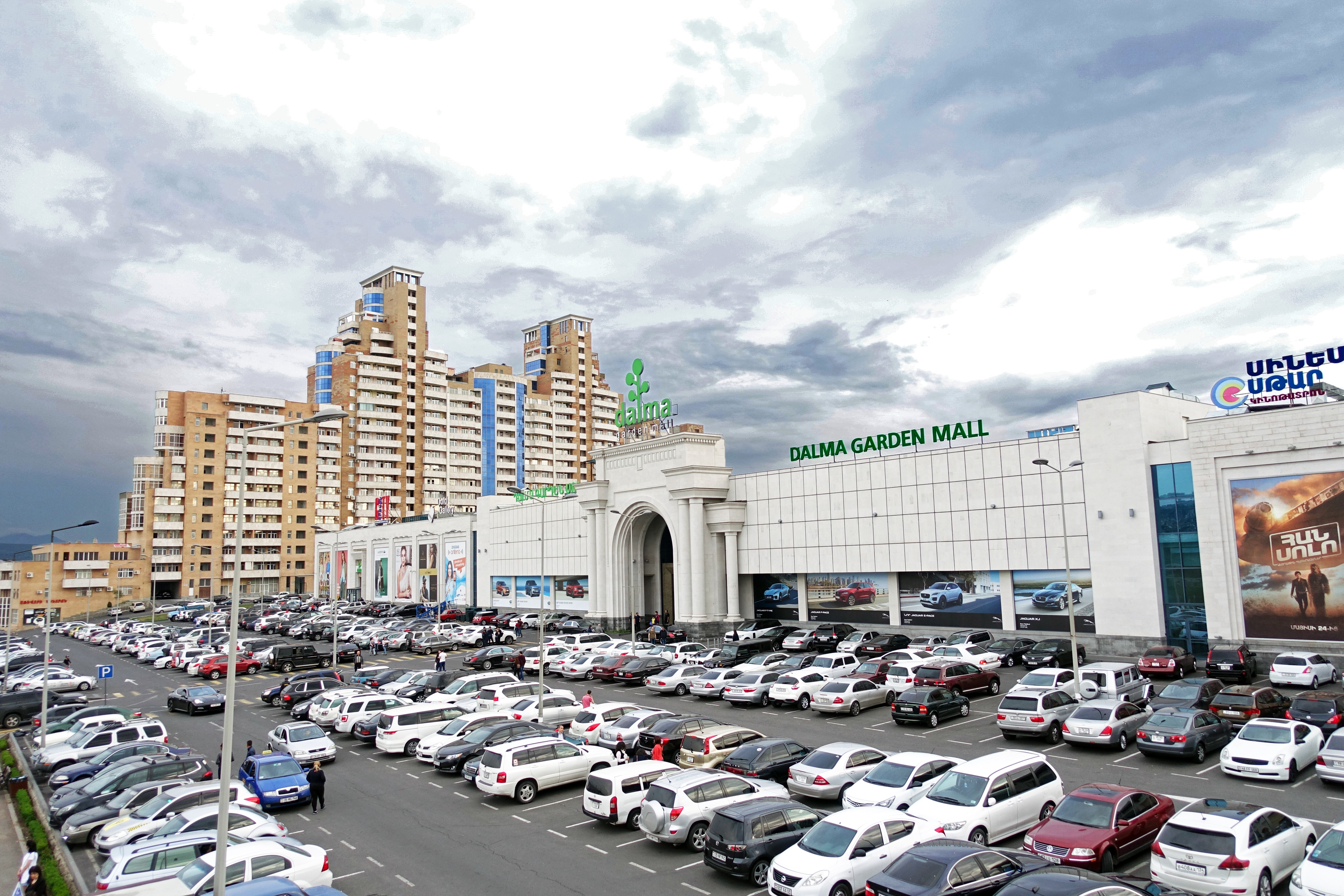
- Location: Malatia-Sebastia District; Yerevan, Armenia
- Coordinates: 40.179906°N 44.488531°E
- Address: Tsitsernakaberd Highway 3, Yerevan 0082
- Opened: October 2012
- Developer: Dalma Invest
- Owner: Tashir Group
- Num. of stores: 116
- Floor area: 43,500 square metres (468,000 sq ft)
- Floors: 3
- Parking: 500+
- Website: dalma.am

Dalma Garden Mall (Armenian: Դալմա Գարդեն Մոլ) is an Armenian enclosed shopping mall. It is located near the Tsitsernakaberd hill in the Armenian capital Yerevan. It was the first mall to open in Armenia.

== History ==
The project was announced in 2009 and the mall opened in October 2012. The mall was built by the "Tashir Group" led by Armenian-born Russian businessman Samvel Karapetyan. Former President Serzh Sargsyan attended the opening ceremony.

The mall also has a hypermarket/supermarket of the Armenian chain "Yerevan city".

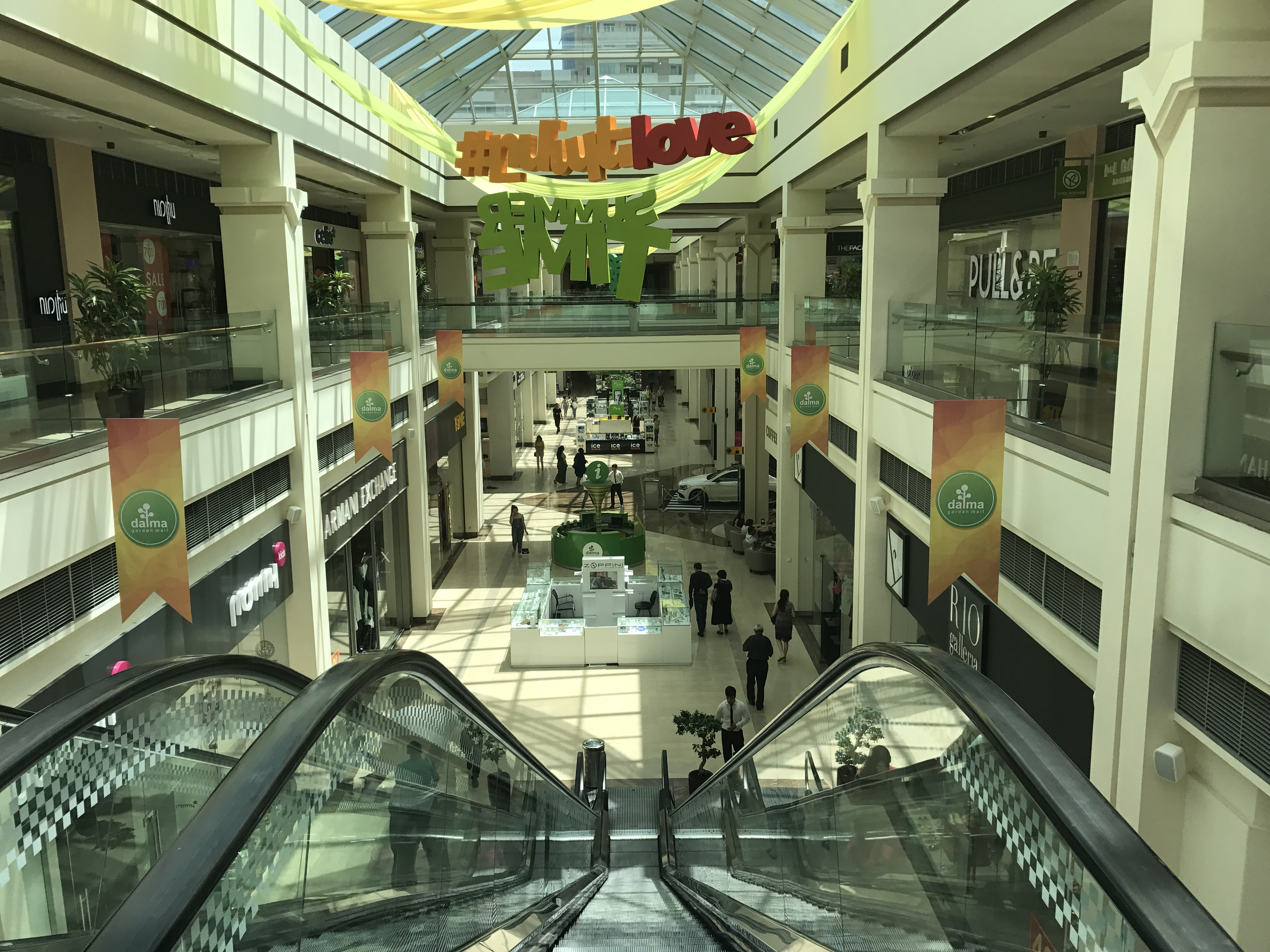
Dalma Garden Mall interior

== Stores ==
Some stores in the mall include:

- Armani Exchange, Ashley Furniture, Desigual, Levi Strauss & Co., LC Waikiki, L'Occitane en Provence, Marks & Spencer, MAC Cosmetics, Aldo, Cole Haan, Lacoste, Celio, Benetton, Zara, Swarovski, Stradivarius, Pandora, Mango, Massimo Dutti, Pull&Bear, The Body Shop, Jysk, Crocs, Bershka, Nike, Gant, Guess, and La Senza.

== Services ==
On 18 November 2013, the "Cinema Star" multiplex cinema theatre opened in the mall. "Cinema Star" is a Russian cinema chain that entered the Armenian market through its 6 halls in the Dalma Garden Mall. The multiplex is near Michael's café-restaurant.

== See also ==
- Megamall Armenia
- Rossia Mall
- Yerevan Mall
