= Aksa Energy =

Turkish energy company

- Type: Joint Stock Company
- Industry: Energy
- Founded: 1997; 29 years ago
- Headquarters: Istanbul, Turkey
- Revenue: ▼$1.21 billion (2023)
- Operating income: ▲$233.7 million (2023)
- Net income: ▲$210.5 million (2023)
- Total assets: ▲$1.92 billion (2023)
- Total equity: ▲$1.19 billion (2023)
- Owner: Kazancı Holding (%79.42)
- Number of employees: 17.000+ (2023)
- Website: https://www.aksaenerji.com.tr/en/home/

Aksa Energy, is a publicly traded energy company which was incorporated in 1997 and generates electricity. The main shareholder of Aksa Energy is Kazancı Holding. Cemil Kazancı is the board chairman and CEO of the company. Aksa Energy, having 13 power plant investments in 8 countries, carries out all power plant installation processes from project designing to procurement, construction and installation within its own organization.

Aksa Energy has constructed and operated more than 30 power plants by using various energy sources such as coal, fuel oil, biogas, natural gas, wind and hydroelectricity so far today.

In 2010, the share certificates of Aksa Energy were started to be traded on Borsa Istanbul with the code AKSEN. The share certificates of Aksa Energy are traded in the BIST 100, BIST Electricity, BIST Sustainability and BIST Corporate Governance Indices. Aksa Energy ranked 31st in the Fortune 500 survey for 2023 in which 500 largest companies of Turkey were included. The company ranked 38th in the Capital 500 survey for 2023. It is on the Global Coal Exit List compiled by the NGO Urgewald.

== History ==
- In 1997 Aksa Enerji Uretim A.S. was incorporated.
- In 2003 the Northern Cyprus Kalecik Fuel Oil Power Plant was commissioned.
- In 2008 Ali Metin Kazanci Antalya NGCCPP was commissioned.
- In 2010 Aksa Enerji Uretim A.S. was offered to public. • Sanliurfa NGCCPP started its commercial operation.
- In 2015 Bolu Goynuk Thermal Power Plant started its commercial operation. • Aksa Energy was included in the BIST Sustainability Index. • Aksa Energy performed its first bond issuance.
- In 2017 Ghana, Madagascar and Mali Fuel Oil Power Plants started commercial operation. • The rehabilitation and operation-maintenance agreement for the CTA-2 Fuel Oil Power Plant owned by Societe Jiro Sy Rano Malagasy (Jirama) in Madagascar was signed and the plant's capacity of 12 MW was commissioned in December, and it started its commercial operation
- In 2019 a preliminary memorandum of understanding was signed with the Ministry of Water Resources and Energy of Cameroon (MINEE) for the development of a power generation project in Cameroon, and a non-binding protocol was signed with Gaz du Cameroun S.A. for the natural gas procurement. • A preliminary license was obtained for two projects for the generation and sale of natural gas-based energy in the Republic of Congo.
- In 2020 an agreement was signed with the Ministry of Energy of Uzbekistan for the establishment of a natural gas combined cycle power plant with the installed capacity of 240 MW in Tashkent, the capital of the country, and the sale of the electricity generated at the plant for 25 years for a guaranteed capacity fee in USD.
- In 2021 a separate agreement was signed for the establishment of a second natural gas combined cycle power plant with the installed capacity of 230 MW in Tashkent, the capital of Uzbekistan, and a third natural gas combined cycle power plant with the installed capacity of 270 MW in Bukhara, and the initial test generation was performed at Tashkent A Power Plant with the installed capacity of 240 MW, which is the initial stage of the power plant investment. • A 30-year concession agreement was signed for the operating right of a natural gas power plant with the installed capacity of 50 MW in the Republic of Congo.
- In 2022 the commercial generation was started in Tashkent A, Tashkent B and Bukhara power plants, which are the largest Turkish energy investment in Uzbekistan. • The capacity tender for 240 MW Kizilorda Combined Thermal and Power Plant investment organized by the Ministry of Energy of Kazakhstan was won, and the investment works were started. • A 15-year electricity sales contract in USD was signed with the Republic of Ghana. • Electricity generated at Congo Natural Gas Power Plant started to be exported to the Democratic Republic of Congo.

== Board of directors ==
Cemil Kazancı	Chairman and CEO
Naci Ağbal	Vice Chairman
Serdar Nişli	Vice Chairman
Ömer Muzaffer Baktır	Board Member
Korkut Öztürkmen	Board Member
Ilhan Helvacı	Independent Board Member
Halit Haydar Yıldız	Independent Board Member
Ilkay Demirdağ	Independent Board Member

== Domestic power plants ==
- Antalya gas power plant: Started electricity generation in 2008, has a total installed capacity of 900 MW and an annual generation capacity of 7 billion KWh.
- Bolu Göynük power station: Has an installed capacity of 270 MW, is Turkey's first power plant, has a wet flue gas treatment system as well as fluidized bed boiler technology.
