= Halil Umut Meler =

Turkish football referee

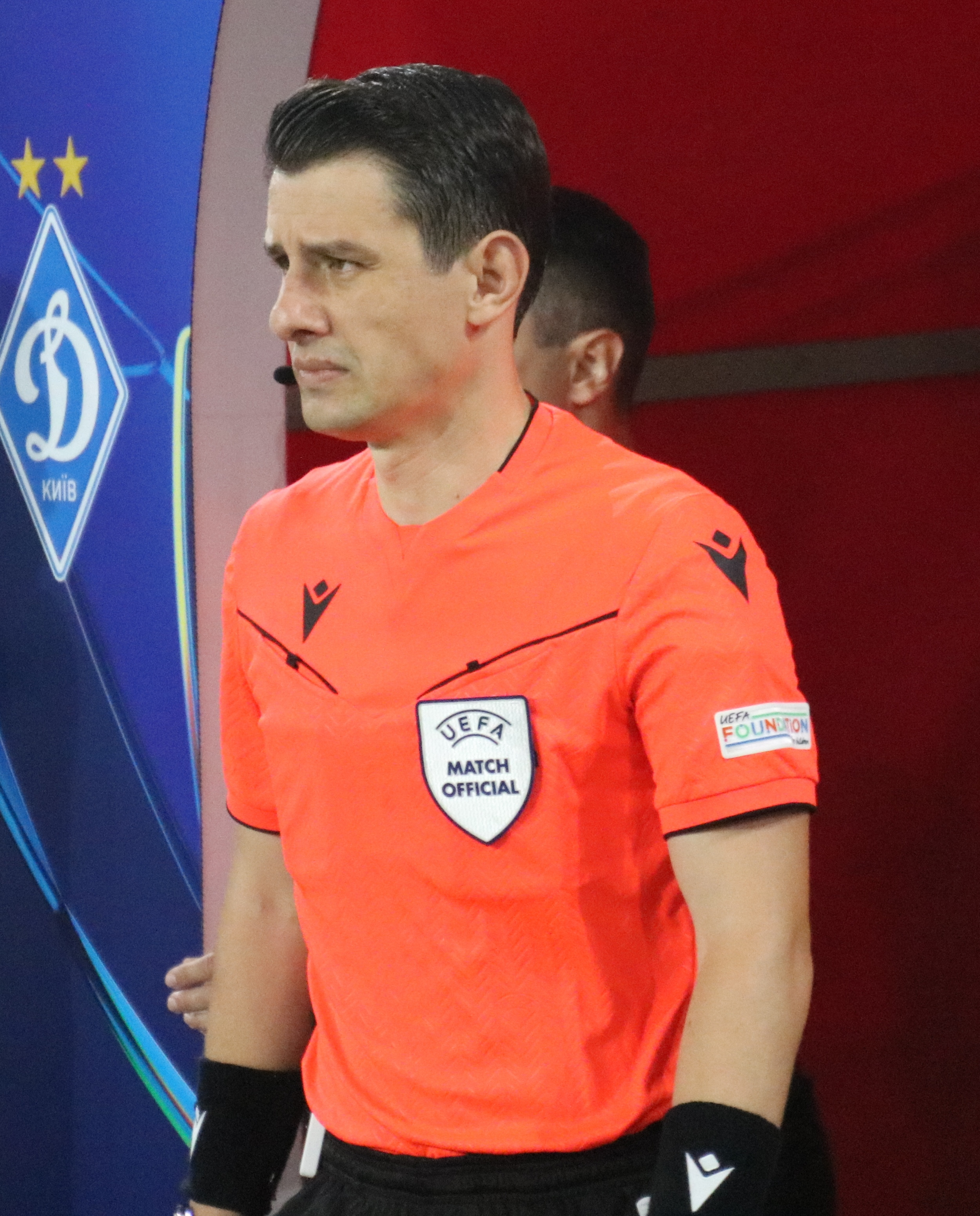
- Meler in 2024
- Full name: Halil Umut Meler
- Born: 1 August 1986 (age 40); İzmir, Turkey
- Other occupation: Management

Domestic
Years	League	Role
2013–2018	TFF Third League	Referee
2014–2017	TFF Second League	Referee
2014–present	TFF First League	Referee
2015–present	Süper Lig	Referee

International
Years	League	Role
2017–present	FIFA listed	Referee
2022–present	UEFA Elite	Referee

Halil Umut Meler (born 1 August 1986) is a Turkish football referee. He has been FIFA listed since 2017 and a member of the UEFA Elite since 2022. In December 2023, he was hospitalised after being attacked at the end of a Süper Lig match between MKE Ankaragücü and Çaykur Rizespor, an incident that led to a week-long suspension of all Turkish league football.

== Refereeing career ==
On 18 September 2015, Meler officiated in his first match in a top-flight league, a 2015–16 Süper Lig encounter between İstanbul Başakşehir and Akhisar Belediyespor match which ended 2–0.

Meler has been FIFA listed since 2017 and a member of the UEFA Elite since 2022. He officiated in the 2017–18 UEFA Europa League, beginning with the match between Vojvodina and Ružomberok on 29 June 2017, in which Vojvodina won the match 2–1.

Meler has also officiated in the finals of the 2018 UEFA European Under-17 Championship between Italy and Netherlands in which the Netherlands won 4–1 on penalties, and the 2019 Turkish Super Cup, in which Beşiktaş won 4–2 in penalties against Antalyaspor. On 9 December 2020, he officiated his first UEFA Champions League match, between Manchester City and Marseille, in which the English side won 3–0.

On 26 May 2022, Meler officiated the 2022 Turkish Cup final between Kayserispor and Sivasspor, final of the 60th edition of Turkey's primary football cup. Sivasspor won 3–2 on extra time to win their first Turkish Cup title.

In May 2023, he refereed the first leg of the 2022–23 UEFA Europa Conference League semi-finals between West Ham United and AZ Alkmaar.

In April 2024, he refereed the first leg of the 2023-24 UEFA Europa League quarter-finals between Liverpool and Atalanta. In same month, Meler was selected to officiate at UEFA Euro 2024 in Germany.

=== December 2023 attack ===
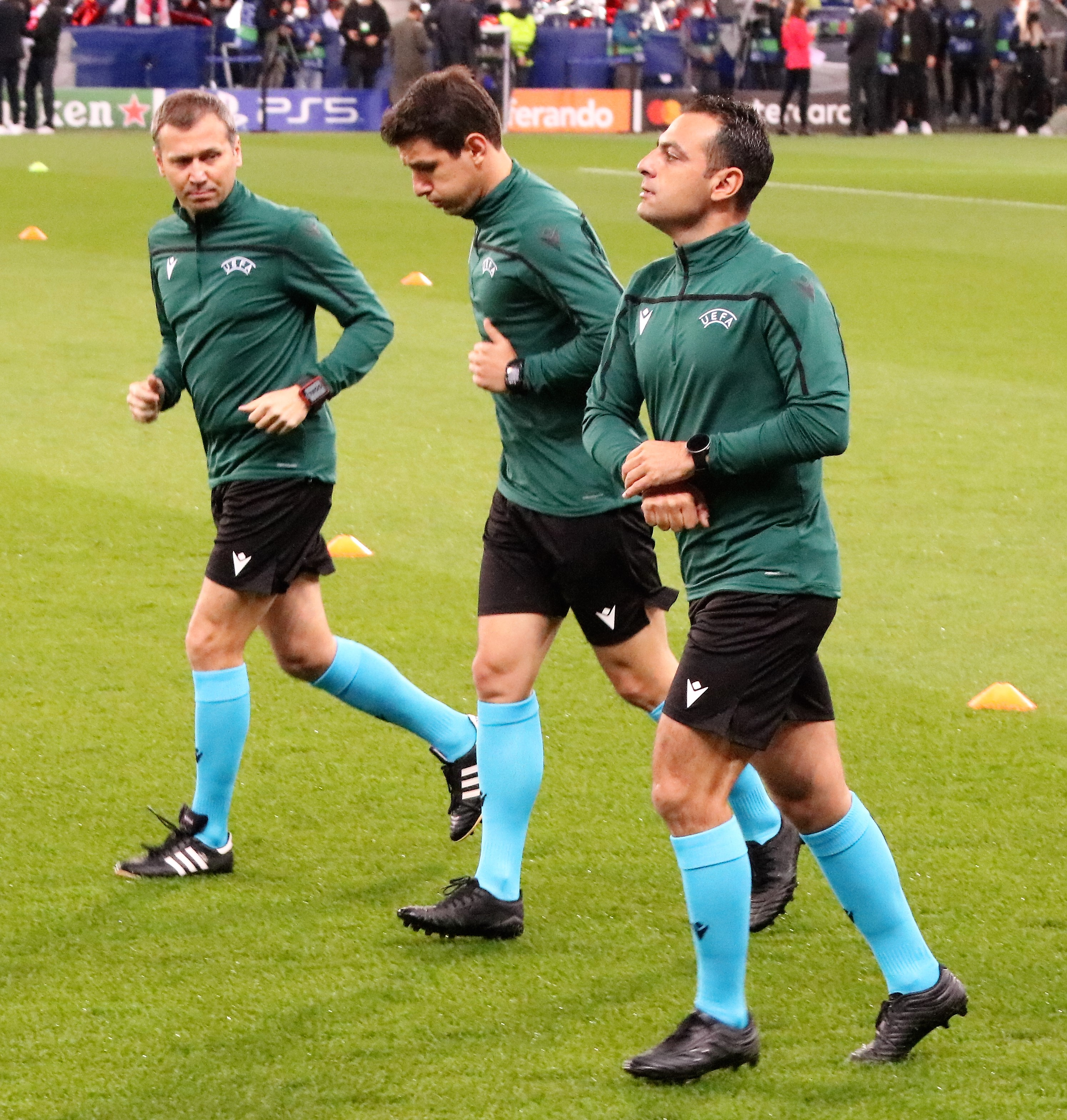
Meler warming up for the match with his colleagues

On 11 December 2023, after officiating in the MKE Ankaragücü and Çaykur Rizespor Süper Lig match which ended 1–1, Meler was attacked by MKE Ankaragücü president Faruk Koca, also being kicked by two other men while on the ground. The assistant officials tried to stop the attack from escalating even further. Meler was then taken into a security circle by the security forces. It was determined that Meler's left eye was swollen and the first medical intervention was performed on the pitch. After the medical intervention, Meler and his assistants were taken to the dressing room accompanied by police teams. Meler was taken out of the stadium, accompanied by security forces and was taken to hospital by ambulance. Ankaragücü fans supported the attack. Meler was followed up throughout the night by hospital authorities due to a head injury.

Meler was visited in hospital by Turkey's interior minister Ali Yerlikaya, and received a telephone call from Turkey's President Erdogan. According to Turkish sports channel A Spor, Meler allegedly told visiting colleagues: "This job is over for me. I cannot continue anymore." Meler, who was expected to remain in hospital for a second night, was reported by medical staff to have sustained a facial fracture and a bleeding to his eye but that there should be no permanent damage.

The Turkish Football Federation (TFF) convened an emergency meeting after the incident; the Süper Lig was subsequently indefinitely suspended.

Ankara Western Chief Public Prosecutor's Office started an investigation into the incident and issued a detention warrant for Koca and two other people. All three were arrested for taking part in the incident and sent to Sincan Prison. Three people were released on judicial control conditions.

In his statement to investigators, Koca said the incident was sparked by the referee’s "wrong decisions" and "provocative behaviour". In addition, Koca stated that he approached the referee with the intention of "spitting in his face" rather than attacking him. Koca also said: "The slap I threw will not cause fractures. After the slap I gave, the referee stood for about 5–10 seconds and then threw himself on the ground. They immediately removed me from the scene because I had heart disease. I am not aware of any events that took place other than this. That's all I have to say", Meler, meanwhile, said he fell to the ground after Koca hit him under his left eye and threatened to kill him. Koca allegedly told Meler and his assistants: "I will finish you. I will kill you." Following the attack, former Ankaragücü coach Hikmet Karaman claimed he had also been assaulted by Koca.

A day after the incident, Koca apologized to Meler and his family in a press statement in which he also announced his resignation as the Ankaragücü club president. Ankaragücü's vice president Zeynep Karamancı and board members of the club Mehmet Şahin and Erkan Aytekin went to visit Meler in hospital, but Meler refused to meet with them.

Meler was discharged from the hospital on the morning of 13 December 2023. On the same day, in a press conference held in Istanbul, TFF president Mehmet Büyükekşi denied all allegations of Meler quitting refereeing due to the attack. In the same press conference, Büyükekşi said the Turkish football leagues would resume on 19 December 2023, ending a week-long suspension following the attack.

On 14 December 2023, the TFF announced that Koca had been banned permanently for punching Meler. Ankaragücü were fined two million lira (£54,000) and ordered to play five home games without any fans.

On 20 December 2023, Meler stated that MKE Ankaragücü coach Emre Belözoğlu had provoked the attack and claimed that he had a grudge against him from the past.

On 27 December 2023, Koca was released on bail following his lawyer's objection being accepted. Although Koca appeared in front of the judge on 9 January 2024, Koca's trial without arrest, which was supposed to take place on the same day on charges of injuring a public official, threatening an official and violating a law relating to the prevention of violence in sports was adjourned to 28 February 2024. Koca also denied the allegations in the lawsuit regarding the incident.

On 14 January 2024, it was announced that he would continue refereeing with him being determined as the main referee for the Konyaspor–İstanbulspor 2023-24 Süper Lig match the same day. On 11 November, Koca was convicted and sentenced to 3.5 years' imprisonment for assaulting Meler.

==== Reactions ====
President of Turkey Recep Tayyip Erdoğan, Minister of the Interior Ali Yerlikaya, Vice President Cevdet Yılmaz, AKP Spokesperson Ömer Çelik, Speaker of the Grand National Assembly of Turkey Numan Kurtulmuş, TBMM AKP Group Chairman Abdullah Güler, CHP Chairman Özgür Özel, İYİ Party Chairman Meral Akşener, Homeland Party Chairman Muharrem İnce, Future Party Chairman Ahmet Davutoğlu condemned the attack on Meler. FIFA president Gianni Infantino also condemned the attack, calling it "totally unacceptable," and adding "without match officials there is no football".

The Turkish Association of Active Football Referees and Observers called on referees not to attend matches.

On 12 December 2023, referees of the Süper Lig visited Meler at the hospital where he was being treated at. After the visit, Arda Kardeşler and Mete Kalkavan made a press statement, in which they condemned the attack.

Former referee Ahmet Çakar reacted to the attacker Faruk Koca and two unknown people by stating that he wanted to see them in handcuffs and referring to them as godless people, also stating that he wanted the attackers to tell about their relationship with Iran.

Journalist Fatih Altaylı reacted to the attack with the words "If a 'Fair Play award' is given to the club president because he is a former MP and founder of AKP, that award will come back in the form of a punch".

== Personal life ==
Meler is married and has one child. He lives in Selçuk, İzmir along with his wife and child. The couple had announced the birth of their first child 10 days before the Ankaragücü incident.

== Statistics in the Süper Lig ==
Season	Games	Total pen. given	Total (yellow card)	Total (red card)
2015–16	9	2	46	2
2016–17	22	11	119	5
2017–18	21	4	101	7
2018–19	20	12	92	5
2019–20	20	12	110	11
2020–21	22	12	111	8
2021–22	25	11	110	7
2022–23	14	6	74	6
2023–24	8	3	50	4

As of 12 December 2023

== See also ==
- List of football referees
