= Mapa Group =

Turkish conglomerate

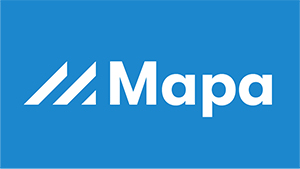
- Company type: Private
- Industry: Conglomerate
- Founded: 1976
- Founder: Mehmet Nazif Günal
- Headquarters: Istanbul, Turkey
- Key people: Murathan Doruk Günal (CEO)
- Number of employees: 20,000

Mapa Group is a Turkish conglomerate owned by its founder, Mehmet Nazif Günal. They were formerly named MNG Group of Companies (Turkish: MNG Şirketler Grubu) and MNG Şirketler Grubu Holding A.Ş. is the holding company of the group.

== History ==
Günal Construction, the first company in the group, was founded in 1976 by Mehmet Nazif Günal, followed by Mapa Construction in 1978. The companies became a joint stock company in 1983. The first large-scale construction projects the company undertook were the Afşin Elbistan Power Plant, completed in 1982, the Kralkızı Dam in 1984, and the Hilton Izmir, which was constructed in 1992.

In 1996 the company expanded its operations into air cargo, and created MNG Airlines, followed by an expansion into tourism in 1999. In 2013, the company won the tender to construct the new Istanbul Airport, and in 2014 MNG finished construction on the Heydar Aliyev International Airport in Azerbaijan. In 2000, MNG finished construction a recreation of the Topkapı Palace as a beach resort in Antalya, followed by the Kremlin Palace Hotel, a reconstruction of St. Basil's Cathedral and the Moscow Kremlin on the Antalya beachfront, which was completed in 2003. The MNG Media Group launched TV8 in 1999, which was sold to Acun Ilıcalı and the Doğuş Group in 2013.

MNG's equity securities brokerage arm MNG Securities was purchased by Lehman Brothers in 2007.

Mapa Construction completed a new terminal at Accra International Airport in Ghana in 2018, and has been constructing the Stade Abdelkader Khalef stadium in Tizi Ouzou, Algeria.

In 2020, MNG Group of Companies changed their name to Mapa Group.

== Controversies ==
In 2015, Turkish media alleged that the MRG's sale of TV8 was at the request of Turkish president Recep Tayyip Erdoğan. The MNG Group has received controversy due to environmental concerns around hydroelectric dams, and the construction of Istanbul Airport, which involved the removal of 660,000 trees.

On September 27, 2017, MNG Gold Liberia Inc., a subsidiary of UK-based Avesoro Holdings Ltd, experienced a catastrophic failure at its Tailing Storage Facility at the Kokoya mine in Bong County, Liberia, resulting in the release of approximately 3 million gallons of toxic chemicals including cyanide, mercury, and lead into the environment. According to a report to the Liberian Senate from the National Bureau of Concessions of Liberia, the spill posed significant dangers to the local community, flora, and fauna, with the toxic substances expected to remain in the environment for decades to come.

In August 2019, a security guard for Avesoro Resources, a member of MNG, killed a man illegally panning for gold at the Youga Gold Mine in Burkina Faso. The death led to locals rioting and attacking the mining facilities in retaliation the next day. Over 500 people at the mine had lost their jobs in 2019, and had been replaced by Turkish contractors.

An employee at Turkish private jet operator MNG Jet admitted to falsifying passenger records around the escape of Nissan executive Carlos Ghosn from Japan in December 2019, which used the company's planes. MNG filed a criminal complaint against the employee in January 2020, noting the two flights involved in his escape did not appear to be for the same client. On 8 May, Turkey charged seven people accused of helping Ghosn flee to Lebanon via Istanbul.

== Companies ==
=== Construction ===
- Günal Construction
- Mapa Construction
- MNG Esmaş
- MNG Tesisat
- MNG Targem
- MNG Zemtaş

=== Tourism ===
- MNG Turizm
- MNG Bilet
- MNG Mice
- WOW Hotels

=== Air transportation ===
- MNG Airlines
- MNG Jet

=== Finance ===
- MNG Faktoring
- MNG Investment

=== Mining ===
- Avesoro Resources
