= Rossia Mall =

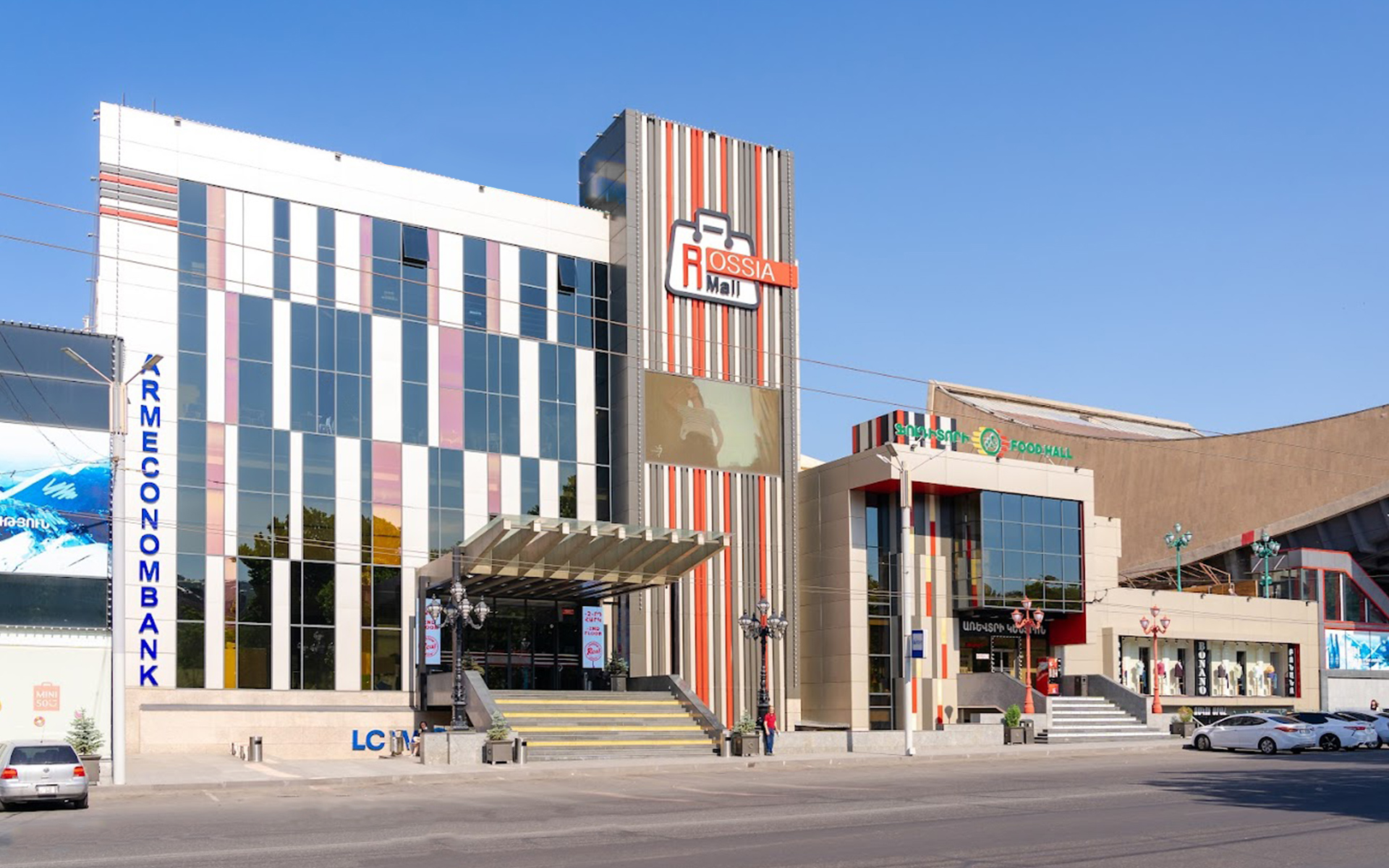
- Main entrance to the mall
- Location: Kentron, Yerevan, Armenia
- Coordinates: 40°10′18″N 44°30′46″E
- Address: 16 Tigran Mets Avenue
- Opened: 5 March 2016
- Owner: "Sil Capital" LLC
- Floor area: 20,000 square metres (220,000 sq ft)
- Floors: 7
- Website: rossiamall.am

Rossia Mall is an enclosed shopping mall located on Tigran Mets Avenue in the Armenian capital Yerevan. The shopping center was opened on 5 March 2016, with the presence of former Armenian president Serzh Sargsyan. The mall has direct access to the General Andranik metro station, adjacent to the Rossia Theatre.

Rossia Mall operates under the management of "Sil Capital" LLC, which was founded in 2012 by the Sukiasyan family and was aimed at offering capital investment and strategic support to Armenian enterprises.

== Entertainment ==
The mall has a number of cafes and restaurants as well as a food court. It is also home to the "Play Space" children's playground.

== Stores ==
- Terranova
- LC Waikiki
- Uno Shoes
- Kari
- OVS
- Miniso
- Carrefour
- Real Store
- VLV centre
- Zarina
- Ankasa
- Bookinist
- Mary Parfume
- Mobile Centre
- Karkatan
- Black Style
- Vernissage

== See also ==
- Dalma Garden Mall
- Megamall Armenia
- Yerevan Mall
