= Nihat Özdemir =

Turkish businessman and former president of the Turkish Football Federation (born 1950)

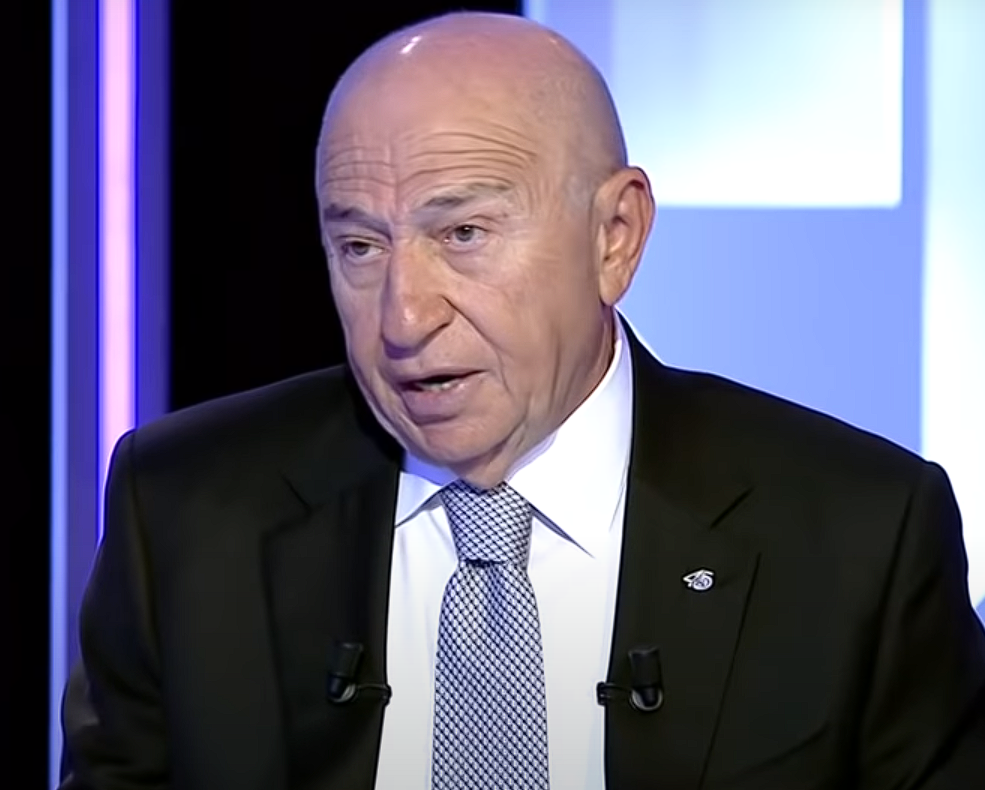

President of the Turkish Football Federation
- In office 1 June 2019 – 4 April 2022
- Preceded by: Hüsnü Güreli (interim)
- Succeeded by: Servet Yardımcı (interim)

Personal details
- Born: 5 April 1950 (age 76) Diyarbakır, Turkey
- Children: 2
- Education: Gazi University
- Occupation: Founder & Director, Limak Holding

Nihat Özdemir (born 5 April 1950) is a Turkish business man, owner of Limak holding and former president of the Turkish Football Federation. He was the Deputy President and Press Spokesman for Turkish Süper Lig football club Fenerbahçe SK.

Limak Holding was launched in 1976 by Özdemir and Sezai Bacaksız, with Özdemir focussing on cement and energy while Bacaksız focussed on airports and tourism. In 2011, Özdemir and Bacaksız were listed as billionaires by Forbes.

== Early life and education ==
Özdemir was born in Diyarbakır on 5 April 1950 to a family originally from Bitlis. He has publicly stated that he is Kurdish.

He moved to Ankara in 1967 to study engineering and graduated as a mechanical engineer from the Ankara State Academy of Engineering and Architecture (now part of Gazi University). He later earned a master's degree in industrial engineering at Ege University in 1975.

== See also ==
- List of Turks by net worth

Honorary titles
| Preceded by Yıldırım Demirören | President of the Turkish Football Federation; 2019–2022 | Succeeded by Servet Yardımcı (interim) |
