= Mustafa Küçük =

Turkish businessman

- Born: 1963 (age 62–63); Malatya, Turkey
- Education: Selçuk University (BS; Istanbul Technical University (MS)
- Occupation: CEO of LC Waikiki
- Children: 3

Mustafa Küçük is a Turkish businessman and a US dollar billionaire as of 2016.

== Biography ==
Küçük was born in Malatya in 1963 to a poor family. He was one of two people from his district to attend university. In 1987, he started his own textile business in the basement of an apartment building, later growing the business and expanding into embroidery, printing and dyeing. In 2000, Küçük became the CEO of the Tema Group.

Küçük became the largest shareholder of fashion brand LC Waikiki in 1997. The brand began expanding into international markets in 2009, first opening stores in Romania, and now operates in 33 countries. In 2016, LC Waikiki expanded into textile products, under the name LCW Home.

== See also ==
- List of Turkish billionaires by net worth
