= Şefik Yılmaz Dizdar =

- Born: 1939 (age 86–87)
- Education: İzmir Economy and Commerce Academy
- Occupation: Businessman
- Known for: Co-owner of LC Waikiki

Şefik Yılmaz Dizdar (born 1939) is a Turkish billionaire businessman, one of the owners of LC Waikiki, a Turkish producer and retailer of clothing and homewares, with 700 stores in 34 countries, and annual sales of over $2 billion.

His brother Vahap Küçük, is the CEO and spokesman of LC Waikiki.

Dizdar is married, and lives in Istanbul, Turkey.
