= Solinair =

Slovenian airline

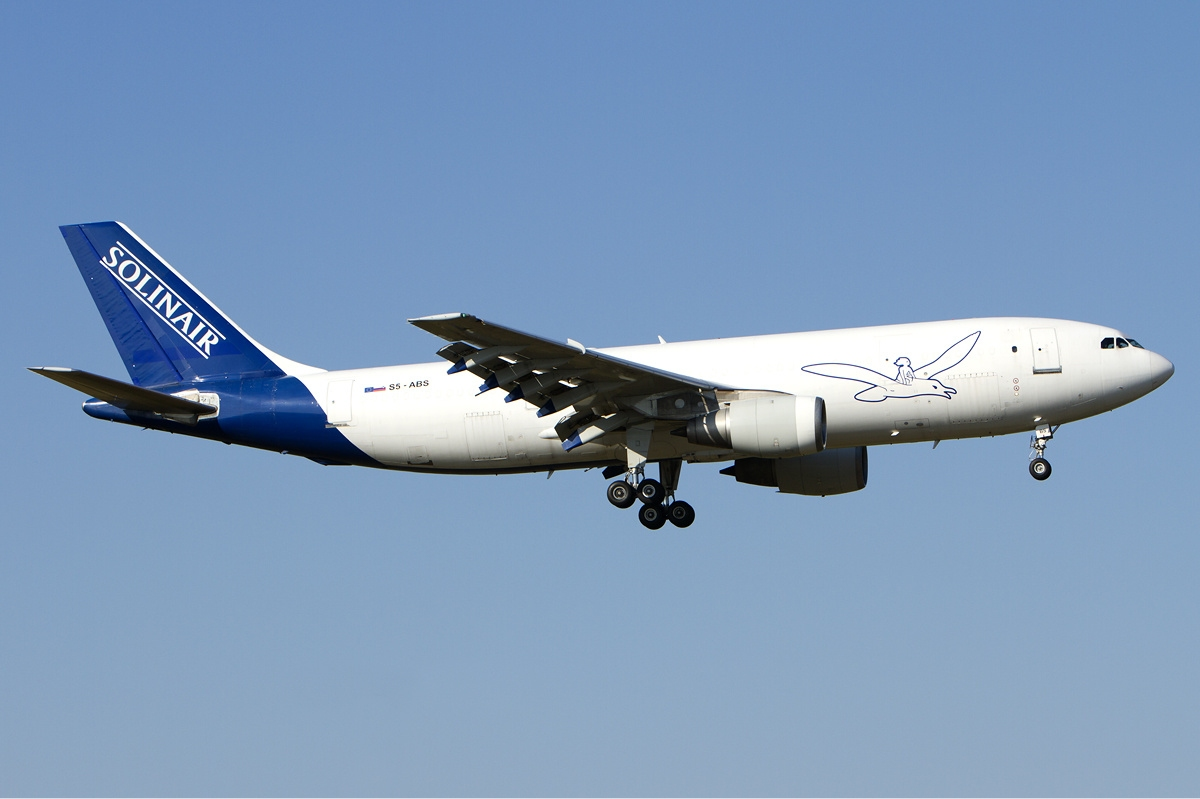
- Solinair A300B4-200
IATA	ICAO	Call sign
ZS	SOP	SOLINAIR
- Founded: 1991; 35 years ago
- Hubs: Leipzig/Halle Airport
- Fleet size: 2
- Parent company: MNG Airlines
- Headquarters: Ljubljana, Slovenia
- Key people: Matej Tomšič, Rok Škerjanc
- Website: solinair.si

Solinair d.o.o. is a Slovenian airline based at Ljubljana Jože Pučnik Airport. It mainly operates charter cargo and passenger services for various logistics companies such as DHL and also offers aircraft maintenance.

== History ==
The airline was founded in 1991 by two pilots and two business entrepreneurs, commencing operations with a PT6-powered Let L410 UVP under contract with DHL. It was the first privately owned airline established in Slovenia and the first in the former Yugoslav republics.

The company operated through three core business divisions: airline operations, a Flight Training Organisation (FTO, later ATO), and a Part 145 maintenance organisation. Airline operations were conducted with two Let L410 UVPE aircraft (S5-BAE and S5-BAF), primarily serving DHL cargo operations, with occasional passenger charter flights. The FTO provided both fixed wing and helicopter flight training, while the Part 145 organisation specialised in general aviation maintenance and L410 line maintenance.

The company's first Chief Executive Officer was Capt. Stanislav Potočnik, who was also one of its shareholders. In 2005, he was succeeded by Klemen Mark Kete. In 2008, the airline was acquired by Turkish MNG Airlines. The flight training organisation was not included in the transaction and continued operations separately under the Lippizanair AOC.

Following the acquisition, Solinair initially operated one Airbus A300 freighter registered in Slovenia. The fleet was subsequently expanded to include Boeing 737-400F aircraft. In July 2015, the company withdrew its entire fleet from service. The Saab 340 was returned to its lessor, while the two Boeing 737-400F aircraft were sold. Since September 2015, Solinair has been operating Airbus A300-600RF aircraft.

== Destinations ==
Solinair operates ad-hoc cargo charter flights on behalf of other airlines and logistics companies as well as ACMI services.

== Fleet ==
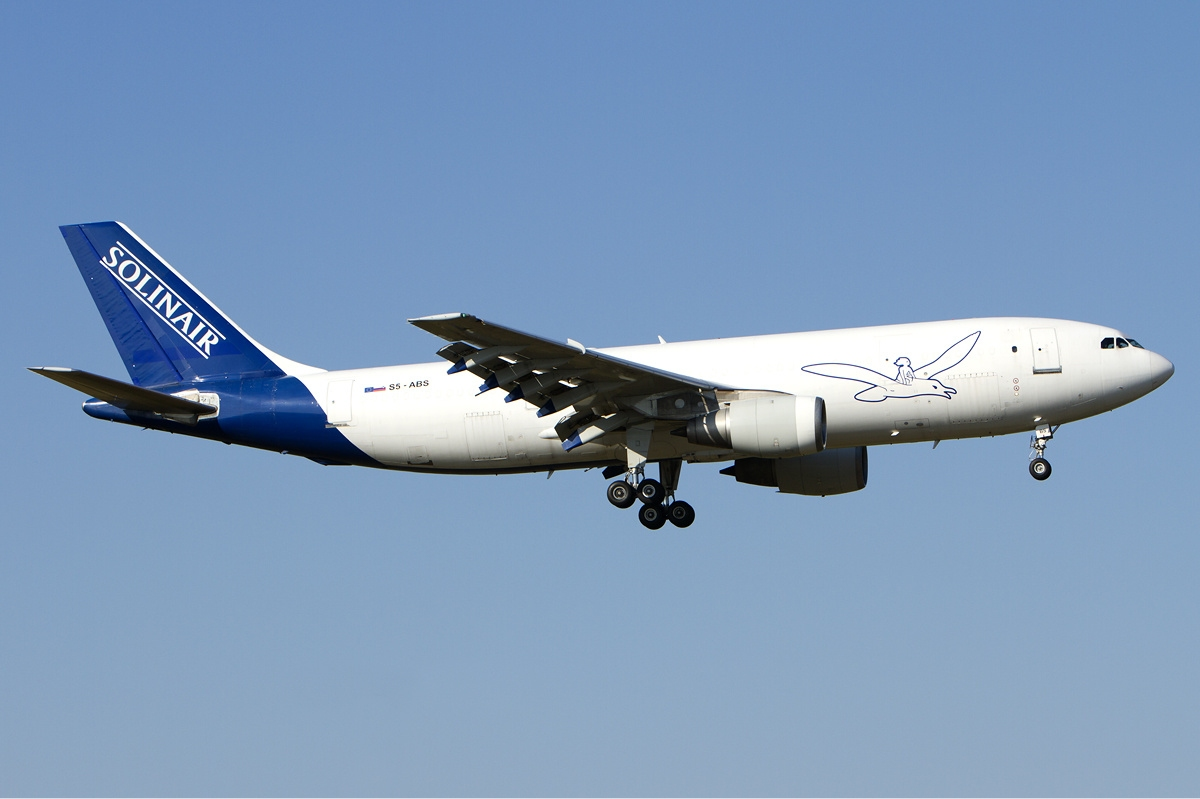
Former Solinair Airbus A300B4-200F

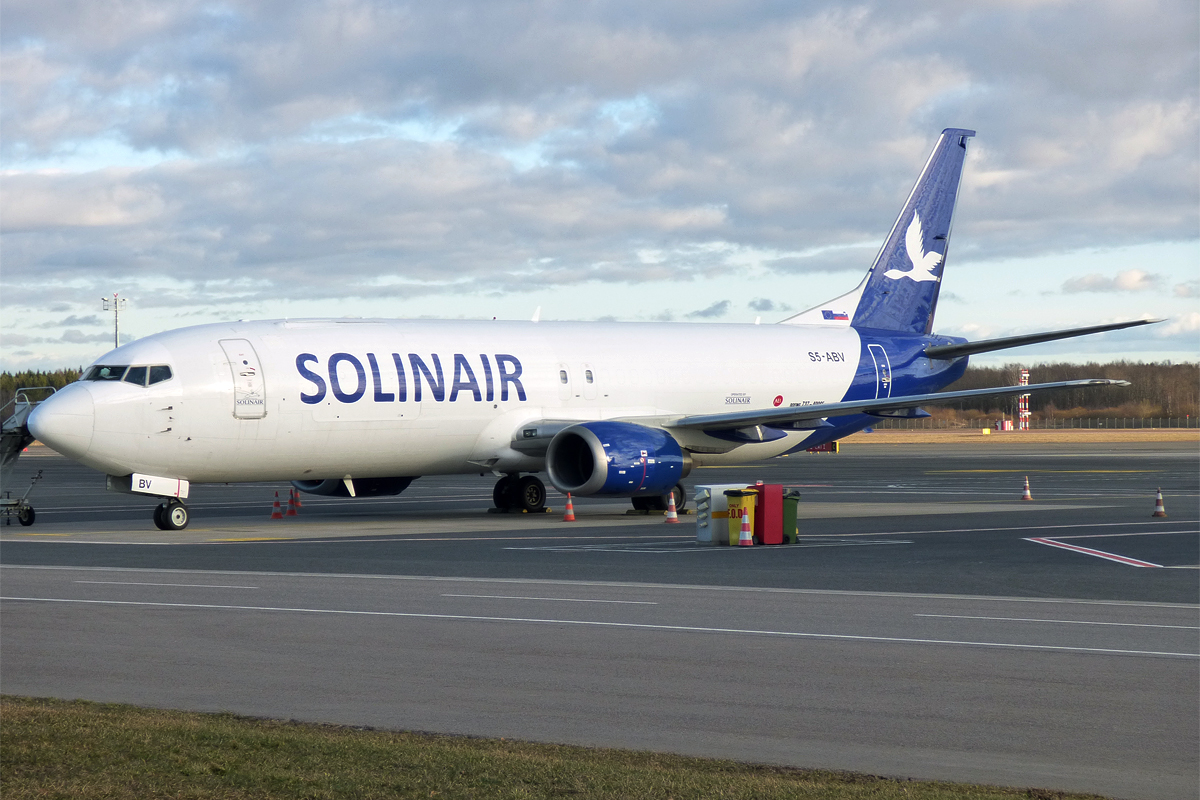
Former Solinair Boeing 737-400F

=== Current fleet ===
As of August 2025, Solinair operates the following aircraft:

Solinair fleet
Aircraft	In service	Orders	Notes
Airbus A300-600RF	2	—	
Total	2	—	

=== Historic fleet ===
Solinair also used to operate the following aircraft types:

- Boeing 737-400F
- Let L-410 Turbolet
- Saab 340F
