= Kazancı Holding =

Holding company based in Turkey

- Type: Holding
- Industry: Energy, agriculture, tourism
- Founded: 1994
- Founder: Ali Metin Kazancı
- Headquarters: Istanbul, Turkey
- Key people: Cemil Kazancı (chairperson)
- Revenue: ▲US$5.03 billion (2022)
- Operating income: ▲US$621 million (2022)
- Net income: ▲US$306 million (2022)
- Total assets: ▲US$3.37 billion (2022)
- Total equity: ▲US$893 million (2022)
- Number of employees: 18,000
- Website: kazanciholding.com.tr

Kazancı Holding is a holding company based in Turkey. It was founded in the 1950s, is one of the energy groups of Turkey. In addition to the energy sector, the group companies, which also operate in the fields of agriculture and tourism, were merged under the umbrella of Kazancı Holding in 1994. The Chair of the Board of Directors of the Holding, having its headquarter in Kavacık, Beykoz, is Cemil Kazancı.

Kazancı Holding entered the energy sector in 1968 with the Watt Electric Motor Factory. The holding started to manufacture generators in the 1980s, and added the power plant commissioning and electricity generation in the 1990s, natural gas distribution in the early 2000s, and electricity distribution and sales in 2010 to its fields of activity. The group continues its investments and operations also in the fields of agriculture and tourism in addition to energy.

In the Fortune 500 survey for 2023, which includes 500 largest companies of Turkey, Aksa Energy ranked 31st, Aksa Natural Gas 39th, Aksa Electricity 130th, Aksa Çoruh Retail Electricity Sales 194th, Aksa Fırat Retail Electricity Sales 247th, and Aksa Power Generation 213th, all of which are the affiliates of Kazancı Holding.

In the Capital 500 survey for 2023, Aksa Energy ranked 38th, Aksa Natural Gas 46th, Aksa Electricity 155th, Aksa Çoruh Retail Electricity Sales 238th, Aksa Power Generation 263rd and Aksa Fırat Retail Electricity Sales 310th. As of 2023, Kazancı Holding makes production with its more than 10,000 employees in four continents. The holding, making sales to 178 countries, operates in 25 countries.

Aksa Energy, generating electricity with more than 2,700 MW installed capacity across the globe and has power plant investments in Turkey, Northern Cyprus, Ghana, Mali, Madagascar, Congo, Uzbekistan as well as Kazakhstan as of 2023. Aksa Power Generation, which has production facilities in Turkey, the United States and China and trade centres in the Netherlands and the United Arab Emirates, has overseas offices in 25 countries. The company also makes sales to 178 countries. Kazancı Holding companies operate in the fields of energy, agriculture and tourism. It owns various power stations via Aksa Energy, such as Bolu Göynük coal-fired power station. Because of its coal-fired power stations in Turkey subsidiary Aksa Energy is on the Urgewald Global Coal Exit List. The Africa Centre for Energy Policy has criticised the Ghanaian government for paying for the renovation of gas-fired power plants to extend their lifespan.

== Companies ==
=== Sports ===
- Kasımpaşa S.K.

=== Energy ===
- Aksa Energy
- Aksa Natural Gas
- Aksa Electricity
- Aksa Power Generation
- Aksa Battery
- Aksa Solar
- Aksa Çoruh Retail Electricity Sales Company
- Aksa Fırat Retail Electricity Sales Company

=== Agriculture ===
- Aksa Agriculture

=== Tourism ===
- Mirada Exclusive Bodrum
- Mirada Del Mar
- Mirada Del Lago
- Mirada Del Monte
