= Ahmet Çalık =

Turkish billionaire businessman (born 1958)

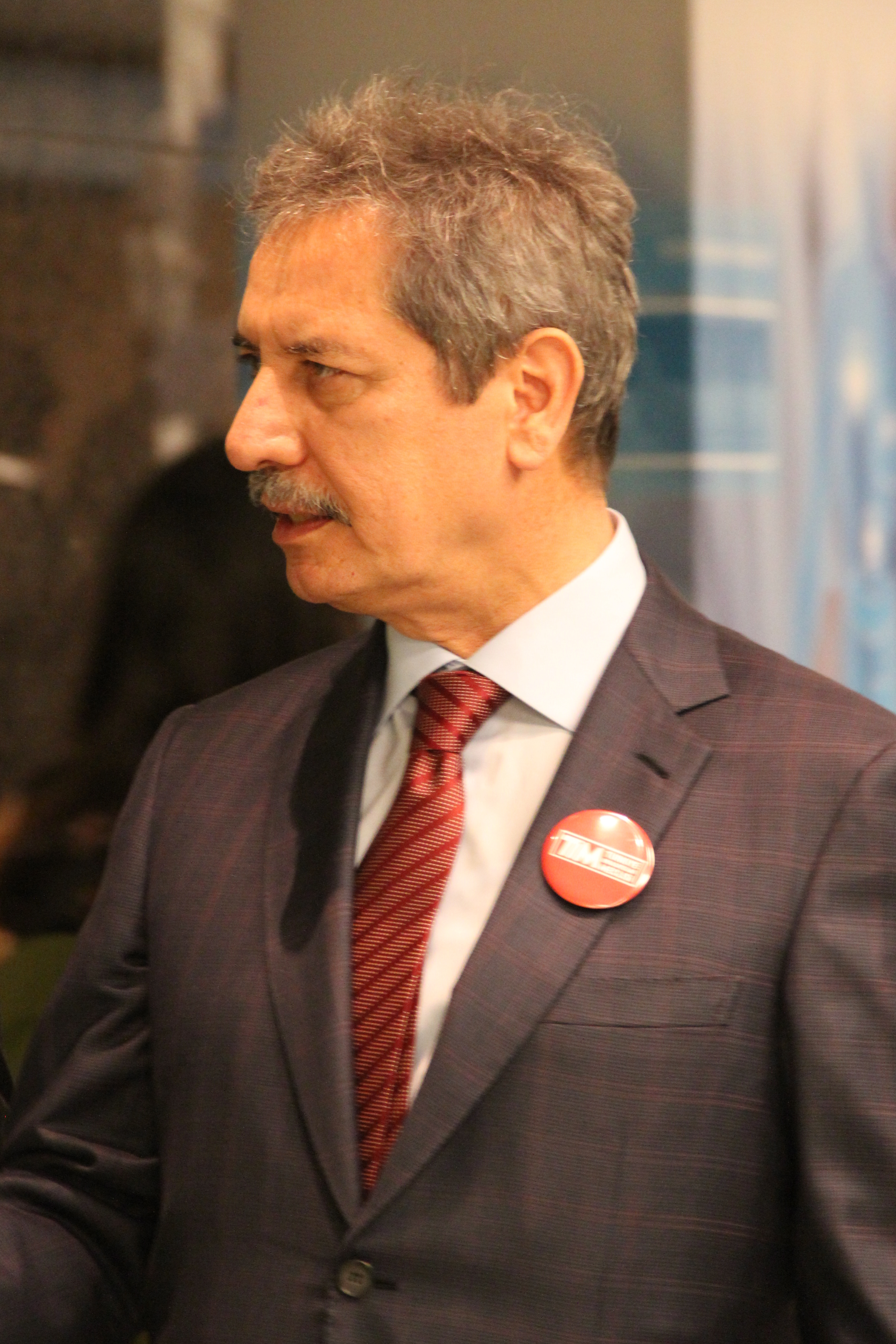
- Çalık in 2016

chairman of the board of Çalık Holding
- Incumbent
- Assumed office 1997
- Deputy: Mehmet Ertuğrul Gürler

Representative of the President of Turkmenistan on the sale of natural gas, oil and electricity in the markets of Turkey
- In office 1997–2004
- President: Saparmurat Niyazov
- Preceded by: Office established
- Succeeded by: Office abolished

Personal details
- Born: 1 March 1958 (age 68) Malatya, Turkey

Ahmet Çalık (born 1 March 1958) is a Turkish billionaire businessman who is the chairman of Çalık Holding. As of September 2024, Forbes estimated his net worth at US$1.5 billion.

== Business ==
Çalık established Ortadogu Tekstil in 1981. He made his first investment in eastern Anatolia by establishing Çalık Denim in Malatya. He united the group companies operating in the fields of energy, construction, mining, textile and finance under one roof by establishing Çalık Holding in 1997.

== Events and Controversies ==
He comes to the agenda with issues such as the mine disaster in which people died and the non-payment of workers. Çalık Holding, whose name was also mentioned in the Paradise Papers, Ahmet Çalık was among the leaks about off-shore companies. The published Pandora Papers included four companies that Çalık Holding is related to. It was revealed that Ahmet Çalık managed the activities of other companies from behind the scenes thanks to these off-shore companies.

=== Iliç Mine Accident ===
The disaster occurred on February 13, 2024 after the cyanide leaching process at the Anagold mine in the İliç district of Erzincan. The Anagold is a joint venture between the US and Canadian Anagold Mining and Çalık Holding, owned by Ahmet Çalık. Hakkı Akil, chief advisor to Çalık Holding Chairman Ahmet Çalık, said of the disaster, "Why can't they do it? They have mines all over the world, they are doing it. We are only a financial investor." CHP Chairman Özgür Özel said to Ahmet Çalık, the owner of Çalık Holding, one of those responsible for the mine disaster in İliç, where 9 workers were buried under the soil, "If you get a share of the profit, you are responsible for everything that happens there. Those who are trying to get away with it now, those who exploit it at the expense of the lives of the nation cannot escape responsibility. That mine must be closed immediately."

=== Paradise Papers and Pandora Papers Off-Shore Accounts ===
Çalık Holding, owned by Ahmet Çalık, has offshore companies with millions of dollars in accounts in the British Virgin Islands. In the documents disclosed by the International Consortium of Investigative Journalists (ICIJ), it was stated that Çalık Holding, whose activities in tax havens were previously exposed with the Paradise Papers leaks, used shell companies with millions of dollars in their accounts for Çalık Holding's commercial transactions, according to the newly leaked documents. Istanbul 21st Civil Court of First Instance rejected the lawsuit filed by Ahmet Çalık against journalists Pelin Ünker and Orhan Erinç due to the Paradise Papers article series, finding the journalists right.

=== Albania investigates Ahmet Çalık's bank ===
The investigation opened by the Albanian Competition Authority against Albania's largest financial institution, Banka Kombetare Tregtare, owned by Ahmet Çalık, Chairman of Çalık Holding, includes Banka Kombetare Tregtare along with Raiffeisen Bank, Credins Bank and Intesa San Paolo Bank. The 4 banks' policies on deposits, bank loans, transfers, commission fees and interest rates have been under deep scrutiny by Albania.

== Family ==
He is married with four children and lives in Istanbul.

== See also ==
- List of Turks by net worth
