= Mehmet Büyükekşi =

Turkish businessman, architect and former president (born 1961)

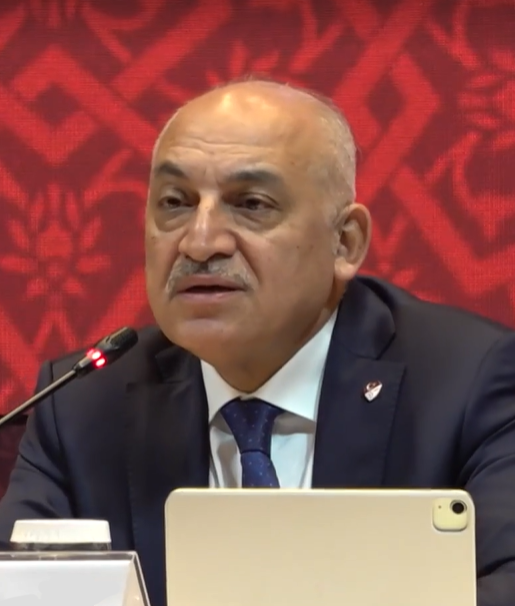
- Büyükekşi in 2022

President of the Turkish Football Federation
- In office 16 June 2022 – 18 July 2024
- Preceded by: Servet Yardımcı (interim)
- Succeeded by: İbrahim Hacıosmanoğlu

Personal details
- Born: 10 May 1961 (age 65) Gaziantep, Turkey
- Children: 3
- Education: Yıldız Technical University
- Occupation: Architect, Businessman

Mehmet Büyükekşi (born 10 May 1961) is a Turkish businessman, architect and former president of the Turkish Football Federation. He was the president for Turkish Süper Lig football club Gaziantep. He served as a board member at Turkish Airlines. He is married and has three children.

Honorary titles
Preceded by Servet Yardımcı (interim)	President of the Turkish Football Federation; 2022–2024	Succeeded by İbrahim Hacıosmanoğlu
