= Megamall Armenia =

Shopping mall in Yerevan, Armenia

Megamall Armenia logo

Megamall Armenia (Armenian: Մեգա մոլ Արմենիա) is a multifunctional shopping and entertainment center in Yerevan, Nor Nork District. It was opened on 23 October 2019. It is the largest shopping and entertainment center in Armenia and in the Caucasus region.

== Description ==
The shopping mall boasts six floors, housing approximately 100 local and international brands. There's a three-level underground parking garage accommodating up to 1,800 cars. Beyond shopping, the mall offers the region's largest playground, a cinema, various restaurants and cafes, and a food court. Additionally, visitors can appreciate "Night," a fresco crafted by the Armenian artist Minas Avetisyan in 1973.

== See also ==
- Dalma Garden Mall
- Rossia Mall
- Yerevan Mall
