= Mehmet Nazif Günal =

Turkish billionaire property developer (born 1948)

- Born: 1948 (age 77–78)
- Education: Middle East Technical University
- Occupation: Businessman
- Known for: Chairman and 100% owner of MNG Holding
- Spouse: Married
- Children: 3

Mehmet Nazif Günal (born 1948) is a Turkish billionaire property developer who is the founder and sole owner of conglomerate Mapa Group, which he controls through a wholly owned holding company.

== Biography ==
Günal was born in 1948. He worked as a construction worker from 1962 to 1965, and as a subcontractor in construction until 1971. In 1971 he graduated from the Middle East Technical University in Ankara, with a master's degree in civil engineering.

Günal founded the Mapa Group in 1976 (originally Gunal Construction Trade and Industry Co. Inc.), and has been managing it ever since. The group is active in construction, tourism and transport, and includes MNG Airlines and had its own TV station, TV8. In the 1980s, the company grew from a medium-sized construction company focused on housing, by Günal quickly diversifying the company. The MNG Group is now active in Southeast Europe, the Caucasus, the Middle East, North Africa, the Ivory Coast and Cameroon. With his group he is active in Algeria, the Ivory Coast, in Georgia, Cameroon, Libya, Romania, Saudi Arabia and in the United Arab Emirates. Günal owns ten 5-star hotels, the WoW (World of Wonders) Kremlin Palace and the WoW Topkapi Palace, in Antalya, are "architecturally exact replicas" of the Kremlin and Topkapi palaces. He is a member of the Atlantic Council's board of directors.

Günal is a former executive of the Fenerbahçe S.K. football club. In July 2015, he bought the majority shares in Swiss football club FC Wil. On 8 February 2017, it was announced that Turkish investors had suddenly pulled out of financing FC Wil. In November it was announced at the club's general meeting that Günal and the investors had invested over 20 million Swiss francs in the club in the one and a half years since buying the majority shares, with a loss of CHF 11 million.

== Controversies ==
Günal is a controversial figure due to his perceived closeness with Turkish president Recep Tayyip Erdoğan, who he once describes as a "second Ataturk". The newspaper Taraf reported inconsistencies in Günal's income in 2015, as he did not appear on the government's list of largest taxpayers.

== Personal life ==
Günal is married, with three children, and lives in Istanbul, Turkey. His son Murathan Doruk Günal is also an engineer and is Vice President of the MNG Group, and served as president of FC Wil. Günal's daughter Merve is an engineer who also works for the MNG group.
