= Antalya gas power plant =

Gas fired power station in Turkey

Aksa Antalya power plant
- Country: Turkey
- Coordinates: 37°07′28″N 30°36′04″E

Power generation
- Nameplate capacity: 900 MW

Antalya gas power plant (Turkish: Ali Metin Kazancı or Aksa Antalya Doğalgaz Santrali) is a gas-fired power station in Antalya Province south-western Turkey. Average annual generation is around 5 TWh.
