= Limak Holding =

Turkish conglomerate

- Industry: Construction, Energy, Media
- Founded: 1976
- Headquarters: Turkey
- Key people: Nihat Özdemir
- Website: limak.com.tr

Limak Holding A.S. is a Turkish conglomerate, with major interests in construction, energy, cement, and tourism. Its assets include the Limak Cement and Limak Energy companies and the Limak Tourism Group. In 2022, it had around $2.5 billion revenue from construction.

Limak was launched in 1976 by Sezai Bacaksız and Nihat Özdemir, with Özdemir focussing on cement and energy while Bacaksız focussed on airports and tourism.

== Recent history ==
Limak site in Dnipro, Ukraine.

In 2013, Limak Holding was part of a joint venture which won the EUR22bn contract to construct a third international airport in Istanbul. The group had previously been part of a joint venture which in 2007 won a 20-year concession to operate Sabiha Gökçen International Airport, and in 2007, together with French firm Aéroport de Lyon, won the concession tender for Pristina International Airport Adem Jashari.

In 2013, it was part of a joint venture which acquired the daily newspaper Akşam, together with TV channel Sky Turk 360 and radio station Alem FM, for TL60m.

In 2013 Nihat Özdemir was among the 41 suspects who were issued arrest orders in the second corruption probe. Prosecutors also appear to be targeting construction companies involved in some of the government’s showpiece infrastructure projects. Those named in media reports included Nihat Ozdemir, head of Limak Group, part of a consortium that won the €22 billion tender to build Istanbul’s third airport». In 2011 Özdemir and Bacaksız were listed as billionaires by Forbes.

Via IC İçtaş Energy it is part owner with IC Holding of two coal-fired power stations in Turkey, Kemeköy power station and Yeniköy power station. Climate TRACE estimates IC İçtaş Energy’s coal-fired power stations emitted over 5 million tons of the country's total 730 million tons of greenhouse gas in 2022, and it has been put on the Urgewald Global Coal Exit List.

Within the scope of the 'Our Love, Our Energy is with You' project, which was started in 2021, the company provided food and water aid to stray animals that had difficulty in finding food due to the cold weather in the winter months.
