= MNG Airlines =

Airline of Turkey

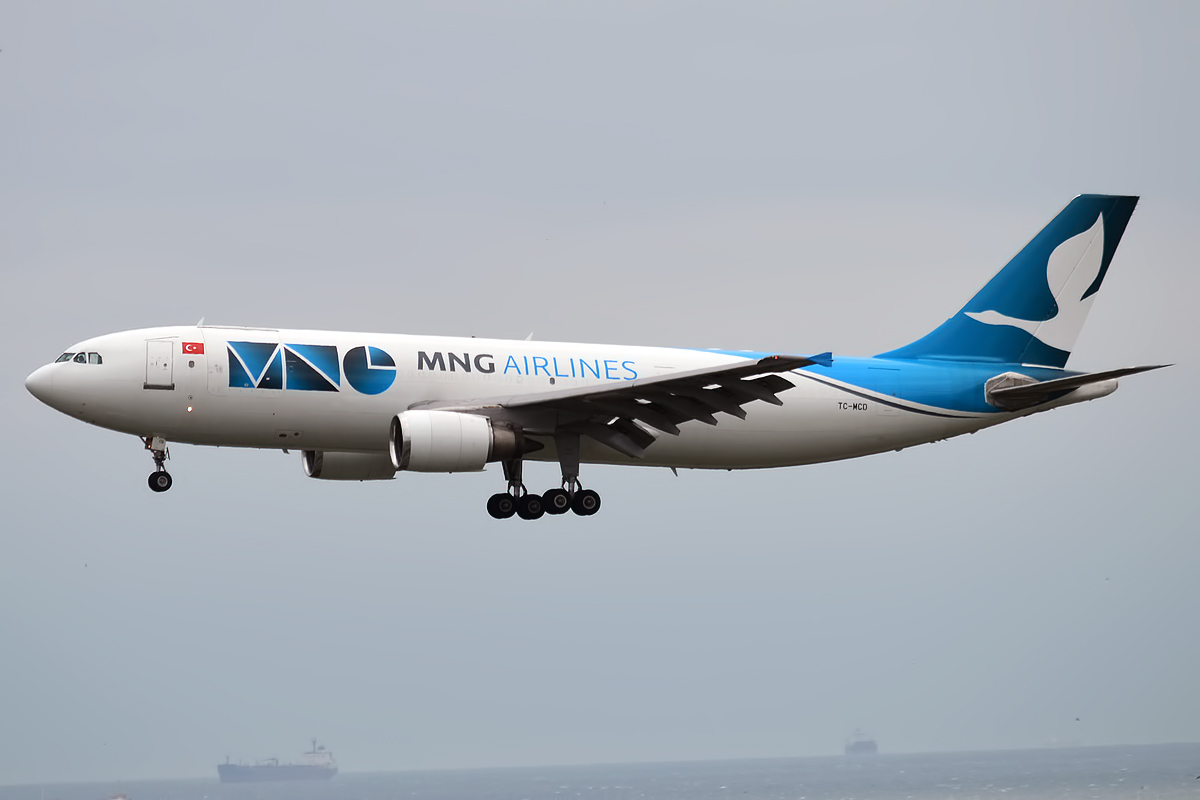
- MNG Airlines A300B4-600R(F) in standard livery
IATA	ICAO	Call sign
MB	MNB	BLACK SEA
- Founded: February 1996; 30 years ago
- Commenced operations: 30 November 1997; 28 years ago
- Hubs: Istanbul Airport
- Subsidiaries: Solinair
- Fleet size: 9
- Destinations: 19
- Headquarters: Istanbul, Turkey
- Key people: Mehmet Nazif Günal, founder
- Website: mngairlines.com

MNG Airlines is a Turkish cargo and passenger charter airline headquartered in Istanbul based at Istanbul Airport.

== History ==
The airline was established by Mehmet Nazif Günal in 1997 and started operations on 30 November 1997. Transatlantic services began in 1998 with a flight from Frankfurt to Toronto, followed by scheduled services to the United States on 8 November 1998. In mid-2002, passenger operations were added. In 2005, MNG won an award from Airbus for 100% reliability on the 30-year-old Airbus A300. In 2006, MNG ceased all passenger flights; only cargo flights are being continued. In 2008, MNG Airlines acquired the Slovenian cargo company Solinair.

In 2020, MNG began the operation of its twice-weekly freighter service linking Cologne Bonn Airport (CGN) in Germany and John F. Kennedy International (JFK) in New York. The new flight is an expansion of the carrier's routes flown from CGN, which include flights to Istanbul Atatürk Airport (ISL) on behalf of Air France, and Tel Aviv Ben Gurion Airport (TLV) for its own operations.

On Aug 9, 2023, MNG Airlines (MNGA) Cancels New York Stock Exchange Listing.

== Corporate affairs ==
=== Ownership ===
Ghita Holding (member of Abu Dhabi's IHC mega-group) acquired a 44 percent stake in MNG Havayollari ve Tasimacilik A.S. (commonly known as ‘MNG Airlines’) for $211.2 million.

== Destinations ==
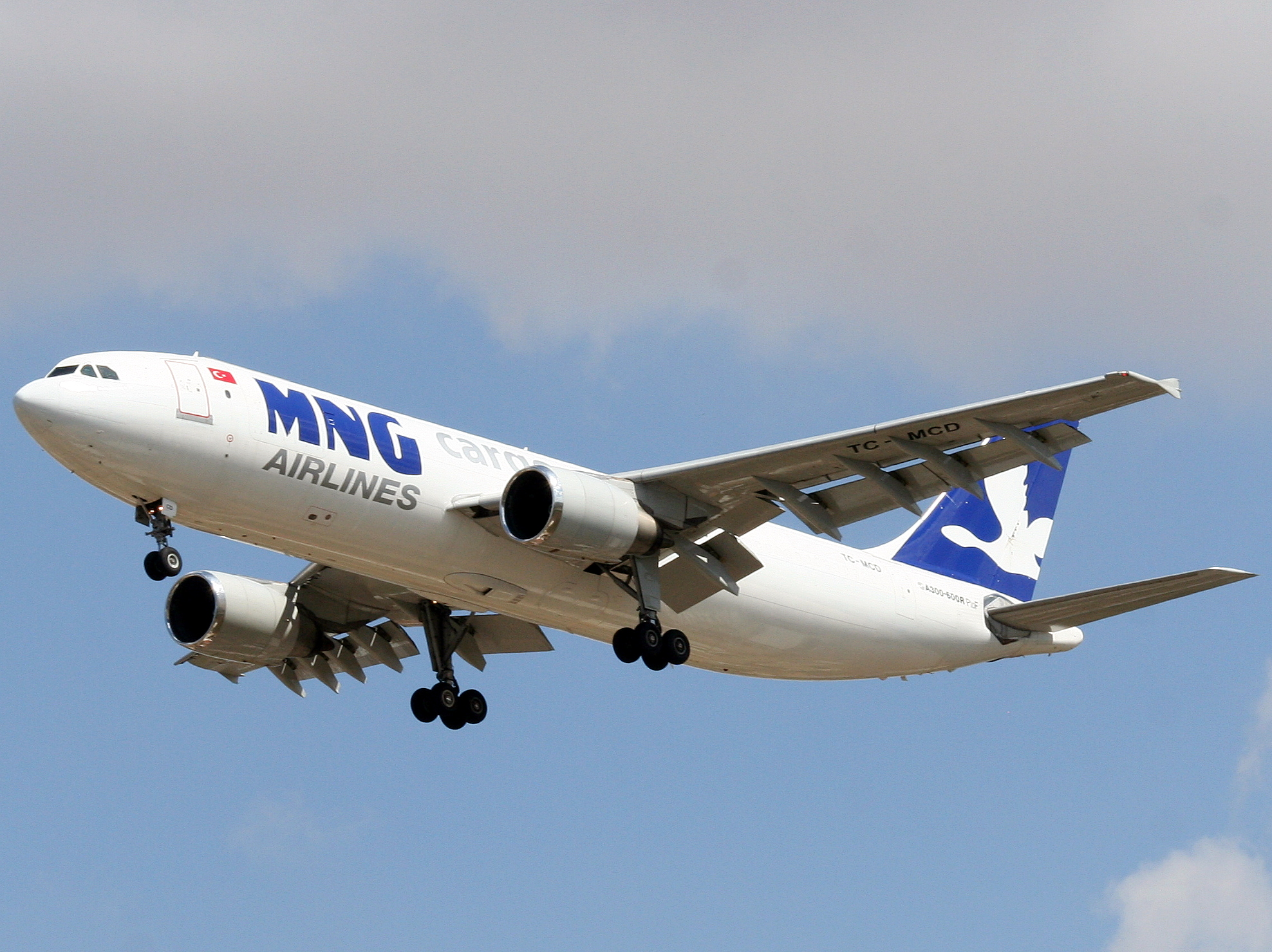
MNG Airlines Airbus A300-600RF

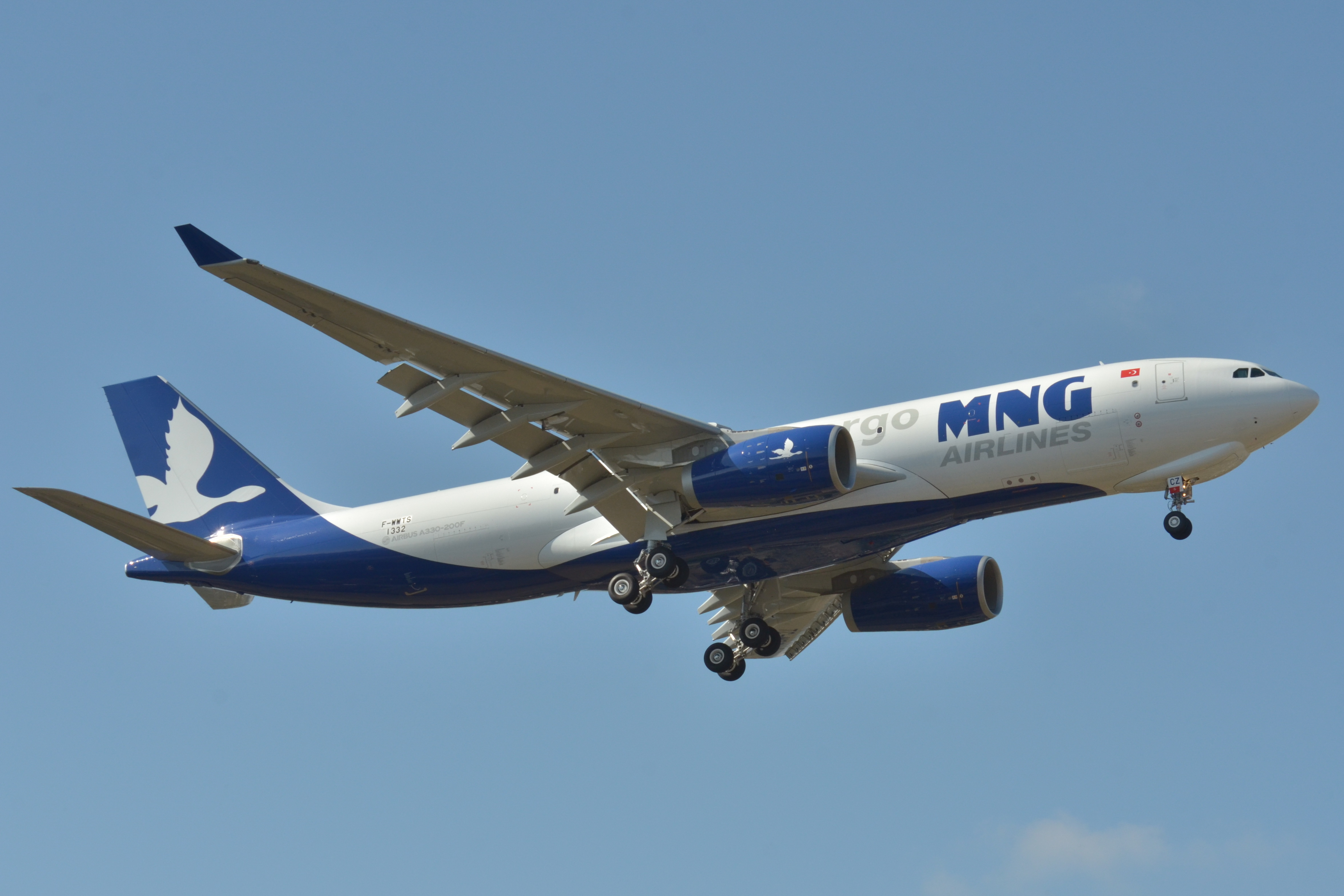
MNG Airlines Airbus A330-200F

MNG Airlines operates scheduled and charter services within Europe, and to Asia and North America destinations. It operated scheduled freighter services to the following destinations as of July 2013:

=== Africa ===
- Algeria
  - Algiers - Houari Boumediene Airport
  - Oran - Ahmed Ben Bella Airport
- Libya
  - Tripoli – Mitiga International Airport
  - Misrata - Misrata International Airport
- Tunisia
  - Tunis - Tunis–Carthage International Airport

=== Asia ===
- Bahrain
  - Manama – Bahrain International Airport
- Iraq
  - Baghdad - Baghdad International Airport
- Israel
  - Tel Aviv – Ben Gurion Airport
- Kazakhstan
  - Aktobe – Aktobe Airport
- Pakistan
  - Karachi - Jinnah International Airport
  - Lahore - Allama Iqbal International Airport
- Qatar
  - Doha - Hamad International Airport
- United Arab Emirates
  - Abu Dhabi - Abu Dhabi International Airport
  - Dubai - Al Maktoum International Airport
- China
  - Urumqi – Urumqi International Airport

=== Europe ===
- Croatia
  - Zagreb – Zagreb Airport
- France
  - Paris – Charles de Gaulle Airport
- Germany
  - Cologne – Cologne/Bonn Airport
  - Leipzig – Leipzig/Halle Airport
  - Munich – Munich Airport
- Netherlands
  - Amsterdam – Amsterdam Airport Schiphol
- Turkey
  - Istanbul – Istanbul Airport (Hub)
- United Kingdom
  - London – London Luton Airport
  - Birmingham – Birmingham Airport
  - East Midlands - East Midlands Airport

=== North America ===
- United States
  - New York City - John F. Kennedy International Airport

== Fleet ==
As of August 2025, MNG Airlines operates the following aircraft:

MNG Airlines fleet
Aircraft	In fleet	Orders	Notes
Airbus A300-600RF	1	—	
Airbus A321-200/P2F	2	—	
Airbus A330-200F	2	—	
Airbus A330-300/P2F	4	—	
Airbus A350F	—	2	
Total	9	2	
