= Şaban Cemil Kazancı =

Turkish businessperson (born 1961)

Şaban Cemil Kazancı (1961, Istanbul) is a Turkish businessperson. He is the chair and CEO of Kazancı Holding and Aksa Energy.

Kazancı is ranked among the 900 richest people in the world as of April 2026.

== Life ==
Born in Istanbul as the son of Ali Metin Kazancı, who is originally from Rize, he began his career working in the family business specializing in generator production. He played a direct role in the expansion of the family company, which evolved into Aksa Energy in 1997. Currently, he serves as the chair of the executive board of Kazancı Holding and Aksa Energy.

== Personal life ==
Kazancı is married and has one child. He is a recipient of the Uzbekistan Order of Friendship.
