= Çalık Holding =

Turkish company

- Type: Private
- Industry: Textile, energy, construction, finance, and mining
- Founded: 1997; 29 years ago
- Founder: Ahmet Çalık
- Headquarters: Şişli, Istanbul, Turkey
- Key people: Ahmet Çalık (chairman)
- Revenue: ▲US$2.8bn
- Total assets: ▲US$12.7bn (2023)
- Number of employees: 17,000
- Website: calik.com

Çalık Holding is a Turkish company that has been operating in the energy, construction, mining, textile, and finance sectors since the 1980s. Founder and chairman Ahmet Çalık began his business career in the textile industry, founding Orta Doğu Tekstil in 1981 and Çalık Denim in 1987. During the early-1990s independence of CIS countries, he made his first foreign investments and founded Gap Pazarlama (to increase his company's share of international textile trading) and Gap İnşaat (to build plants). These companies were brought together as Çalık Holding in 1997. The umbrella company founded Çalık Enerji in 1998 and Aktif Bank in 1999, to enter the energy and finance sectors.

Growing by investments since the 2000s, Çalık Holding acquired Banka Kombëtare Tregtare (operating in Albania and Kosovo). The group acquired ALBtelecom (Albania's oldest landline operator and Internet provider) in 2007, entering the telecom sector.

Çalık Holding entered the mining sector in a partnership with Canadian-based Anatolia Minerals, a member of the Toronto Stock Exchange. It founded Çalık Cotton in 2011, aiming to be among the top 10 global companies in the cotton trade.

After participating in the privatization of the electricity-distribution sector, Çalık Holding provided electricity to seven million customers (according to 2015 data). The company acquired YEDAŞ in 2010, Kosovo Electricity Distribution Company (KEDS, in association with Limak Holding) in 2012, and ARAS EDAŞ (in association with Kiler Holding) in 2013.

Subsidiary Çalık Enerji was included in ENR's annual list of top 250 international contractors. The company turned its 20-year business relationship with the Mitsubishi Corporation into a partnership in 2015, when Mitsubishi acquired 4.5 percent of Çalik Enerji. Çalık Holding employs over 28,000 people in 17 countries, and its assets are valued at US$7.6 billion.

== Sectors ==
=== Textiles ===
Çalık's background is in textiles, with the family's involvement in the sector dating to the 1930s. The first company, Ortadoğu Tekstil, was founded by Ahmet Çalık in 1981; Gap Güneydoğu Tekstil was founded to manufacture denim in 1987. In 1997, a factory was established in Turkmenistan.

=== Energy ===
- Çalık Enerji
- Yeşilırmak Electricity Distribution Company (YEDAS)
- Kosovo Energy Distribution Services (KEDS)
- Aras Edaş

In 2012, Çalık Holding completed construction of a new power plant in Iraq. It and another plant (under construction) will supply 2,000 MW and a potential capacity of 4,500 MW.

=== Construction ===
- Gap İnşaat

=== Mining ===
- Lidya Madencilik
- Polimetal Madencilik

=== Finance ===
Çalıkbank was founded in 1999, and was renamed Aktif Yatırım Bankası in 2008. Sixty percent of Albania's Banka Kombetare Tregtare was acquired in 2006, and the remainder in 2009. Other financial holdings are BKT. and Aktif Bank. The latter has come under scrutiny for potential money-laundering and other financial crimes.
