= Celio (retailer) =

French men's clothing retailer

- Type: Private limited liability company
- Industry: Retailing
- Founded: 1978
- Headquarters: Saint-Ouen, France
- Key people: Christian Pimont (CEO), Maurice and Laurent Grosman (Founders)
- Products: Clothing
- Revenue: € 1.1 billion (2013)
- Number of employees: 1800
- Website: www.celio.com

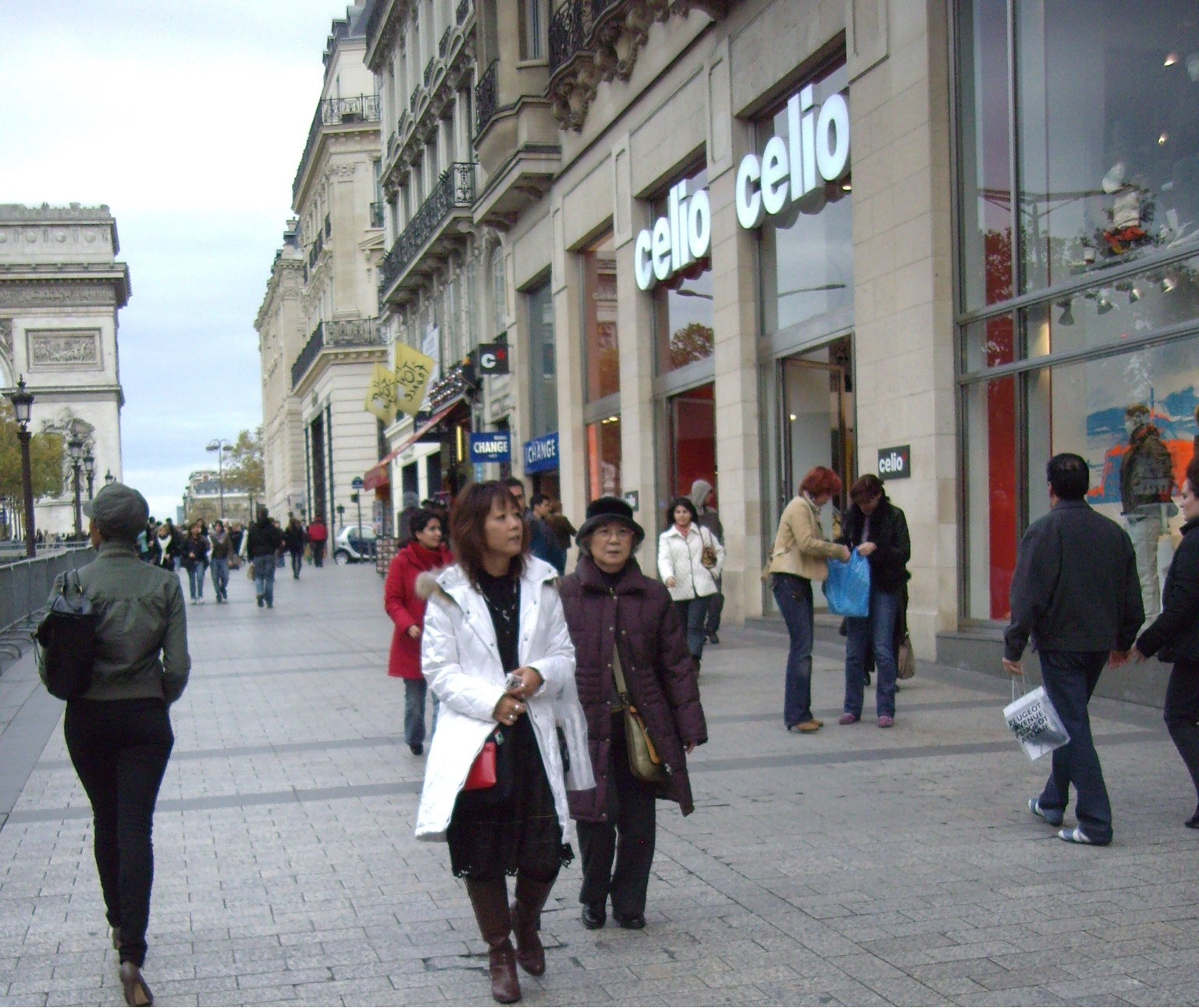
Celio flagship store on the Avenue des Champs-Élysées, Paris.

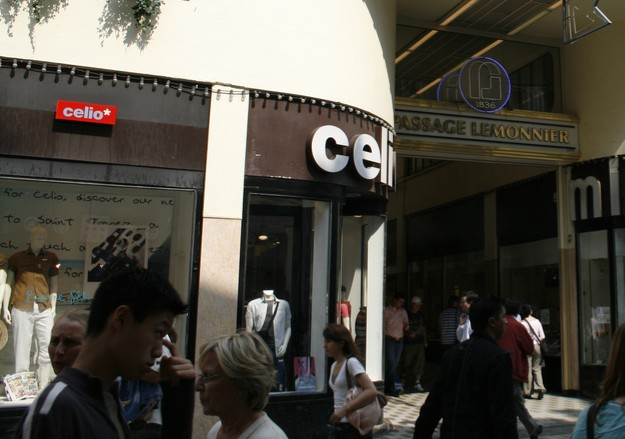
Celio branch in Liège, Belgium.

Celio (officially), or celio* (in advertising), is a French men's clothing retailer headquartered in Saint-Ouen, France. It caters primarily to the Continental European market. Most of Celio's stores are located in shopping centres, with a smaller percentage to be found in the shopping districts of cities and large suburbs. In 2005, the group employed over 1,800 people, with around 1,500 working in stores and the remainder at the group's headquarters and warehouses.

== History ==
In 1978, two brothers took over their family shop located in rue Saint-Lazare, in Paris. They began opening other shops as early as 1980, all in Parisian region. The concept, Celio, being truly born in 1985. In 1989, Celio had 34 establishments in France. In 1992, store counts had reached 150 establishments in France. They began opening shops in Belgium and in Spain, then in Portugal (1994) and Italy (1999).

== Locations ==
Celio has stores, sub-offices, and warehouses in 56 countries on six continents. 70% of Celio shops are in shopping centers, while 30% are street locations.
