= Bolu Göynük power station =

Coal fired power station in Turkey

- Country: Turkey
- Coordinates: 40°15′08″N 30°48′40″E
- Status: Operational
- Commission date: 2015
- Owner: Kazancı Holding

Thermal power station
- Primary fuel: Lignite

Power generation
- Nameplate capacity: 270 MW
- Annual net output: 1,957 GWh (2022); 1,964 GWh (2019); 2,061 GWh (2020); 2,115 GWh (2021)

External links
- Website: www.aksaenerji.com.tr/en/power-plants/lignite/bolu-goynuk-thermal-power-plant/

Bolu Göynük power station (also known as Aksa Göynuk TES) is a 270-megawatt coal-fired power station in Turkey in Göynük, Bolu Province, which burns lignite.
