= Servet Yardımcı =

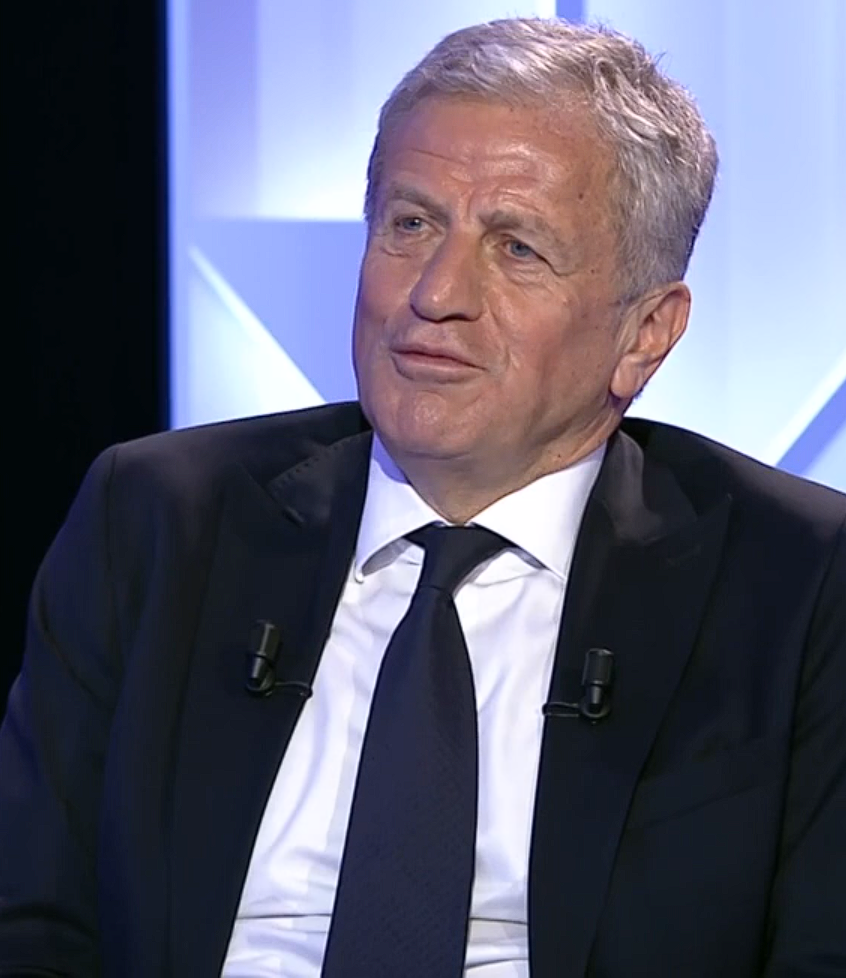
Yardımcı in 2021

Servet Yardımcı (born 26 December 1957) is a Turkish sports official who is a board member of UEFA.

== Early life ==
Yardımcı is a native of Rize, Turkey. He was born to Şevket Yardımcı and Saymur Yardımcı.

== Career ==
Yardımcı was the interim president of the Turkish Football Federation.

== Personal life ==
Yardımcı is married and has two children.
