= LC Waikiki =

Turkish clothing company

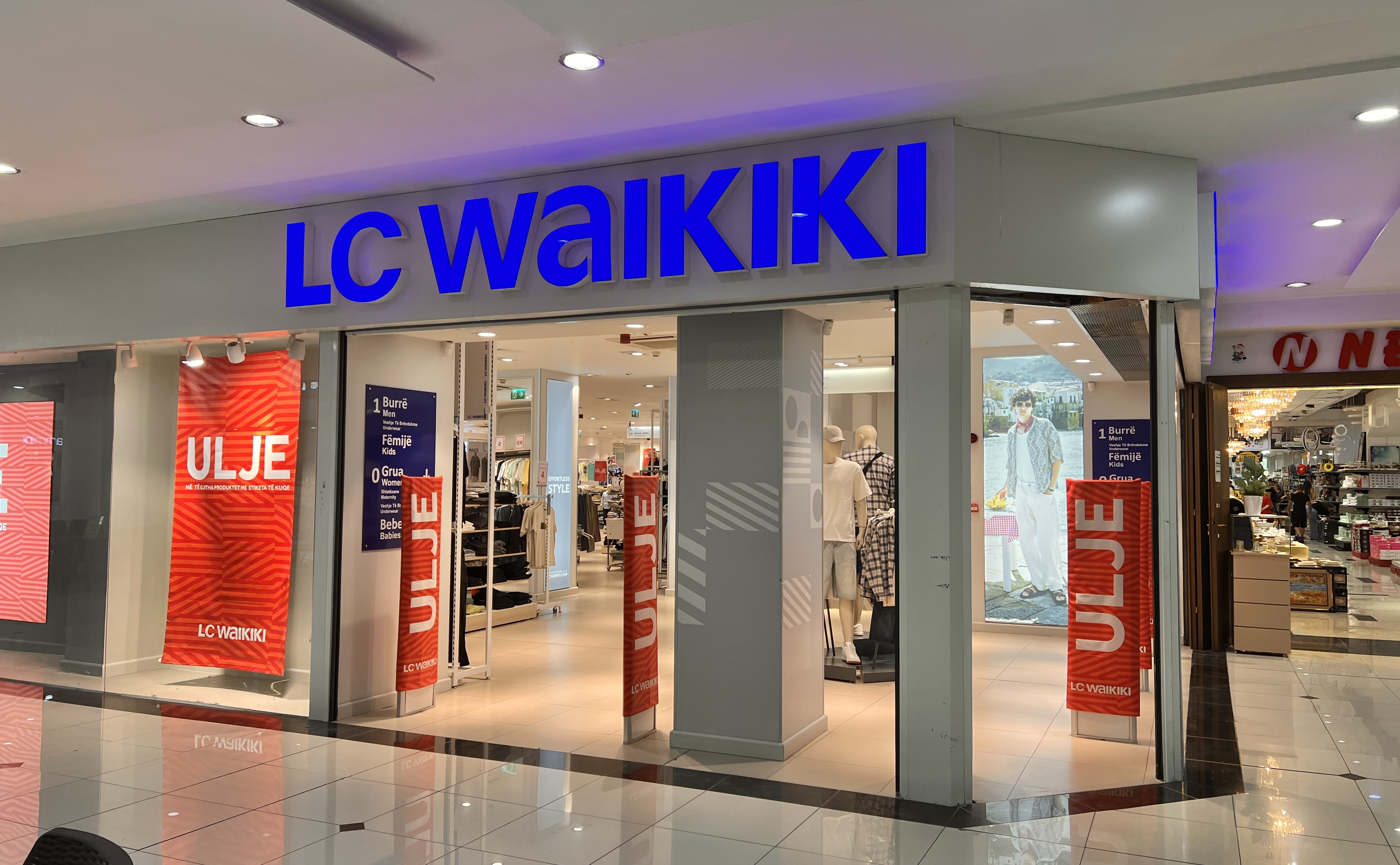
- LC Waikiki store in Đakovica, Serbia
- Type: Private
- Industry: Retail
- Founded: 1988; 38 years ago
- Founder: Georges Amouyal
- Headquarters: Istanbul, Turkey
- Number of locations: ▲1,300 (2024)
- Area served: Worldwide
- Key people: Vahap Küçük (chairman); Mustafa Küçük (CEO)
- Products: Clothing
- Revenue: ▲US$4.92 billion (2024)
- Owner: LC Waikiki Mağazacılık
- Number of employees: ▲55,000 (2024)
- Subsidiaries: XSIDE; LCW Home
- Website: www.lcw.com
- Footnotes; Exports: US$1.2 billion (2024).

LC Waikiki (stylised LCW) is a Turkish ready-to-wear clothing and lifestyle retailer headquartered in Istanbul. The brand was founded in France in 1988 and became Turkish-owned in 1997 after acquisition by Tema Tekstil (Taha Group). The name combines LC for the French phrase Les Copains (“friends”) with “Waikiki,” referencing the beach in Hawaiʻi.

== History ==
Founded in Paris in 1988 by Georges Amouyal, LC Waikiki was acquired by Turkey's Tema Tekstil in 1997 and restructured in Istanbul. The company’s early identity featured a chimpanzee mascot, prominent in its 1990s branding. Its 1,000th store opened in Kyiv in 2020.

== Operations ==
LC Waikiki reported net sales of approximately US$4.92 billion (₺144.7 billion) and exports of US$1.2 billion*for 2024, employing around 55,000 staff and managing over 1,200 stores. Independent media coverage cites a turnover of about US$7.04 billion (₺207 billion) in 2024 a 55% year-on-year increase.

According to the LC Waikiki website, retail stores are in the following countries:

- The Americas: Chile, Costa Rica, Curacao, Dominican Republic, Ecuador, Guatemala, Panama, Peru, Venezuela, and now in El Salvador's Multiplaza shopping center.
- Africa: Algeria, Côte d'Ivoire, Dem. Republic of Congo, Egypt, Ghana, Kenya, Libya, Mauritius, Morocco, Reunion (FRANCE), Tanzania, Tunisia, Uganda, Zambia.
- Asia: Kazakhstan, Kyrgyzstan, Malaysia, Mongolia, Tajikistan, Uzbekistan.
- Europe: Albania, Armenia, Azerbaijan, Belarus, Bosnia & Herzegovina, Bulgaria, Croatia, Greece, Hungary, Kosovo, Macedonia, Malta, Moldova, Montenegro, Northern Cyprus, Russia, Romania, Serbia, Ukraine, Georgia.
- Middle East: Bahrain, Palestine (there are no stores in Israel), Iraq, Jordan, Kuwait, Lebanon, Oman, Palestine, Qatar, Saudi Arabia, UAE.

== Global Presence ==
As of 2024, LC Waikiki operates ~1,300 stores across 61 countries on five continents, including new entries in Chile, Guatemala, Côte d’Ivoire, Somalia, and Mongolia.

== E-Commerce ==
In 2024, LC Waikiki’s e-commerce site lcwaikiki.com achieved first-party net online sales of US$163.1 million, primarily within the fashion sector.

== Ownership ==
Ownership breakdown: Küçük Family 47.49%; Dizdar Family 35.22%; Kısacık Family 7.21%; Amouyal Family 6.50%; Others 3.59%.
