= Rahmi M. Koç Museum =

Private industrial museum in Istanbul, Turkey

- Rahmi M. Koç Müzesi
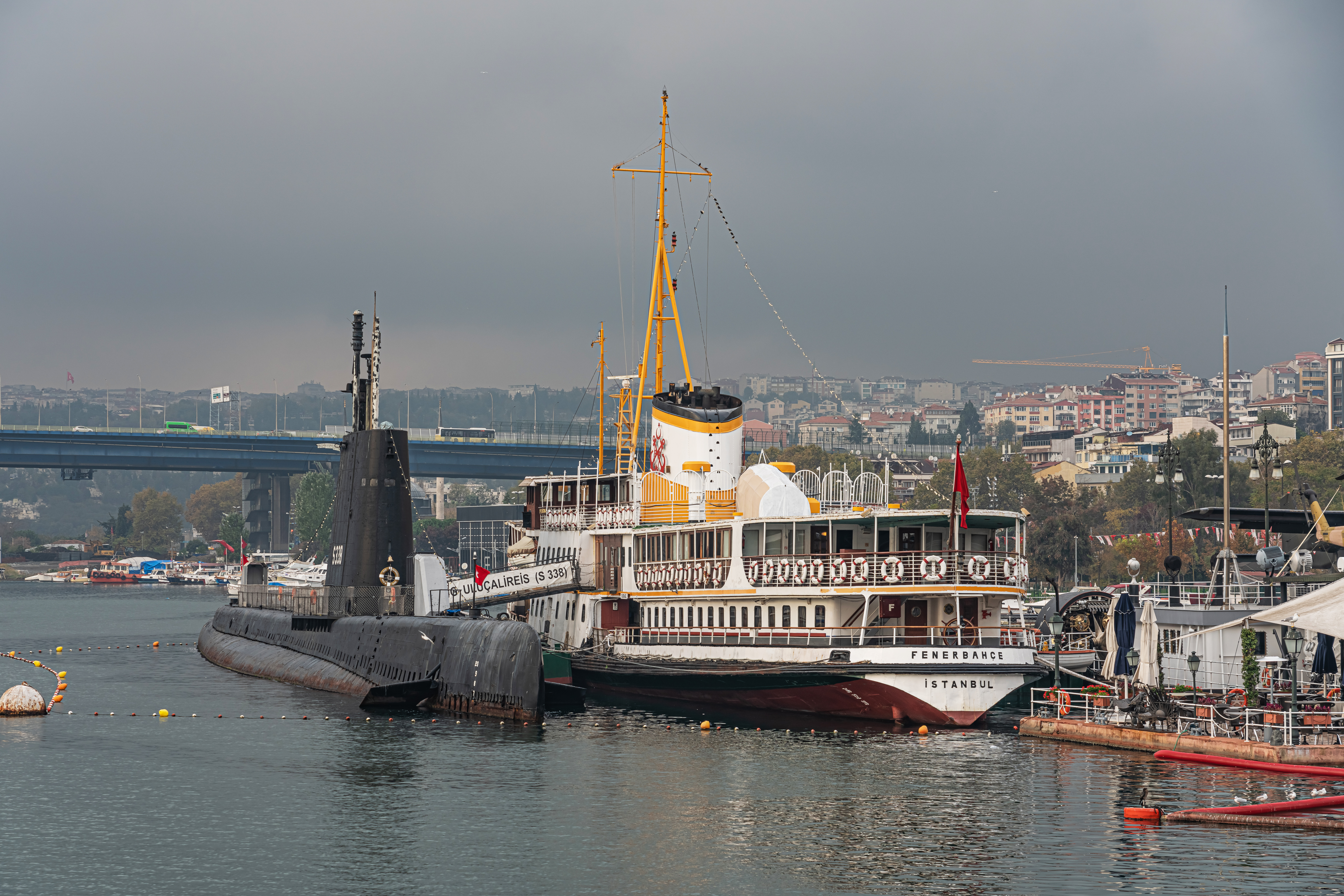

- Location of Rahmi M. Koç Museum
- Established: December 13, 1994; 31 years ago
- Location: Hasköy, Istanbul, Turkey
- Coordinates: 41.04227°N 28.94926°E
- Type: Technology
- President: Rahmi M. Koç
- Website: Official website

The Rahmi M. Koç Museum is a private industrial museum in Istanbul, Turkey dedicated to the history of transport, industry and communications. Rahmi M. Koç, member of one of the wealthiest families in Turkey and retired chairman (currently the honorary chairman) of the Koç Group, founded the museum in 1991, which was opened on December 13, 1994. The museum is located in the suburb of Hasköy on the northern shore of the Golden Horn and situated in two historical buildings connected to each other. It is open to public every day except Monday.

A sister museum, but smaller in size, the Çengelhan Rahmi M. Koç Museum opened its doors in Ankara in 2005, followed by a third Rahmi M. Koç Museum on Cunda Island in 2014.

== History ==
A visit of Rahmi Koç to the Henry Ford Museum in Dearborn, Michigan, United States inspired him to create this museum. The Koç Foundation bought the first museum building in 1991, which was left derelict and seriously damaged after a roof fire in 1984. This building (in Turkish: Lengerhane), was initially used for casting anchors and chains for the Ottoman Navy, during the rule of Sultan Ahmed III (1703–1730). It was restored during the reign of Selim III (1789–1807) before passing into the ownership of the Ministry of Finance in the Ottoman Empire. During the Republican era, the State Monopoly and Tobacco Co. then used the building as a warehouse until 1951. The Koç Foundation spent two and a half years for the restoration work of this Class II category historical monument.

In July 2001, the museum opened a new building to improve the display of its collection of industrial and scientific artifacts. This new section was a disused historical dockyard, founded in 1861 by the Ottoman maritime company Şirket-i Hayriye for the maintenance and reparation works of its own ships. The Koç Foundation bought the building in 1996.

The two buildings are on the same road, on opposite sides: the dockyard part of the complex is on the shores of the Golden Horn. A glass-sided ramp leads down to the basement exhibition area of the Lengerhane.

== Exhibits ==
=== Permanent exhibitions ===
Most of the items exhibited in the museum are selected from Rahmi Koç's private collection. Other objects are either borrowed from or donated by various organizations and individuals. Original machines and their replicas, scientific and mechanical items make up the basis of the museum's exhibits.

- Road transport: Racing cars, sports cars (between 1953 and 1986), sedan/coupé and convertible cars (1898–1994), utility vehicles (1911–1963), commercial vehicles (1908–2002), motorcycles (1908–2003),
- Rail transport: Old Istanbul tram (1934), Sultan’s carriage (1867), steam engine locomotive (1913), narrow-gauge steam locomotive (1930), Istanbul Tünel carriage (1876), Henschel steam locomotive (1918),
- Marine: Cargo vessel, motorboat, lifeboat (1951), Bosphorus passenger ferryboat, outboard motor collection, amphibious car (1961), Kısmet, Sadun Boro's sloop, he circumnavigated the globe with it as the first ever Turkish sailor,
- Aviation: Aircraft (1941–1979), aviation parts collection, aircraft engines (1928–1979), large and small-scale aircraft models,
- Engineering: Ferry boat steam engine (1911), olive oil factory, portable stationary steam engine (1872), gas engine, wood saw, marine compound steam engine (1900),
- Communications: Rotary dial telephone (1920), phonograph (1903), Thomas Edison telegraph patent model (1876), valve amplifier (1936), zoetrope (1835),
- Scientific instruments: Wimshurst machine, grand orrery, marine chronometer, Strasbourg turret clock,
- Models and toys: Hands-on: Cutaway car, aeroplane, scientific experiments and cutaway domestic goods.

=== Temporary exhibitions ===
- "Leonardo, the universal genius" was the title of the first ever temporary exhibition featuring a collection of 40 full-sized artworks, all created from the original drawings made by Leonardo da Vinci. The reproductions of the machines are envisaged in the famous "Codex Leicester", a collection of largely scientific manuscripts of Leonardo written between 1478 and 1513. The exhibits were grouped in five broad categories: Mechanisms and the four ancient elements of nature: Earth, Water, Air and Fire. The "Mechanisms" section included inventions pertaining to everyday life such as gears and lifting systems. A printing press and robot design were displayed at the "Earth" section. At the "Air" section, parachutes and flying machines like the ornithopter bicycle were on display. The "Fire" section displayed machines of war, cannons and machine guns; while water-related inventions such as Archimedes' screw made up the "Water" section. All displays were in functioning condition, and the majority could be operated by the visitors themselves, making the interactive exhibition cultural, educational, and also fun. The show was held from November 1 to December 31, 2006. A few items were also on show at the Çengelhan Rahmi M. Koç Museum in Ankara.

== Images ==
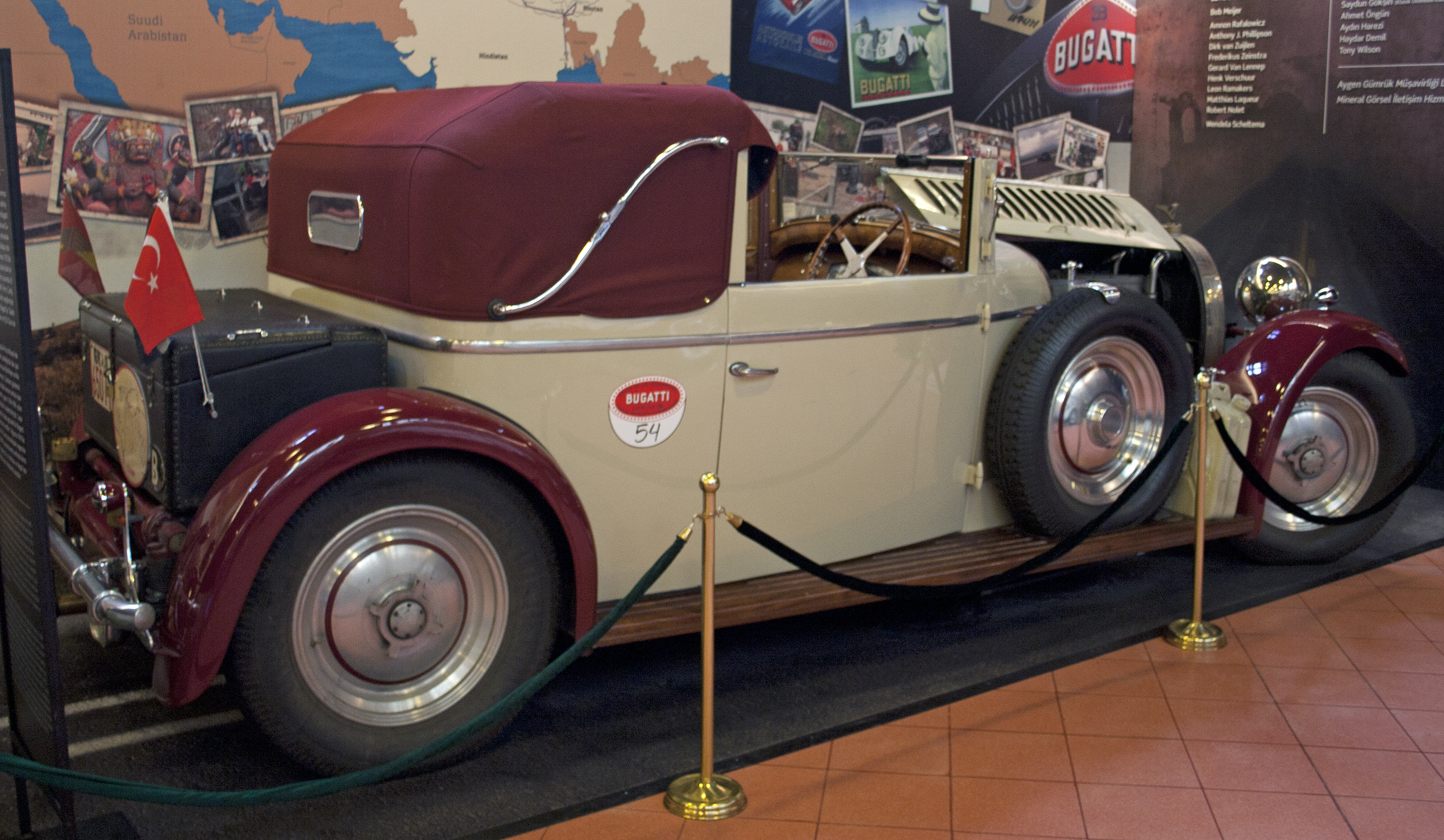
1930 Bugatti Type 46 Coupé de Ville

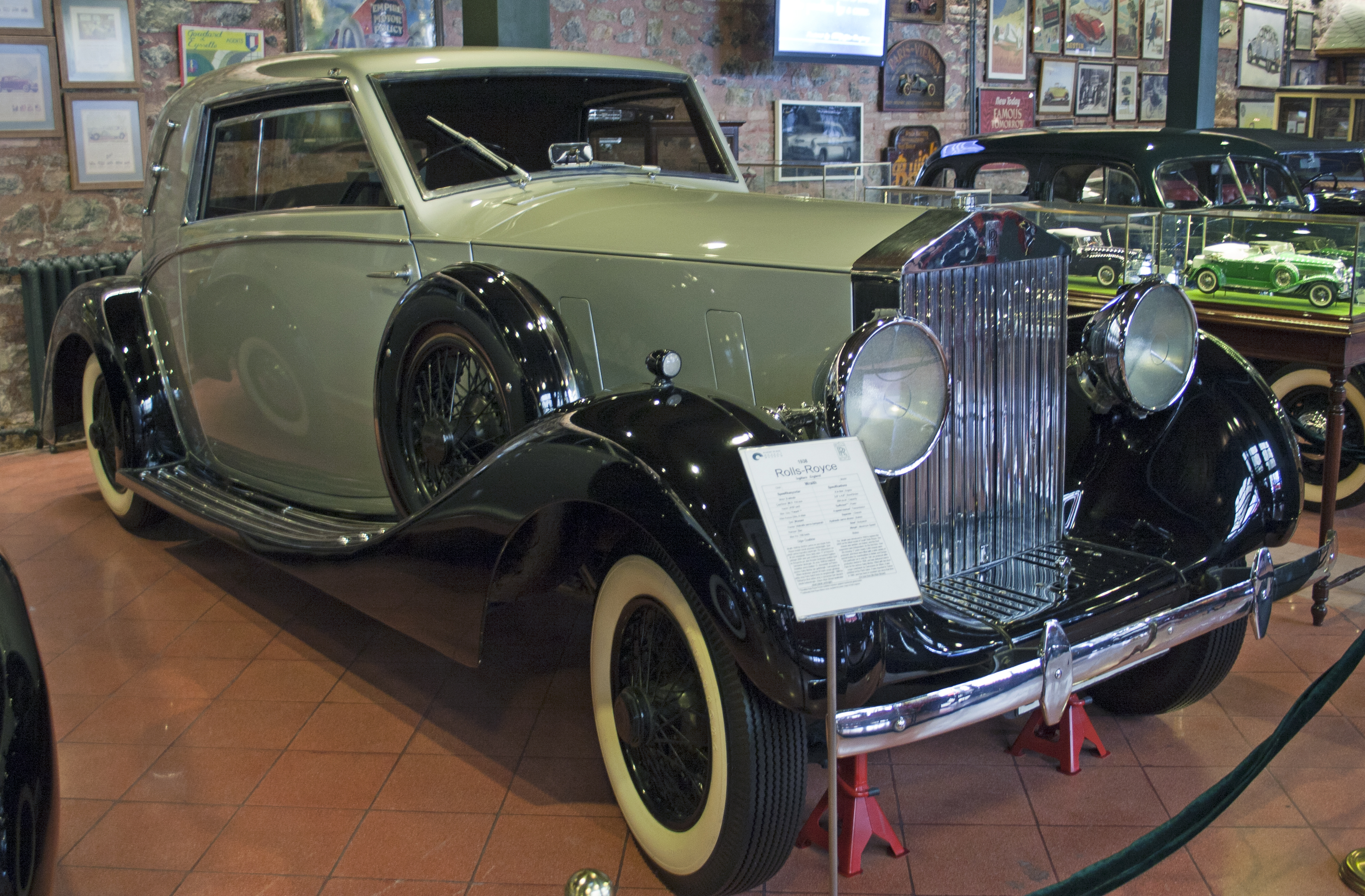
1938 Rolls-Royce Wraith Coupé

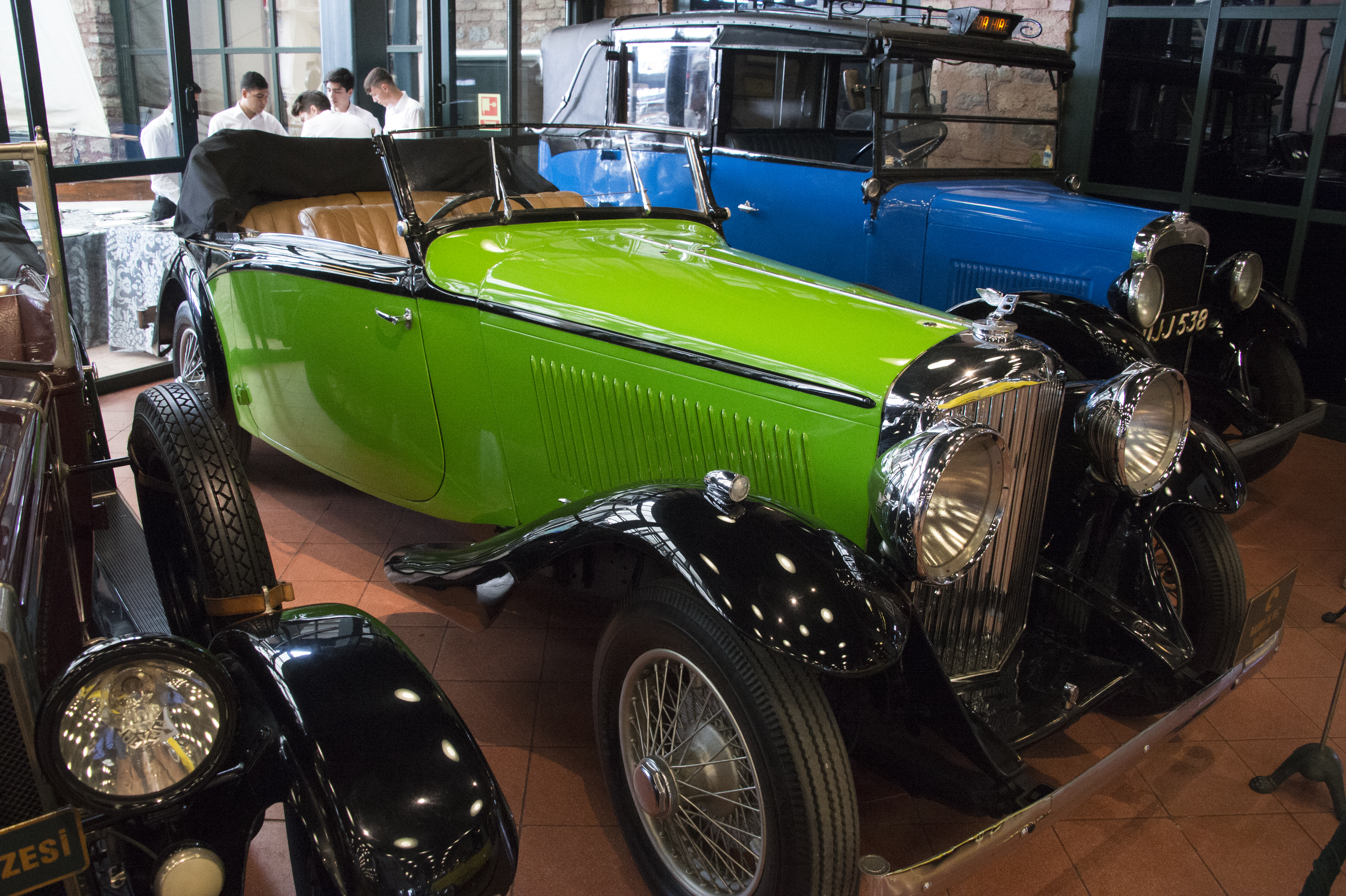
1935 Bentley 3.5 Litre Convertible

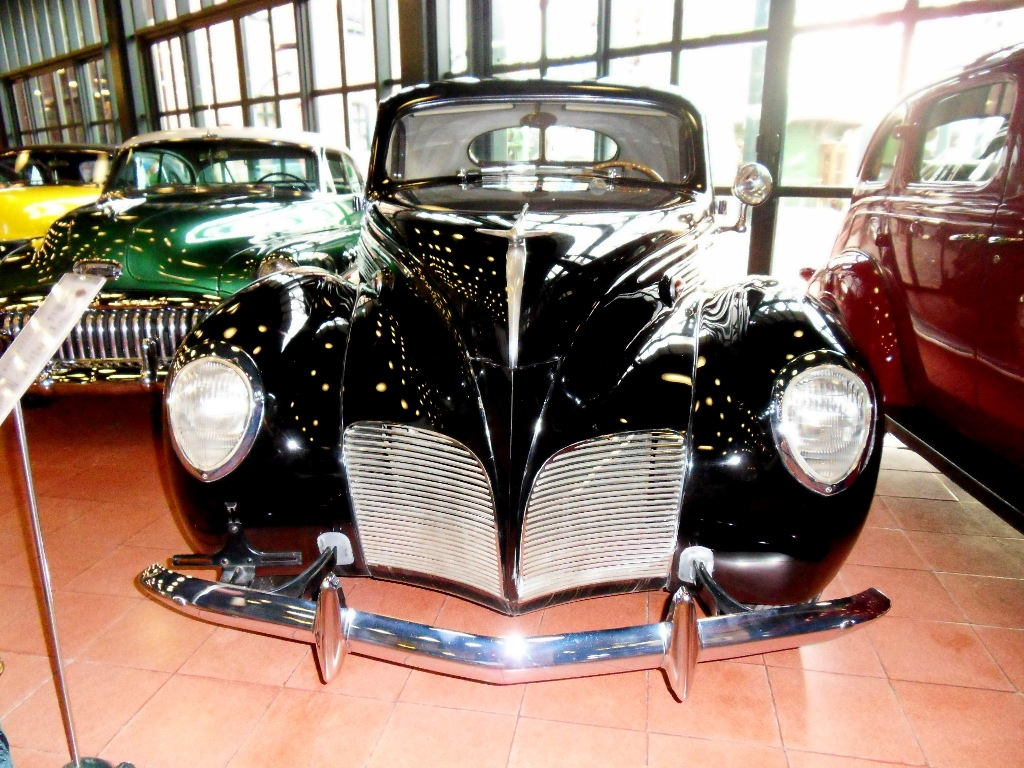
1938 Lincoln Zephyr Coupé

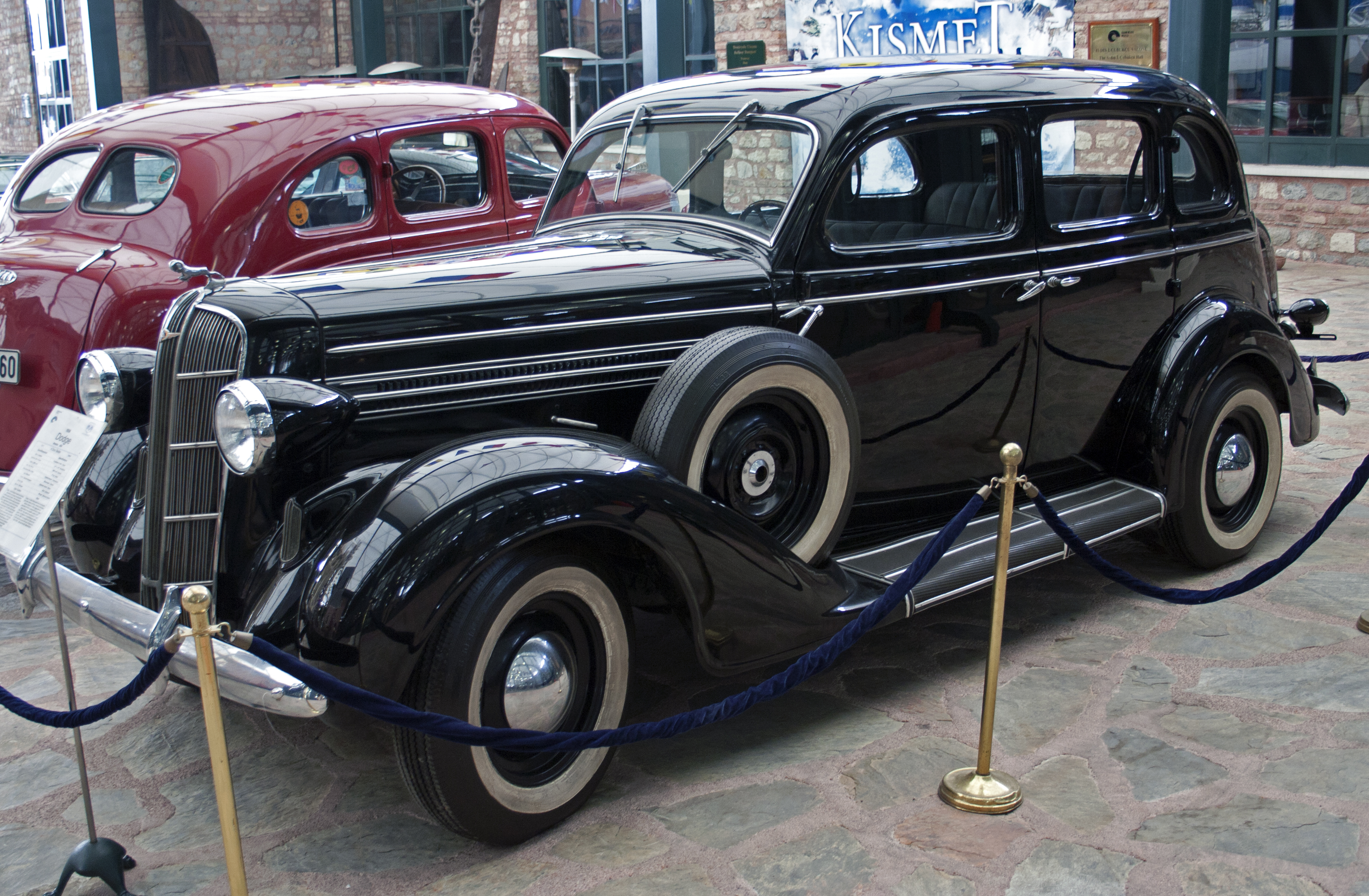
1936 Dodge Six Touring Sedan

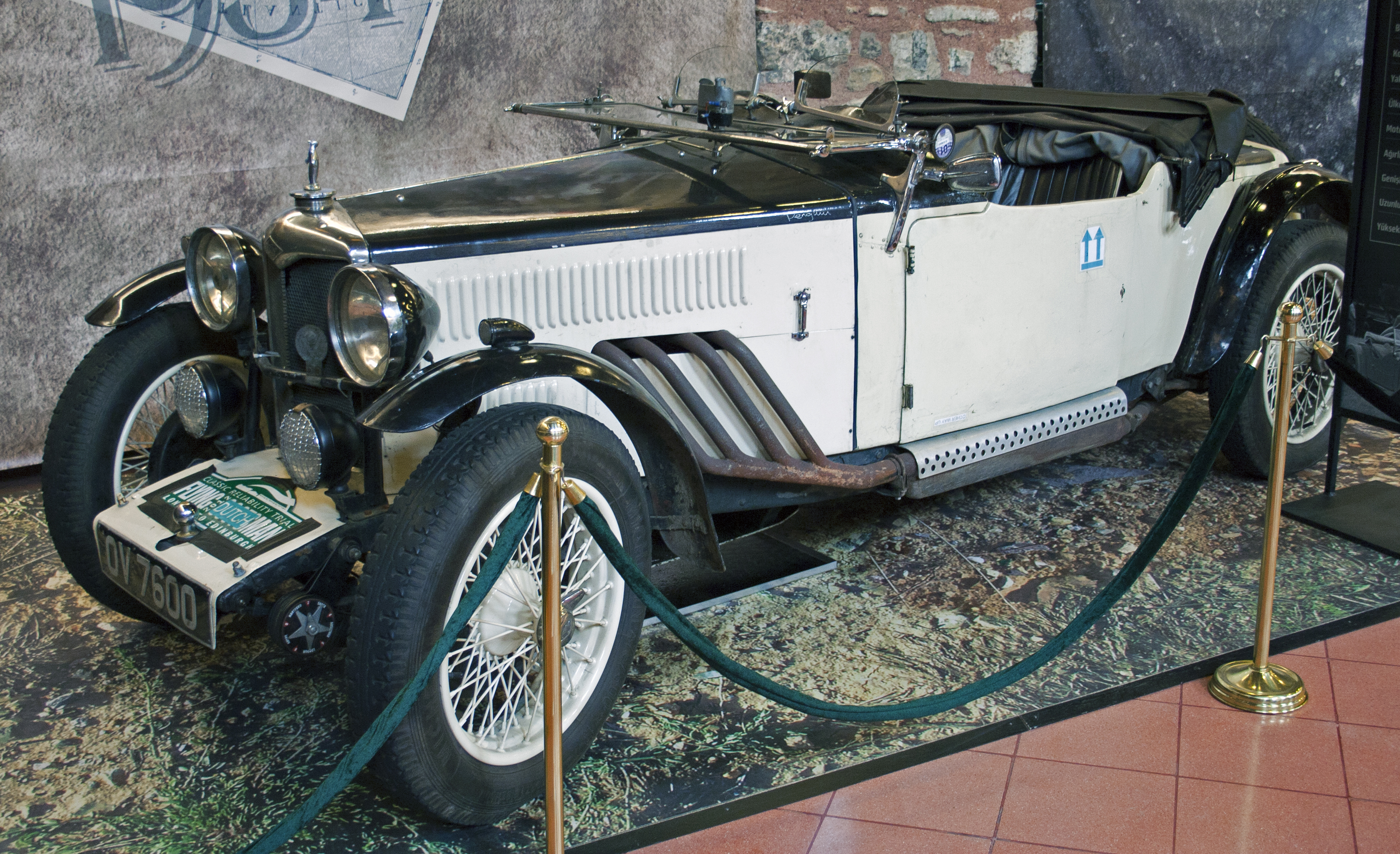
1932 Riley Gamecock Sprite Roadster

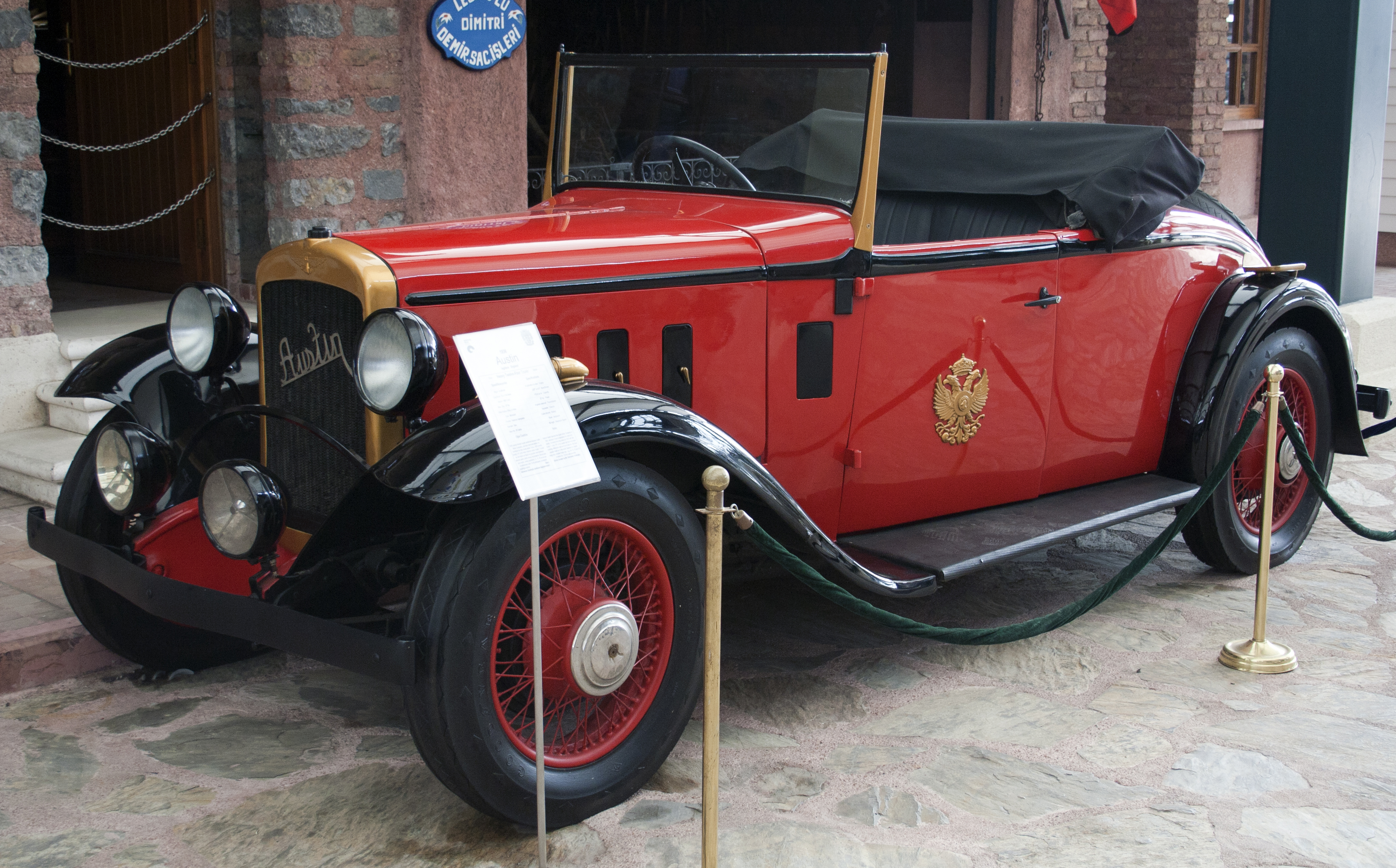
1936 Austin 12 Roadster

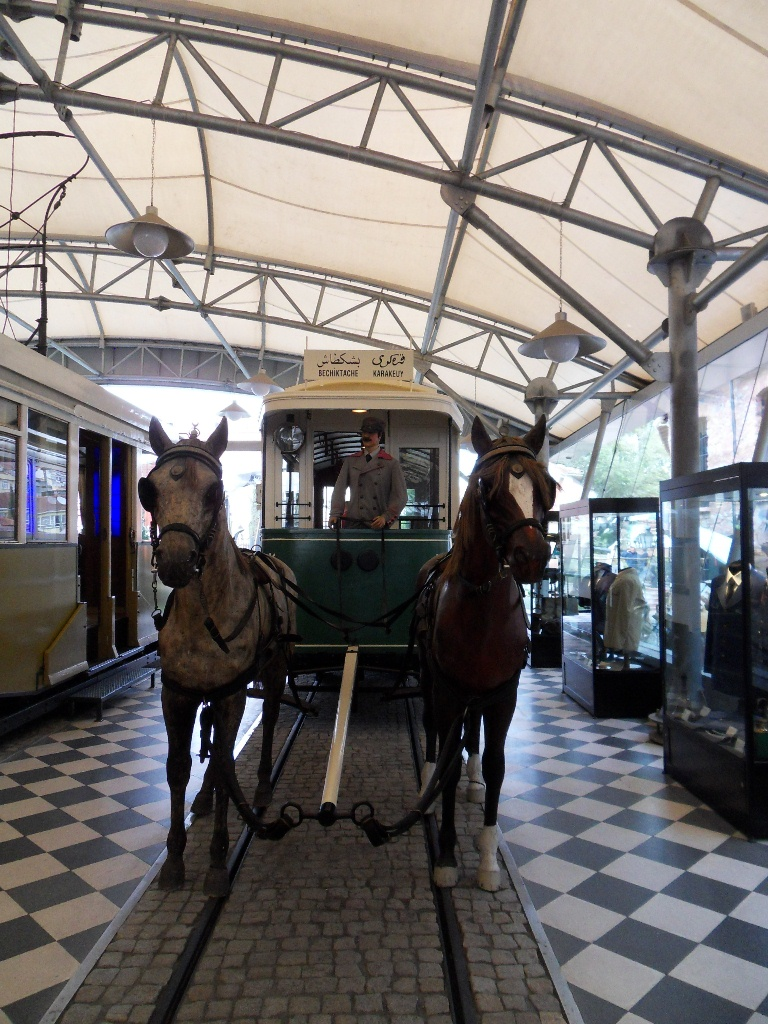
Horse-drawn tram of Istanbul (1872–1914)

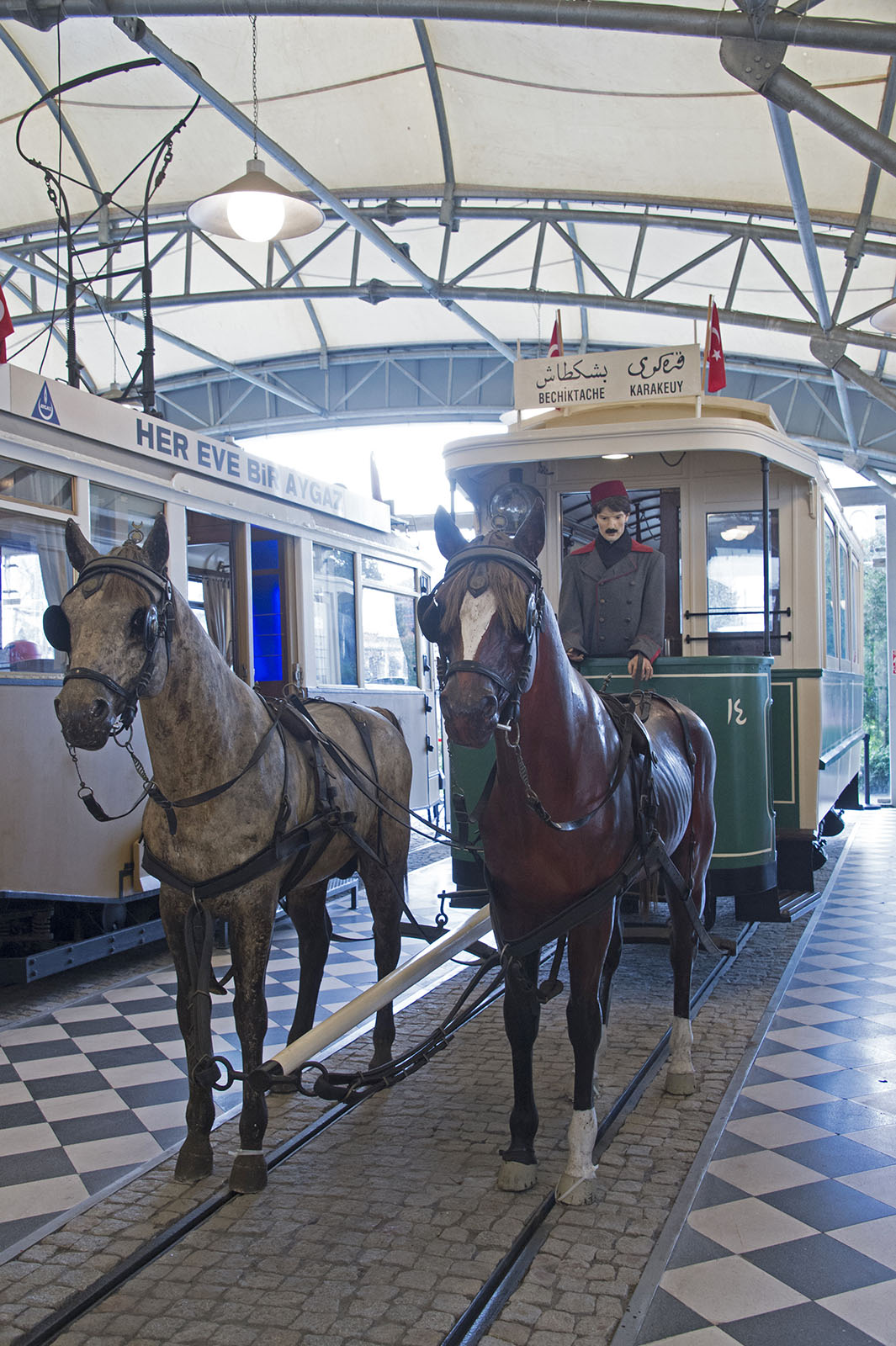
Horse-drawn tram of Istanbul (1872–1914)

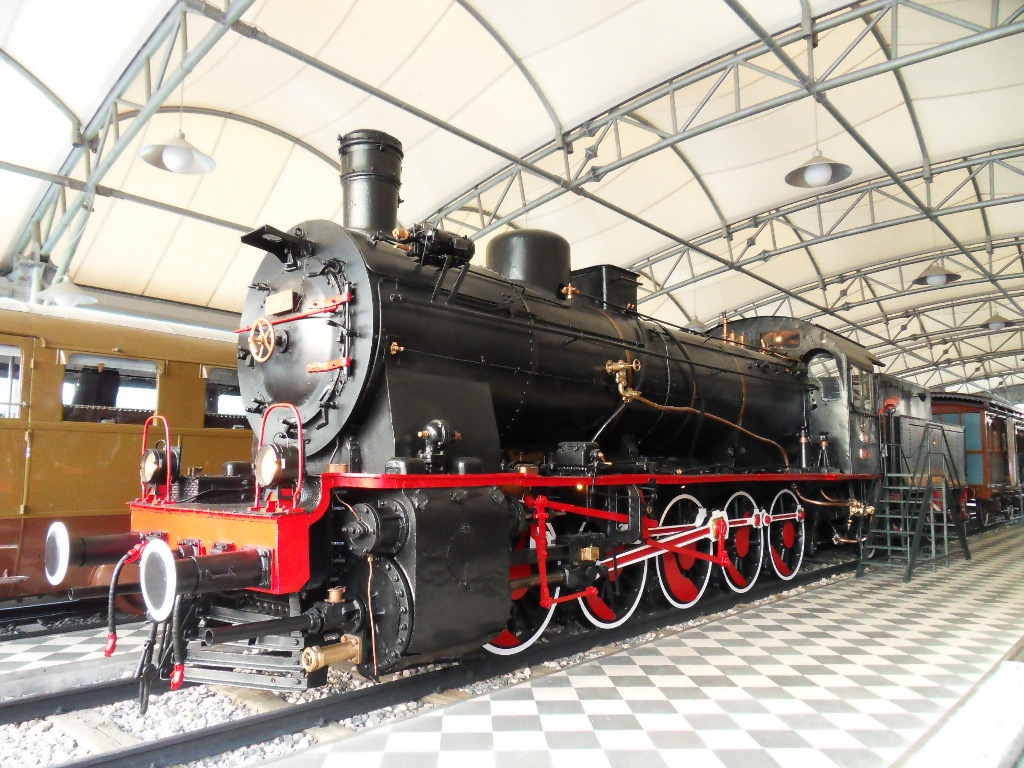
Borsig G10 locomotive (1912)

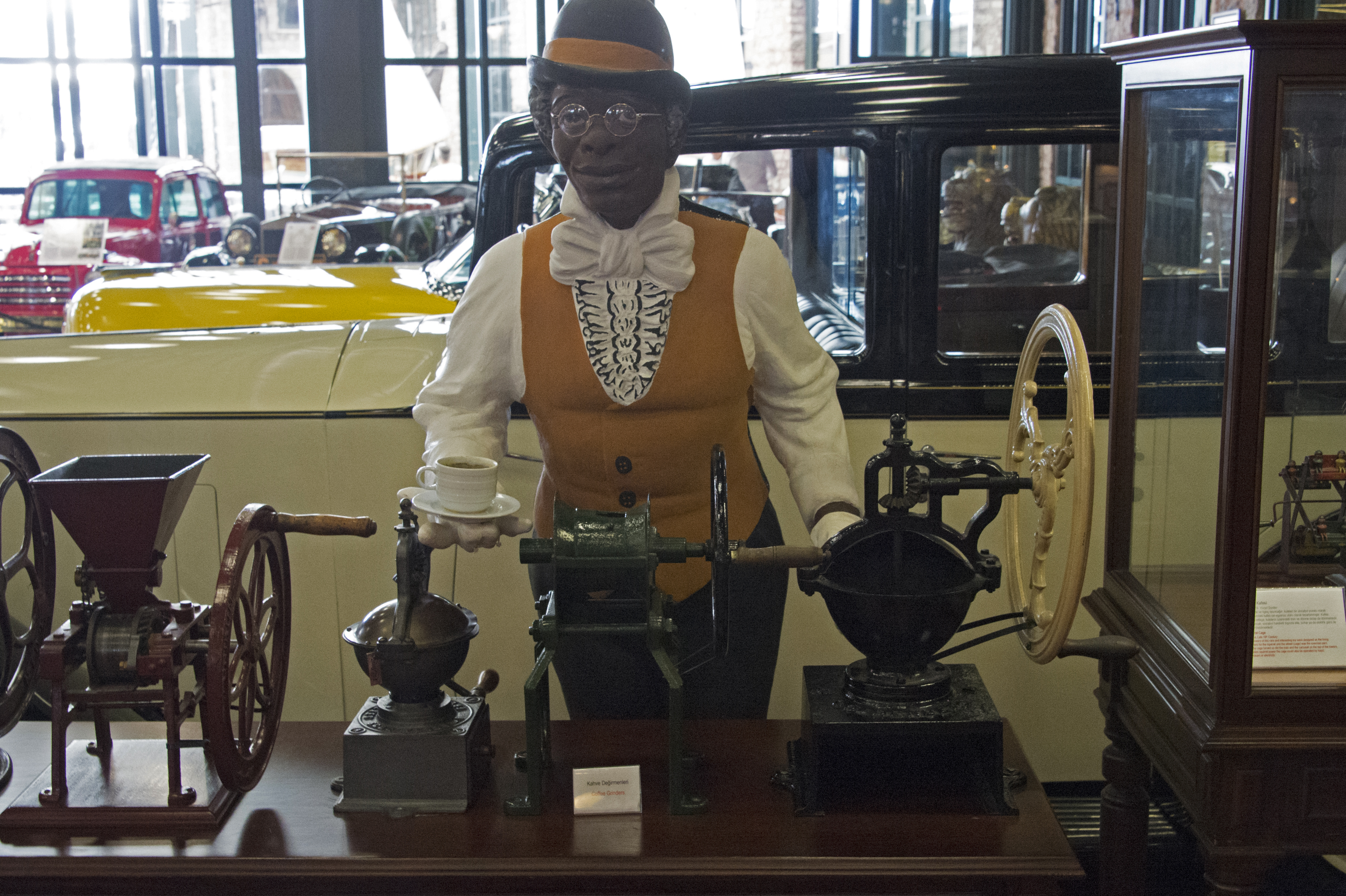
Coffee preparation machine

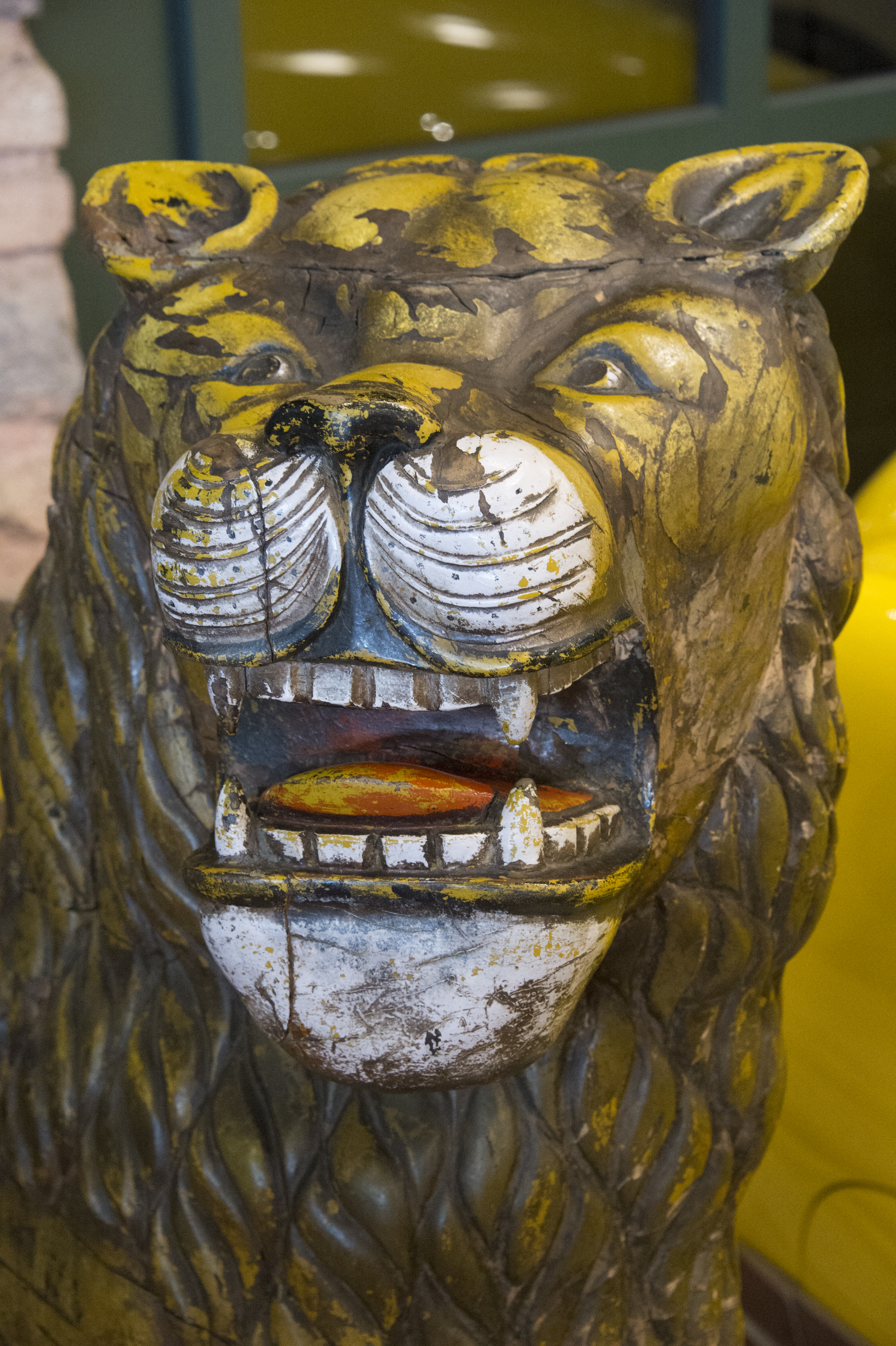
Istanbul Rahmi M. Koç Museum – Lion

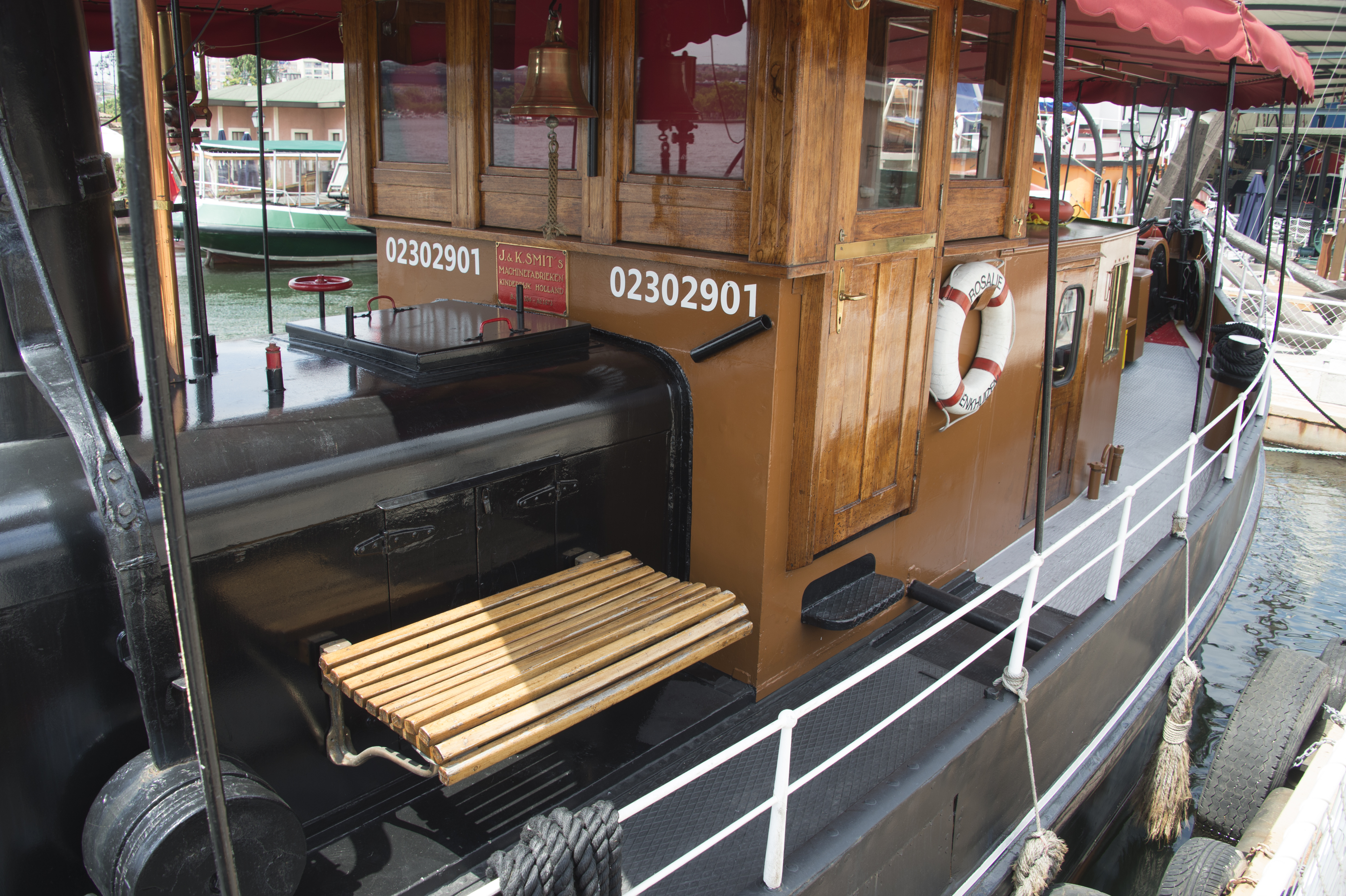
Istanbul Rahmi M. Koç Museum – Steam tug

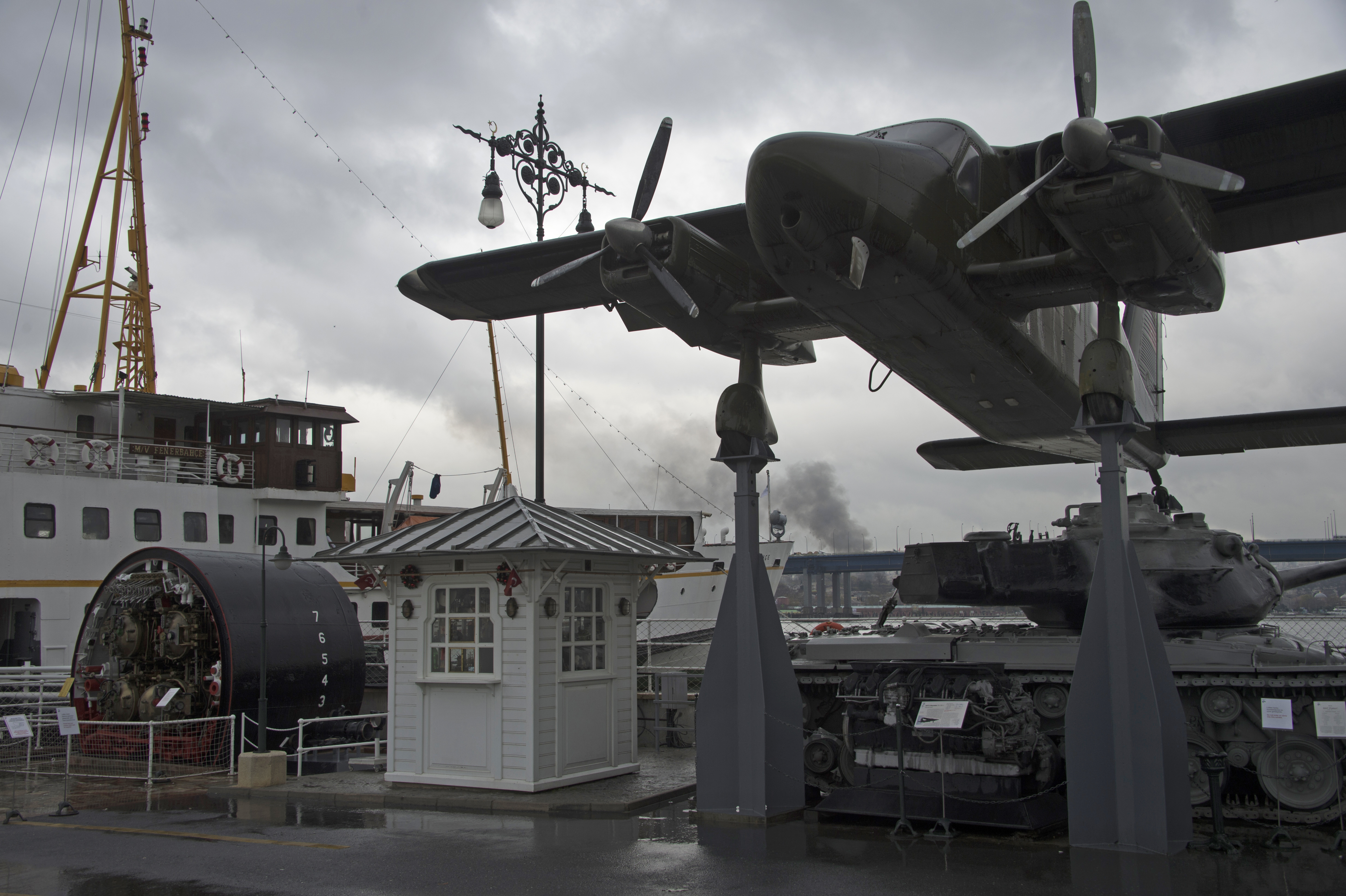
Istanbul Rahmi M. Koç Museum – Militaria

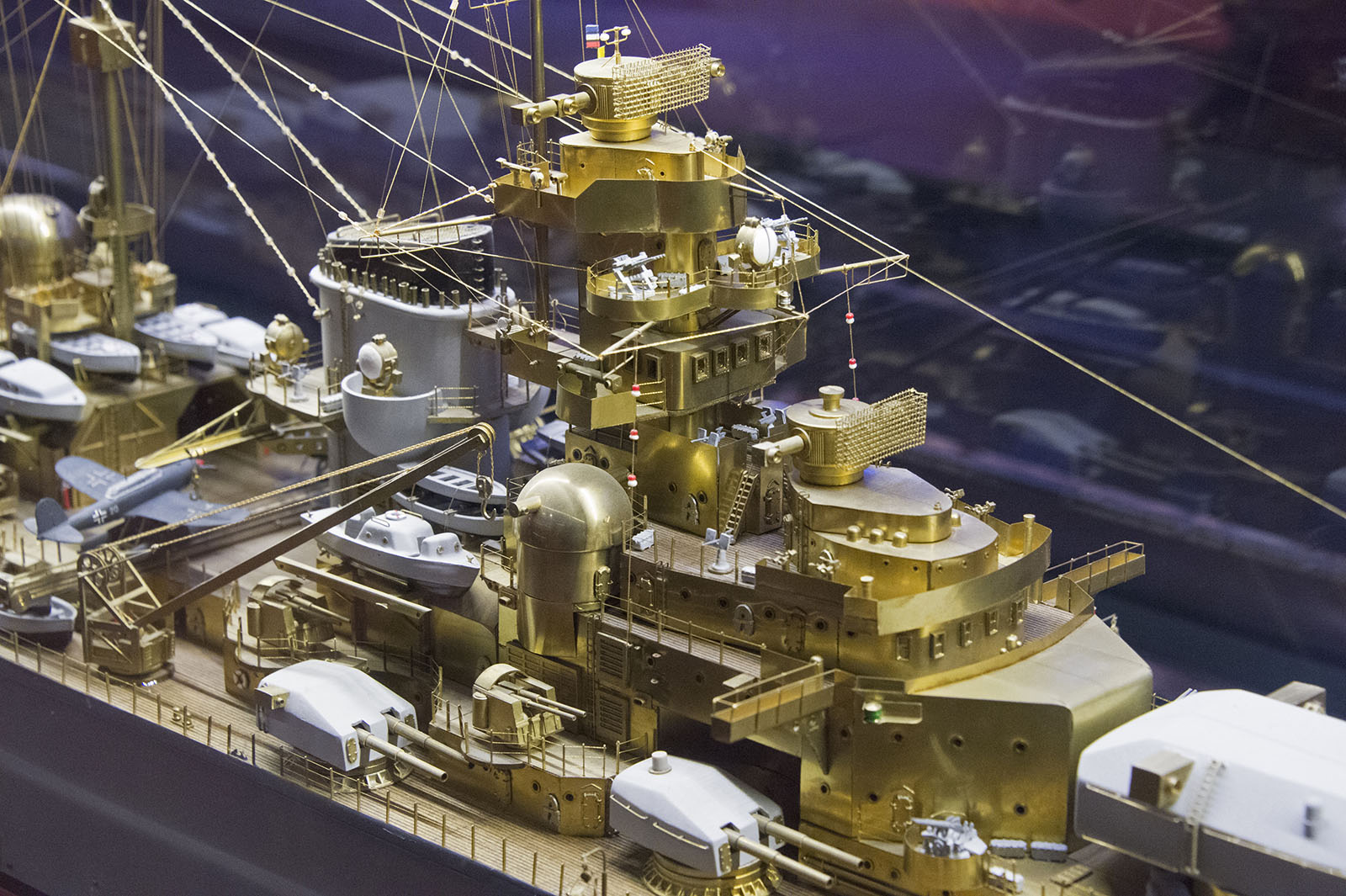
Model (1938) of German battleship Bismarck

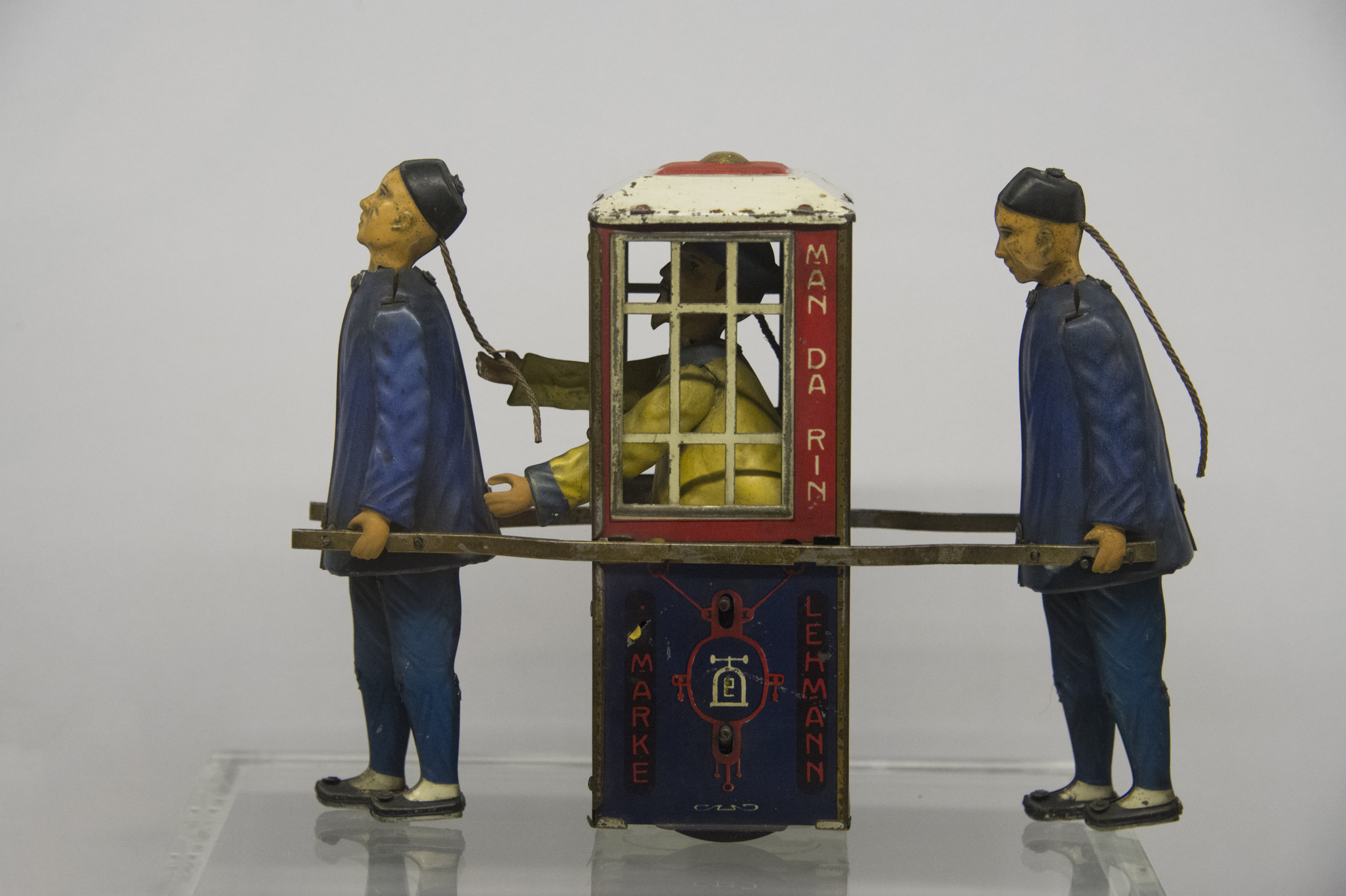
Istanbul Rahmi M. Koç Museum – Toy

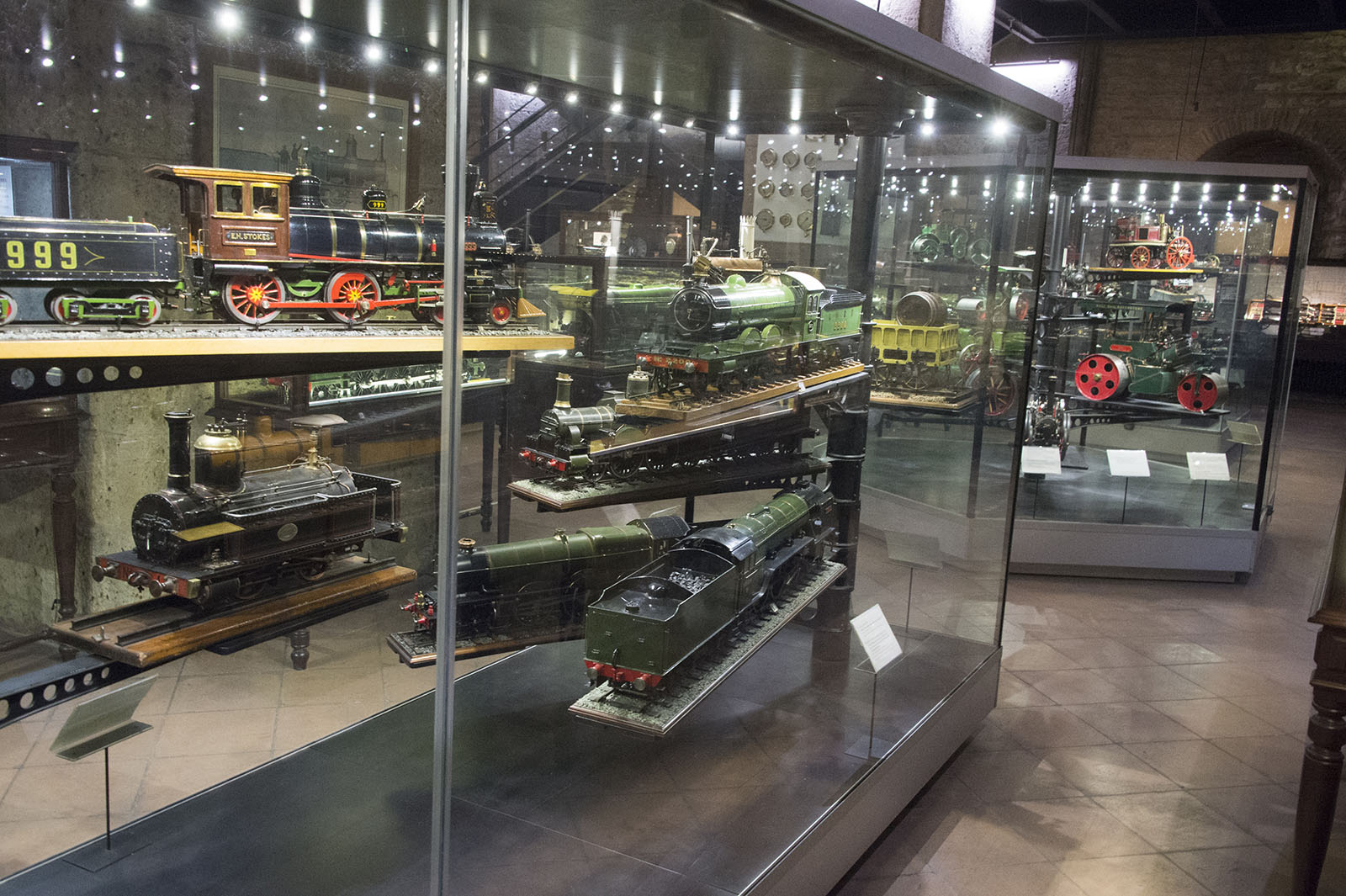
Istanbul Rahmi M. Koç Museum – Train models

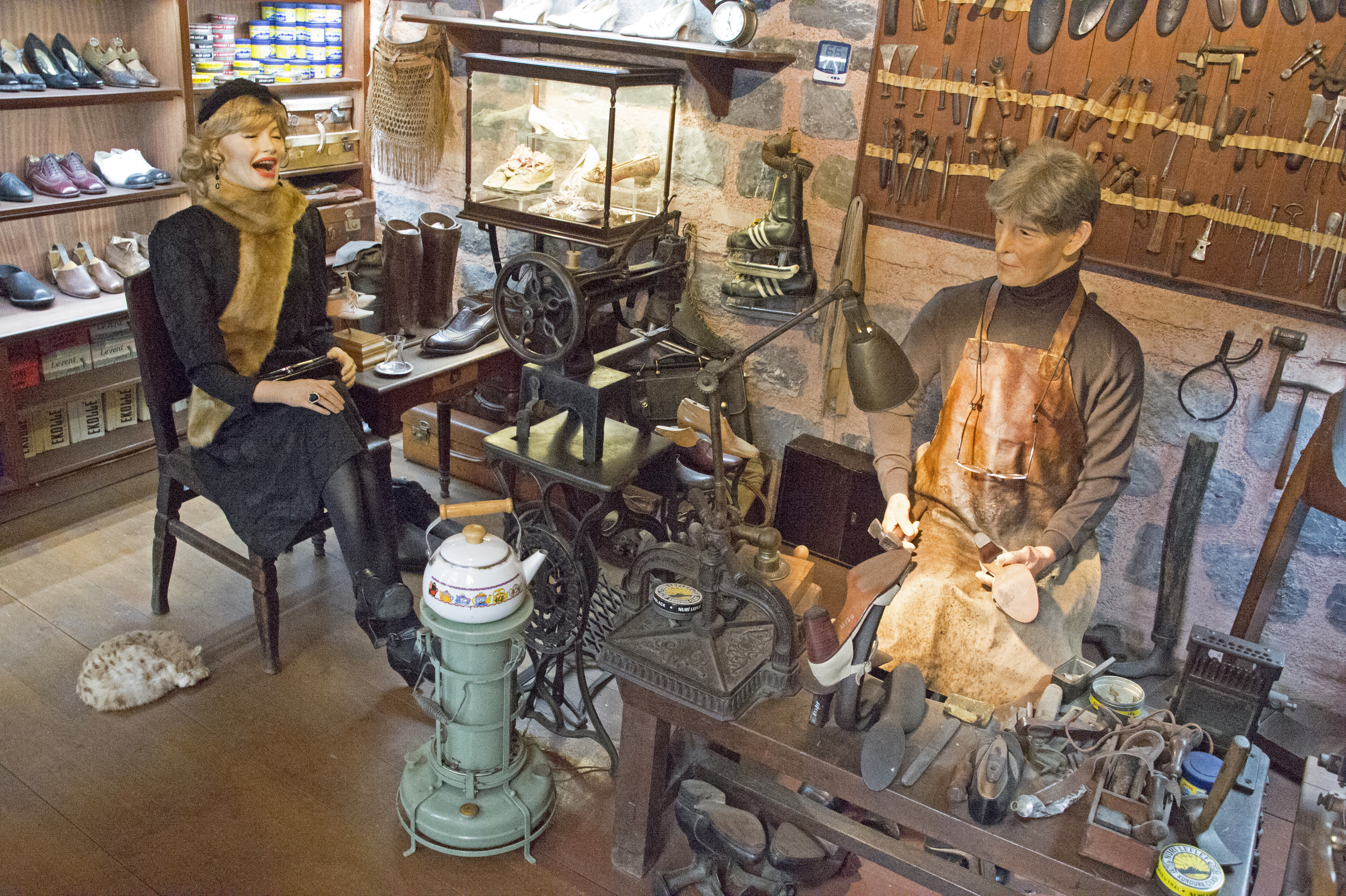
Istanbul Rahmi M. Koç Museum – Cobbler

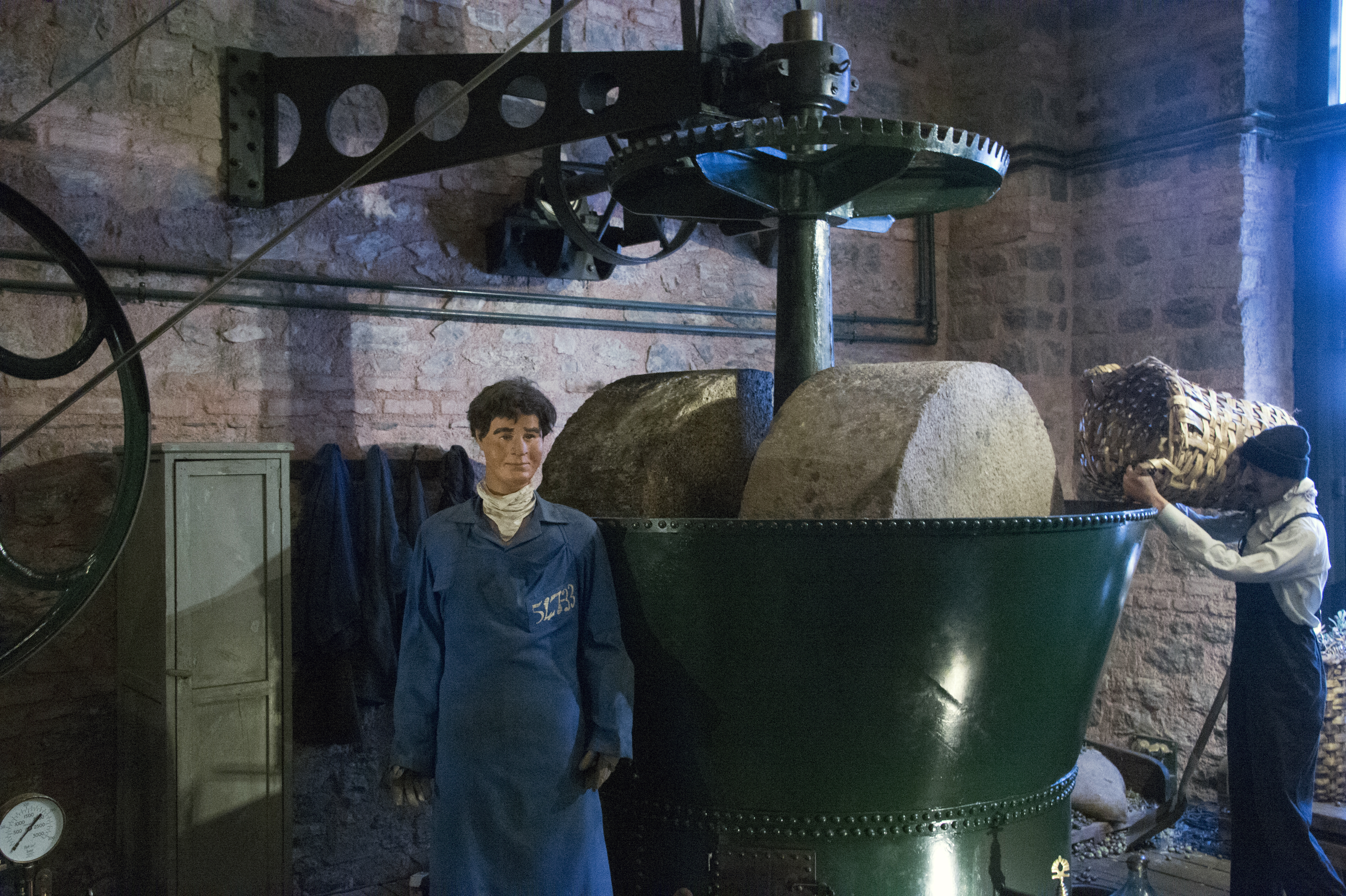
Istanbul Rahmi M. Koç Museum – Olive oil preparation

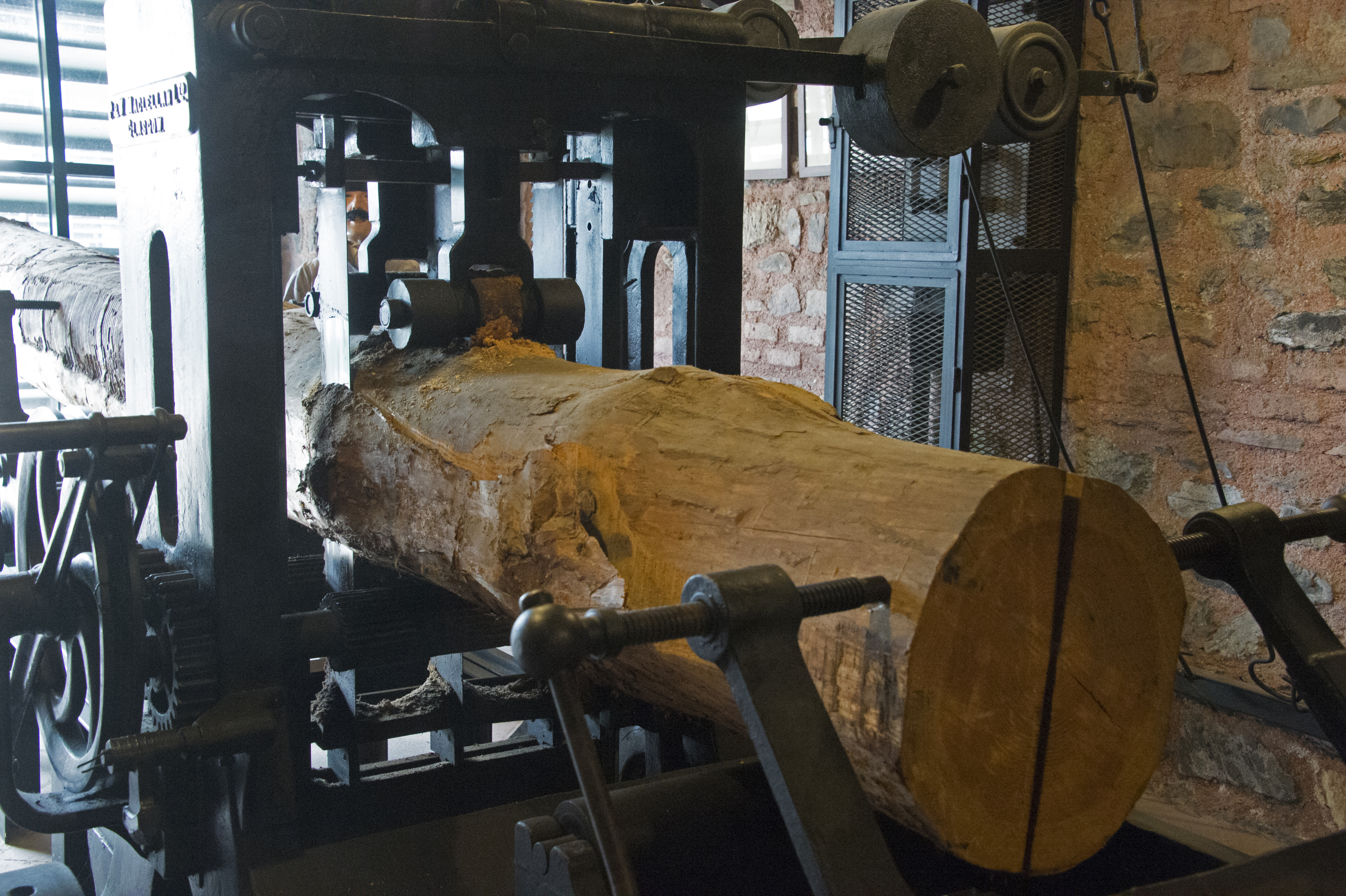
Istanbul Rahmi M. Koç Museum – Wood saw

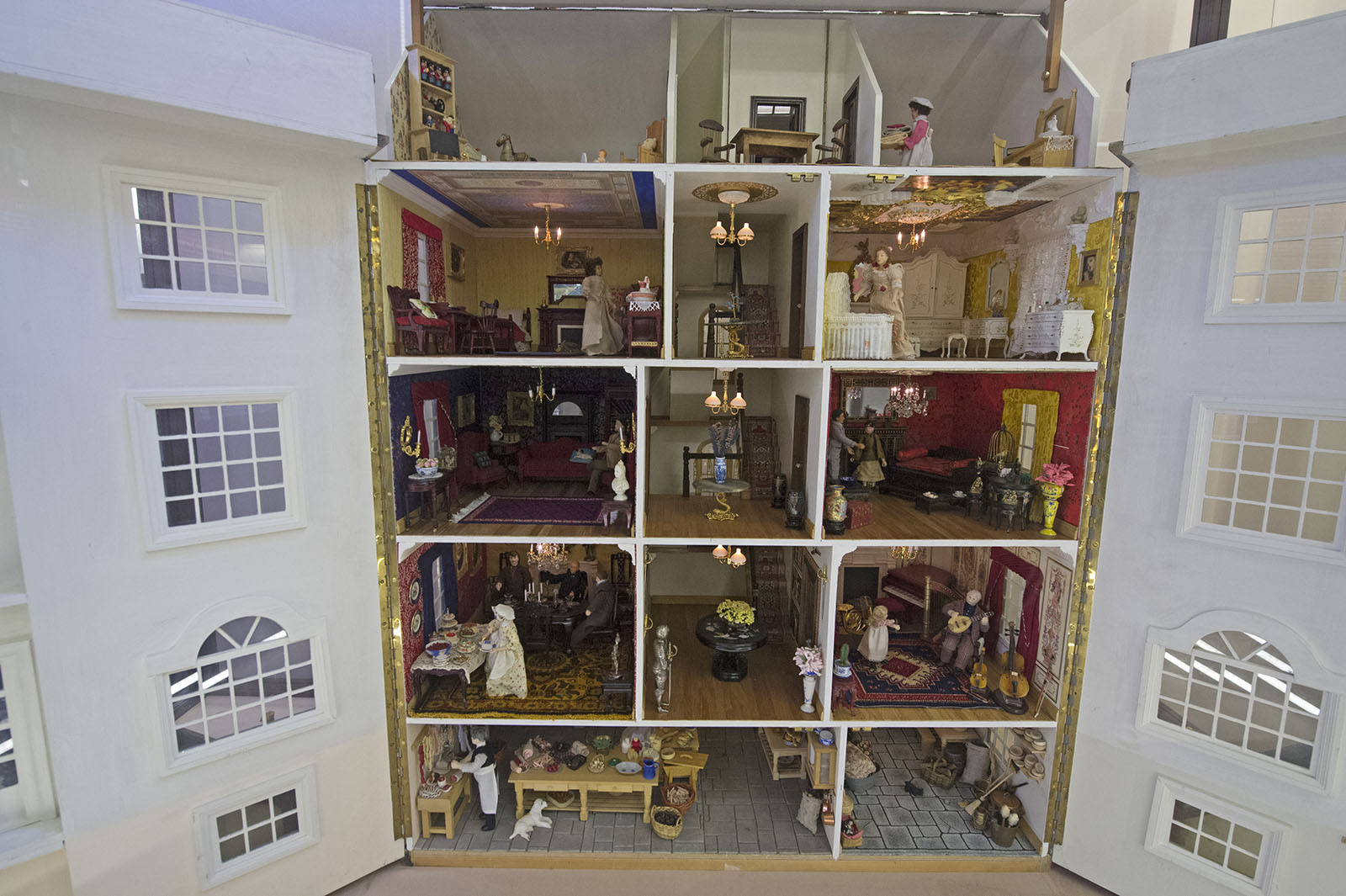
Istanbul Rahmi M. Koç Museum – Doll's house

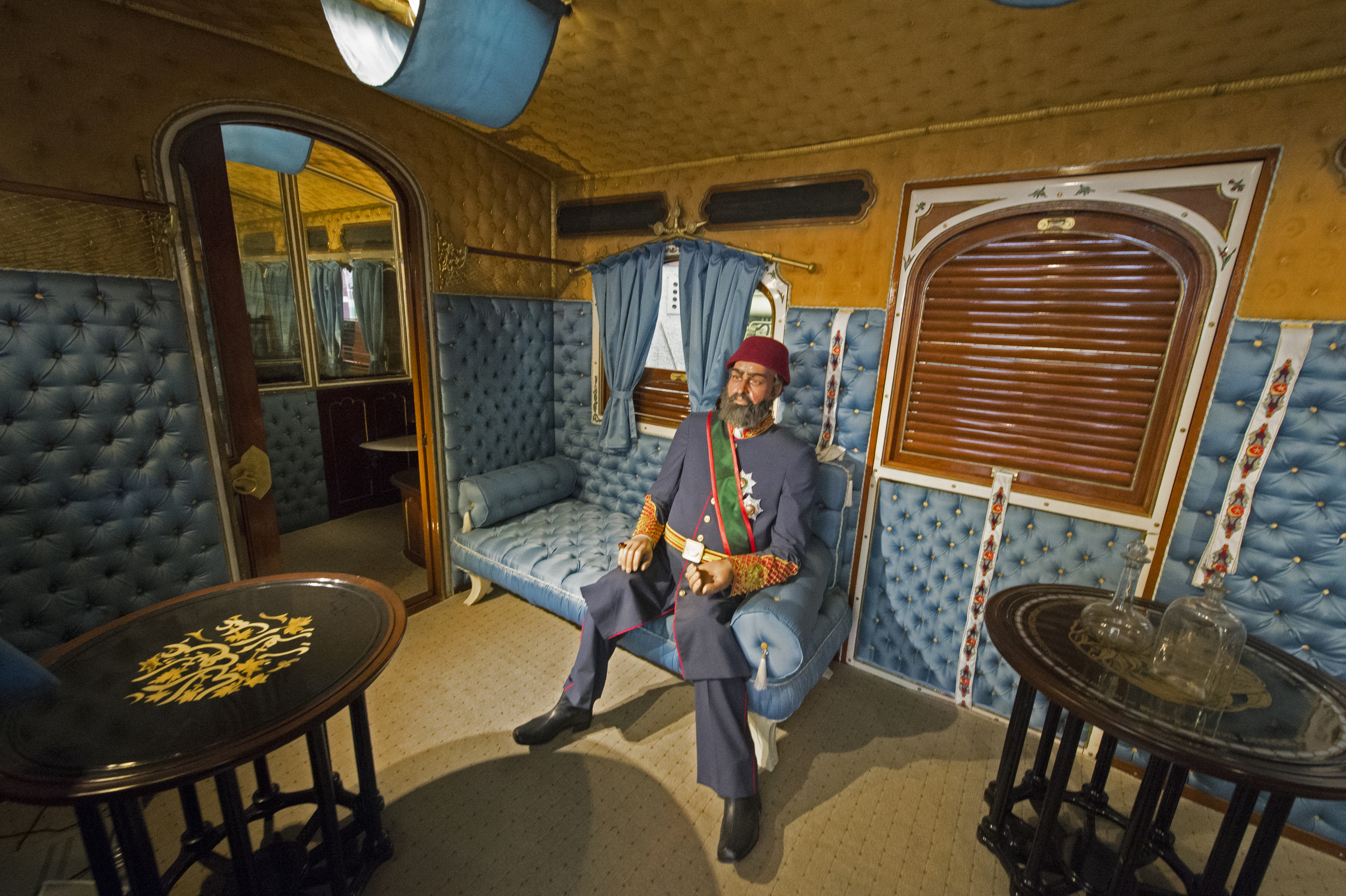
Imperial Coach used by Sultan Abdülaziz during his visit to Paris, London and Vienna in 1867

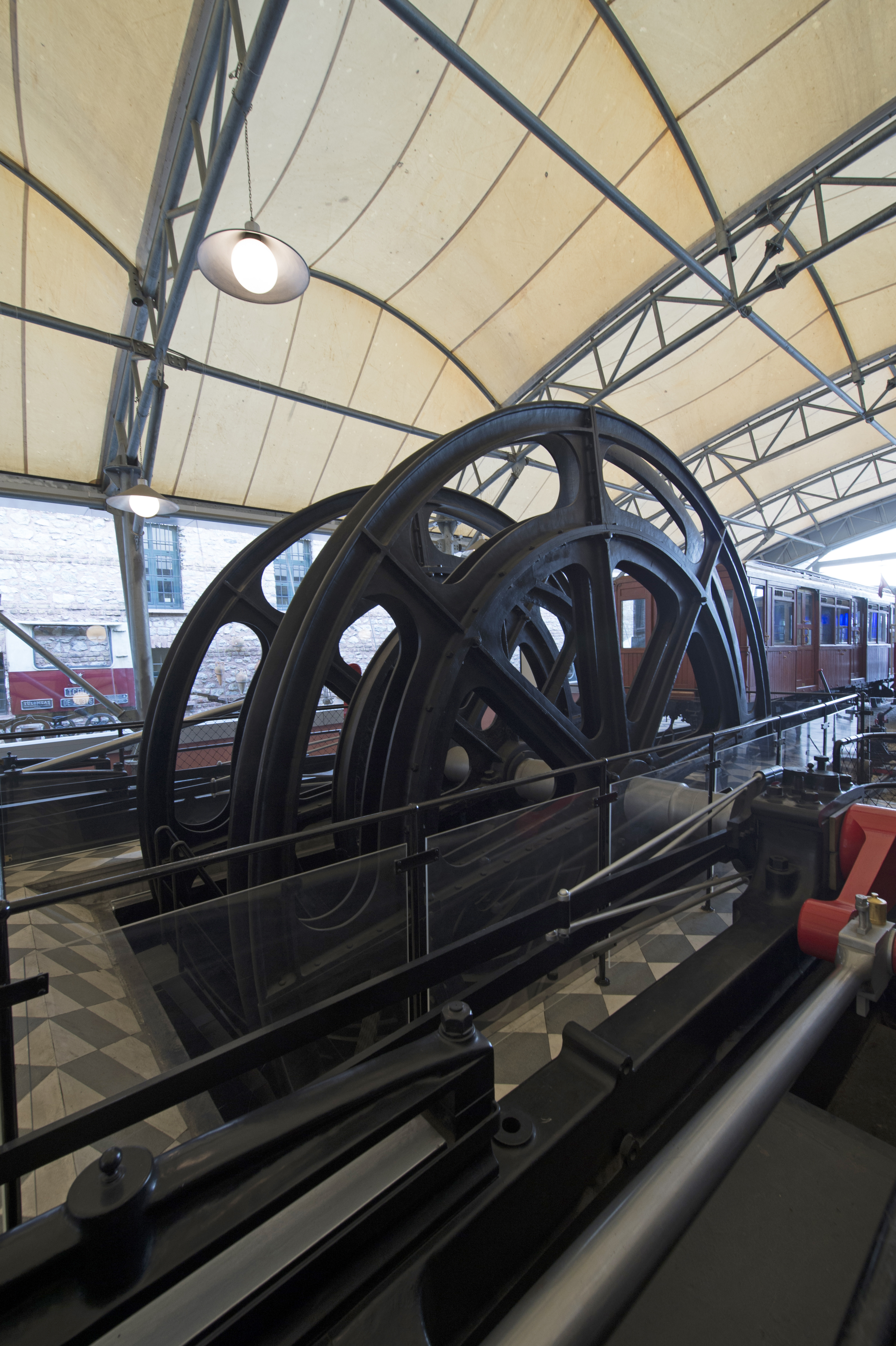
Tünel winders

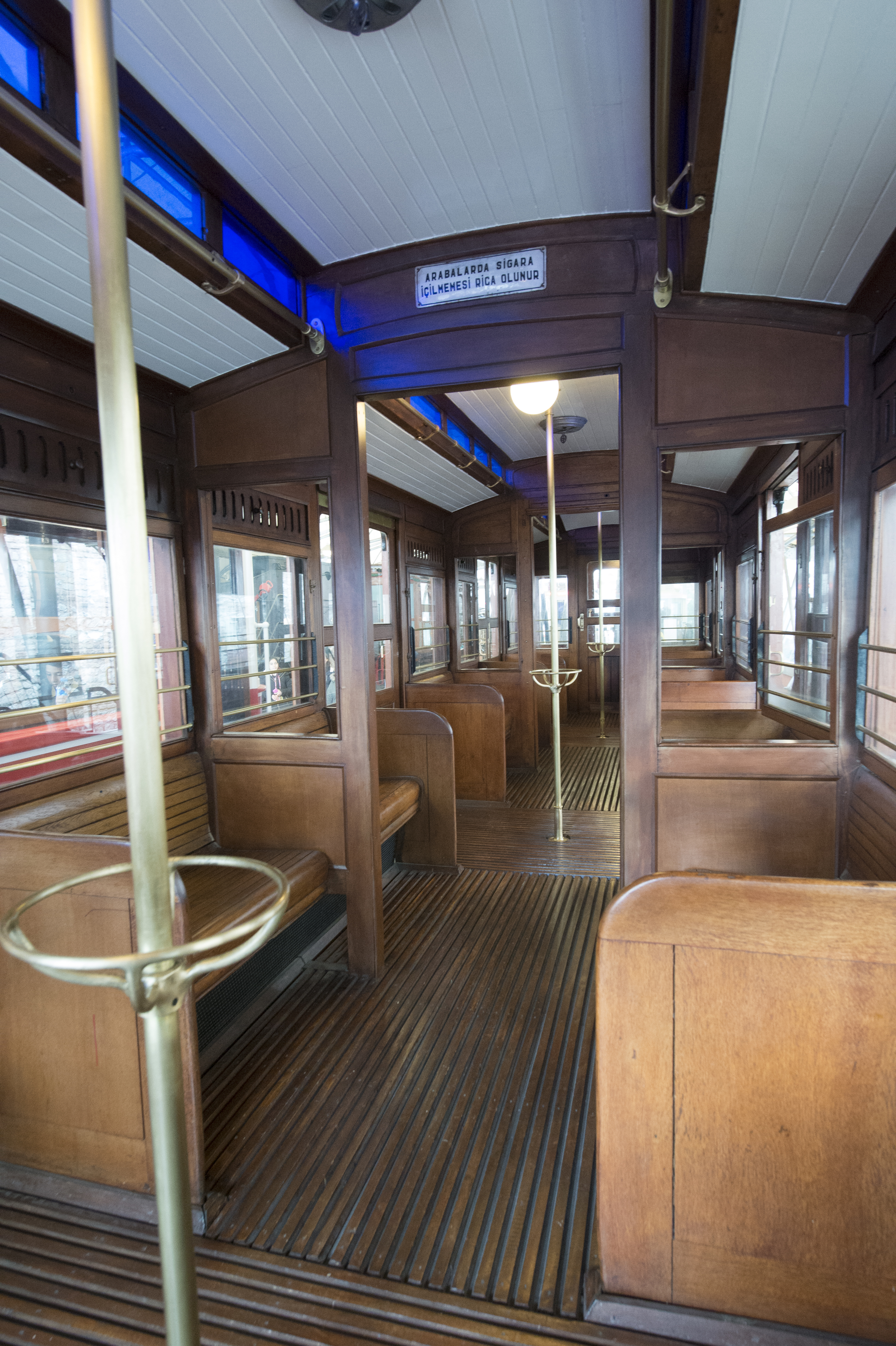
Tünel passenger wagon
