= Sadun Boro =

Turkish sailor and navigator

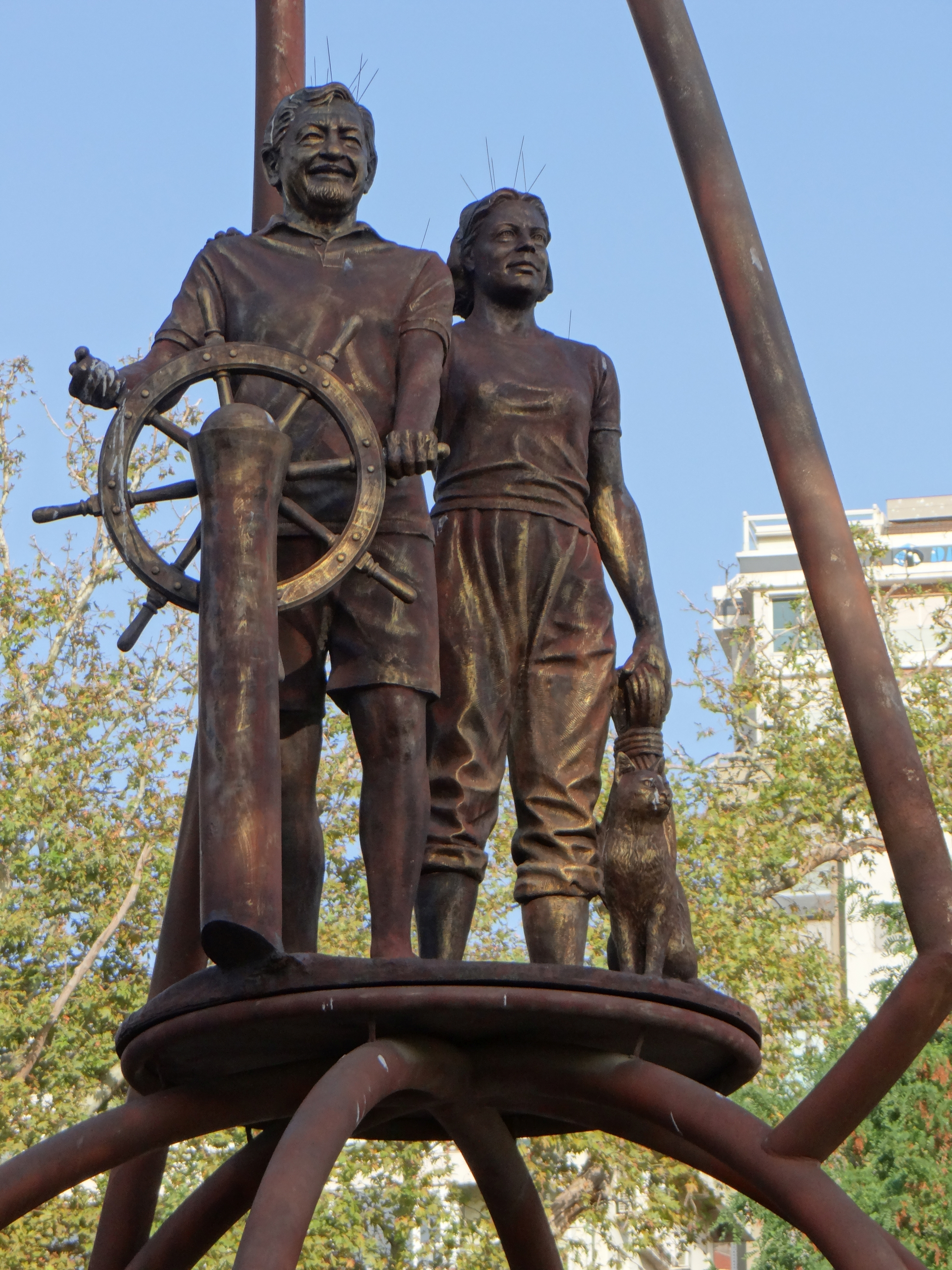
- Statue of Sadun and Oda Boro in Kalamış, Kadıköy, Istanbul
- Born: 1928; Istanbul, Turkey
- Died: 5 June 2015 (aged 87); Marmaris, Turkey
- Monuments: Monument of Global Circumnavigation in Kadıköy, Istanbul
- Education: University of Manchester
- Known for: First Turkish global circumnavigation
- Spouse: Oda Boro
- Children: 1 (daughter)

Sadun Boro (1928 – 5 June 2015) was a Turkish amateur sailor who was the first Turkish man to circumnavigate the globe by sailing.

== Early years ==
Sadun Boro was born in Istanbul, Turkey in 1928. He spent his childhood at Caddebostan neighborhood of Kadıköy, Istanbul, on the coast of Sea of Marmara. He changed his rowing boat with a sailboat as soon as he became a high school student.

He graduated from Galatasaray High School in 1948, and went to the United Kingdom to study textile engineering at University of Manchester Institute of Science and Technology.

In 1952, Boro made his first ocean voyage from British Islands to the Caribbean Islands on the 11 m (36 ft)-long sailboat Ling together with an Englishman. The story of his travel that lasted six months was published in serial format in the Turkish daily Cumhuriyet, and was compiled in his book titled Bir Hayalin Peşinde (literally: In Pursuit of a Dream) later in 2004.

== Circumnavigating the globe ==
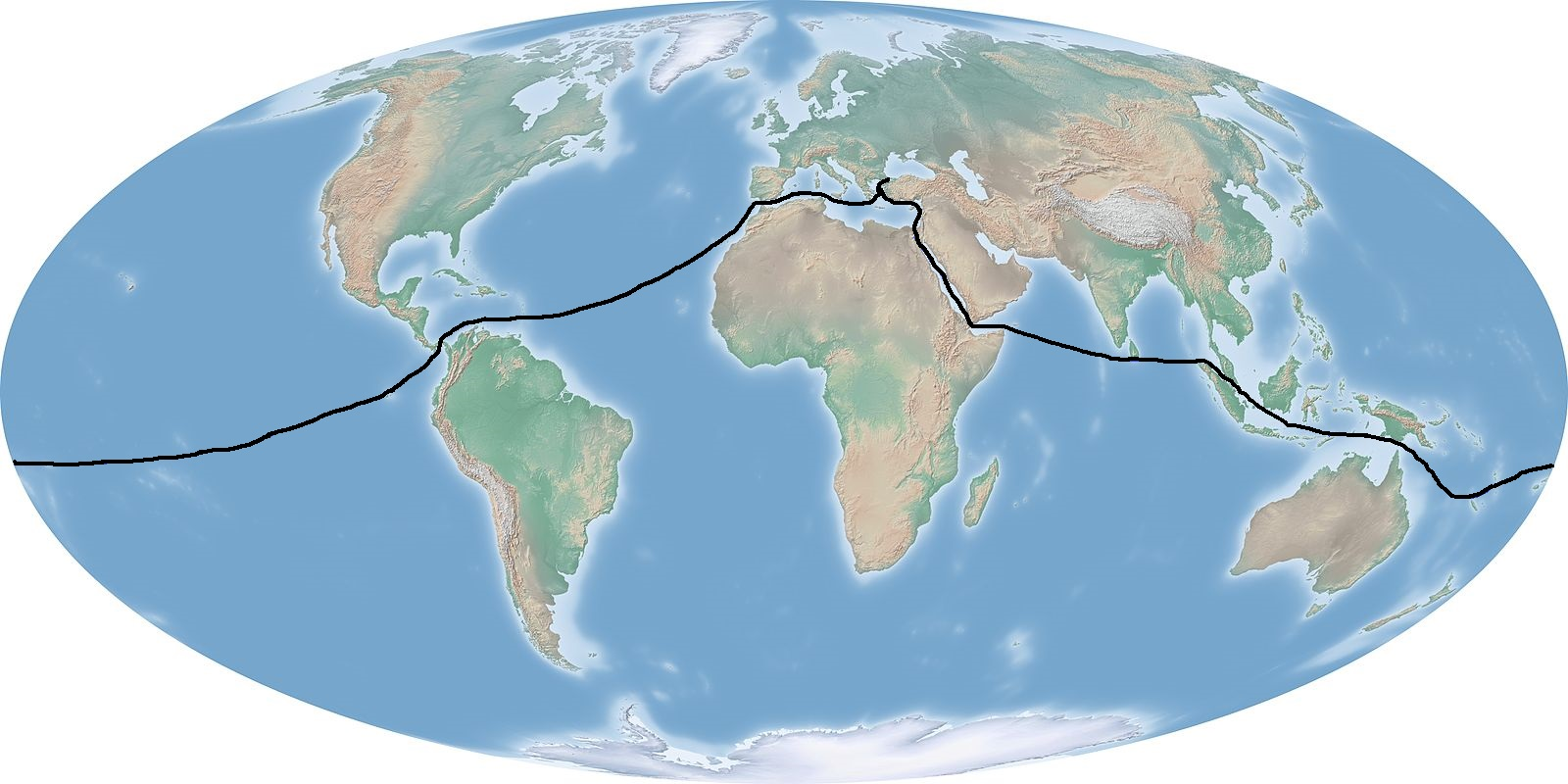
Route of Sadun Boro's global circumnavigation between 1965 and 1968.

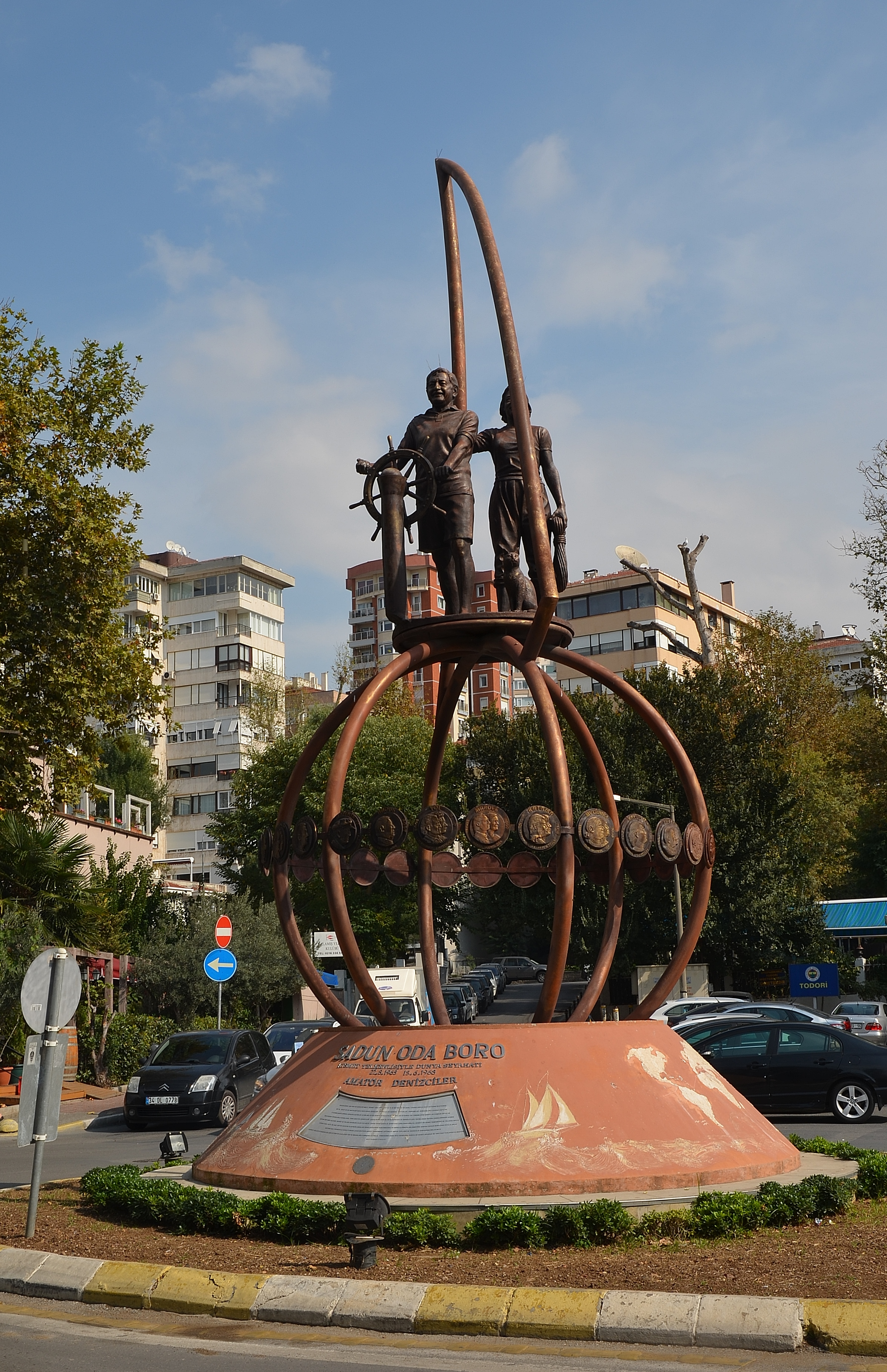
Monument of Global Circumnavigation of Sadun Boro and his wife Oda in front of the Kalamış Marina's main entrance at Kadıköy, Istanbul, Turkey.

His 10.5 m (34 ft)-long ketch was laid down at the workshop of Athar Beşpınar in Salacak neighborhood of Üsküdar, Istanbul in 1963, and named Kısmet (Turkish for "Destiny"). He manufactured the sail in the textile plant he was working at, in Çukurova, southern Turkey.

Boro began his westabout (east to west) voyage to circumnavigate the globe on 22 August 1965, accompanied by his German-born wife Oda Boro. He set sail from Istanbul, passed Strait of Gibraltar crossing the Mediterranean Sea and reached Canary Islands, where they took a housecat aboard and named it "Miço" (Turkish for "shipmate"). Crossing the Atlantic Ocean, he arrived in Barbados and Caribbean Islands. Passing through the Panama Canal, he sailed crossing Pacific Ocean to Galápagos Islands, Marquesas Islands, Tuamotu Archipelago, Tahiti, Society Islands, Tonga Islands, Fiji Islands, New Hebrides and New Guinea. His route went then through Torres Strait to Timor, Indonesia and Singapore. Crossing the Bay of Bengal, he was in Ceylon (today: Sri Lanka). He sailed then on Arabian Sea and Red Sea and then was carried by a truck from Eilat to Haifa. In the Mediterranean Sea again, his last stop before completing his globe circumnavigation was Israel.

On 15 June 1968, after 1,028 days of ocean voyage, he arrived in Istanbul, where he was welcomed by his mother, and cheered as a national hero. Becoming the first ever Turkish global circumnavigator, he paved the way for global circumnavigation of Turkish sailors.

The memories about his voyage around the world were published as newspaper serialization in the daily Hürriyet at that time, and were written down later in his popular book Pupa Yelken (Turkish for the point of sail run).

A monument was erected in front of the Kalamış Marina's main entrance in Kadıköy, Istanbul, featuring Boro at the boat's wheel of his sloop and his wife Oda standing next to him, both sailing on the globe.

== Later years ==
Between 1977 and 1979, Sadun Boro sailed with his wife and then-eight-year-old daughter Deniz to the Caribbean and the East Coast of the United States. After 1980, he settled down in Bodrum and Gökova, known for its idyllic coasts full of forests and turquoise sea.

He devoted himself to the protection of nature at the Turkish Riviera, in particular in Gökova, Göcek and Fethiye. Boro aimed to instil love for nature and sea to young people with his articles published in newspapers and journals. As a lover of Gökova, he had a mermaid statue erected with an inscription atop a rock in the middle of Okluk Bay. The inscription reads Boro's words as "This mermaid has traveled many seas and horizons to find the heaven that she dreamed of. She traveled continents, islands and bays, until she reached Gökova." His latest book, titled Vira Demir (Turkish for "Haul Up the Anchor"), is a guide for sailors.

Boro donated his sloop Kısmet, he sailed 46-year long about 150,000 nautical miles (170,000 mi; 280,000 km) with, to the Rahmi M. Koç Museum, a museum in Istanbul dedicated to the history of transport, industry and communications, which was founded by the wealthy businessman Rahmi Koç, who also circumnavigated the globe between 2004 and 2006.

Sadun Boro lived in Okluk Bay, Gökova onboard his catamaran named Son Bahar (Turkish for "Autumn" or "Last Spring").

== Illness and death ==
Sadun Boro was diagnosed with bladder cancer years prior to his death. He was first treated in Marmaris, where he lived, and then transferred to the American Hospital in Istanbul. However, he was airlifted by helicopter back to Muğla on 14 May 2015 as he wished to spend his rest of life on board of his sailboat.

At 9:15 hours local time on 5 June 2015, he died at age 87 in the intensive care unit of a hospital at Marmaris, where he was taken into three days before. His last will was to be buried under the pine, to which his sailboat is secured mooring at İngilizlimanı (literally: English Harbor) in Gökova. For its realization, a cabinet decision is necessary. He was interred in Karacasöğüt Cemetery in Marmaris following a memorial tour in the bays of the Turkish Riviera he admired on board of his catamaran Son Bahar accompanied by many boats and vessels of the Turkish Coast Guard and a frigate of the Turkish Navy.

He was survived by his wife Oda and his daughter Deniz (Turkish for "Sea").

== Works ==
- Boro, Sadun (November 2011). Bir Hayalin Peşinde : Yarım Asır Evvel Bir Atlantik Serüveni. Ege Yayınları. p. 200. ISBN 9789758070947.
- Boro, Sadun (2010). Pupa Yelken - Kısmet'in Dünya Seyahati (in Turkish). Istanbul: Denizler Kitabevi. p. 423. ISBN 978-975-807-1678.
- Boro, Sadun (2010). Vira Demir - İstanbul'dan İskenderun'a Denizciler (in Turkish). Istanbul: Ege Yayınları. p. 524. ISBN 978-994-426-4242.

== Other Turkish global circumnavigators ==
A chronological list of Turkish sailors who circumnavigated the globe following Sadun Boro.

As of 10 April 2015

Sailor	Accompanied by	Sailboat	Date
Tanıl Tuncel	Annette	Kelebek	1986-91
Haluk Karamanoğlu	Family	Deriska	1988-93
Eralp Akkoyunlu		Yosun	1988-95
Zuhal Atasoy	Osman Atasoy	Uzaklar	1992-97
Erkan Gürsoy		Barış	1993-95
Göran Clarmo	Ayfer Er	Cantana III	1993-98
Mehmet Selis	Elaine	Zarafet	1995-2009
Selçuk Karamanoğlu		Turquoise	2000-03
Alim Sür	Hattaya Sür	My Chance	2003-08
Rahmi Koç		Nazenin IV	2004-06
Ayça Kirişçioğlu	Levent Kirişçioğlu	Yol	2004-07
Ekrem İnözü		Anouk	2004-07
Hakan Öge	Sophie Hunter	Mardek	2004-07
Turkan Yöney	Kerem Tayla	Katama	2005-08
Özkan Gülkaynak		Kayıtsız III	2006-09
Cumhur Gökova	Mayisa Gökova	Gökova	2010-12
Haldun Karagöz		Amanin	2012-14
