= Çengelhan Rahmi M. Koç Museum =

- Çengelhan Rahmi M. Koç Müzesi
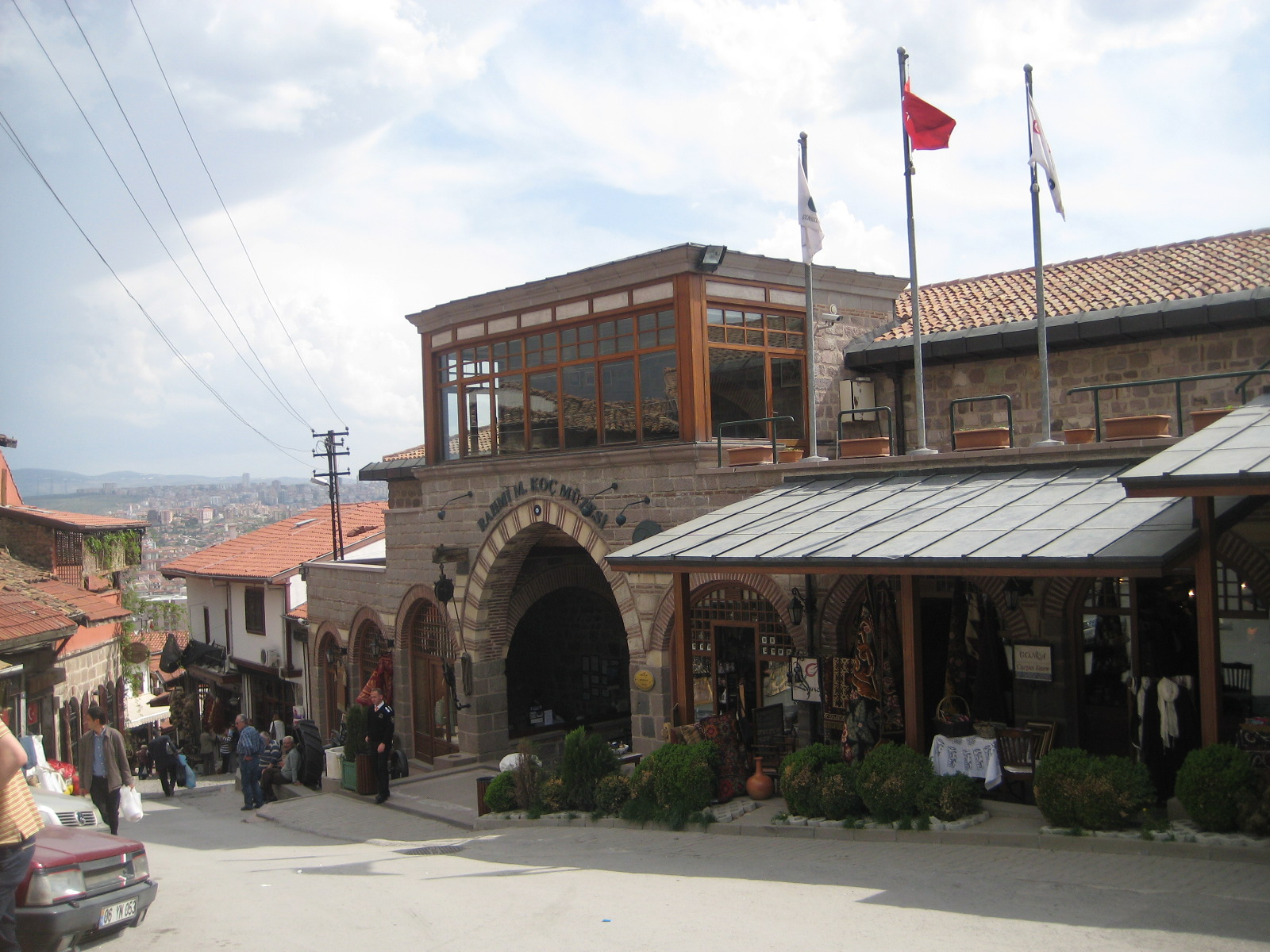

- Location within Turkey
- Established: 2005
- Location: Ankara, Turkey
- Coordinates: 39°56′15″N 32°59′50″E
- Type: Technology museum
- Director: Tunç Koyuncu
- President: Rahmi M. Koç
- Website: www.rmk-museum.org

The Çengelhan Rahmi M. Koç Museum (Turkish: Çengelhan Rahmi M. Koç Müzesi) is a technology museum in Ankara, Turkey.

== Geography ==
The museum is in the old quarters of Ankara known as historic Atpazarı (literally: Horse market), facing the Ankara Citadel. It is at an altitude of 950 metres (3,120 ft) slightly higher than the rest of the city.

== History ==
The museum is situated in a historic inn (Turkish: han), called Çengelhan (literally: Hooks inn). According to an inscription on the main gate, the inn was built in 1523 during the reign of Ottoman Sultan Suleyman I. Later, it was used as a warehouse for mohair, which was a speciality of Ankara. During the Republican era, it was owned by the General Directorate of Foundations of Turkey. In 2003, it was rented to industrialist, Rahmi M. Koç, to be used as a museum. After a restoration period, it was opened in 2005.

== The museum ==
The lower floor is reserved for a carpet gallery, agricultural machinery and pharmaceutical exhibits. Machines, medicine, everyday life tools and road transport vehicles are exhibited on the ground floor, along with a brasserie (café). The upper floor contains exhibits of rail transport items, toys, and instruments for communications, science, maritime and navigation. There are also sections about Mustafa Kemal Atatürk, the founder of modern Turkey; Vehbi Koç, Rahmi Koç's father and one of the first industrialists of Turkey, and Ankara city.

== Gallery ==
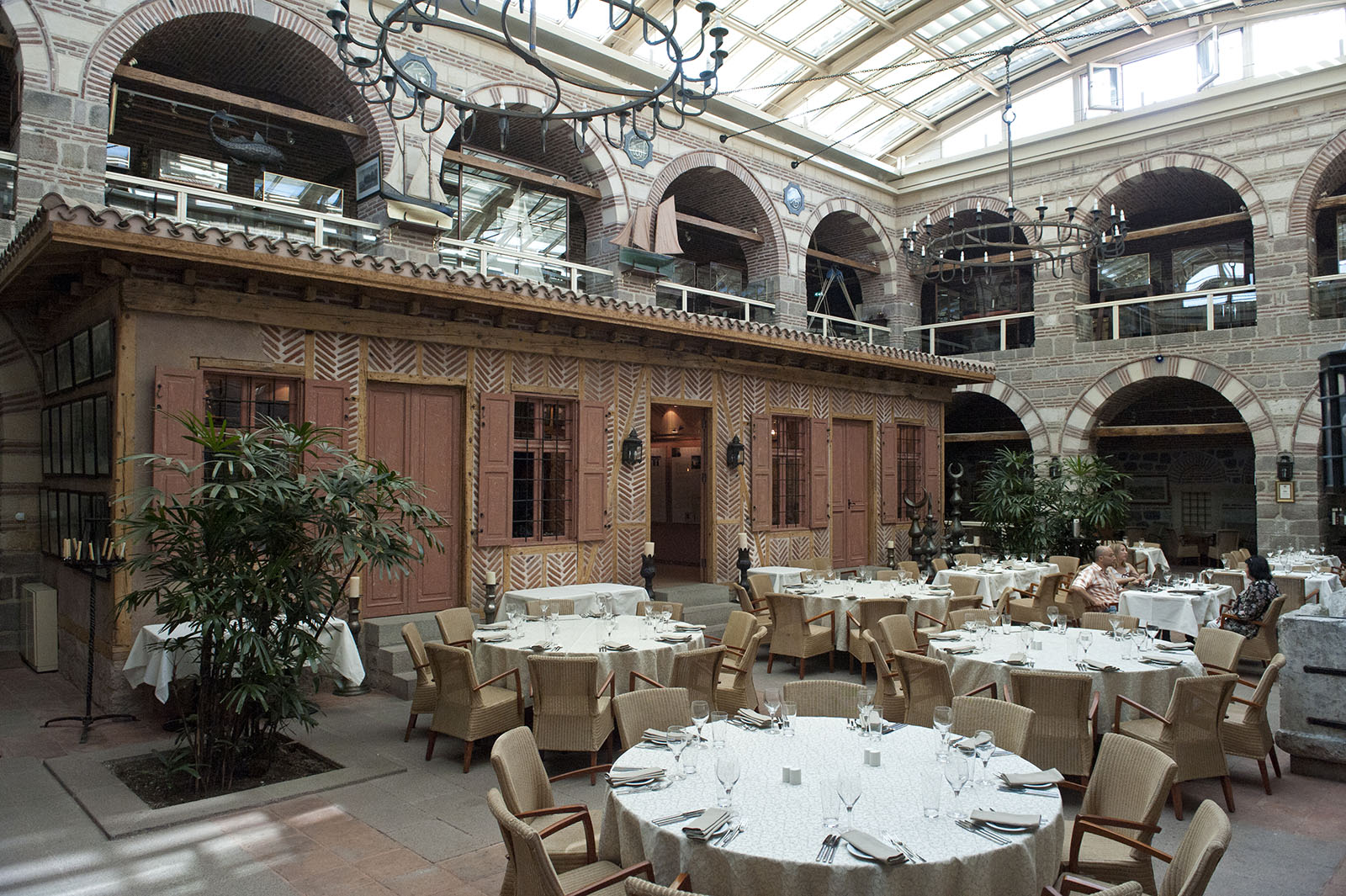
Çengelhan Rahmi M. Koç Museum Central hall

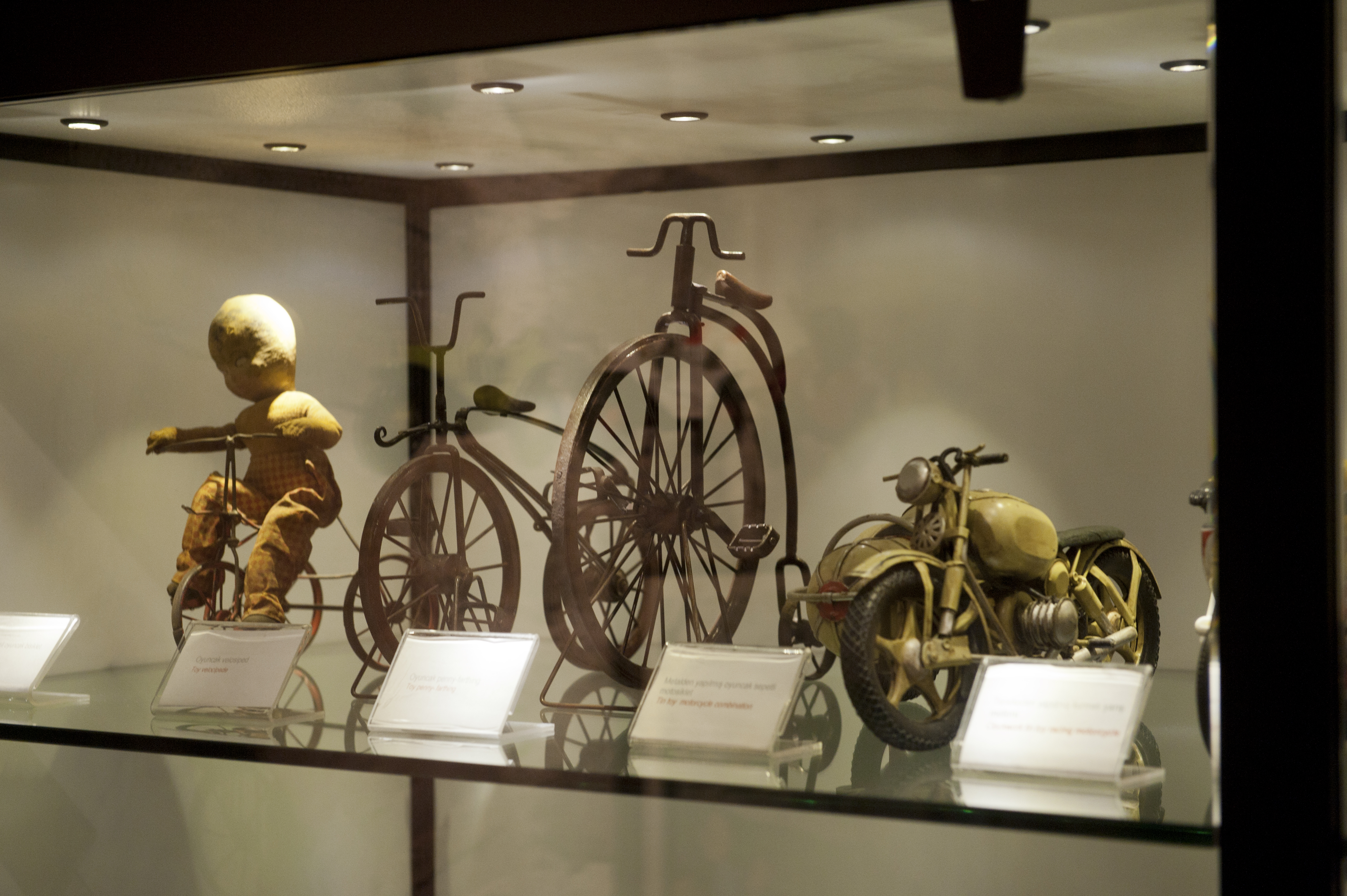
Çengelhan Rahmi M. Koç Museum Exhibits

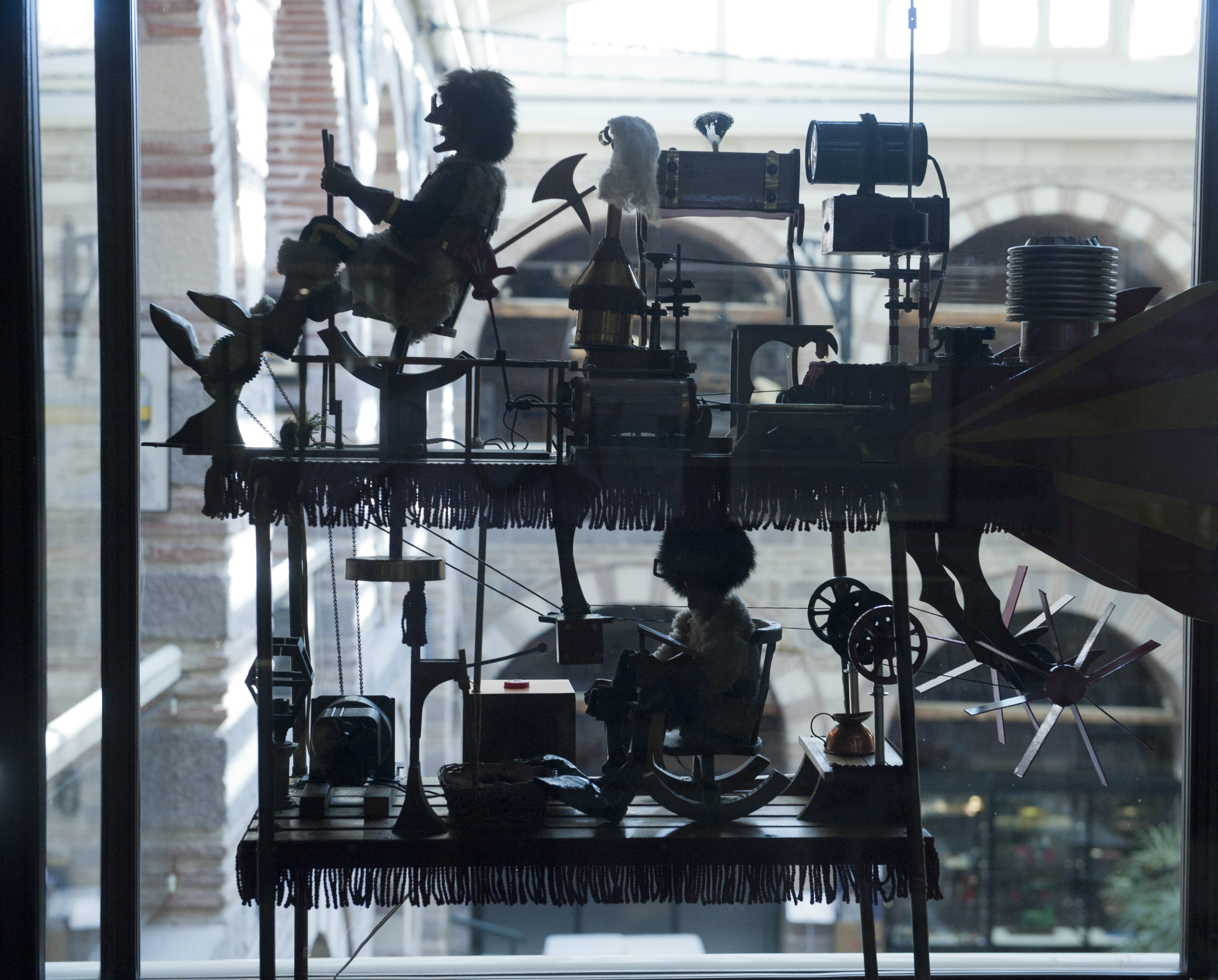
Çengelhan Rahmi M. Koç Museum Exhibits

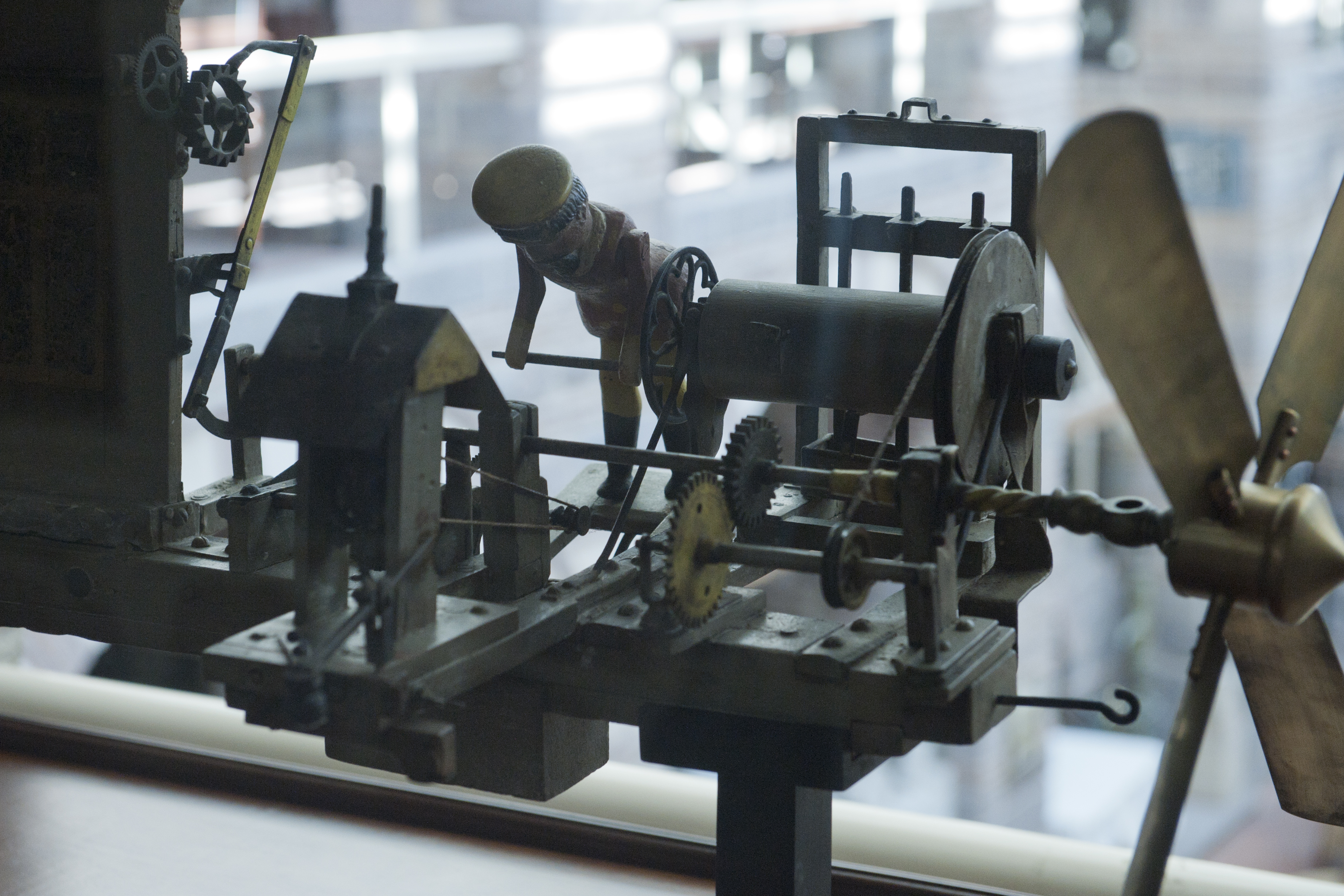
Çengelhan Rahmi M. Koç Museum Exhibits
