= List of Chinese provincial-level divisions by life expectancy =

China at the 1st level of administrative division is divided to 22 provinces, 5 autonomous regions, 4 direct-administered municipalities, and 2 special administrative regions (plus 1 claimed province).

According to estimation of the United Nations, in 2023 life expectancy in China was 77.95 years (75.20 for male, 80.93 for female). This is 0.25 years less than it was in 2022.

Estimation of the World Bank Group for 2023 is exactly the same: 77.95 years total (75.20 for male, 80.93 for female).

According to estimation of the WHO for 2019, at that year life expectancy in China was 77.31 years (74.58 years for male and 80.36 years for female).
And healthy life expectancy was 68.45 years (66.99 years for male and 70.08 years for female).

Life expectancy in China is several years lower than in neighboring South Korea, Japan and Singapore, but several years higher than in Vietnam, Kazakhstan, North Korea, Russia and India.

== Global Data Lab (2019–2022) ==
This is a list of the first-level administrative divisions of the People's Republic of China (P.R.C.) in order of their life expectancy in 2019–2022, including all provinces and autonomous regions, but not including special administrative regions.

Life Expectancy by Chinese Administrative Division in 2019. 85.0 and Over 82.0-84.99 79.0-81.99 76.0-78.99 73.0-75.99 70.0-72.99 69.99 and Below

region	2019				2019 →2021	2021	2021 →2022	2022				2019 →2022
region	overall	male	female	F Δ M	2019 →2021	overall	2021 →2022	overall	male	female	F Δ M	2019 →2022
China on average	77.97	75.30	80.82	5.52	0.24	78.21	0.38	78.59	75.96	81.34	5.38	0.62
Shanghai	82.38	80.11	84.68	4.57	0.17	82.55	0.40	82.95	80.75	85.14	4.39	0.57
Beijing	82.32	80.16	84.43	4.27	0.17	82.49	0.40	82.89	80.79	84.89	4.10	0.57
Tianjin	81.11	79.07	83.16	4.09	0.19	81.30	0.39	81.69	79.67	83.66	3.99	0.58
Zhejiang	80.00	77.78	82.39	4.61	0.19	80.19	0.38	80.57	78.44	82.84	4.40	0.57
Jiangsu	79.11	76.72	81.57	4.85	0.21	79.32	0.38	79.70	77.36	82.09	4.73	0.59
Guangdong	79.08	76.42	81.98	5.56	0.23	79.31	0.38	79.69	77.09	82.48	5.39	0.61
Shandong	78.96	76.16	81.85	5.69	0.22	79.18	0.38	79.56	76.80	82.37	5.57	0.60
Hainan	78.83	75.51	82.60	7.09	0.22	79.05	0.38	79.43	76.17	83.10	6.93	0.60
Liaoning	78.50	75.72	81.32	5.60	0.18	78.68	0.38	79.06	76.30	81.80	5.50	0.56
Chongqing	78.33	75.54	81.38	5.84	0.23	78.56	0.38	78.94	76.20	81.90	5.70	0.61
Fujian	78.27	75.50	81.31	5.81	0.22	78.49	0.38	78.87	76.15	81.81	5.66	0.60
Jilin	78.24	75.42	81.15	5.73	0.17	78.41	0.38	78.79	75.96	81.66	5.70	0.55
Heilongjiang	78.08	75.10	81.21	6.11	0.17	78.25	0.38	78.63	75.67	81.68	6.01	0.55
Guangxi	77.82	74.30	81.73	7.43	0.24	78.06	0.37	78.43	74.97	82.24	7.27	0.61
Hubei	77.74	75.37	80.26	4.89	0.26	78.00	0.37	78.37	76.07	80.78	4.71	0.63
Anhui	77.73	75.18	80.48	5.30	0.23	77.96	0.37	78.33	75.86	80.97	5.11	0.60
Shanxi	77.66	75.31	80.20	4.89	0.25	77.91	0.37	78.28	75.98	80.72	4.74	0.62
Hunan	77.62	75.00	80.47	5.47	0.26	77.88	0.37	78.25	75.70	81.00	5.30	0.63
Shaanxi	77.54	75.26	79.94	4.68	0.26	77.80	0.37	78.17	75.93	80.49	4.56	0.63
Sichuan	77.54	74.68	80.64	5.96	0.25	77.79	0.37	78.16	75.34	81.18	5.84	0.62
Hebei	77.53	74.90	80.26	5.36	0.22	77.75	0.37	78.12	75.53	80.77	5.24	0.59
Jiangxi	77.36	74.71	80.22	5.51	0.28	77.64	0.37	78.01	75.41	80.77	5.36	0.65
Henan	77.35	74.26	80.56	6.30	0.25	77.60	0.37	77.97	74.92	81.09	6.17	0.62
Inner Mongolia	77.30	74.63	80.18	5.55	0.26	77.56	0.37	77.93	75.31	80.70	5.39	0.63
Ningxia	76.31	74.48	78.18	3.70	0.27	76.58	0.37	76.95	75.22	78.65	3.43	0.64
Xinjiang	75.37	73.27	77.63	4.36	0.28	75.65	0.36	76.01	73.99	78.14	4.15	0.64
Gansu	75.35	73.28	77.52	4.24	0.29	75.64	0.36	76.00	73.97	78.10	4.13	0.65
Guizhou	74.84	71.67	78.29	6.62	0.36	75.20	0.36	75.56	72.41	78.96	6.55	0.72
Yunnan	73.62	70.54	77.08	6.54	0.40	74.02	0.36	74.38	71.30	77.79	6.49	0.76
Qinghai	73.61	71.31	76.04	4.73	0.35	73.96	0.35	74.31	72.04	76.67	4.63	0.70
Tibet	71.84	69.83	74.32	4.49	0.35	72.19	0.35	72.54	70.58	74.99	4.41	0.70

== Chinese Center for Disease Control and Prevention (2019) ==
Life expectancy in Chinese regions in 2019 according to an article in the journal CCDC Weekly published by CCDC:

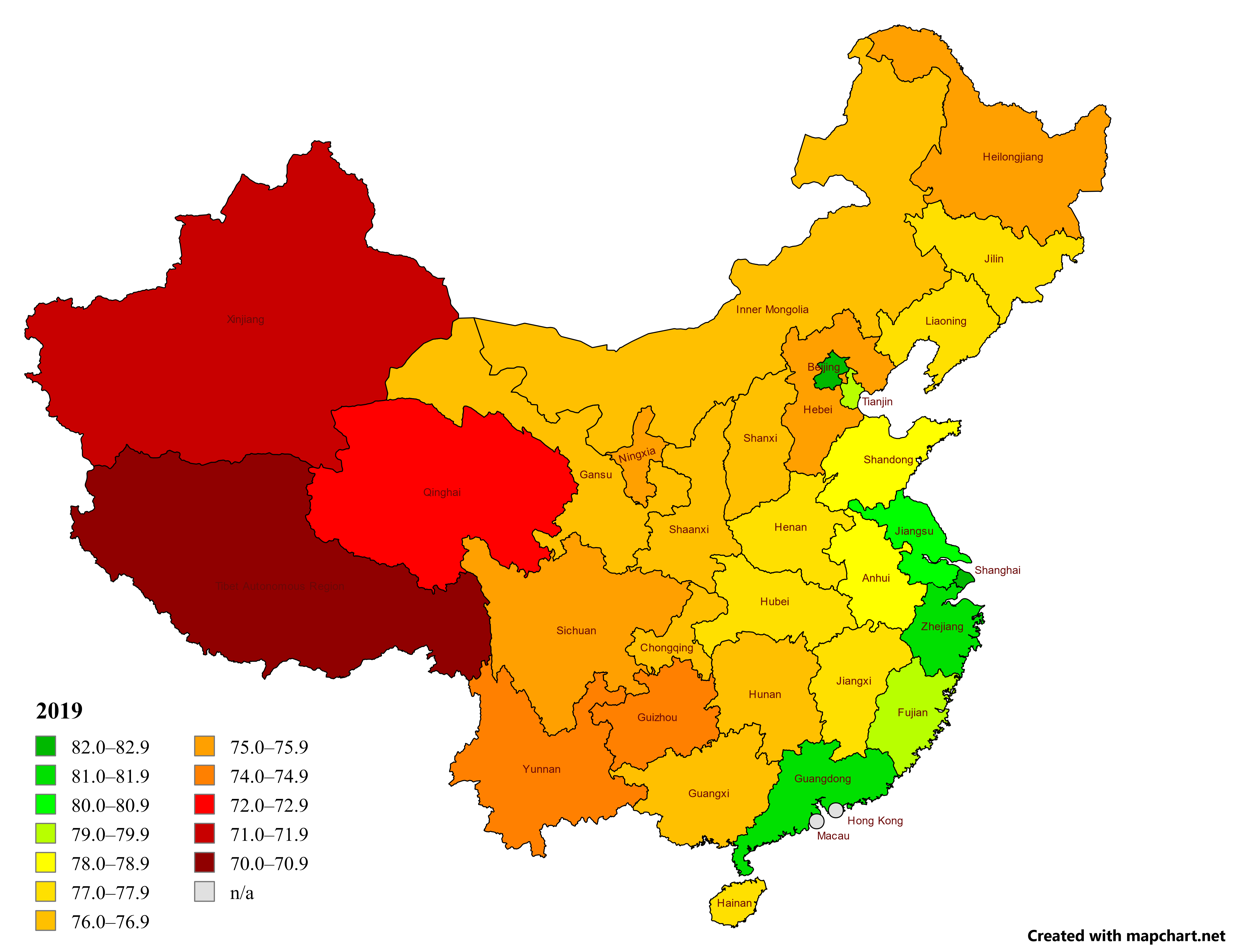
Life expectancy in Chinese regions in 2019

region	overall	male	female	sex gap
China	77.6	74.7	80.7	6.0
Shanghai	82.7	80.3	85.0	4.7
Beijing	82.7	79.6	85.9	6.3
Zhejiang	81.5	78.8	84.5	5.7
Guangdong	81.1	77.8	84.7	6.9
Jiangsu	80.8	77.9	83.8	5.9
Fujian	79.7	76.6	83.1	6.5
Tianjin	79.5	76.8	82.7	5.9
Shandong	78.7	75.7	81.9	6.2
Anhui	78.0	75.3	81.1	5.8
Jiangxi	77.6	74.8	80.6	5.8
Hubei	77.5	75.0	80.3	5.3
Henan	77.5	74.4	80.7	6.3
Liaoning	77.2	73.8	81.0	7.2
Jilin	77.1	75.8	78.4	2.6
Hainan	77.0	74.6	79.7	5.1
Shaanxi	76.7	74.4	79.4	5.0
Hunan	76.6	73.6	80.1	6.5
Chongqing	76.5	73.8	79.5	5.7
Shanxi	76.4	73.9	79.3	5.4
Inner Mongolia	76.3	73.5	79.7	6.2
Gansu	76.1	73.6	78.9	5.3
Guangxi	76.1	72.6	80.2	7.6
Ningxia	75.9	73.4	78.6	5.2
Hebei	75.7	72.6	79.1	6.5
Heilongjiang	75.5	72.5	79.0	6.5
Sichuan	75.5	72.5	79.0	6.5
Guizhou	74.8	72.1	77.8	5.7
Yunnan	74.2	71.1	77.9	6.8
Qinghai	72.1	70.1	74.4	4.3
Xinjiang	71.9	70.0	74.2	4.2
Tibet	70.1	67.6	72.9	5.3

== World Bank Group (2023) ==
Life expectancy in the special administrative regions of China according to the World Bank Group:

World Bank Group (2023)
Countries and territories	2023				Historical data											recovery from COVID-19: 2019→2023
Countries and territories	All	Male	Female	Sex gap	2014	2014 →2019	2019	2019 →2020	2020	2020 →2021	2021	2021 →2022	2022	2022 →2023	2023	recovery from COVID-19: 2019→2023
Hong Kong SAR, China	85.25	82.54	88.09	5.55	83.94	1.22	85.16	0.34	85.50	0.04	85.53	−1.87	83.66	1.59	85.25	0.09
Macao SAR, China	83.18	80.40	86.10	5.70	83.02	0.91	83.93	0.20	84.13	−0.40	83.73	−0.65	83.08	0.10	83.18	−0.75
China on average	77.95	75.20	80.93	5.73	76.71	1.23	77.94	0.08	78.02	0.10	78.12	0.08	78.20	−0.25	77.95	0.01

== Charts ==
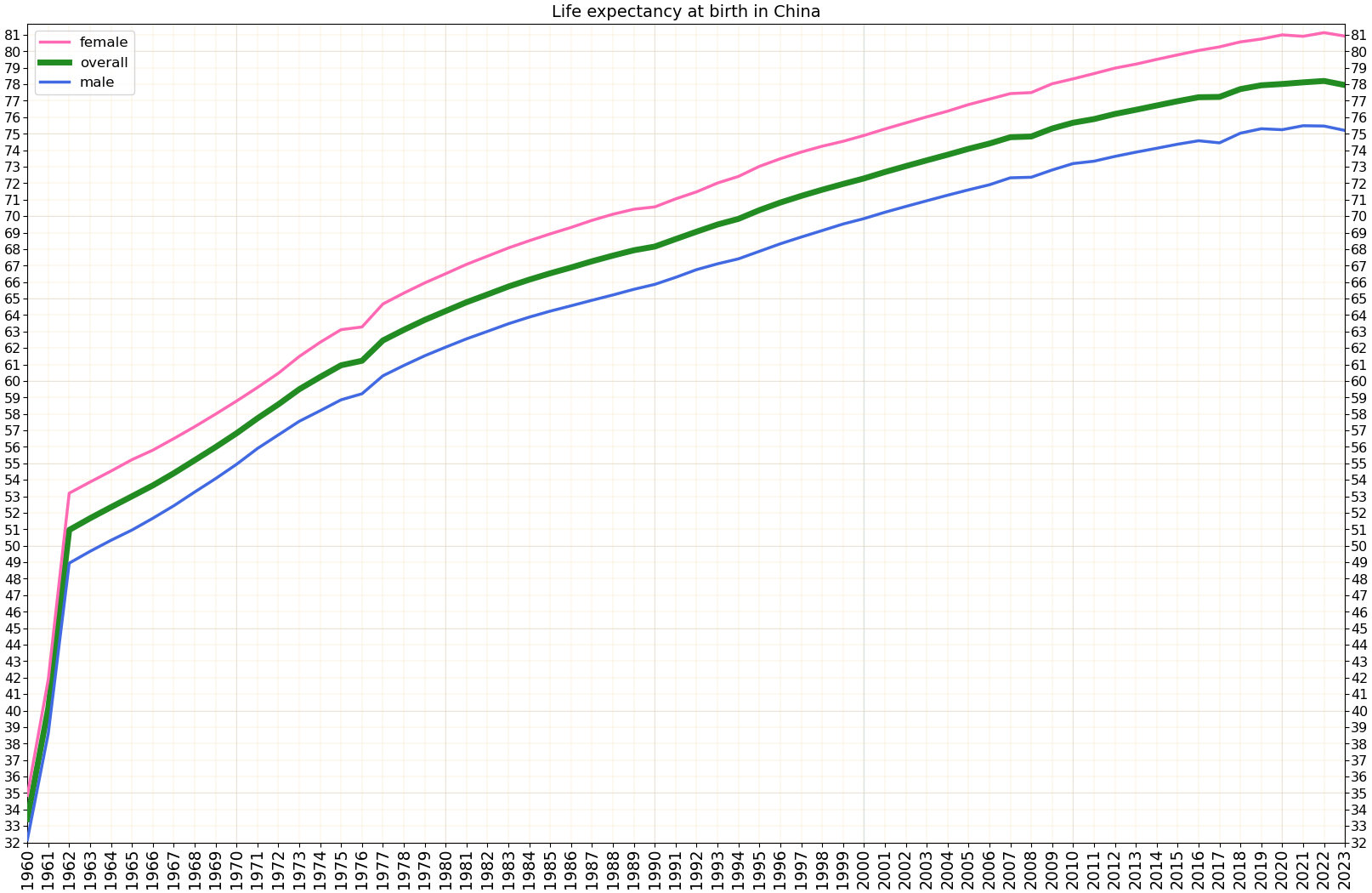
Development of life expectancy in China according to estimation of the World Bank Group

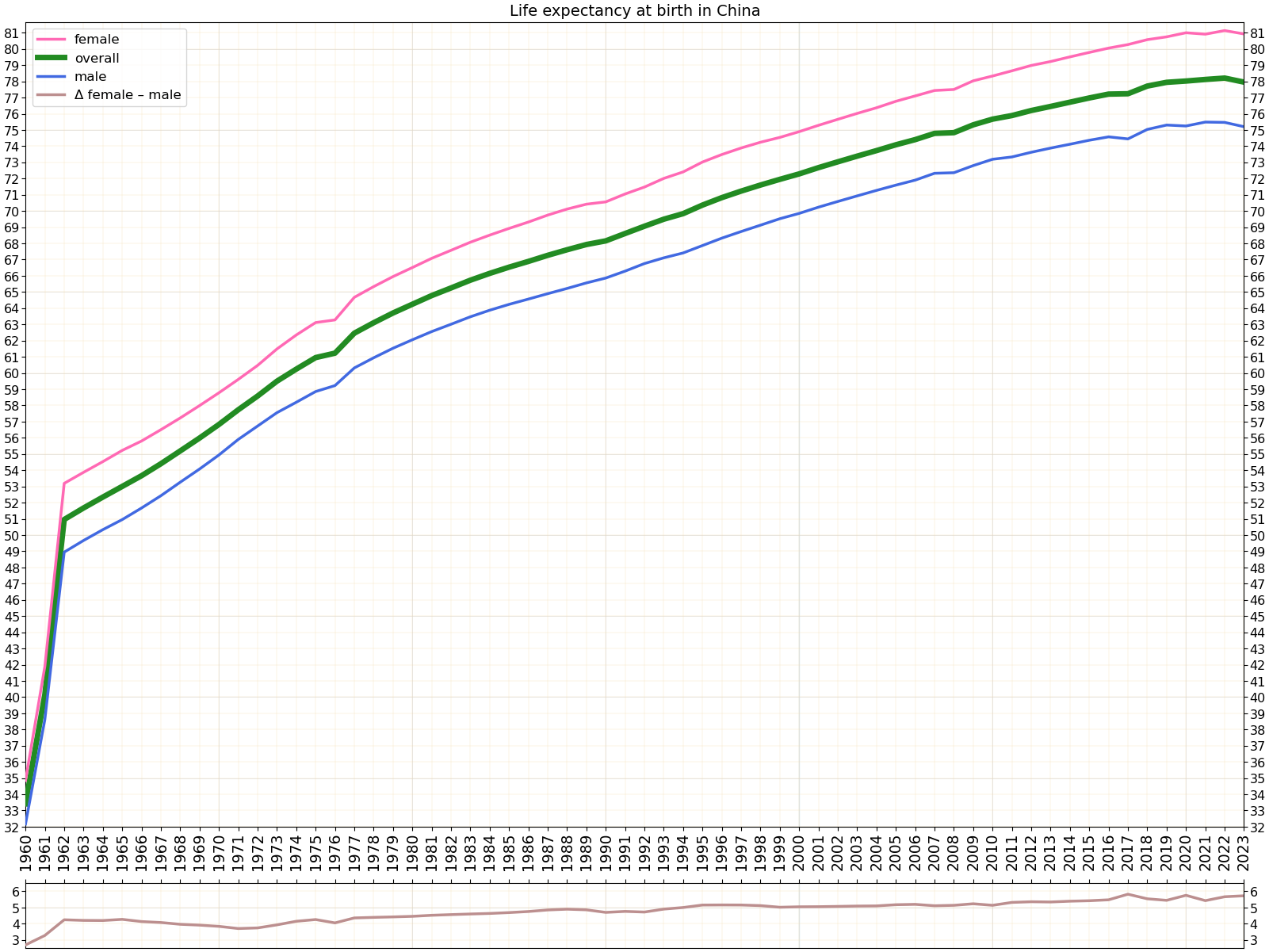
Life expectancy with calculated sex gap

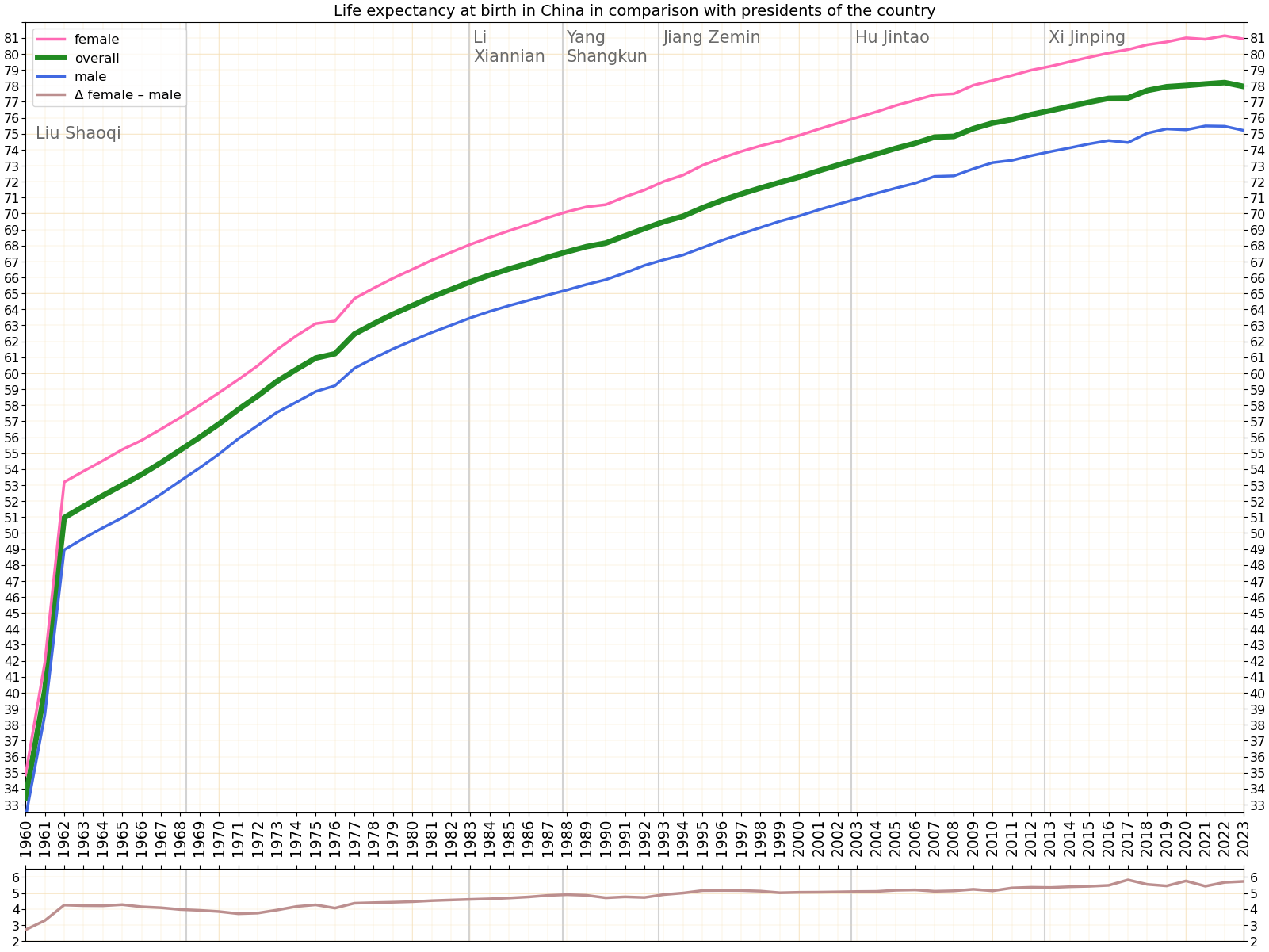
Life expectancy in comparison to president of PRC

Life expectancy in China according to estimation of Our World in Data

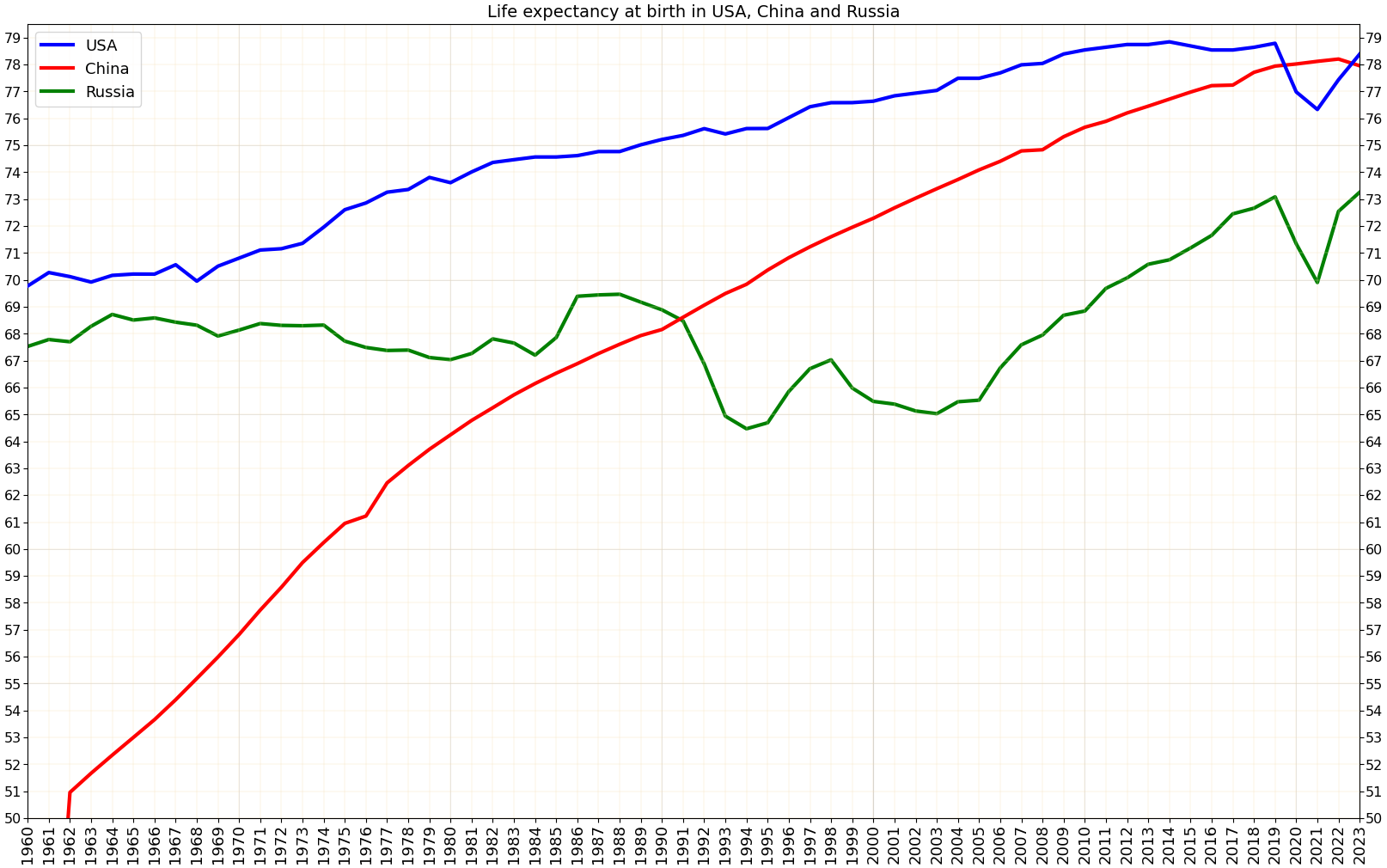
Comparison of life expectancy development in China, USA, Russia

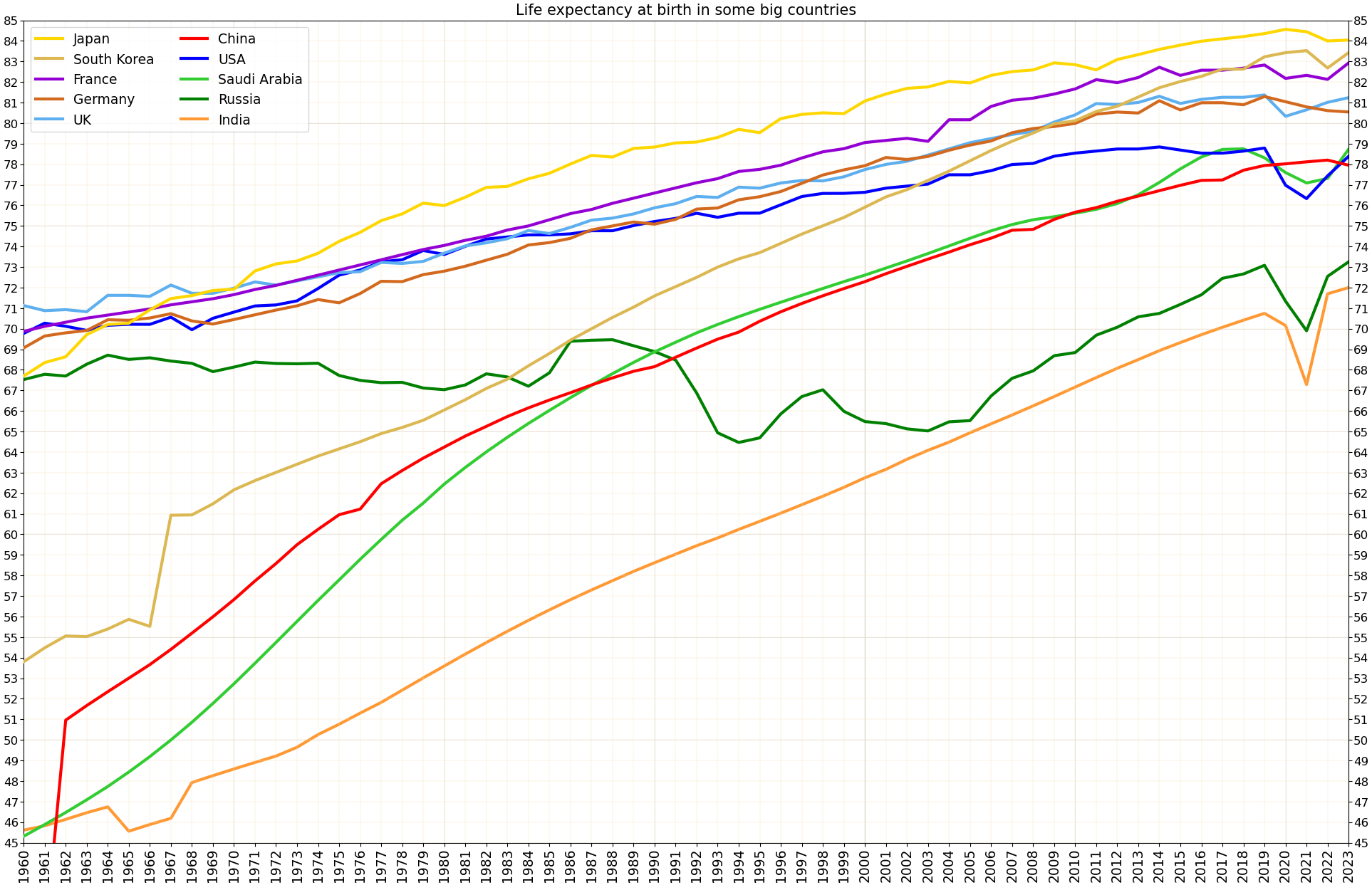
Development of life expectancy in China in comparison to some big countries of the world

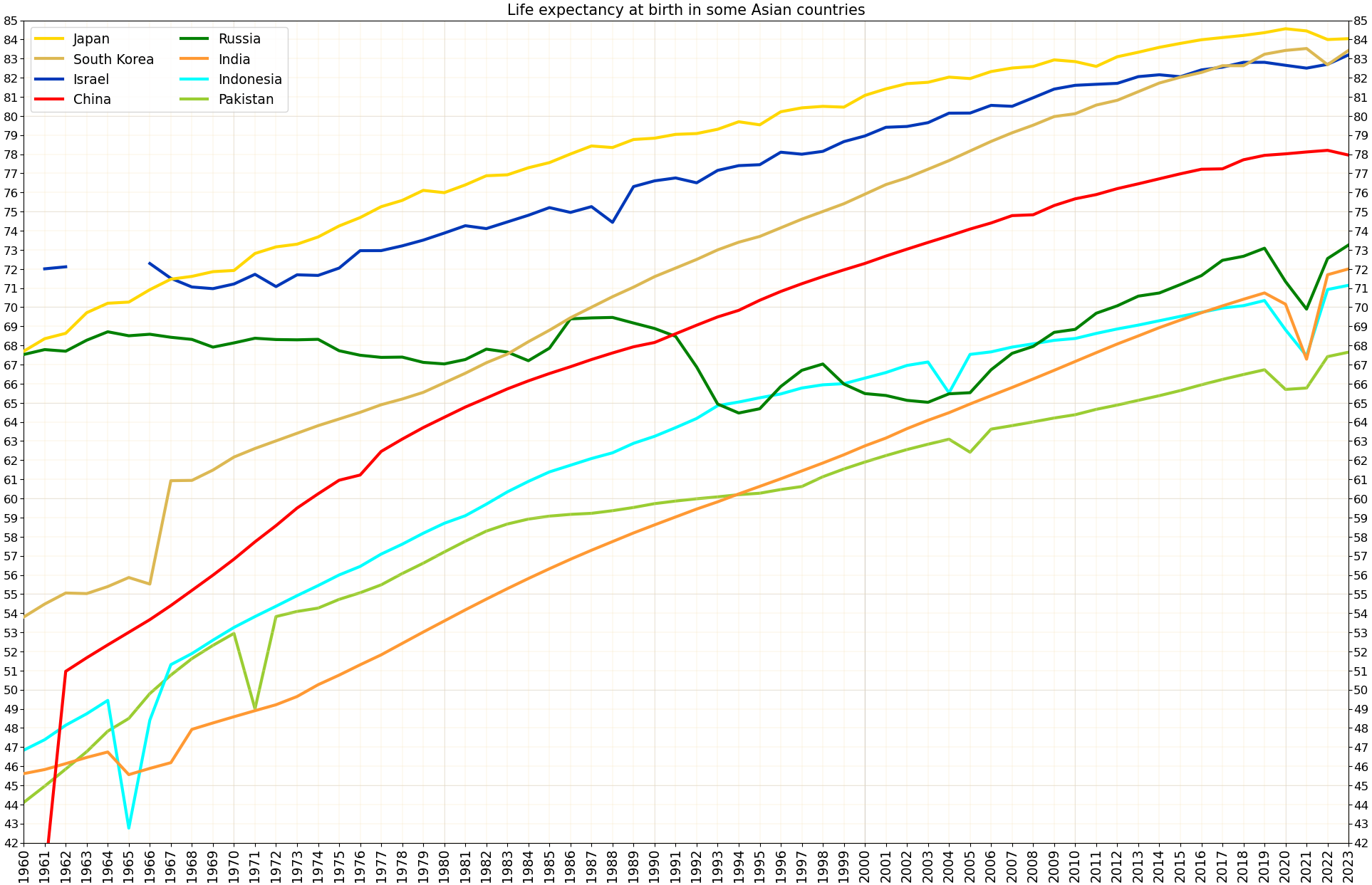
Development of life expectancy in China in comparison to other big countries of Asia

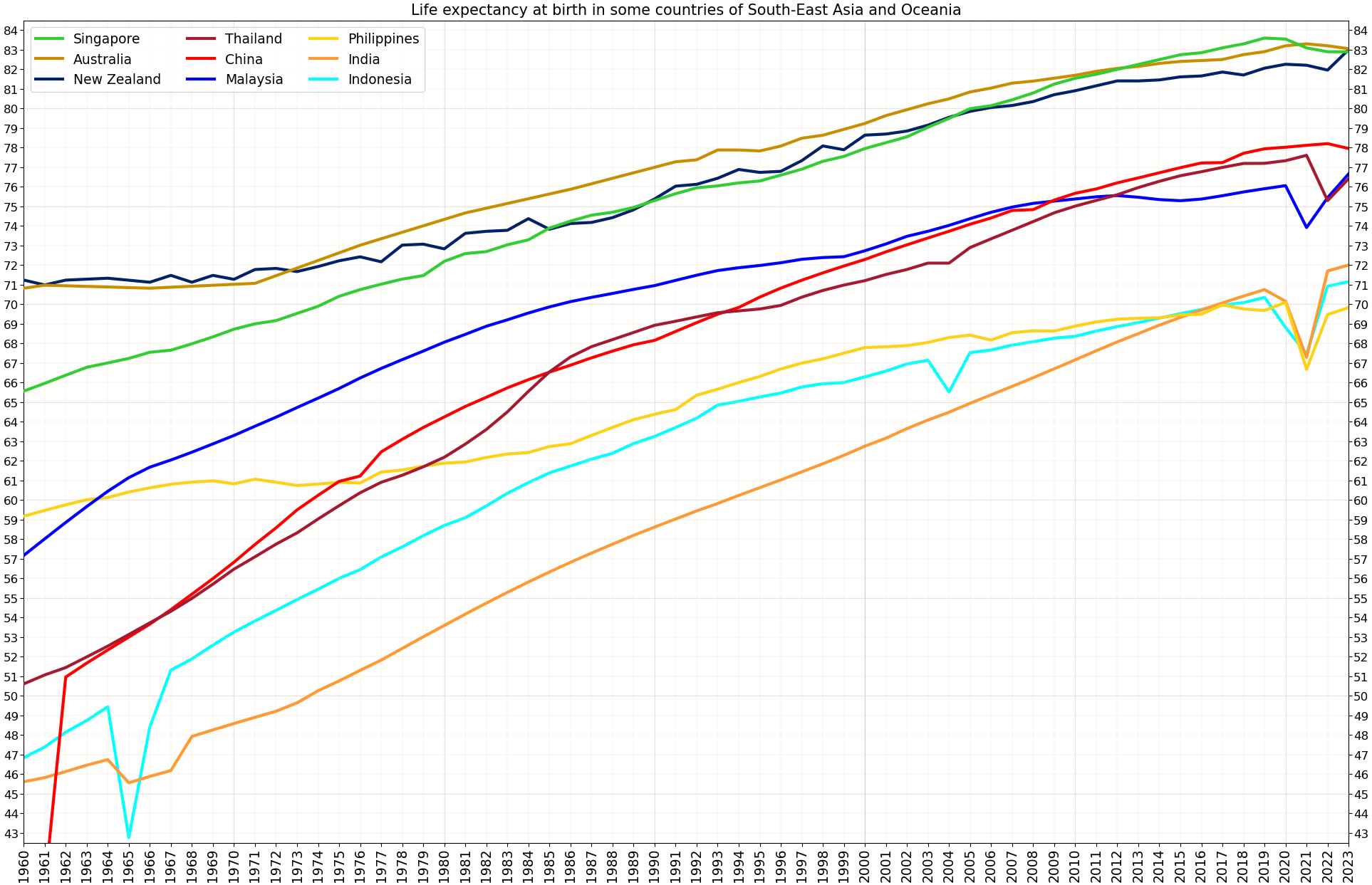
Development of life expectancy in China in comparison to some countries of South-East Asia and Oceania
Life expectancy and healthy life expectancy in China on the background of other countries of the world in 2019

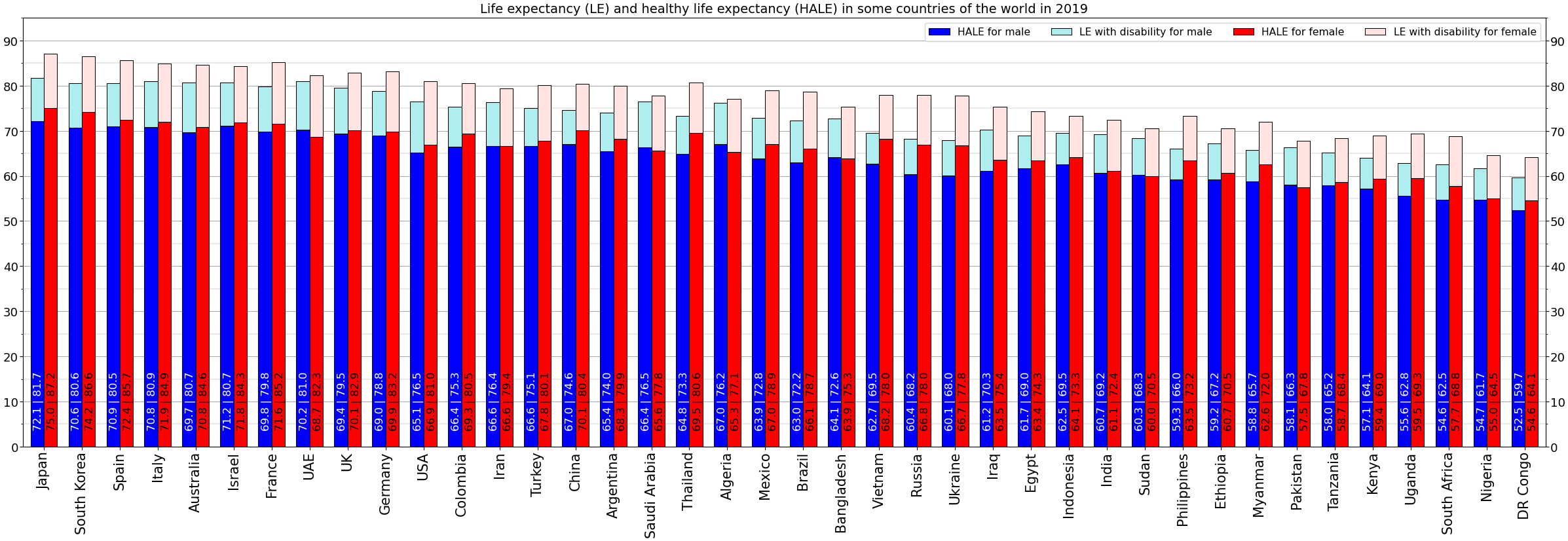
Life expectancy and healthy life expectancy for males and females separately
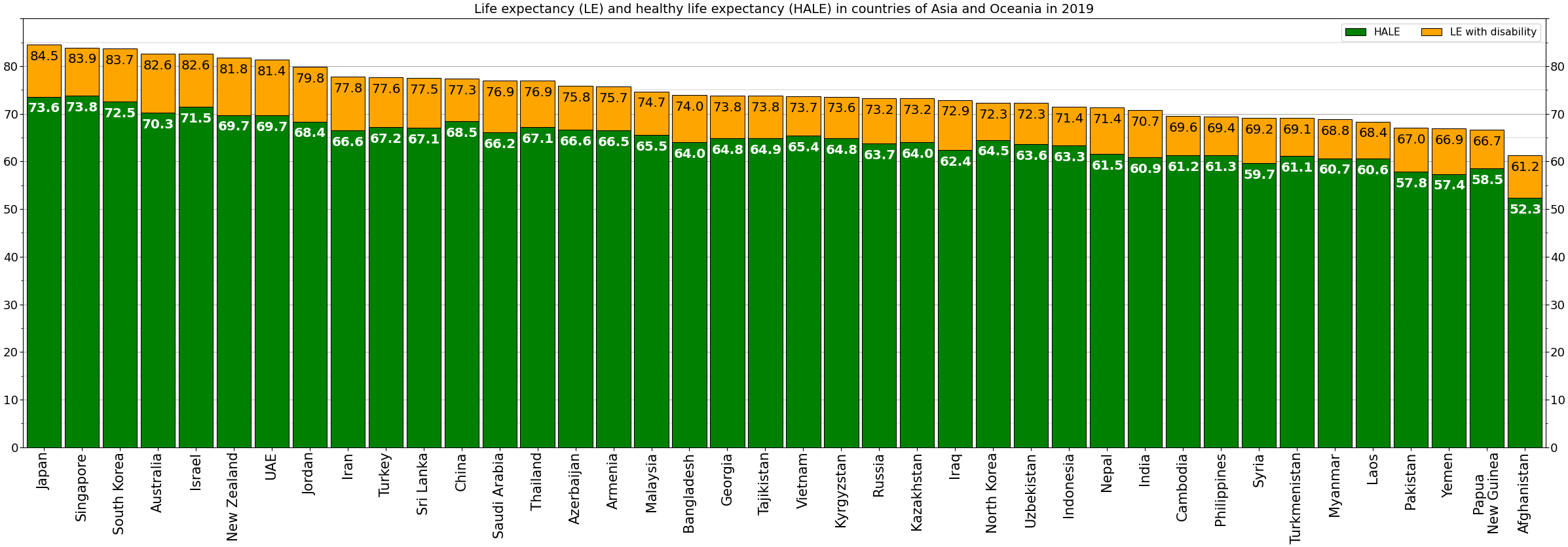
Life expectancy and healthy life expectancy in China on the background of countries of Asia and Oceania in 2019

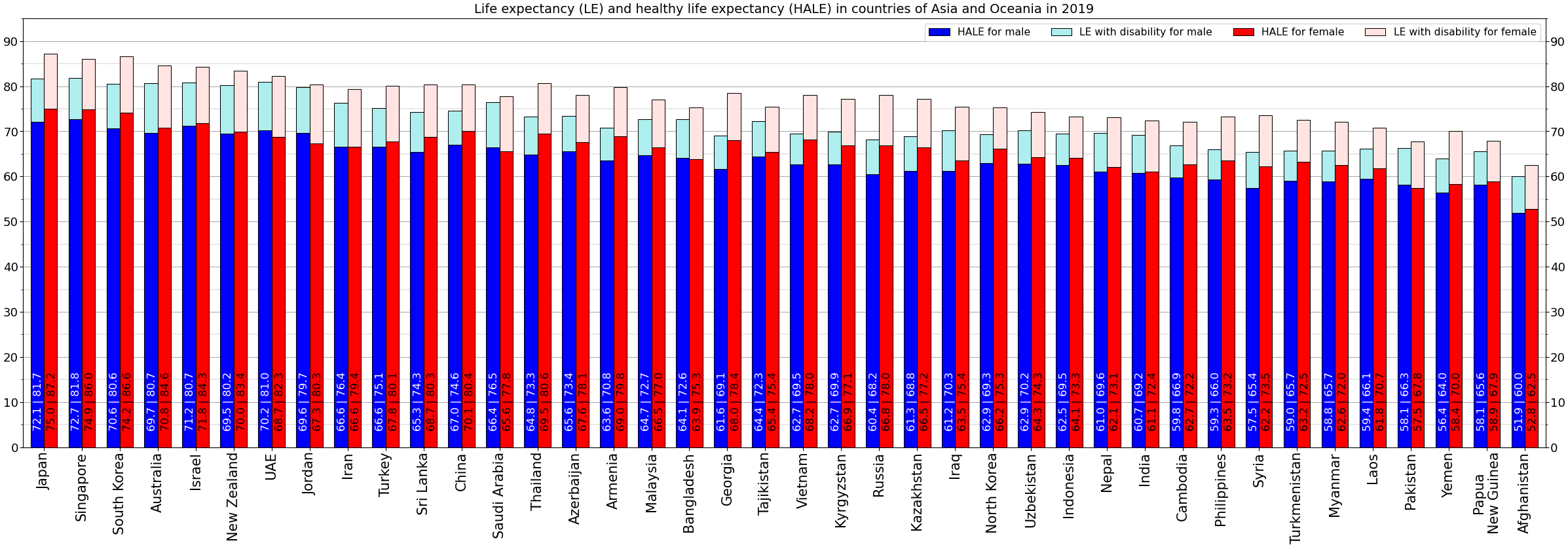
Life expectancy and healthy life expectancy for males and females separately

== See also ==
- List of Chinese cities by life expectancy
- List of Asian countries by life expectancy
- List of countries by life expectancy
- Demographics of China
