= List of cities in China by life expectancy =

This is a list of the cities of the People's Republic of China, including all direct-controlled municipalities, sub-provincial cities, prefecture-level cities, but excluding special administrative regions, in order of their life expectancy. Some data count the city's hukou holders only.

Most cities with high life expectancy are located in the Yangtze River Delta, Pearl River Delta and Beijing-Tianjin region.

Rank	City	Life expectancy	Year	Province
1	Suzhou	85.21	2024	Jiangsu #1
2	Hangzhou	84.18	2025	Zhejiang #1
3	Shanghai	83.63	2018	Shanghai
4	Nanjing	83.32	2018	Jiangsu #2
5	Nantong	82.61	2018	Jiangsu #3
6	Zhuhai	82.50	2016	Guangdong #1
7	Jiaxing	82.43	2018	Zhejiang #2
8	Wuxi	82.35	2018	Jiangsu #4
9	Changzhou	82.22	2015	Jiangsu #5
10	Beijing	82.2	2018	Beijing
11	Huzhou	81.89	2018	Zhejiang #3
12	Tianjin	81.68	2017	Tianjin
13	Ningbo	81.62	2018	Zhejiang #4
14	Shaoxing	81.43	2018	Zhejiang #5
15	Guangzhou	81.34	2016	Guangdong #2
16	Shenzhen	81.25	2018	Guangdong #3
17	Foshan	81.2	2017	Guangdong #4
18	Dongguan	81.14	2018	Guangdong #5
19	Wuhan	81.09	2017	Hubei #1
20	Zhenjiang	81.05	2017	Jiangsu #6
21	Taizhou (Jiangsu)	80.97	2017	Jiangsu #7
22	Qingdao	80.86	2018	Shandong #1
23	Weihai	80.8	2016	Shandong #2
24	Xiamen	80.75	2018	Fujian #1
25	Dalian	80.55	2018	Liaoning #1
26	Chengdu	80.54	2018	Sichuan #1
27	Wenzhou	80.5	2016	Zhejiang #6
28	Lishui	80.36	2018	Zhejiang #7
29	Shenyang	80.01	2015	Liaoning #2
30	Zhoushan	79.98	2018	Zhejiang #8
31	Taizhou (Zhejiang)	79.91	2018	Zhejiang #9
32	Anshan	79.6	2015	Liaoning #3
33	Jinan	79.53	2017	Shandong #3
34	Fuzhou	79.5	2016	Fujian #2
35	Changsha	79.08	2017	Hunan #1
36	Yantai	79.00	2016	Shandong #4
37	Kunming	78.96	2017	Yunnan #1
38	Xi'an	78.53	2015	Shaanxi #1
39	Taiyuan	78.5	2015	Shanxi #1
40	Zhengzhou	78.4	2015	Henan #1
41	Harbin	78.21	2016	Heilongjiang #1
42	Nanchang	78.00	2015	Jiangxi #1
43	Baotou	77.89	2015	Inner Mongolia #1
44	Chongqing	77.88	2015	Chongqing
45=	Baoding	77	2015	Hebei #1
45=	Guilin	77	2018	Guangxi #1
47	Hefei	76.56	2015	Anhui #1
48	Urumqi	75.8 (Urban)	2015	Xinjiang #1
49	Changchun	75.63	2016	Jilin #1
50	Yinchuan	75	2013	Ningxia #1
51	Guiyang	74.86	2010	Guizhou #1
52	Xining	74.62	2015	Qinghai #1
53	Lanzhou	73.5	2015	Gansu #1

== See also ==
- List of Chinese administrative divisions by life expectancy
- List of Asian countries by life expectancy
