= List of regions of Israel and Palestine by life expectancy =

== 2016 ==
This table includes life expectancy of each Israeli district and Palestinian region. Data were reported separately by the Israel Central Bureau of Statistics and the Palestinian Central Bureau of Statistics, respectively, in 2016.

Region	Overall (Note: The overall data of Palestine is calculated by averaging the male and female data due to the absence of directly reported data)	male	female	sex gap
Israel	82.5	80.7	84.2	3.5
Judea and Samaria, Israel (Note: Includes only "Israeli localities" in the region, as defined by Central Bureau of Statistics)	83.7	83.0	84.3	1.3
Central District, Israel	83.6	81.9	85.3	3.4
Tel Aviv District, Israel	83.3	81.6	84.8	3.2
Jerusalem District, Israel	83.0	81.4	84.4	3.0
Haifa District, Israel	82.0	79.9	83.9	4.0
Northern District, Israel	81.4	79.4	83.4	4.0
Southern District, Israel	81.0	78.8	83.1	4.3
Palestine	73.7	72.1	75.2	3.1
West Bank, Palestine	74.0	72.4	75.5	3.1
Gaza Strip, Palestine	73.0	71.5	74.6	3.1

By 2022, Life expectancy had increased to about 73.2 years and 75.3 years for males and females, respectively, for Palestine. In 2024, life expectancy in Israel was reported to have increased to 81.7 for men and 85.7 for women.

== Estimate of the Global Data Lab for Palestine (2018–2022) ==
region	2018				2018 →2019	2019				2019 →2021	2021	2021 →2022	2022				2018 →2022
region	overall	male	female	F Δ M	2018 →2019	overall	male	female	F Δ M	2019 →2021	overall	2021 →2022	overall	male	female	F Δ M	2018 →2022
Palestine on average	74.83	72.73	76.94	4.21	−0.04	74.79	72.46	77.14	4.68	−0.39	74.40	−0.93	73.47	71.09	75.94	4.85	−1.36
Tulkarm	75.81	73.64	78.10	4.46	−0.53	75.28	72.92	77.72	4.80	−0.88	74.40	−0.93	73.47	71.09	75.94	4.85	−2.34
Jericho and Al Aghwar	75.53	73.46	77.64	4.18	−0.39	75.14	72.83	77.49	4.66	−0.74	74.40	−0.93	73.47	71.09	75.94	4.85	−2.06
Jerusalem	75.39	73.25	77.60	4.35	−0.32	75.07	72.72	77.47	4.75	−0.67	74.40	−0.93	73.47	71.09	75.94	4.85	−1.92
Bethlehem	75.30	73.17	77.49	4.32	−0.27	75.03	72.68	77.42	4.74	−0.63	74.40	−0.93	73.47	71.09	75.94	4.85	−1.83
Tubas	75.29	73.16	77.48	4.32	−0.27	75.02	72.68	77.41	4.73	−0.62	74.40	−0.93	73.47	71.09	75.94	4.85	−1.82
Deir al-Balah	75.14	73.02	77.30	4.28	−0.19	74.95	72.61	77.32	4.71	−0.55	74.40	−0.93	73.47	71.09	75.94	4.85	−1.67
Khan Yunis	75.08	72.96	77.23	4.27	−0.17	74.91	72.58	77.28	4.70	−0.51	74.40	−0.93	73.47	71.09	75.94	4.85	−1.61
Jenin	75.03	72.92	77.18	4.26	−0.14	74.89	72.56	77.26	4.70	−0.49	74.40	−0.93	73.47	71.09	75.94	4.85	−1.56
Ramallah and al-Bireh	74.92	72.81	77.03	4.22	−0.09	74.83	72.50	77.19	4.69	−0.43	74.40	−0.93	73.47	71.09	75.94	4.85	−1.45
Nablus	74.85	72.74	76.95	4.21	−0.05	74.80	72.47	77.14	4.67	−0.40	74.40	−0.93	73.47	71.09	75.94	4.85	−1.38
Rafah	74.70	72.61	76.78	4.17	0.03	74.73	72.40	77.06	4.66	−0.33	74.40	−0.93	73.47	71.09	75.94	4.85	−1.23
Hebron	74.54	72.45	76.58	4.13	0.11	74.65	72.33	76.96	4.63	−0.25	74.40	−0.93	73.47	71.09	75.94	4.85	−1.07
Salfit	74.44	72.35	76.45	4.10	0.16	74.60	72.28	76.90	4.62	−0.20	74.40	−0.93	73.47	71.09	75.94	4.85	−0.97
Gaza City	74.42	72.34	76.44	4.10	0.17	74.59	72.27	76.89	4.62	−0.19	74.40	−0.93	73.47	71.09	75.94	4.85	−0.95
North Gaza	74.39	72.31	76.41	4.10	0.18	74.57	72.26	76.87	4.61	−0.17	74.40	−0.93	73.47	71.09	75.94	4.85	−0.92
Qalqiliya	74.33	72.25	76.33	4.08	0.21	74.54	72.23	76.84	4.61	−0.14	74.40	−0.93	73.47	71.09	75.94	4.85	−0.86

Data source: Global Data Lab

== Charts ==
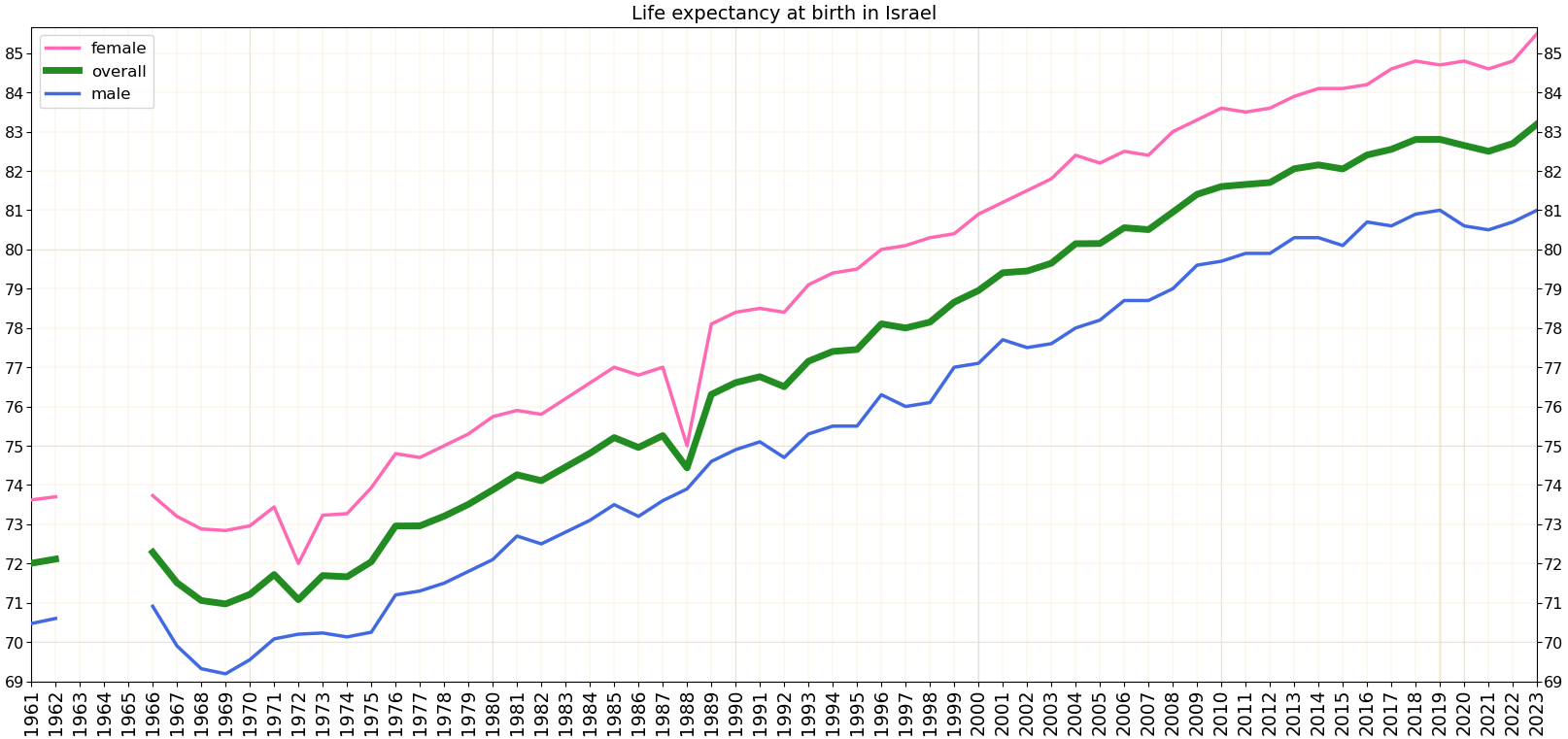
Development of life expectancy in Israel since 1961 according to estimation of the World Bank Group

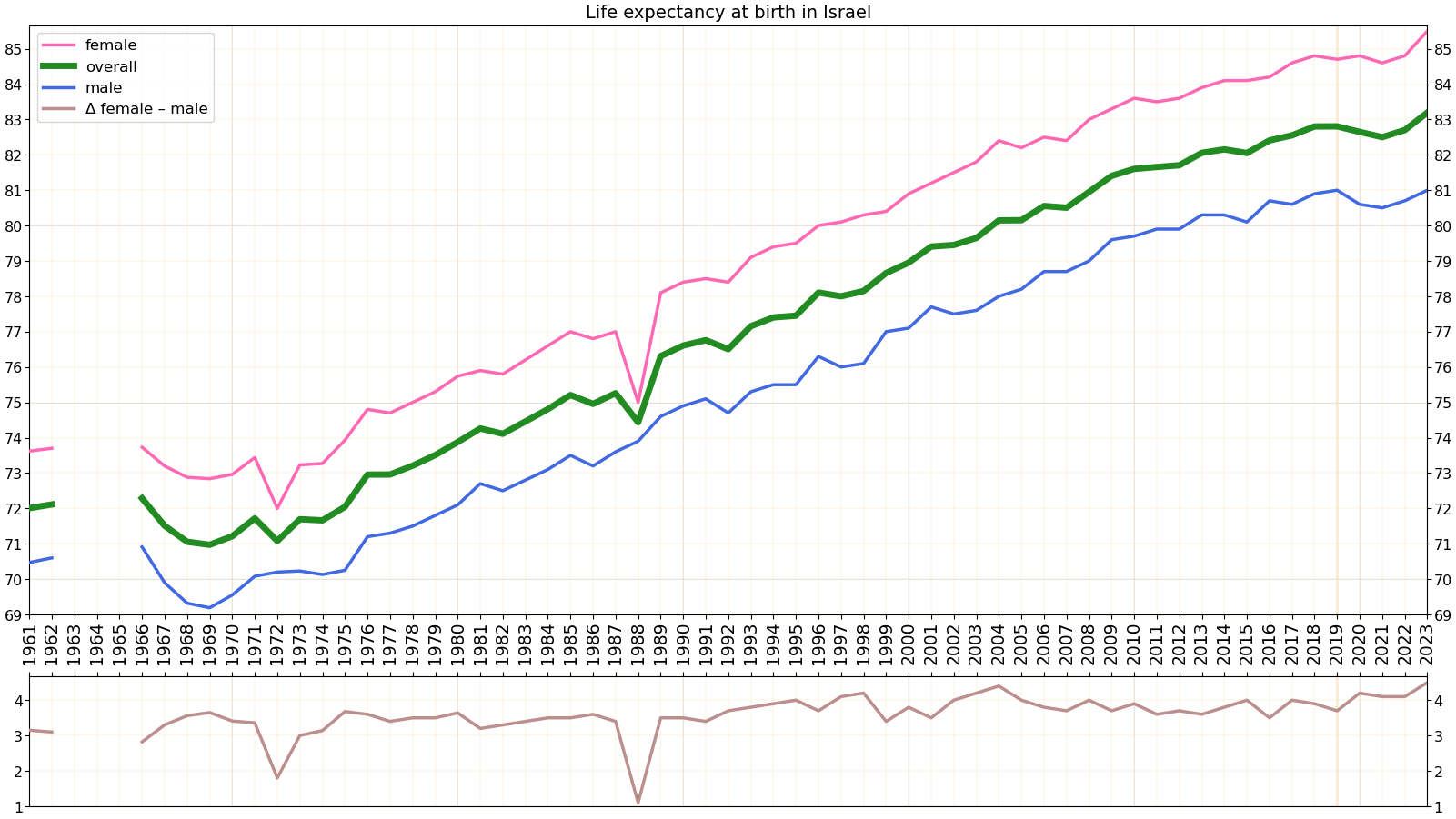
Life expectancy in Israel with calculated sex gap
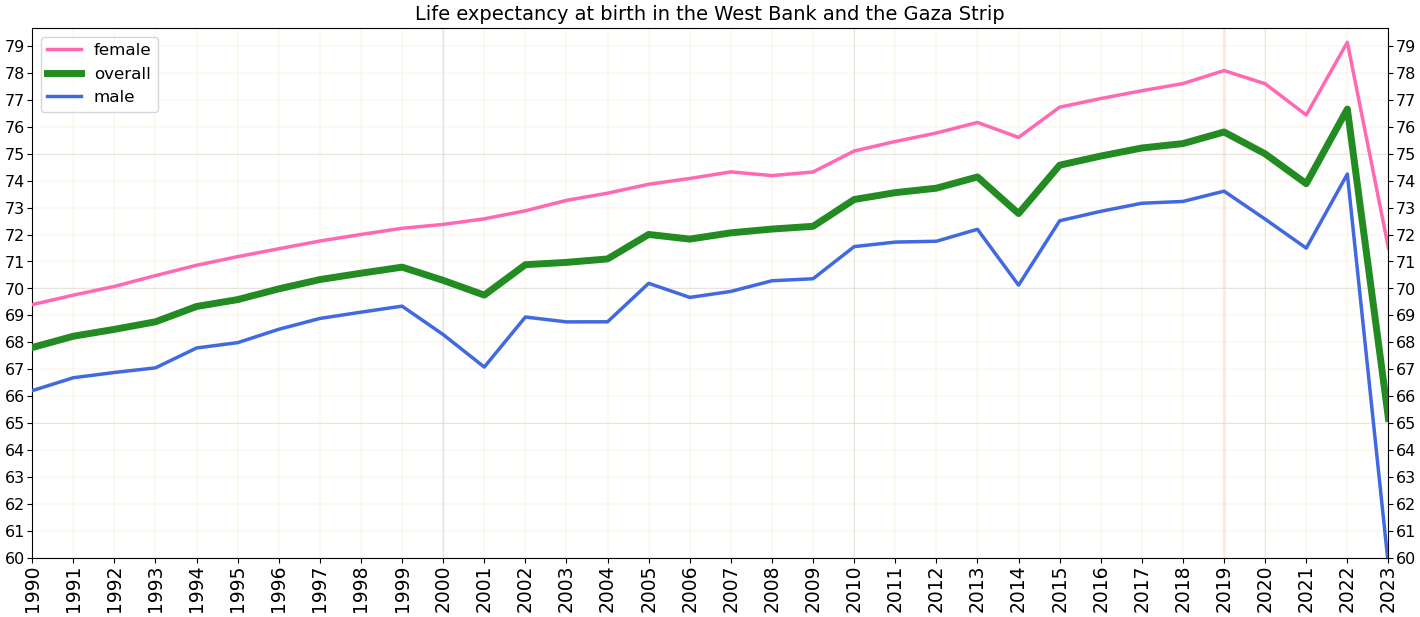
Development of life expectancy in the West Bank and Gaza since 1990

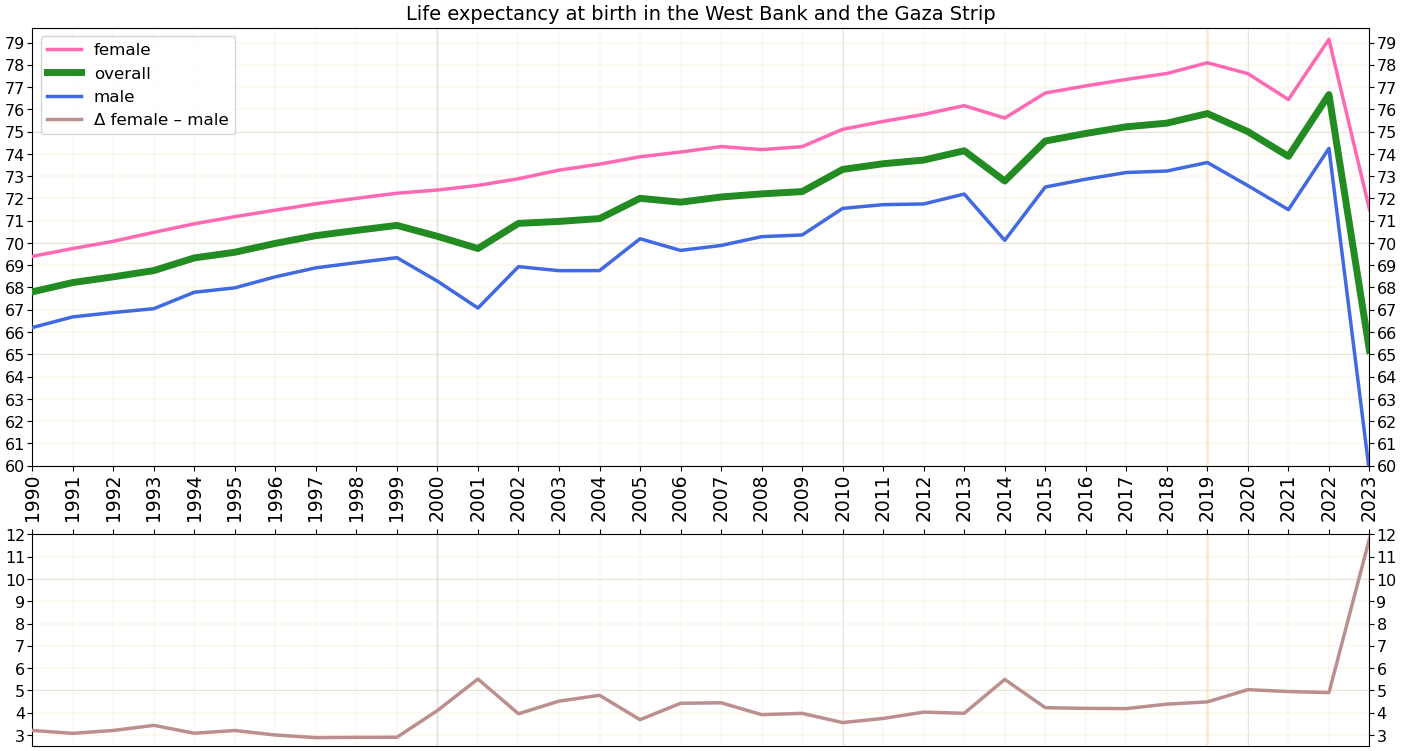
Life expectancy in the West Bank and Gaza with calculated sex gap

== See also ==
- Districts of Israel
- Demographics of Israel
- Demographics of Palestine
- Governorates of Palestine
- List of Asian countries by life expectancy
