= List of Asian countries by life expectancy =

This is a list of Asian countries by life expectancy.

== United Nations (2023) ==
Estimation of the analytical agency of the UN.

=== UN: Estimate of life expectancy for various ages in 2023 ===
Countries and territories	Life expectancy for population in general							Life expectancy for male				Life expectancy for female				Sex gap				Population (thous.)	
Countries and territories	at birth	bonus 0→15	at 15	bonus 15→65	at 65	bonus 65→80	at 80	at birth	at 15	at 65	at 80	at birth	at 15	at 65	at 80	at birth	at 15	at 65	at 80	Population (thous.)	
Hong Kong	85.51	0.21	70.72	2.47	23.19	3.27	11.45	82.84	68.06	21.21	10.26	88.13	73.33	25.21	12.54	5.29	5.27	4.00	2.27	7443	(Hong Kong)
Japan	84.71	0.24	69.96	2.54	22.49	3.45	10.95	81.69	66.93	19.98	9.27	87.74	72.98	24.85	12.20	6.05	6.05	4.87	2.93	124371	(Japan)
South Korea	84.33	0.30	69.63	1.69	21.32	4.14	10.45	81.19	66.51	18.63	8.40	87.16	72.44	23.55	11.68	5.96	5.93	4.92	3.27	51749	(South Korea)
Singapore	83.74	0.27	69.00	2.87	21.87	3.87	10.74	81.24	66.51	20.03	9.66	86.24	71.50	23.53	11.50	5.00	4.99	3.50	1.84	5789	(Singapore)
Macao	83.08	0.29	68.37	2.33	20.70	3.05	8.75	80.83	66.22	19.24	7.92	85.25	70.43	22.19	9.47	4.42	4.21	2.95	1.55	714	(Macau)
UAE	82.91	0.54	68.45	1.57	20.01	3.21	8.23	81.98	67.56	19.39	7.64	84.20	69.70	20.72	8.86	2.23	2.14	1.33	1.22	10642	(United Arab Emirates)
Israel	82.41	0.40	67.81	3.05	20.86	3.87	9.73	80.18	65.62	19.65	9.22	84.59	69.95	21.93	10.12	4.41	4.33	2.28	0.89	9256	(Israel)
Qatar	82.37	0.51	67.88	1.73	19.61	3.96	8.57	81.61	67.17	18.94	7.96	83.37	68.83	20.43	9.31	1.76	1.67	1.49	1.35	2979	(Qatar)
Cyprus	81.65	0.33	66.97	2.16	19.14	4.48	8.62	79.64	64.98	17.64	7.76	83.67	68.97	20.57	9.28	4.03	3.99	2.93	1.51	1345	(Cyprus)
Bahrain	81.28	0.66	66.94	2.61	19.55	4.46	9.01	80.67	66.39	19.10	8.50	81.99	67.59	20.04	9.54	1.31	1.20	0.94	1.04	1570	(Bahrain)
Maldives	81.04	0.47	66.51	1.94	18.46	4.47	7.92	79.69	65.19	17.38	7.31	82.82	68.27	19.82	8.65	3.13	3.08	2.44	1.34	526	(Maldives)
Taiwan	80.56	0.40	65.96	4.22	20.18	3.90	9.08	77.63	63.04	18.50	8.18	83.61	68.99	21.77	9.82	5.98	5.96	3.27	1.65	23317	
Kuwait	80.41	0.82	66.22	2.13	18.35	4.05	7.40	79.25	65.13	17.63	6.83	81.85	67.60	19.06	7.95	2.59	2.47	1.43	1.12	4839	(Kuwait)
Oman	80.03	1.01	66.04	2.48	18.53	4.63	8.16	78.49	64.58	17.35	7.47	81.88	67.82	19.72	8.77	3.39	3.24	2.37	1.30	5049	(Oman)
Saudi Arabia	78.73	0.67	64.41	3.80	18.21	4.93	8.13	77.10	62.81	17.18	7.49	81.16	66.80	19.51	8.78	4.06	3.99	2.33	1.29	33264	(Saudi Arabia)
China	77.95	0.73	63.69	3.77	17.45	5.06	7.52	75.20	60.97	15.55	6.45	80.93	66.61	19.34	8.40	5.72	5.64	3.79	1.95	1422585	(China)
Lebanon	77.82	1.59	64.41	3.23	17.64	5.17	7.81	75.74	62.40	16.09	6.86	79.73	66.25	18.98	8.40	3.99	3.85	2.89	1.53	5773	(Lebanon)
Jordan	77.81	1.21	64.02	3.31	17.32	5.31	7.64	75.71	61.99	15.73	6.67	80.19	66.32	19.01	8.42	4.48	4.33	3.28	1.75	11439	(Jordan)
Iran	77.65	1.17	63.83	3.76	17.59	4.39	6.98	75.79	61.99	16.79	6.43	79.63	65.76	18.36	7.42	3.84	3.76	1.57	1.00	90609	(Iran)
Sri Lanka	77.48	0.57	63.05	3.96	17.01	5.60	7.62	74.24	59.86	15.00	6.77	80.59	66.11	18.71	8.16	6.35	6.26	3.71	1.39	22972	(Sri Lanka)
Turkey	77.16	1.36	63.52	4.06	17.58	5.18	7.75	74.53	60.85	15.57	6.41	79.86	66.26	19.46	8.78	5.33	5.40	3.89	2.37	87271	(Turkey)
Malaysia	76.66	0.73	62.39	5.21	17.60	6.42	9.02	74.27	60.05	16.37	8.36	79.37	65.04	18.85	9.59	5.10	4.98	2.48	1.23	35126	(Malaysia)
Thailand	76.41	0.90	62.31	7.29	19.61	5.05	9.65	72.16	58.15	17.79	8.87	80.86	66.66	21.19	10.21	8.70	8.51	3.40	1.34	71702	(Thailand)
Armenia	75.68	0.84	61.53	4.66	16.19	5.93	7.12	71.39	57.25	13.86	6.16	79.45	65.26	17.84	7.61	8.07	8.01	3.97	1.45	2943	(Armenia)
Brunei	75.33	0.88	61.21	4.98	16.19	5.95	7.14	73.33	59.24	14.83	6.53	77.56	63.40	17.57	7.68	4.23	4.17	2.74	1.15	459	(Brunei)
Bangladesh	74.67	2.44	62.11	5.41	17.52	5.99	8.51	73.03	60.61	16.61	7.97	76.37	63.65	18.42	8.94	3.34	3.03	1.81	0.97	171467	(Bangladesh)
Vietnam	74.59	2.00	61.58	5.79	17.37	5.65	8.02	69.88	57.17	14.73	6.34	79.26	65.86	19.41	8.91	9.39	8.69	4.67	2.57	100352	(Vietnam)
Asia	74.57	2.26	61.83	5.25	17.08	5.84	7.93	72.08	59.39	15.51	6.99	77.20	64.40	18.57	8.64	5.12	5.01	3.06	1.65	4778004	
Georgia	74.50	0.81	60.31	5.85	16.16	6.17	7.32	69.57	55.42	13.38	5.39	79.11	64.86	18.16	8.30	9.54	9.44	4.78	2.91	3807	(Georgia (country))
Azerbaijan	74.43	1.50	60.93	4.44	15.38	6.19	6.57	71.56	58.15	13.80	5.90	77.13	63.53	16.63	6.95	5.57	5.38	2.83	1.05	10318	(Azerbaijan)
Kazakhstan	74.40	0.87	60.27	5.98	16.26	6.09	7.35	70.11	56.05	13.84	6.30	78.39	64.18	17.87	7.76	8.28	8.13	4.03	1.46	20330	(Kazakhstan)
North Korea	73.64	1.76	60.40	5.60	15.99	5.63	6.63	71.46	58.38	14.88	5.95	75.74	62.31	16.84	6.97	4.29	3.93	1.96	1.02	26418	(North Korea)
World	73.17	3.29	61.46	6.11	17.57	5.75	8.31	70.55	58.91	16.01	7.43	75.89	64.09	18.98	8.96	5.34	5.18	2.97	1.53	8091735	
Bhutan	72.97	1.92	59.89	4.92	14.81	6.40	6.21	71.31	58.37	13.84	5.79	74.97	61.72	15.90	6.63	3.66	3.35	2.05	0.84	786	(Bhutan)
Uzbekistan	72.39	1.21	58.60	6.17	14.77	6.35	6.12	69.45	55.72	12.94	5.41	75.40	61.54	16.33	6.50	5.95	5.83	3.40	1.09	35652	(Uzbekistan)
Iraq	72.32	1.95	59.27	5.33	14.60	6.51	6.11	70.43	57.53	13.54	5.64	74.06	60.83	15.41	6.38	3.63	3.30	1.88	0.74	45074	(Iraq)
Syria	72.12	2.08	59.20	5.67	14.88	6.39	6.27	69.83	57.00	13.66	5.69	74.41	61.38	15.97	6.69	4.58	4.38	2.31	1.00	23595	(Syria)
India	72.00	2.29	59.29	6.15	15.44	7.09	7.53	70.52	57.75	14.76	7.29	73.60	60.95	16.10	7.71	3.08	3.19	1.34	0.42	1438070	(India)
Tajikistan	71.79	2.37	59.16	5.22	14.38	6.73	6.12	69.57	57.18	13.20	5.62	73.98	61.09	15.43	6.46	4.40	3.91	2.23	0.84	10390	(Tajikistan)
Mongolia	71.73	1.07	57.81	7.42	15.23	6.56	6.79	67.24	53.37	13.03	5.96	76.43	62.43	16.98	7.32	9.19	9.05	3.96	1.36	3432	(Mongolia)
Kyrgyzstan	71.68	1.40	58.08	6.01	14.09	6.78	5.87	68.18	54.69	12.47	5.27	75.25	61.51	15.44	6.25	7.07	6.82	2.97	0.98	7074	(Kyrgyzstan)
Indonesia	71.15	1.76	57.91	6.54	14.44	6.91	6.36	69.04	55.89	13.09	5.76	73.27	59.92	15.63	6.73	4.23	4.03	2.54	0.98	281190	(Indonesia)
Cambodia	70.67	2.33	58.00	7.20	15.20	6.35	6.55	68.01	55.65	14.23	6.12	73.19	60.16	15.86	6.81	5.18	4.52	1.63	0.69	17424	(Cambodia)
Nepal	70.35	2.26	57.61	6.25	13.86	6.93	5.79	68.83	56.23	13.12	5.51	71.84	58.94	14.55	6.00	3.00	2.71	1.44	0.50	29695	(Nepal)
Turkmenistan	70.07	3.10	58.17	5.97	14.14	6.90	6.04	66.87	55.26	12.57	5.41	72.84	60.56	15.01	6.23	5.97	5.30	2.44	0.82	7364	(Turkmenistan)
Philippines	69.83	2.25	57.09	6.94	14.02	7.10	6.12	66.89	54.26	12.51	5.47	72.82	59.93	15.23	6.42	5.93	5.67	2.71	0.94	114891	(Philippines)
Yemen	69.30	3.23	57.52	6.43	13.95	6.88	5.83	67.23	55.68	13.05	5.49	71.39	59.37	14.71	6.06	4.15	3.69	1.66	0.57	39391	(Yemen)
Laos	68.96	3.19	57.15	6.60	13.75	7.01	5.76	66.78	55.26	12.83	5.41	71.25	59.11	14.61	6.02	4.47	3.85	1.78	0.62	7665	(Laos)
Timor-Leste	67.69	3.76	56.45	7.07	13.52	7.15	5.68	66.07	55.09	12.79	5.42	69.44	57.91	14.23	5.90	3.37	2.82	1.43	0.49	1384	(Timor-Leste)
Pakistan	67.65	4.64	57.28	6.52	13.80	6.96	5.76	65.33	55.24	12.84	5.41	70.16	59.49	14.75	6.08	4.83	4.25	1.92	0.67	247504	(Pakistan)
Myanmar	66.89	3.29	55.18	8.18	13.36	7.26	5.62	63.79	52.35	12.29	5.22	70.16	58.12	14.27	5.88	6.37	5.78	1.99	0.66	54134	(Myanmar)
Afghanistan	66.03	4.50	55.53	7.80	13.33	7.28	5.61	64.47	54.15	12.57	5.33	67.54	56.82	13.94	5.81	3.07	2.67	1.37	0.47	41455	(Afghanistan)
Palestine	65.17	3.31	53.48	12.44	15.92	6.16	7.08	59.69	47.91	13.97	6.01	71.50	59.90	17.91	7.90	11.81	11.99	3.94	1.89	5409	(Palestine)

=== UN: Change of life expectancy from 2019 to 2023 ===
Countries and territories	2023				Historical data									Recovery from COVID-19: 2019→2023	Population (thous.)	
Countries and territories	All	Male	Female	Sex gap	2019	2019 →2020	2020	2020 →2021	2021	2021 →2022	2022	2022 →2023	2023	Recovery from COVID-19: 2019→2023	Population (thous.)	
Hong Kong, China	85.51	82.84	88.13	5.29	85.26	−0.56	84.71	0.38	85.08	−1.60	83.48	2.03	85.51	0.25	7443	(Hong Kong)
Japan	84.71	81.69	87.74	6.05	84.42	0.25	84.67	−0.12	84.55	−0.50	84.05	0.66	84.71	0.29	124371	(Japan)
South Korea	84.33	81.19	87.16	5.96	83.69	−0.01	83.67	0.18	83.85	−1.12	82.73	1.60	84.33	0.64	51749	(South Korea)
Singapore	83.74	81.24	86.24	5.00	83.66	0.00	83.66	−0.18	83.48	−0.56	82.92	0.81	83.74	0.07	5789	(Singapore)
Macao, China	83.08	80.83	85.25	4.42	83.29	1.32	84.61	−0.79	83.82	−1.72	82.10	0.97	83.08	−0.22	714	(Macau)
UAE	82.91	81.98	84.20	2.23	82.60	−0.66	81.94	−2.85	79.08	1.40	80.49	2.42	82.91	0.31	10642	(United Arab Emirates)
Israel	82.41	80.18	84.59	4.41	82.91	−0.20	82.70	−0.18	82.52	0.30	82.81	−0.41	82.41	−0.50	9256	(Israel)
Qatar	82.37	81.61	83.37	1.76	82.94	−2.54	80.41	0.67	81.08	0.77	81.86	0.51	82.37	−0.58	2979	(Qatar)
Cyprus	81.65	79.64	83.67	4.03	81.45	−0.22	81.23	−0.66	80.57	−0.14	80.43	1.21	81.65	0.19	1345	(Cyprus)
Bahrain	81.28	80.67	81.99	1.31	80.47	−1.79	78.68	−0.60	78.08	2.91	80.99	0.29	81.28	0.81	1570	(Bahrain)
Maldives	81.04	79.69	82.82	3.13	79.71	−0.99	78.71	−0.66	78.05	2.71	80.76	0.28	81.04	1.33	526	(Maldives)
Taiwan	80.56	77.63	83.61	5.98	80.60	0.51	81.11	−0.32	80.78	−0.63	80.16	0.40	80.56	−0.04	23317	
Kuwait	80.41	79.25	81.85	2.59	80.02	−1.77	78.25	−0.62	77.62	1.16	78.79	1.62	80.41	0.38	4839	(Kuwait)
Oman	80.03	78.49	81.88	3.39	79.95	−2.18	77.76	−1.79	75.97	1.94	77.91	2.12	80.03	0.09	5049	(Oman)
Saudi Arabia	78.73	77.10	81.16	4.06	78.31	−0.72	77.60	−0.51	77.09	0.22	77.31	1.42	78.73	0.42	33264	(Saudi Arabia)
China	77.95	75.20	80.93	5.72	77.94	0.08	78.02	0.10	78.12	0.09	78.20	−0.25	77.95	0.01	1422585	(China)
Lebanon	77.82	75.74	79.73	3.99	78.21	−1.91	76.30	−2.65	73.65	4.35	78.00	−0.19	77.82	−0.39	5773	(Lebanon)
Jordan	77.81	75.71	80.19	4.48	76.86	−1.28	75.58	−1.38	74.20	2.88	77.09	0.73	77.81	0.95	11439	(Jordan)
Iran	77.65	75.79	79.63	3.84	76.86	−2.71	74.14	−0.39	73.75	3.05	76.80	0.85	77.65	0.80	90609	(Iran)
Sri Lanka	77.48	74.24	80.59	6.35	76.70	0.23	76.93	−0.65	76.28	1.02	77.30	0.18	77.48	0.79	22972	(Sri Lanka)
Turkey	77.16	74.53	79.86	5.33	77.74	−1.21	76.53	−0.80	75.72	1.87	77.59	−0.43	77.16	−0.58	87271	(Turkey)
Malaysia	76.66	74.27	79.37	5.10	75.90	0.16	76.06	−2.14	73.92	1.53	75.44	1.21	76.66	0.76	35126	(Malaysia)
Thailand	76.41	72.16	80.86	8.70	77.20	0.13	77.33	0.28	77.61	−2.31	75.29	1.12	76.41	−0.79	71702	(Thailand)
Armenia	75.68	71.39	79.45	8.07	75.19	−6.30	68.89	3.66	72.55	2.08	74.63	1.05	75.68	0.49	2943	(Armenia)
Brunei	75.33	73.33	77.56	4.23	75.05	0.07	75.11	−0.24	74.87	−1.95	72.92	2.41	75.33	0.28	459	(Brunei)
Bangladesh	74.67	73.03	76.37	3.34	72.62	−1.20	71.42	−0.32	71.10	3.16	74.27	0.41	74.67	2.05	171467	(Bangladesh)
Vietnam	74.59	69.88	79.26	9.39	74.21	1.17	75.38	−1.24	74.14	0.36	74.50	0.09	74.59	0.38	100352	(Vietnam)
Asia	74.57	72.08	77.20	5.12	74.05	−0.44	73.61	−1.24	72.37	2.06	74.43	0.14	74.57	0.52	4778004	
Georgia	74.50	69.57	79.11	9.54	74.17	−0.66	73.51	−1.87	71.64	2.51	74.14	0.35	74.50	0.33	3807	(Georgia (country))
Azerbaijan	74.43	71.56	77.13	5.57	73.29	−2.98	70.31	0.69	71.00	3.13	74.12	0.30	74.43	1.14	10318	(Azerbaijan)
Kazakhstan	74.40	70.11	78.39	8.28	73.66	−2.46	71.19	−1.06	70.13	3.37	73.50	0.90	74.40	0.74	20330	(Kazakhstan)
North Korea	73.64	71.46	75.74	4.29	72.93	−0.14	72.78	0.65	73.44	0.20	73.64	0.00	73.64	0.71	26418	(North Korea)
World	73.17	70.55	75.89	5.34	72.61	−0.69	71.92	−1.05	70.86	1.77	72.64	0.53	73.17	0.56	8091735	
Bhutan	72.97	71.31	74.97	3.66	72.00	0.25	72.25	0.20	72.45	0.31	72.75	0.22	72.97	0.97	786	(Bhutan)
Uzbekistan	72.39	69.45	75.40	5.95	72.09	−0.63	71.46	0.22	71.68	0.47	72.15	0.24	72.39	0.29	35652	(Uzbekistan)
Iraq	72.32	70.43	74.06	3.63	71.25	−1.59	69.65	1.05	70.70	1.33	72.04	0.29	72.32	1.08	45074	(Iraq)
Syria	72.12	69.83	74.41	4.58	70.97	0.97	71.94	0.47	72.42	0.37	72.79	−0.67	72.12	1.15	23595	(Syria)
India	72.00	70.52	73.60	3.08	70.75	−0.59	70.16	−2.87	67.28	4.42	71.70	0.30	72.00	1.26	1438070	(India)
Tajikistan	71.79	69.57	73.98	4.40	70.96	−2.36	68.61	0.99	69.59	1.97	71.56	0.23	71.79	0.83	10390	(Tajikistan)
Mongolia	71.73	67.24	76.43	9.19	70.66	−0.63	70.03	−1.46	68.56	2.94	71.50	0.23	71.73	1.07	3432	(Mongolia)
Kyrgyzstan	71.68	68.18	75.25	7.07	70.89	−1.75	69.14	0.15	69.29	2.20	71.49	0.19	71.68	0.79	7074	(Kyrgyzstan)
Indonesia	71.15	69.04	73.27	4.23	70.35	−1.53	68.82	−1.36	67.45	3.47	70.92	0.22	71.15	0.80	281190	(Indonesia)
Cambodia	70.67	68.01	73.19	5.18	70.13	−0.07	70.06	−0.76	69.30	1.23	70.53	0.14	70.67	0.54	17424	(Cambodia)
Nepal	70.35	68.83	71.84	3.00	69.30	−0.19	69.11	−0.72	68.39	1.70	70.09	0.27	70.35	1.05	29695	(Nepal)
Turkmenistan	70.07	66.87	72.84	5.97	69.41	−0.56	68.85	0.51	69.35	0.56	69.91	0.16	70.07	0.67	7364	(Turkmenistan)
Philippines	69.83	66.89	72.82	5.93	69.68	0.42	70.10	−3.42	66.67	2.80	69.47	0.36	69.83	0.15	114891	(Philippines)
Yemen	69.30	67.23	71.39	4.15	66.57	−0.13	66.44	−0.42	66.02	1.93	67.95	1.34	69.30	2.73	39391	(Yemen)
Laos	68.96	66.78	71.25	4.47	67.91	0.43	68.34	−0.53	67.81	0.91	68.72	0.25	68.96	1.05	7665	(Laos)
Timor-Leste	67.69	66.07	69.44	3.37	66.50	0.42	66.92	−0.72	66.20	1.17	67.37	0.32	67.69	1.19	1384	(Timor-Leste)
Pakistan	67.65	65.33	70.16	4.83	66.73	−1.03	65.70	0.07	65.77	1.64	67.42	0.23	67.65	0.92	247504	(Pakistan)
Myanmar	66.89	63.79	70.16	6.37	66.46	0.15	66.61	−1.06	65.55	0.95	66.51	0.38	66.89	0.43	54134	(Myanmar)
Afghanistan	66.03	64.47	67.54	3.07	62.94	−1.49	61.45	−1.04	60.42	5.20	65.62	0.42	66.03	3.09	41455	(Afghanistan)
Palestine	65.17	59.69	71.50	11.81	75.81	−0.81	75.00	−1.11	73.89	2.77	76.66	−11.49	65.17	−10.64	5409	(Palestine)

== World Bank Group (2024) ==
Estimation of the World Bank Group for 2024. The data is filtered according to the list of countries in Asia. The values in the World Bank Group tables are rounded. All calculations are based on raw data, so due to the nuances of rounding, in some places illusory inconsistencies of indicators arose, with a size of 0.01 year.

World Bank Group (2024)
Countries and territories	2024				Historical data													recovery from COVID-19: 2019→2024	
Countries and territories	All	Male	Female	Sex gap	2014	2014 →2019	2019	2019 →2020	2020	2020 →2021	2021	2021 →2022	2022	2022 →2023	2023	2023 →2024	2024	recovery from COVID-19: 2019→2024	
Hong Kong SAR, China	85.39	82.70	88.22	5.52	83.94	1.22	85.16	0.34	85.50	0.04	85.53	−1.87	83.66	1.59	85.25	0.15	85.39	0.24	(Hong Kong)
Kuwait	84.58	83.80	85.40	1.60	79.08	2.89	81.97	−3.21	78.76	−0.02	78.74	1.85	80.59	2.60	83.19	1.39	84.58	2.61	(Kuwait)
Japan	84.04	81.09	87.13	6.04	83.59	0.77	84.36	0.20	84.56	−0.11	84.45	−0.45	84.00	0.04	84.04	0.00	84.04	−0.32	(Japan)
South Korea	83.63	80.80	86.60	5.80	81.72	1.50	83.23	0.20	83.43	0.10	83.53	−0.85	82.68	0.75	83.43	0.20	83.63	0.40	(South Korea)
Singapore	83.35	81.20	85.60	4.40	82.50	1.10	83.60	−0.05	83.54	−0.45	83.09	−0.20	82.90	0.20	83.10	0.25	83.35	−0.25	(Singapore)
Macao SAR, China	83.33	80.60	86.20	5.60	83.02	0.91	83.93	0.20	84.13	−0.40	83.73	−0.65	83.08	0.10	83.18	0.15	83.33	−0.60	(Macau)
Israel	83.20	81.10	85.40	4.30	82.15	0.65	82.80	−0.16	82.65	−0.15	82.50	0.20	82.70	0.50	83.20	0.00	83.20	0.39	(Israel)
United Arab Emirates	83.07	82.17	84.32	2.15	81.99	0.61	82.60	−0.66	81.94	−2.85	79.08	1.40	80.49	2.42	82.91	0.16	83.07	0.47	(United Arab Emirates)
Qatar	82.52	81.78	83.48	1.70	81.39	1.55	82.94	−2.54	80.41	0.67	81.08	0.77	81.86	0.51	82.37	0.15	82.52	−0.42	(Qatar)
Cyprus	81.82	79.84	83.80	3.96	81.34	0.12	81.45	−0.22	81.23	−0.66	80.57	−0.14	80.43	1.21	81.65	0.17	81.82	0.37	(Cyprus)
Bahrain	81.42	80.86	82.13	1.27	80.21	0.26	80.47	−1.79	78.68	−0.60	78.08	2.91	80.99	0.29	81.28	0.14	81.42	0.95	(Bahrain)
Maldives	81.28	79.95	83.00	3.05	78.19	1.52	79.71	−0.99	78.71	−0.66	78.05	2.71	80.76	0.28	81.04	0.24	81.28	1.58	(Maldives)
Oman	80.25	78.72	82.05	3.33	79.03	0.92	79.95	−2.18	77.76	−1.79	75.97	1.94	77.91	2.12	80.03	0.21	80.25	0.30	(Oman)
Saudi Arabia	78.98	77.33	81.33	4.00	77.12	1.20	78.31	−0.72	77.60	−0.51	77.09	0.22	77.31	1.42	78.73	0.25	78.98	0.67	(Saudi Arabia)
Armenia	78.32	75.10	81.70	6.60	74.87	1.35	76.22	−2.85	73.38	−1.10	72.28	2.49	74.77	2.70	77.47	0.85	78.32	2.10	(Armenia)
China	78.02	75.25	80.97	5.72	76.71	1.23	77.94	0.08	78.02	0.10	78.12	0.08	78.20	−0.25	77.95	0.06	78.02	0.08	(China)
Jordan	77.98	75.89	80.33	4.44	74.61	2.26	76.86	−1.28	75.58	−1.38	74.20	2.88	77.09	0.73	77.81	0.17	77.98	1.12	(Jordan)
Lebanon	77.94	75.88	79.86	3.98	78.15	0.06	78.21	−1.91	76.30	−2.65	73.65	4.35	78.00	−0.19	77.82	0.13	77.94	−0.26	(Lebanon)
Iran	77.85	76.00	79.81	3.81	75.64	1.22	76.86	−2.71	74.14	−0.39	73.75	3.05	76.80	0.85	77.65	0.20	77.85	1.00	(Iran)
Sri Lanka	77.67	74.45	80.75	6.30	75.76	0.94	76.70	0.23	76.93	−0.65	76.28	1.02	77.30	0.18	77.48	0.19	77.67	0.97	(Sri Lanka)
Turkey	77.42	74.62	80.34	5.72	76.45	1.28	77.74	−1.21	76.53	−0.80	75.72	1.87	77.59	−0.43	77.16	0.27	77.42	−0.32	(Turkey)
Malaysia	76.82	74.45	79.52	5.07	75.34	0.56	75.90	0.16	76.06	−2.14	73.92	1.53	75.44	1.21	76.66	0.16	76.82	0.92	(Malaysia)
Thailand	76.56	72.34	80.98	8.64	76.28	0.92	77.20	0.13	77.33	0.27	77.61	−2.31	75.29	1.12	76.41	0.15	76.56	−0.63	(Thailand)
Brunei	75.50	73.49	77.73	4.24	74.86	0.19	75.05	0.06	75.11	−0.25	74.87	−1.95	72.92	2.41	75.33	0.17	75.50	0.45	(Brunei)
Bangladesh	74.93	73.30	76.67	3.36	70.02	2.61	72.62	−1.20	71.42	−0.32	71.10	3.16	74.27	0.41	74.67	0.26	74.93	2.31	(Bangladesh)
Vietnam	74.74	70.05	79.38	9.33	73.89	0.33	74.21	1.17	75.38	−1.24	74.14	0.36	74.50	0.09	74.59	0.15	74.74	0.53	(Vietnam)
Georgia	74.66	69.75	79.23	9.49	73.11	1.06	74.17	−0.66	73.51	−1.87	71.64	2.51	74.14	0.35	74.50	0.16	74.66	0.49	(Georgia (country))
Azerbaijan	74.58	71.71	77.28	5.58	71.93	1.36	73.29	−2.98	70.31	0.69	71.00	3.13	74.12	0.30	74.43	0.15	74.58	1.29	(Azerbaijan)
Kazakhstan	74.53	70.27	78.52	8.25	71.42	2.24	73.66	−2.46	71.19	−1.06	70.13	3.37	73.50	0.90	74.40	0.13	74.53	0.87	(Kazakhstan)
North Korea	73.74	71.55	75.88	4.33	72.45	0.48	72.93	−0.14	72.78	0.65	73.44	0.20	73.64	0.00	73.64	0.10	73.74	0.81	(North Korea)
World	73.48	71.11	75.97	4.86	71.78	1.09	72.87	−0.69	72.18	−0.97	71.21	1.75	72.97	0.36	73.33	0.15	73.48	0.61	
Russia	73.44	68.26	78.88	10.62	70.74	2.34	73.08	−1.75	71.34	−1.44	69.90	2.65	72.55	0.71	73.25	0.19	73.44	0.36	(Russia)
Bhutan	73.26	71.57	75.27	3.70	70.50	1.50	72.00	0.25	72.25	0.19	72.45	0.31	72.75	0.22	72.97	0.29	73.26	1.26	(Bhutan)
Syria	72.56	70.21	74.92	4.71	65.49	5.48	70.97	0.97	71.94	0.47	72.42	0.37	72.79	−0.67	72.12	0.44	72.56	1.59	(Syria)
Uzbekistan	72.53	69.56	75.55	5.98	70.97	1.12	72.09	−0.63	71.46	0.22	71.68	0.47	72.15	0.24	72.39	0.14	72.53	0.44	(Uzbekistan)
Iraq	72.42	70.50	74.18	3.68	69.68	1.57	71.25	−1.59	69.65	1.05	70.70	1.33	72.04	0.29	72.32	0.10	72.42	1.18	(Iraq)
Kyrgyzstan	72.40	68.40	76.60	8.20	70.40	1.20	71.60	0.20	71.80	0.10	71.90	0.15	72.05	0.20	72.25	0.15	72.40	0.80	(Kyrgyzstan)
Mongolia	72.40	67.92	77.10	9.18	70.58	0.47	71.05	0.30	71.35	0.30	71.65	0.26	71.90	0.22	72.12	0.28	72.40	1.34	(Mongolia)
India	72.23	70.73	73.86	3.13	68.93	1.81	70.75	−0.59	70.16	−2.87	67.28	4.42	71.70	0.31	72.00	0.23	72.23	1.49	(India)
Tajikistan	71.93	69.68	74.14	4.46	69.70	1.27	70.96	−2.36	68.61	0.99	69.59	1.97	71.56	0.23	71.79	0.14	71.93	0.97	(Tajikistan)
Egypt	71.81	69.65	74.01	4.36	69.91	1.30	71.21	−1.42	69.79	−0.81	68.98	2.03	71.01	0.62	71.63	0.17	71.81	0.59	(Egypt)
Indonesia	71.29	69.16	73.43	4.27	69.29	1.06	70.35	−1.53	68.82	−1.36	67.45	3.47	70.92	0.22	71.15	0.14	71.29	0.94	(Indonesia)
Cambodia	70.82	68.15	73.36	5.21	69.12	1.01	70.13	−0.07	70.06	−0.76	69.30	1.23	70.53	0.14	70.67	0.15	70.82	0.69	(Cambodia)
Nepal	70.64	69.09	72.14	3.05	67.81	1.49	69.30	−0.19	69.11	−0.72	68.39	1.70	70.09	0.27	70.35	0.28	70.64	1.34	(Nepal)
Turkmenistan	70.20	67.00	73.01	6.01	69.00	0.40	69.41	−0.56	68.85	0.51	69.35	0.56	69.91	0.16	70.07	0.13	70.20	0.80	(Turkmenistan)
Philippines	69.95	66.99	72.96	5.97	69.31	0.37	69.68	0.42	70.10	−3.42	66.67	2.80	69.47	0.36	69.83	0.11	69.95	0.27	(Philippines)
Yemen	69.44	67.37	71.55	4.18	68.00	−1.44	66.57	−0.13	66.44	−0.42	66.02	1.93	67.95	1.34	69.30	0.14	69.44	2.87	(Yemen)
Laos	69.22	67.02	71.53	4.51	66.35	1.56	67.91	0.43	68.34	−0.53	67.81	0.91	68.72	0.25	68.96	0.26	69.22	1.31	(Laos)
Palestine	69.21	65.22	74.25	9.03	72.78	3.03	75.81	−0.81	75.00	−1.11	73.89	2.77	76.66	−11.49	65.17	4.04	69.21	−6.60	(Palestine)
Timor-Leste	67.90	66.27	69.67	3.41	65.03	1.47	66.50	0.42	66.92	−0.72	66.20	1.17	67.37	0.32	67.69	0.22	67.90	1.41	(Timor-Leste)
Pakistan	67.80	65.46	70.32	4.86	65.37	1.36	66.73	−1.03	65.70	0.07	65.77	1.64	67.42	0.23	67.65	0.15	67.80	1.07	(Pakistan)
Myanmar	67.09	63.99	70.38	6.39	64.99	1.46	66.46	0.16	66.61	−1.06	65.55	0.95	66.51	0.38	66.89	0.21	67.09	0.64	(Myanmar)
Afghanistan	66.29	64.70	67.81	3.11	62.26	0.68	62.94	−1.49	61.45	−1.04	60.42	5.20	65.62	0.42	66.03	0.25	66.29	3.35	(Afghanistan)

== WHO (2019) ==
Estimation of the World Health Organization for 2019.

World Health Organization (2019)
Countries	Life expectancy at birth					HALE at birth					Life expectancy at age 60					HALE at age 60					
Countries	All	M	F	FΔM	Δ 2000	All	M	F	FΔM	Δ 2000	All	M	F	FΔM	Δ 2000	All	M	F	FΔM	Δ 2000	
Japan	84.47	81.70	87.15	5.45	2.94	73.58	72.09	75.01	2.92	2.47	26.66	24.28	28.86	4.58	2.03	20.42	18.79	21.95	3.16	1.57	(Japan)
Singapore	83.90	81.81	85.98	4.17	5.38	73.80	72.66	74.89	2.23	4.39	25.83	24.05	27.51	3.46	4.35	20.21	18.98	21.38	2.40	3.41	(Singapore)
South Korea	83.69	80.56	86.56	6.00	7.83	72.50	70.62	74.19	3.57	5.95	26.13	23.55	28.30	4.75	5.80	19.66	17.88	21.16	3.28	4.13	(South Korea)
Israel	82.57	80.74	84.32	3.58	4.03	71.51	71.17	71.78	0.61	3.17	24.88	23.61	26.02	2.41	2.93	18.91	18.29	19.47	1.18	2.13	(Israel)
Kuwait	82.50	80.27	86.43	6.16	4.92	70.48	69.73	71.79	2.06	3.23	25.47	23.77	28.37	4.60	3.34	18.66	17.64	20.36	2.72	2.04	(Kuwait)
Cyprus	82.18	80.20	84.16	3.96	3.35	71.13	70.69	71.55	0.86	2.66	24.36	22.91	25.77	2.86	2.53	18.56	17.79	19.31	1.52	1.93	(Cyprus)
United Arab Emirates	81.41	80.98	82.29	1.31	3.29	69.69	70.24	68.69	−1.55	2.24	23.55	23.52	23.68	0.16	2.17	17.29	17.59	16.95	−0.64	1.39	(United Arab Emirates)
Jordan	79.79	79.73	80.34	0.61	7.07	68.36	69.59	67.32	−2.27	5.11	23.48	24.08	23.36	−0.72	4.75	17.33	18.03	16.95	−1.08	3.17	(Jordan)
Lebanon	79.29	76.92	81.47	4.55	3.57	67.41	66.73	68.03	1.30	2.41	23.18	21.46	24.66	3.20	2.46	16.93	15.83	17.88	2.05	1.40	(Lebanon)
Qatar	78.90	78.49	79.84	1.35	8.52	67.91	68.37	66.54	−1.83	6.15	21.83	21.76	21.86	0.10	6.65	15.83	16.07	15.34	−0.73	4.41	(Qatar)
Iran	77.78	76.36	79.40	3.04	4.29	66.56	66.60	66.60	0.00	3.33	22.19	21.79	22.71	0.92	1.64	16.46	16.44	16.59	0.15	0.98	(Iran)
Turkey	77.62	75.09	80.13	5.04	4.31	67.24	66.63	67.80	1.17	3.61	21.26	19.46	22.85	3.39	0.94	16.03	15.03	16.93	1.90	0.61	(Turkey)
Western Pacific	77.49	74.51	80.70	6.19	5.53	68.35	66.70	70.13	3.43	4.53	21.75	19.68	23.84	4.16	2.73	16.64	15.38	17.90	2.52	1.90	
Sri Lanka	77.45	74.32	80.33	6.01	5.94	67.09	65.35	68.69	3.34	4.69	21.76	19.93	23.19	3.26	2.58	16.05	14.97	16.90	1.93	1.66	(Sri Lanka)
China	77.31	74.58	80.36	5.78	6.47	68.45	66.99	70.08	3.09	5.32	20.98	19.09	22.98	3.89	3.02	16.06	14.98	17.21	2.23	2.08	(China)
Saudi Arabia	76.93	76.45	77.75	1.30	6.36	66.15	66.37	65.63	−0.74	4.94	20.65	20.67	20.69	0.02	3.38	15.16	15.22	15.09	−0.13	2.28	(Saudi Arabia)
Thailand	76.92	73.30	80.64	7.34	5.91	67.14	64.85	69.50	4.65	4.93	23.43	21.99	24.74	2.75	2.71	17.68	16.82	18.46	1.64	1.94	(Thailand)
Brunei	76.68	75.25	78.16	2.91	1.17	67.08	66.34	67.82	1.48	0.79	20.92	20.07	21.72	1.65	1.34	15.82	15.20	16.39	1.19	0.96	(Brunei)
Bahrain	76.03	75.39	76.86	1.47	6.34	65.80	66.30	64.72	−1.58	4.75	19.06	18.58	19.58	1.00	4.21	14.03	13.94	14.08	0.14	2.78	(Bahrain)
Azerbaijan	75.80	73.38	78.09	4.71	10.57	66.62	65.57	67.63	2.06	8.81	20.86	19.55	21.95	2.40	4.86	16.15	15.49	16.72	1.23	3.54	(Azerbaijan)
Armenia	75.67	70.82	79.79	8.97	4.05	66.48	63.56	68.96	5.40	3.51	20.10	16.81	22.61	5.80	2.12	15.45	13.30	17.09	3.79	1.56	(Armenia)
Maldives	75.45	74.41	76.86	2.45	5.63	66.93	66.91	66.89	−0.02	5.54	17.90	17.32	18.64	1.32	0.84	14.08	13.82	14.41	0.59	0.86	(Maldives)
Oman	75.29	73.09	78.85	5.76	3.63	65.53	64.58	66.76	2.18	2.99	19.51	17.83	21.90	4.07	1.78	14.56	13.49	16.09	2.60	1.26	(Oman)
Malaysia	74.68	72.71	76.99	4.28	1.67	65.49	64.68	66.47	1.79	1.36	19.80	18.97	20.79	1.82	1.48	14.90	14.50	15.42	0.92	1.07	(Malaysia)
Bangladesh	73.95	72.64	75.26	2.62	8.59	63.98	64.12	63.86	−0.26	7.32	20.56	19.92	21.18	1.26	3.18	15.42	15.35	15.49	0.14	2.32	(Bangladesh)
Bhutan	73.93	72.87	75.13	2.26	7.94	64.13	64.19	64.04	−0.15	6.89	20.12	19.66	20.61	0.95	1.88	15.20	15.15	15.25	0.10	1.37	(Bhutan)
Georgia	73.85	69.10	78.44	9.34	2.78	64.85	61.61	67.98	6.37	2.08	19.05	16.01	21.50	5.49	0.98	14.60	12.47	16.31	3.84	0.51	(Georgia (country))
Tajikistan	73.81	72.28	75.37	3.09	8.16	64.91	64.42	65.42	1.00	7.12	20.10	19.57	20.62	1.05	2.73	15.67	15.54	15.80	0.26	2.07	(Tajikistan)
Vietnam	73.71	69.51	78.00	8.49	1.84	65.39	62.68	68.16	5.48	1.65	19.55	16.82	21.96	5.14	0.64	15.12	13.28	16.74	3.46	0.40	(Vietnam)
Kyrgyzstan	73.59	69.92	77.14	7.22	7.66	64.84	62.68	66.93	4.25	6.73	19.46	17.19	21.40	4.21	2.91	15.13	13.69	16.37	2.68	2.29	(Kyrgyzstan)
Russia	73.22	68.17	78.00	9.83	8.06	63.72	60.41	66.84	6.43	7.01	19.93	16.80	22.19	5.39	3.54	14.92	12.75	16.49	3.74	2.64	(Russia)
Kazakhstan	73.20	68.84	77.20	8.36	8.85	63.97	61.26	66.45	5.19	7.60	19.15	16.43	21.16	4.73	3.25	14.49	12.75	15.77	3.02	2.39	(Kazakhstan)
World	73.12	70.61	75.70	5.09	6.35	63.45	62.33	64.59	2.26	5.33	21.03	19.41	22.54	3.13	2.16	15.80	14.87	16.67	1.80	1.52	
Iraq	72.90	70.26	75.37	5.11	3.42	62.41	61.17	63.52	2.35	2.72	19.63	18.02	20.91	2.89	0.65	14.50	13.42	15.36	1.94	0.26	(Iraq)
North Korea	72.32	69.34	75.30	5.96	9.80	64.51	62.89	66.15	3.26	8.63	18.86	17.04	20.39	3.35	2.37	14.71	13.64	15.64	2.00	1.83	(North Korea)
Uzbekistan	72.27	70.15	74.28	4.13	10.59	63.62	62.85	64.32	1.47	8.92	17.82	16.51	18.89	2.38	4.45	13.80	13.06	14.40	1.34	3.30	(Uzbekistan)
Egypt	71.59	68.97	74.30	5.33	2.44	62.52	61.66	63.40	1.74	2.10	17.18	15.30	18.94	3.64	−0.66	13.02	11.93	14.05	2.12	−0.65	(Egypt)
Indonesia	71.40	69.55	73.26	3.71	4.19	63.29	62.48	64.09	1.61	3.86	18.06	16.96	19.04	2.08	0.71	13.79	13.17	14.34	1.17	0.55	(Indonesia)
South-East Asia	71.37	69.61	73.23	3.62	7.30	61.82	61.38	62.28	0.90	6.48	18.90	17.88	19.89	2.01	1.37	14.03	13.58	14.46	0.88	1.10	
Nepal	71.36	69.56	73.10	3.54	5.99	61.53	61.01	62.08	1.07	5.47	18.60	17.64	19.51	1.87	0.81	13.73	13.32	14.12	0.80	0.73	(Nepal)
Mongolia	70.75	66.27	75.47	9.20	7.55	62.00	58.89	65.28	6.39	6.36	18.49	16.11	20.52	4.41	3.34	14.21	12.55	15.62	3.07	2.45	(Mongolia)
India	70.73	69.18	72.41	3.23	7.53	60.88	60.70	61.08	0.38	6.75	18.52	17.60	19.44	1.84	1.01	13.60	13.27	13.94	0.67	0.90	(India)
Eastern Mediterranean	70.18	68.70	71.75	3.05	4.73	60.52	60.34	60.69	0.35	3.84	18.88	18.24	19.48	1.24	1.27	14.06	13.85	14.26	0.41	0.78	
Cambodia	69.56	66.87	72.16	5.29	10.46	61.25	59.77	62.68	2.91	9.47	17.32	15.72	18.57	2.85	2.00	13.16	12.16	13.93	1.77	1.49	(Cambodia)
Philippines	69.43	66.05	73.22	7.17	−0.54	61.26	59.28	63.47	4.19	0.01	17.48	15.45	19.52	4.07	−1.39	13.34	12.06	14.63	2.57	−0.90	(Philippines)
Syria	69.17	65.37	73.49	8.12	−1.92	59.66	57.46	62.21	4.75	−2.42	18.71	18.19	19.31	1.12	1.40	14.19	14.05	14.41	0.36	0.86	(Syria)
Turkmenistan	69.14	65.70	72.54	6.84	3.57	61.13	59.04	63.20	4.16	3.30	18.23	16.33	19.79	3.46	0.97	14.24	13.02	15.23	2.21	0.75	(Turkmenistan)
Myanmar	68.81	65.69	72.04	6.35	9.43	60.66	58.83	62.56	3.73	8.24	17.92	16.06	19.61	3.55	3.12	13.61	12.42	14.69	2.27	2.29	(Myanmar)
Timor-Leste	68.50	67.02	70.08	3.06	5.63	59.97	58.96	61.07	2.11	5.99	17.96	17.25	18.65	1.40	0.02	13.55	13.14	13.95	0.81	0.25	(Timor-Leste)
Laos	68.36	66.14	70.72	4.58	10.08	60.60	59.43	61.84	2.41	8.87	17.48	16.35	18.63	2.28	2.76	13.53	12.88	14.19	1.31	2.06	(Laos)
Pakistan	67.03	66.30	67.79	1.49	5.62	57.80	58.12	57.50	−0.62	4.61	18.01	17.90	18.11	0.21	1.67	13.28	13.51	13.07	−0.44	1.12	(Pakistan)
Yemen	66.90	63.95	70.01	6.06	3.82	57.36	56.40	58.35	1.95	3.21	17.98	17.01	18.81	1.80	1.12	13.56	13.17	13.90	0.73	0.76	(Yemen)
Afghanistan	61.22	60.04	62.55	2.51	7.40	52.31	51.87	52.84	0.97	6.28	15.16	15.41	14.99	−0.42	2.02	11.03	11.31	10.84	−0.47	1.17	(Afghanistan)

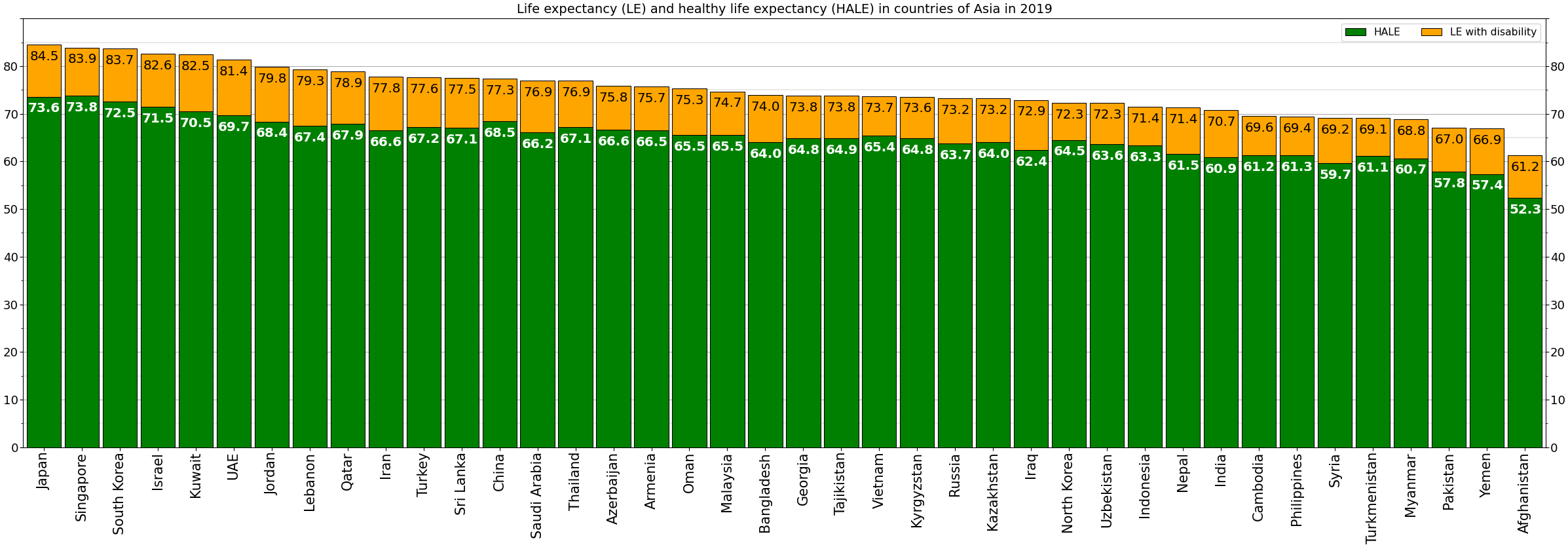
Life expectancy and HALE in countries of Asia in 2019

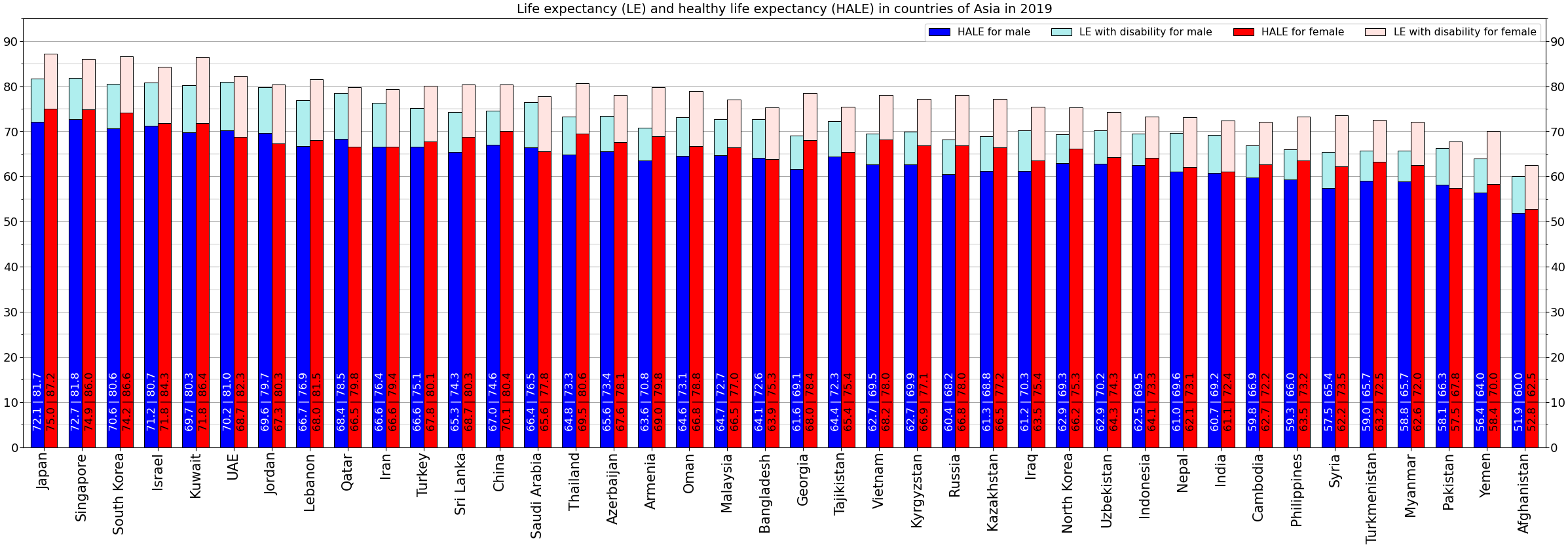
Elaboration by sex

Interactive chart of male and female life expectancy in Asia and Oceania as defined by WHO for 2019. Open the original chart and hover over chart elements. The squares of bubbles are proportional to population according to estimation of the UN for 2019.

== Charts ==
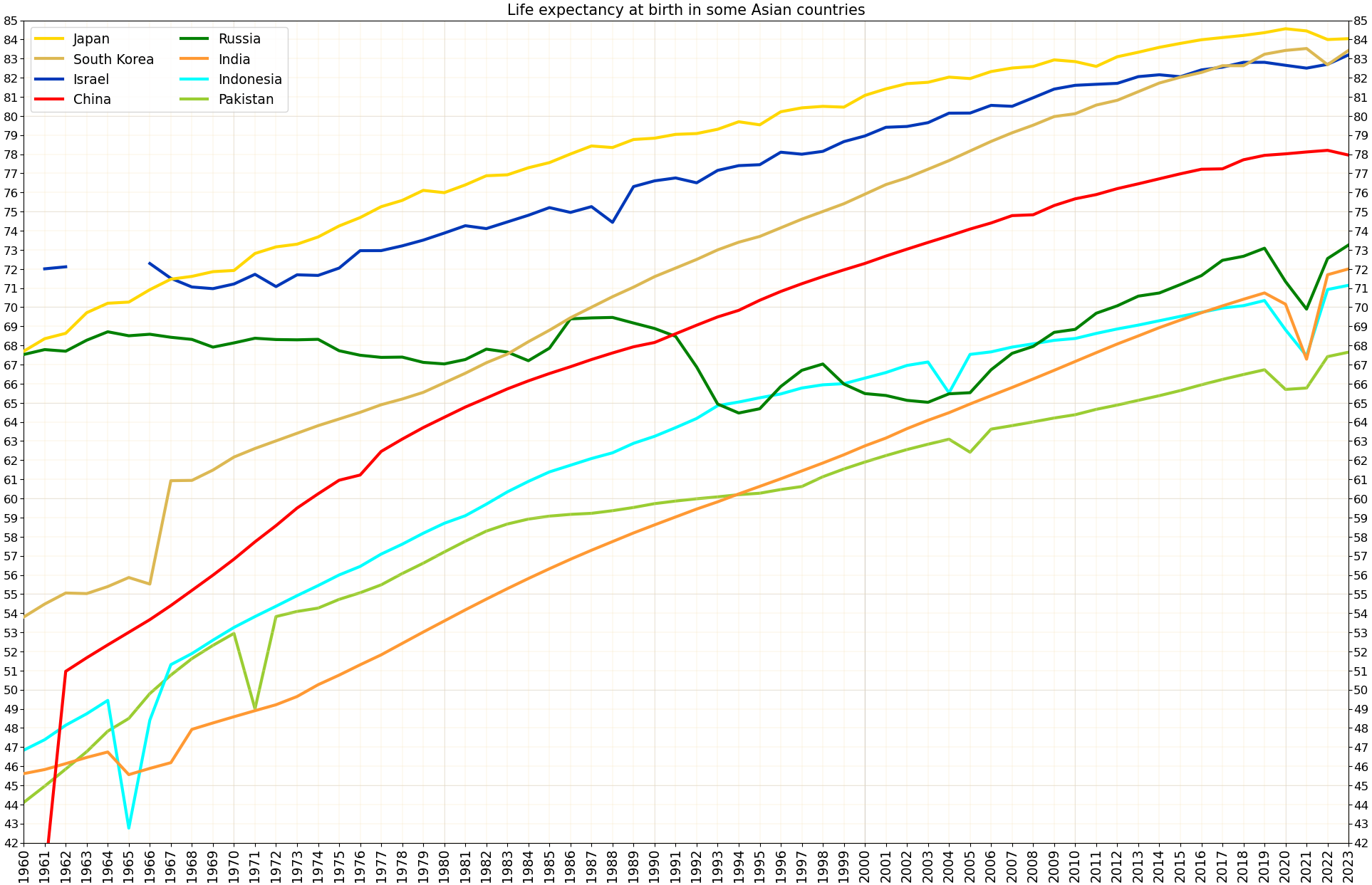
Life expectancy in some Asian countries

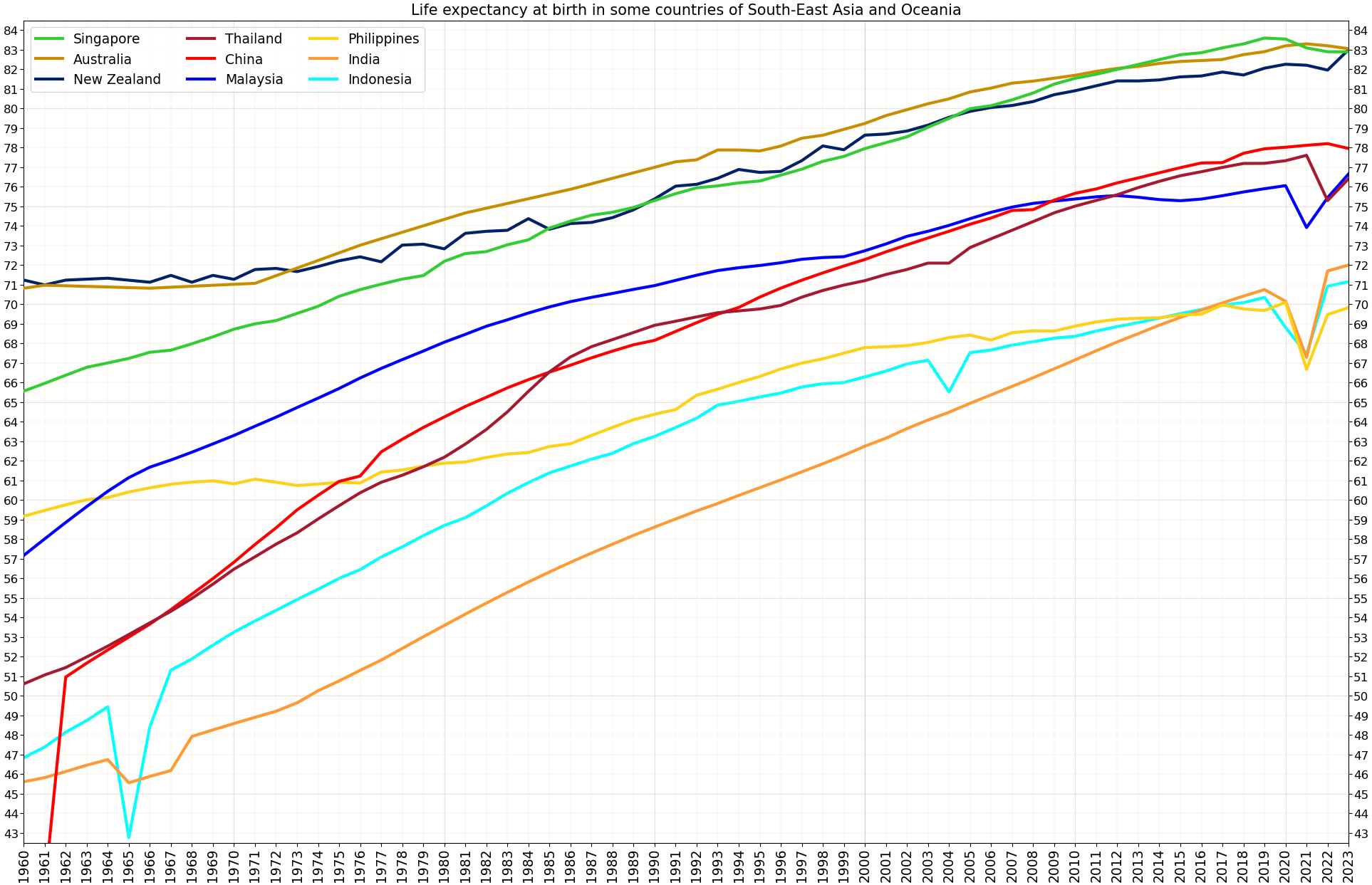
Life expectancy in some countries of South-East Asia and Oceania

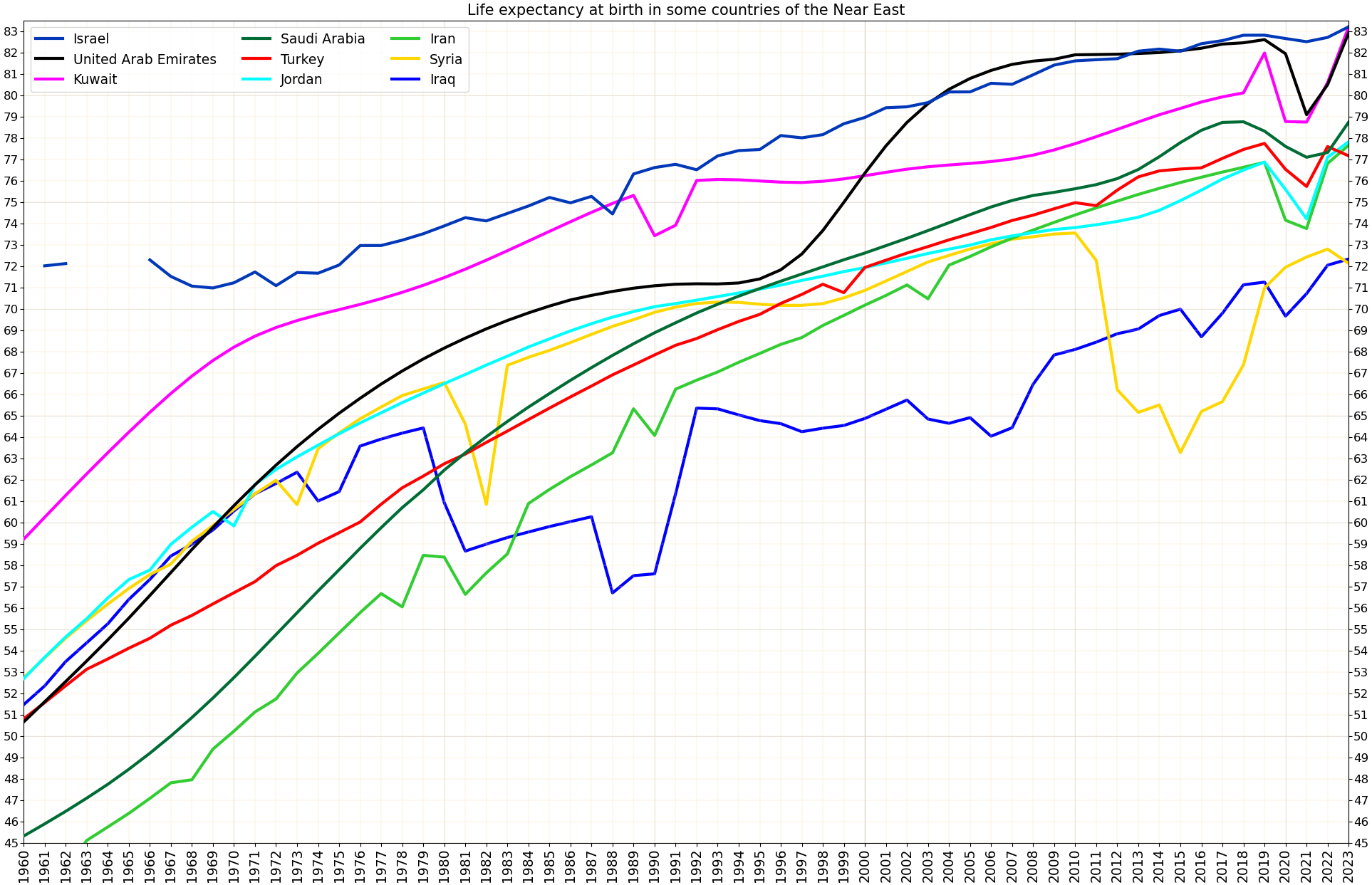
Life expectancy at birth in some countries of the Near East

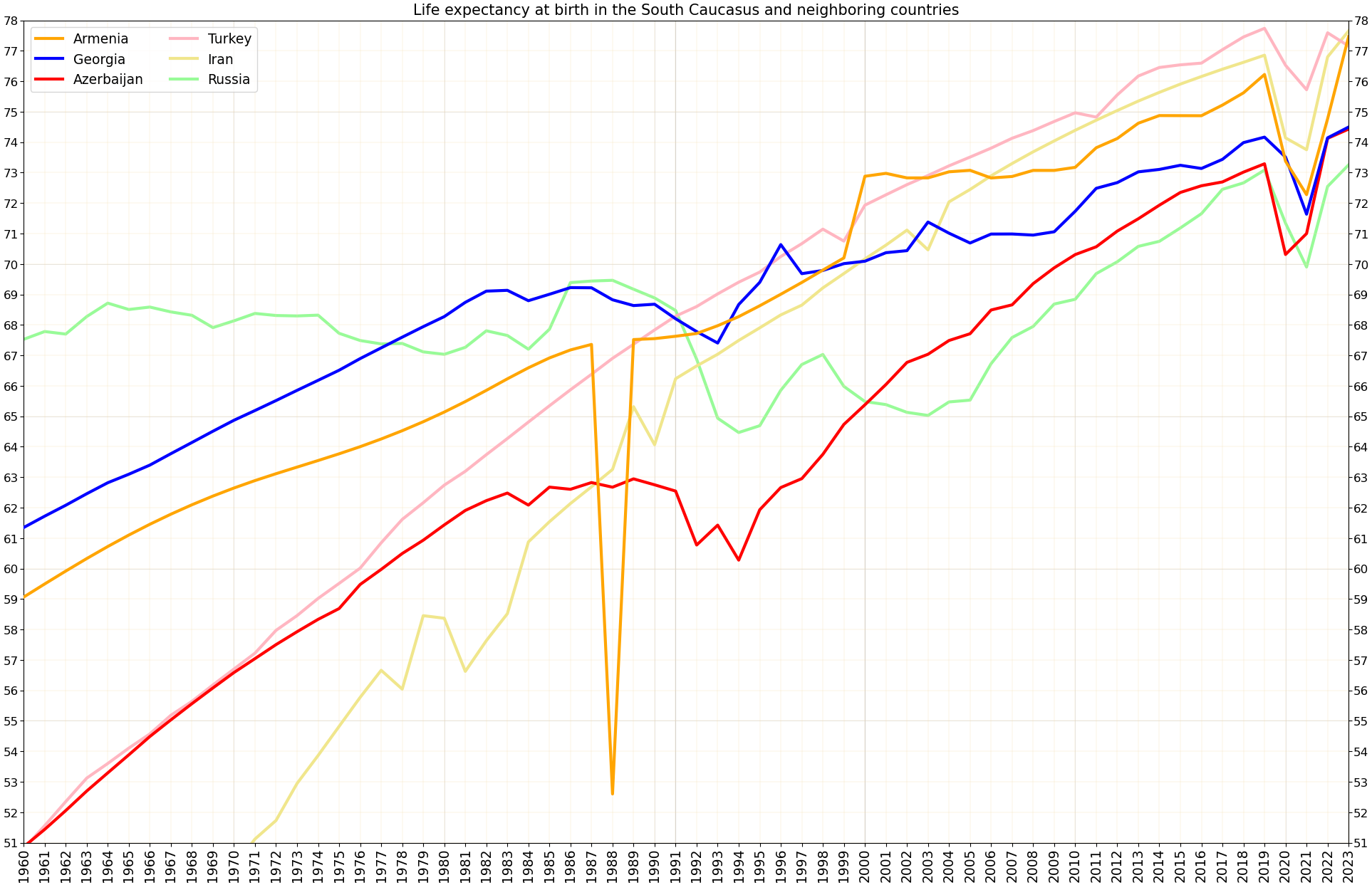
life expectancy in countries of the South Caucasus and neighboring countries

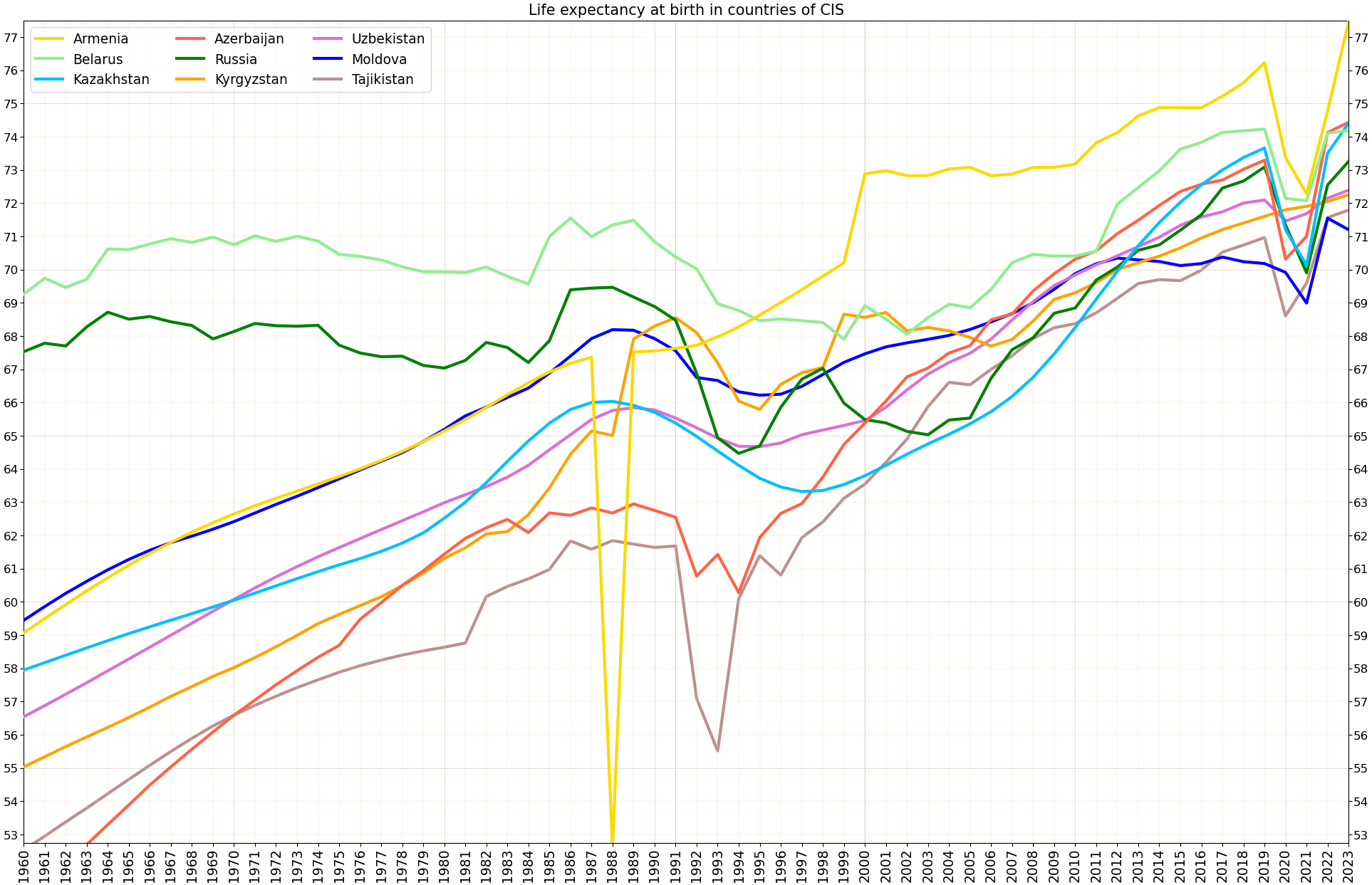
Life expectancy at birth in countries of CIS, that includes many Asian countries
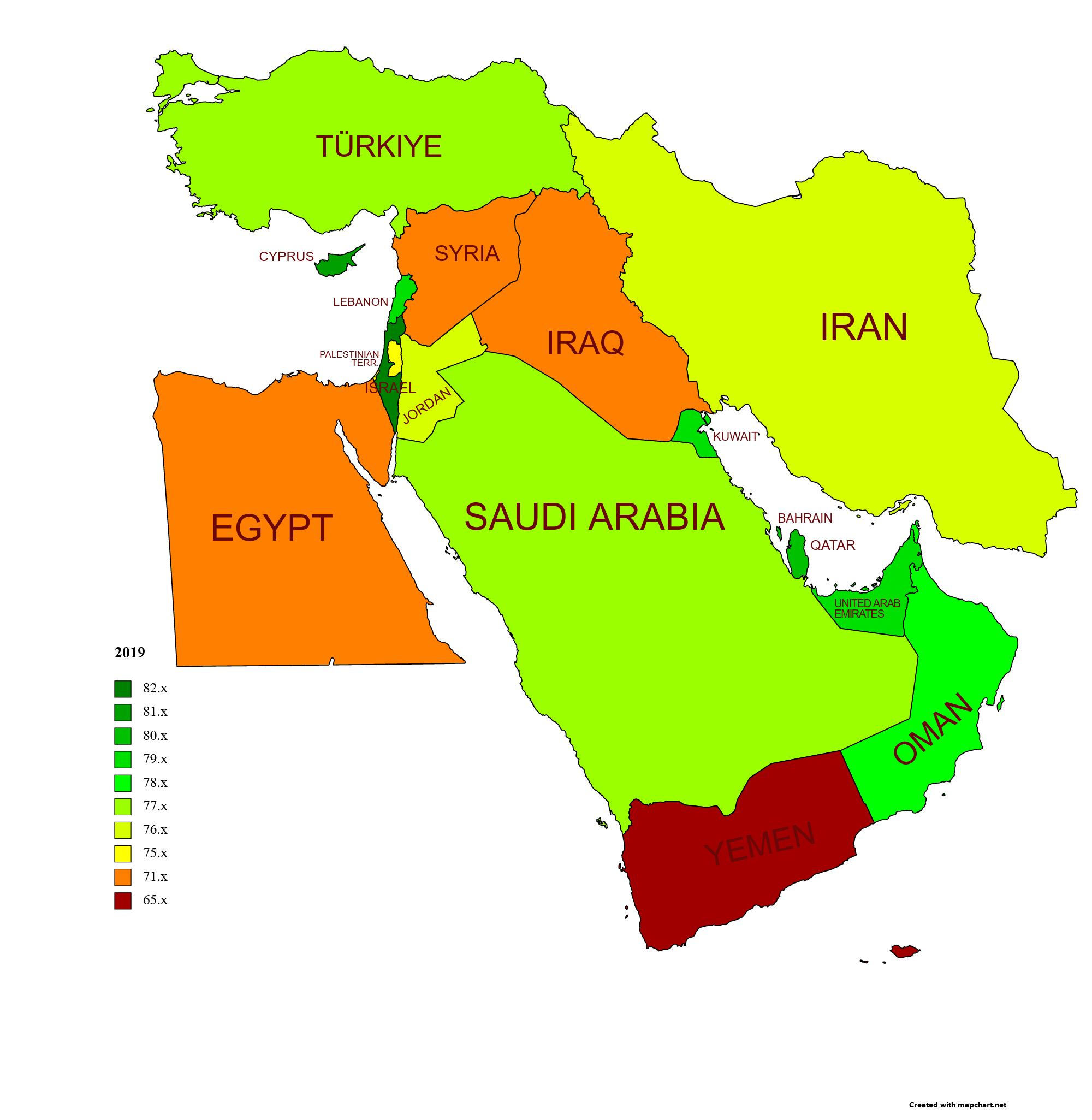
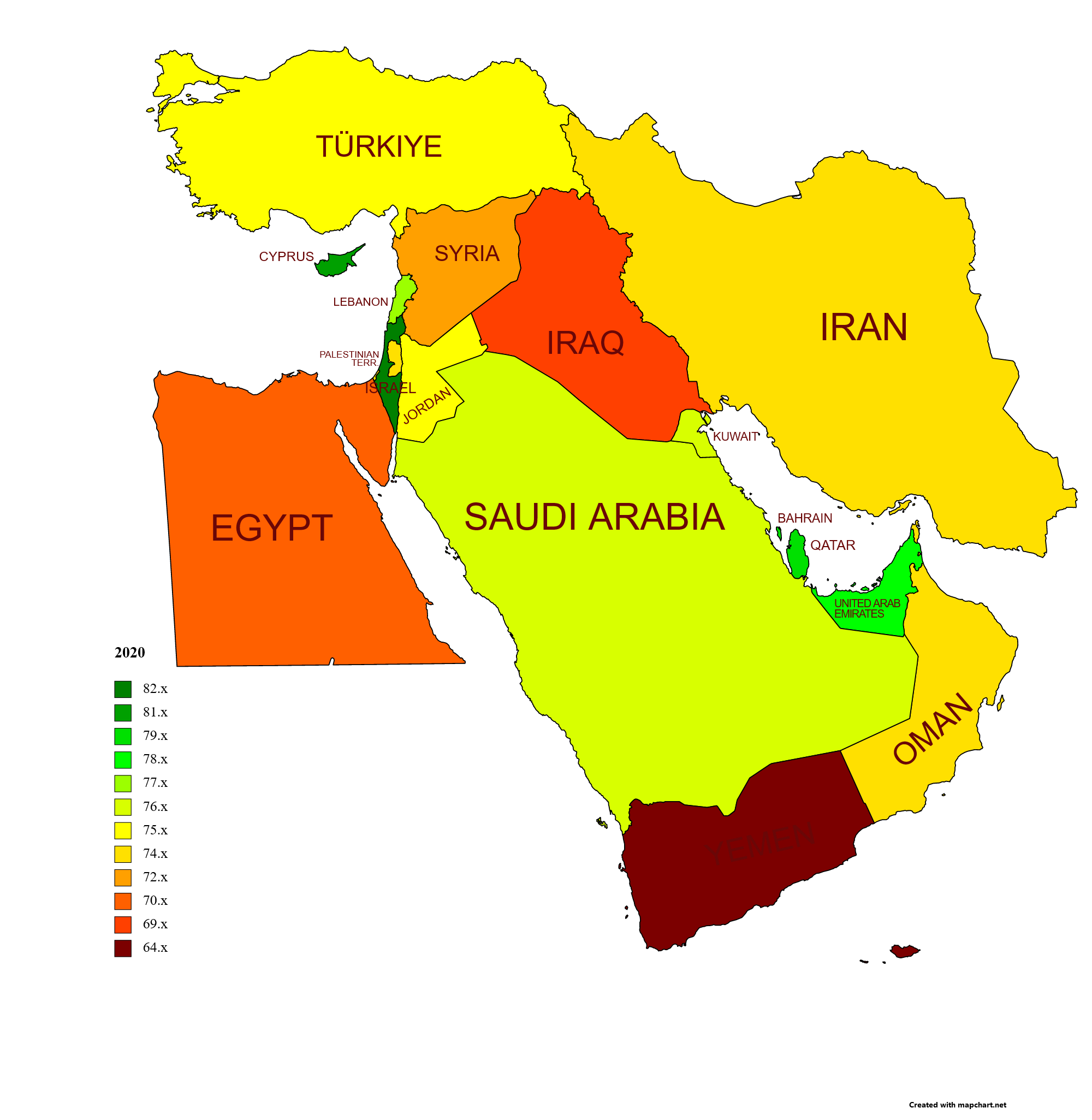
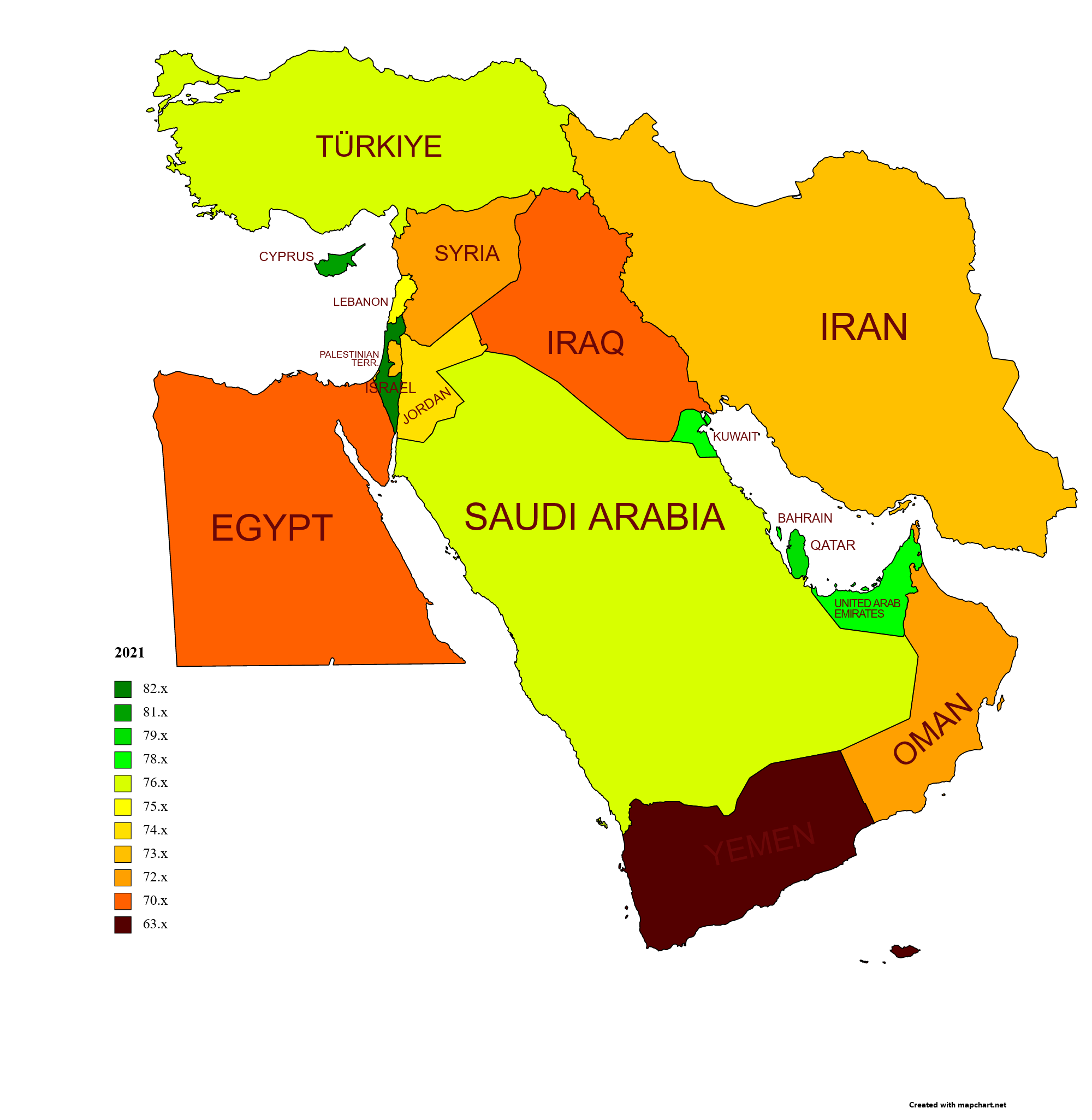
Change in life expectancy in the Middle East from 2019 to 2021

== See also ==
- List of countries by life expectancy
- List of countries in the Middle East by life expectancy
- List of Asian regions by life expectancy
- List of Japanese prefectures by life expectancy
- List of South Korean regions by life expectancy
- List of Chinese administrative divisions by life expectancy
- List of cities in China by life expectancy
- List of Indian states by life expectancy at birth
- List of regions of Israel and Palestine by life expectancy
- List of regions of Kazakhstan by life expectancy
- List of Tajikistani regions by life expectancy
- List of federal subjects of Russia by life expectancy
- List of Turkish provinces by life expectancy
- List of oldest people
- Longevity
- Life extension
