= Proposed Japanese invasion of Australia during World War II =

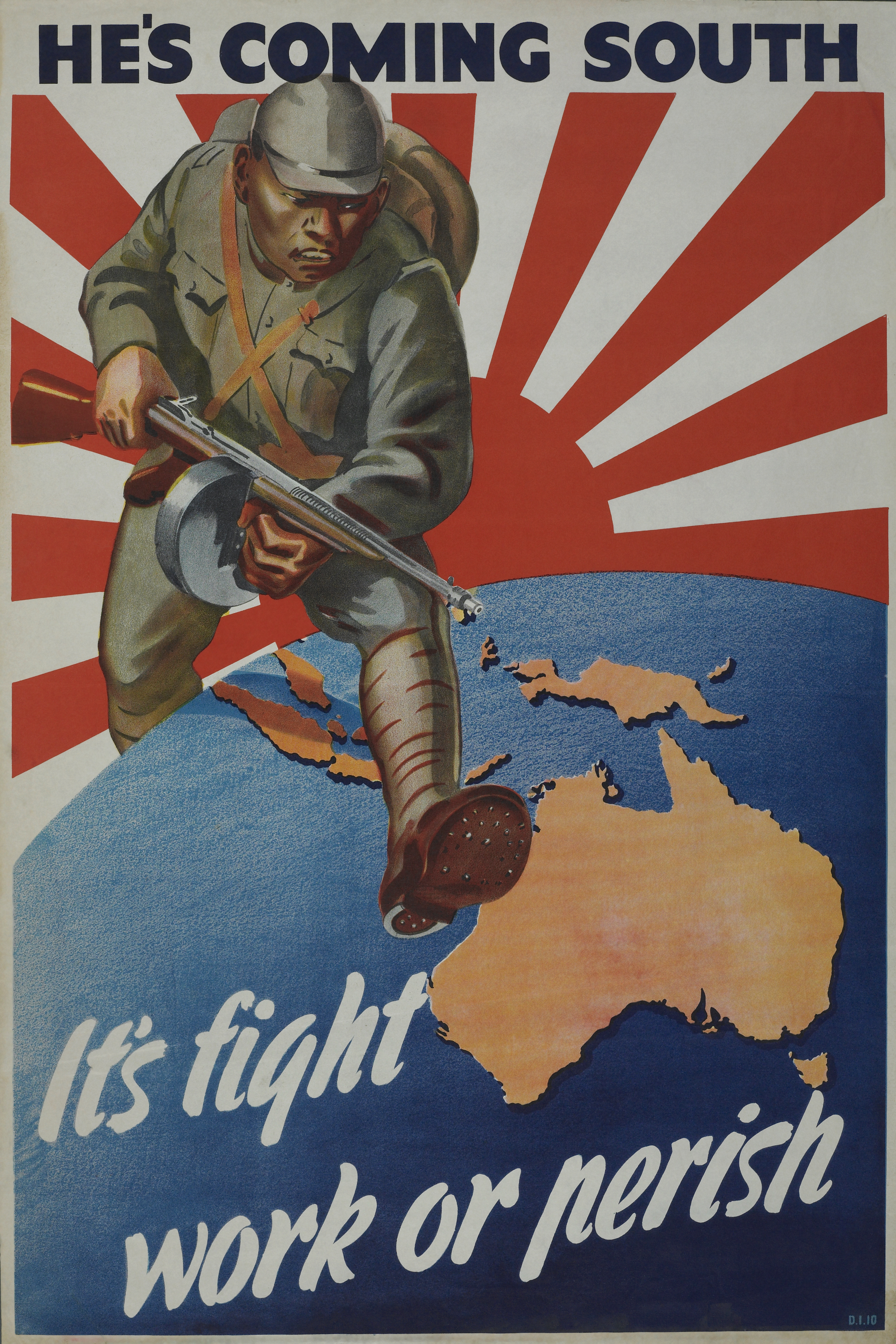
An Australian propaganda poster from 1942 referring to the threat of Japanese invasion. This poster was criticised for being alarmist when it was released and was banned by the Queensland Government.

In early 1942, elements of the Imperial Japanese Navy (IJN) proposed an invasion of mainland Australia. This proposal was opposed by the Imperial Japanese Army and Prime Minister Hideki Tojo, who regarded it as being unfeasible, given Australia's geography and the strength of the Allied defences. Instead, the Japanese military adopted a strategy of isolating mainland Australia from the United States by advancing through the South Pacific. This offensive was abandoned following the Battle of the Coral Sea and the Battle of Midway in May and June 1942, and all subsequent Japanese operations in the vicinity of Australia were undertaken to slow the advance of Allied forces.

This is all despite key battles, including the Battle of Milne Bay, where the Japanese suffered from the first defeat of a land battle at the hands of an Australian Brigade, and the Kokoda Campaign, where the Australians prevented the Japanese reaching Port Moresby, the capital of the Australian Territory of Papua, in late 1942. The Australian townships of Darwin and Broome were attacked by air a number of times, and the fact that Sydney Harbor was also attacked by two midget submarines certainly would have given the Australians and Americans the impression that the Japanese were considering invasion as a strong possibility. This also supported the strategic planning of the Brisbane Line.

Former Australian War Memorial principal historian Dr Peter Stanley states that the Japanese "army dismissed the idea as 'gibberish', knowing that troops sent further south would weaken Japan in China and in Manchuria against a Soviet threat. Not only did the Japanese army condemn the plan, but the Navy General Staff also deprecated it, unable to spare the million tonnes of shipping the invasion would have consumed."

After the fall of Singapore in February 1942, the Australian government, the military and the people were deeply alarmed by the possibility of a Japanese invasion. Widespread fear led to an expansion of Australia's military and war economy, as well as closer links with the United States.

== Japanese proposals ==
=== Debate between the Army and Navy ===
Japan's success in the early months of the Pacific War led elements of the Imperial Japanese Navy to propose invading Australia. In December 1941 the Navy proposed including an invasion of Northern Australia as one of Japan's "stage two" war objectives after Southeast Asia was conquered. This proposal was most strongly pushed by Captain Sadatoshi Tomioka, the head of the Navy General Staff's Planning section, on the grounds that the United States was likely to use Australia as a base to launch a counter-offensive in the South-West Pacific. The Navy headquarters argued that this invasion could be carried out by a small landing force as this area of Australia was lightly defended and isolated from Australia's main population centres. There was not universal support for this proposal within the Navy, and Isoroku Yamamoto, the commander of the Combined Fleet, consistently opposed it.

The Japanese Army opposed the Navy's proposal as being impractical. The Army's focus was on defending the perimeter of Japan's conquests, and it believed that invading Australia would over-extend these defence lines. The Army was not willing to release the large number of troops it calculated was needed for such an operation from the Kwantung Army in Manchuria, as it both feared that the Soviet Union would enter the Pacific War and wanted to preserve an option for Japan to invade Siberia.

Prime Minister Hideki Tojo also consistently opposed invading Australia. Instead, Tojo favoured a policy of forcing Australia to submit by cutting its lines of communication with the US. In his last interview before being executed for war crimes Tojo stated,

We never had enough troops to [invade Australia]. We had already far out-stretched our lines of communication. We did not have the armed strength or the supply facilities to mount such a terrific extension of our already over-strained and too thinly spread forces. We expected to occupy all New Guinea, to maintain Rabaul as a holding base, and to raid Northern Australia by air. But actual physical invasion—no, at no time.

In speeches before the Diet of Japan on 12 January and 16 February 1942, Tojo claimed Japanese policy was to "eradicate the British colonies at Hong Kong and in the Malay Peninsula as these were 'evil bases used against East Asia', and turn these places into strongholds for the defence of Greater East Asia. Burma and the Philippines would get independence if they co-operated with Japan; the Netherlands East Indies and Australia would be crushed if they resisted; but if they recognised Japan's true intentions would receive help in promoting their welfare and development."

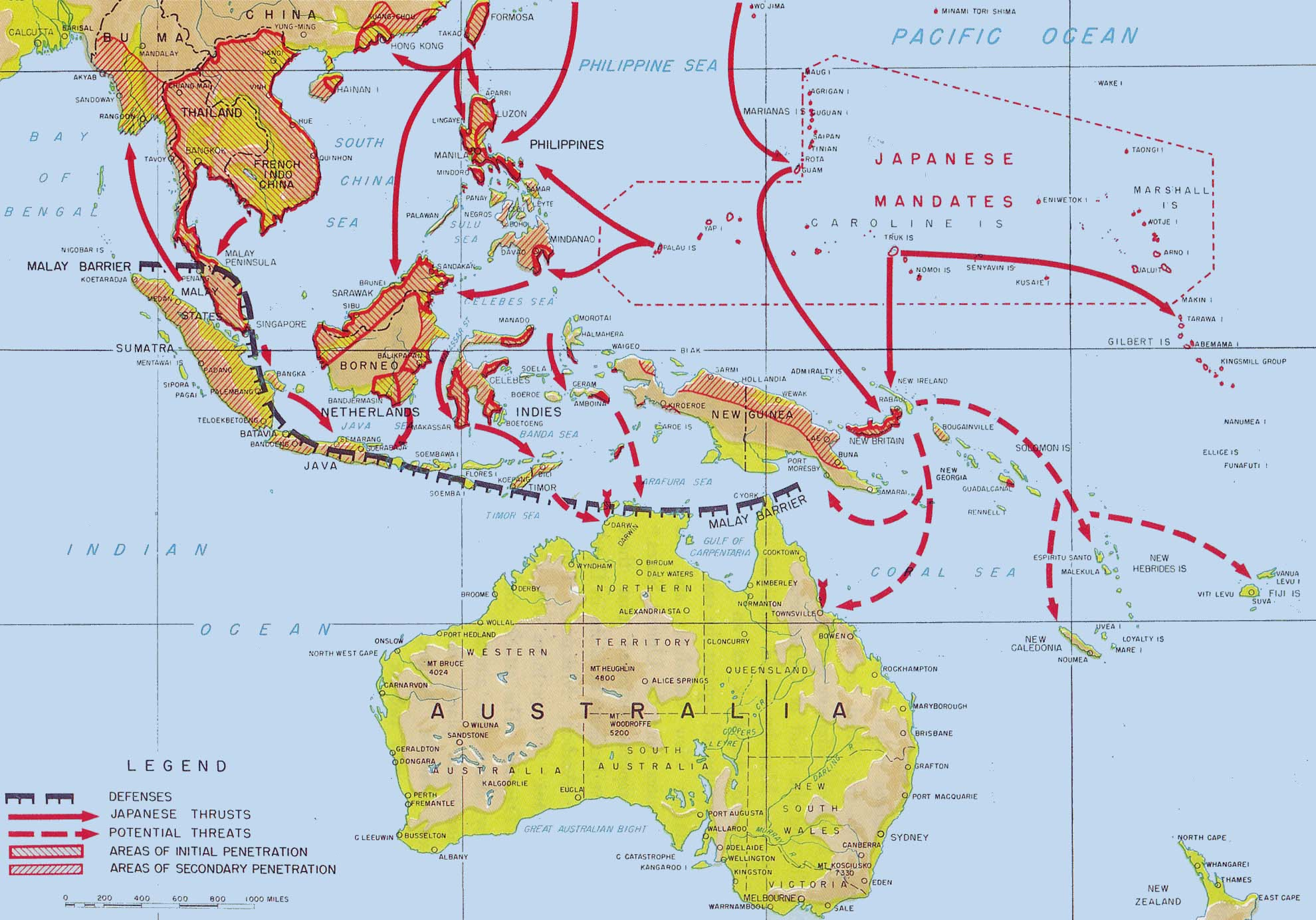
Japanese advances in the Southwest Pacific and Southeast Asia areas during the first five months of the Pacific Campaign of World War II. The proposed offensive on Fiji, Samoa, and New Caledonia is depicted in the lower right corner.

The Army's and the Navy's calculations of the number of troops needed to invade Australia differed greatly and formed a central area of discussion. In December 1941 the Navy calculated that a force of three divisions (between 45,000 and 60,000 men) would be sufficient to secure Australia's north-eastern and north-western coastal areas. In contrast, the Army calculated that a force of at least ten divisions (between 150,000 and 250,000 men) would be needed. The Army's planners estimated that transporting this force to Australia would require 1.5 to 2 million tons of shipping, which would have required delaying the return of requisitioned merchant shipping.

This invasion force would have been larger than the entire force used to conquer South-East Asia. The Army also rejected the Navy's proposal of limiting an invasion of Australia to securing enclaves in the north of the country as being unrealistic given the likely Allied counter-offensives against these positions. Due to its experience in China the Army believed that any invasion of Australia would have to involve an attempt to conquer the entire Australian continent, something which was beyond Japan's abilities.

The possibility of invading Australia was discussed by the Japanese Army and Navy on several occasions in February 1942. On 6 February the Navy Ministry formally proposed a plan in which eastern Australia would be invaded at the same time other Japanese forces captured Fiji, Samoa, and New Caledonia, and this was again rejected by the Army.

On 14 February, the day before Singapore was captured, the Army and Navy sections of the Imperial General Headquarters again discussed invading Australia. During this discussion Captain Tomioka argued that it would be possible to take Australia with a "token force". This statement was labelled "so much gibberish" in the Imperial General Headquarters' secret diary. General Tomoyuki Yamashita:

He said that after he had taken Singapore, he wanted to discuss with Tojo a plan for the invasion of Australia... Tojo turned down the plan, making the excuse of lengthened supply lines, which would be precarious and open to enemy attack...

In late February, the dispute between the Army and Navy was settled with a decision to isolate rather than invade Australia. The Army continued to maintain its view that invading Australia was impractical, but agreed to extend Japan's strategic perimeter and cut Australia off from the US by invading Fiji, Samoa, and New Caledonia in the so-called Operation FS. The question of whether to invade Australia was discussed by Imperial Headquarters for the last time on 27 February and in this meeting the Army stated that it believed that Australia was defended by a 600,000-strong military force.

On 4 March, the Imperial Headquarters formally agreed to a "Fundamental Outline of Recommendations for Future War Leadership", which relegated the option of invading Australia as a "future option" only if all other plans went well. This plan was presented to the Emperor by Prime Minister Hideki Tōjō and in effect ended discussion of invading Australia. The FS Operation was not implemented, due to Japan's defeats in the Battle of the Coral Sea and Battle of Midway, and was cancelled on 11 July 1942.

=== Subsequent Japanese operations in the South-West Pacific ===
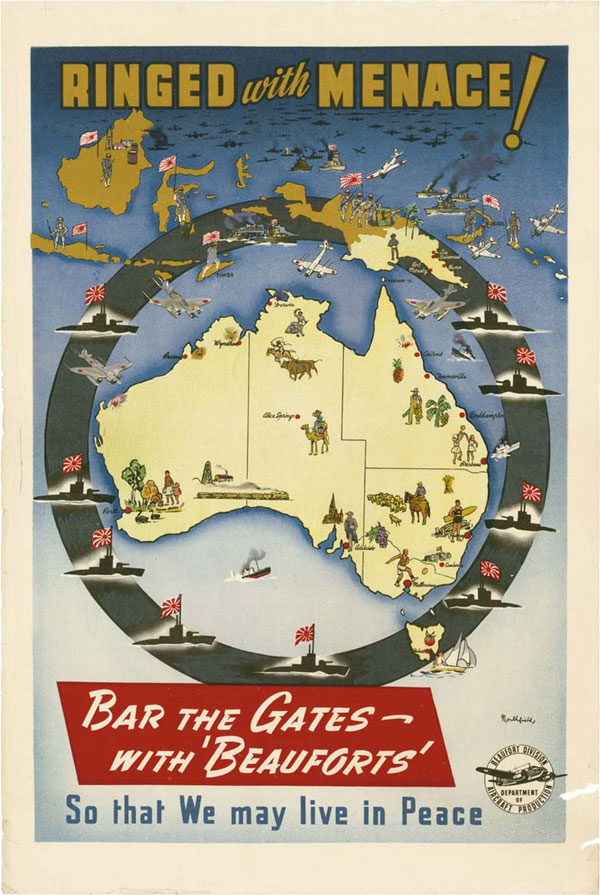
An Australian World War II propaganda poster produced in 1943 emphasising the threats posed by Japanese forces, including the Australian-controlled territories of Papua and New Guinea.

As the option of invading Australia was rejected in February 1942 and was not revisited, the Japanese attacks on Australia during the war were not precursors to invasion, as is sometimes claimed. The large air raid on Darwin on 19 February 1942 and the Attack on Broome on 3 March were conducted to prevent the Allies from using these towns as bases to contest the invasion of the Dutch East Indies and was not related to an invasion. According to Frei:

The generals of the Army General Staff, and the Prime Minister of Japan, General Hideki Tojo, did not see a need to commit massive troop resources to the conquest of Australia, with the massive logistical problems that would produce. The generals were confident that Australia could be bullied into surrender to Japan by isolating it completely from the United States and by applying intense psychological pressure.

The dozens of subsequent air raids on Northern Australia in 1942 and 1943 were mainly small and aimed to prevent the Allied air units based there from attacking Japanese positions. The Attack on Sydney Harbour in May 1942 had the goal of diverting Allied forces away from Midway Island prior to the Japanese attempt to capture it and the subsequent Japanese submarine campaigns off the Australian east coast in 1942 and 1943 were attempts to break the supply line between Australia and New Guinea during the New Guinea Campaign.

The Japanese attempt to capture Port Moresby in New Guinea by advancing along the Kokoda Track and landing at Milne Bay between July and September 1942 aimed to capture the town to complete Japan's defensive perimeter in the region. Once secured, Port Moresby was to have been used as a base from which Japanese aircraft could dominate the Torres Strait and Coral Sea, and not to support an invasion of Australia.

A small Japanese reconnaissance unit carried out a brief landing on the Australian mainland during January 1944. Matsu Kikan ("Pine Tree"), a joint army-navy intelligence unit, landed to assess reports that the Allies had begun to build major new bases on the northernmost coast of the Kimberley region of Western Australia, facing the Timor Sea. After leaving their base at Kupang, West Timor, the unit – comprising 10 Japanese personnel in a commandeered fishing vessel crewed by West Timorese civilians – made brief visits to the uninhabited Ashmore Reef and Browse Island.

On 19 January, Matsu Kikan entered York Sound on the mainland. While smoke was seen in hills to the east, the Japanese vessel was anchored and camouflaged with tree branches. Landing parties went ashore near the mouth of the Roe River. They reconnoitred the surrounding area for about two hours and filmed it with an 8 mm camera. The following day, Matsu Kikan personnel again reconnoitred the area, before returning to Kupang. Matsu Kikan did not see any signs of recent human activity, and little of military significance was learnt from the mission.

An officer involved with the mission reportedly returned to Japan shortly afterward, where he suggested landing 200 Japanese convicts in Australia, to launch a guerrilla campaign. This suggestion was not adopted. According to historian Peter Stanley, "No historian of standing believes the Japanese had a plan to invade Australia, there is not a skerrick of evidence."

=== Settlement plans ===
In its 1943 report An Investigation of Global Policy with the Yamato Race as Nucleus, the Japanese government's Institute of Population Problems envisaged that Australia and New Zealand would be incorporated into the Greater East Asia Co-Prosperity Sphere, with Japanese settlers to be placed on agricultural lands.

== Australian fear of invasion ==
After the fall of Singapore, Prime Minister of Australia John Curtin compared its loss to the Battle of Dunkirk. The Battle of Britain occurred after Dunkirk; "the fall of Singapore opens the Battle for Australia", Curtin said, which threatened the Commonwealth, the United States, and the entire English-speaking world. Not knowing that Japan did not plan to invade Australia and in February 1942 could not successfully do so, the Australian government and people expected an invasion soon. The fear was greatest until June 1942. Curtin said on 16 February:

The protection of this country is no longer that of a contribution to a world at war but the resistance to an enemy threatening to invade our own shore ... It is now work or fight as we have never worked or fought before ... On what we do now depends everything we may like to do when this bloody test has been survived.

Former Head of the Centre for Historical Research at the National Museum of Australia Dr Peter Stanley has been critical of the oft-repeated, widespread myth that Japan intended to invade Australia, commenting "the invasion myth helps justify the parochial view Australians took of their war effort."

== In fiction ==
The 1984 alternate history novel The Bush Soldiers by John Hooker depicts a successful Japanese invasion of Australia and the last-ditch resistance effort made by a handful of Australian and British troops.

In John Birmingham's 2004 alternative history novel Designated Targets, Imperial Japan launches an invasion of northern Australia.

The 2001 alternate history essay collection Rising Sun Victorious edited by Peter G. Tsouras has a chapter "Samurai Down Under" by John H. Gill that posits a briefly-successful Japanese invasion of the Queensland coast at Cape York, Cairns and Townsville.

In the TV series The Man in the High Castle, the Japanese Empire has successfully invaded Australia and incorporated it into the Japanese Pacific States.

== See also ==
- Axis victory in World War II
- Battle for Australia
- Brisbane Line
- Battle of Christmas Island
- Cocos Islands during World War II
- Kantokuen
- Operation Mo
