= An Investigation of Global Policy with the Yamato Race as Nucleus =

1943 Japanese government report on racial theory and policy

An Investigation of Global Policy with the Yamato Race as Nucleus (Japanese: 大和民族を中核とする世界政策の検討, romanized: Yamato Minzoku wo Chūkaku to suru Sekai Seisaku no Kentō) was a Japanese government report created by the Ministry of Health and Welfare's Institute of Population Problems (now the National Institute of Population and Social Security Research), and completed on July 1, 1943.

The document, comprising six volumes totaling 3,127 pages, deals with race theory in general, and the rationale behind policies adopted by wartime Japan towards other races, while also providing a vision of the Asia-Pacific under Japanese control.

The document was written in an academic style, surveying Western philosophy on race from the writings of Plato and Aristotle to modern German social scientists, such as Karl Haushofer. A connection between racialism, nationalism and imperialism was also claimed, with the conclusion, drawn by citing both British and German sources, that overseas expansionism was essential not only for military and economic security, but for preserving racial consciousness. Concerns pertaining to the cultural assimilation of second and third generation immigrants into foreign cultures were also mentioned.

== Discovery ==
The document was classified and largely forgotten until 1981, when portions were discovered in a used bookstore in Japan, and subsequently publicized by being used as source material for a chapter in historian John W. Dower's book War Without Mercy: Race and Power in the Pacific War. In 1982 the Ministry of Health and Welfare re-issued the full six-volume version along with another two volumes entitled The Influence of War upon Population as a reference work for historians.

== Impact ==
Although external Japanese propaganda during World War II emphasized Pan-Asianist and anti-colonial themes, specifically anti-Western imperialist themes, domestic propaganda always took Japanese superiority over other Asians for granted. However, Japan never had an overarching racial theory for Asia until well into the 1930s—following the Japanese invasion of China, military planners decided that they should raise Japanese racial consciousness in order to forestall the potential assimilation of Japanese colonists.

The document was written by the Ministry of Health and Welfare, which was not a powerful arm of the bureaucracy at the time. It had to essentially censor its own recommendations so as not to violate official doctrine and policy, and could not even obtain a public hearing for its ideas; so, the document would likely have had little impact on Japanese policy.

== Themes ==
=== Colonization and living space ===
Some statements in the document coincide with the then-publicly espoused concept of Yamato people; however, much of the work borrowed heavily from National-Socialist racial, political and economic theories, including mention of the "Jewish question" and inclusion of racist anti-Jewish political cartoons, although Japan had a mostly negligible and overlooked Jewish minority. The term "Blood and Soil" was frequently used, though usually in quotes, as if to indicate its alien origin.

The authors rationalized Japanese colonization of most of the Eastern Hemisphere including New Zealand and Australia, with projected populations by the 1950s, as "securing the living space of the Yamato race", a very clear reflection of the National-Socialist concept of Lebensraum.

=== Racial supremacy ===
Japanese belief as being the superior Asian country was also common by the Meiji era, with discrimination even being enacted against racial minorities such as the Ryūkyū people. However, where the document deviated from National-Socialist ideology was in its use of Confucianism and the metaphor of the patriarchical family. This metaphor, with the non-Japanese Asians serving as children of the Japanese, rationalized the "equitable inequality" of Japanese political, economic, and cultural dominance. Just as a family has harmony and reciprocity, but with a clear-cut hierarchy, the Japanese, as a purportedly racially superior people, were destined to rule Asia "eternally" and become the supreme dominant leader of all humanity and ruler of the world. The term "proper place" was used frequently throughout the document.

The document left open whether Japan was destined eventually to become head of the global family of nations.

=== Jinshu and Minzoku ===
The document drew an explicit distinction between jinshu (人種) or Rasse (English: race), and minzoku (民族) or Volk (English: people), describing a minzoku as "a natural and spiritual community bound by a common destiny". However, the authors went on to assert that blood mattered. It approved of Hitler's concern about finding the "Germanness" of his people. It made explicit calls, sometimes approaching Nazi attitudes, for eugenic improvements, calling for the medical profession not to concentrate on treating the sickly and the weak, and calling for mental and physical training and selective marriages to improve the population.

== See also ==
- Ethnic issues in Japan
- Hakkō ichiu – "eight cords, one roof"
- Honorary Aryan
- "Manifesto of Race"
- Scientific racism
- Shinmin no Michi
- Tanaka Memorial
- Yamato people
- Yamato nationalism
- Yamato-damashii – "the Japanese spirit"

== Sources ==
- Dower, John (1986). War without Mercy: Race and Power in the Pacific War. Knopf Doubleday Publishing Group. ISBN 978-0-307-81614-6. OCLC 794457316.
