= List of Japanese prefectures by life expectancy =

This is a list of Japanese prefectures by life expectancy.

Japan is officially divided into 47 top-level administrative divisions: 43 prefectures proper, 2 urban prefectures (Osaka and Kyoto), 1 "circuit" (Hokkaido), and 1 "metropolis" (Tokyo). Although different in name, they are functionally the same.

In Japan, the maximum life expectancy was recorded in 2020 (84.7 years). After that, there were two years of decline, due to the COVID-19 pandemic, totalling 0.6 years. In 2023, an increase, albeit symbolic, was again recorded.

According to the National Institute of Population and Social Security Research, which publishes the Japanese Mortality Database, in 2023 the total life expectancy was 84.14 years (81.10 for male and 87.16 for female). A detailed visualization of the figures from this database is below.

The Ministry of Health, Labour and Welfare gives figures for 2023 that differ only by hundredths of a year: 81.09 for male and 87.14 for female. Meanwhile, healthy life expectancy is 72.57 years for male and 75.45 years for female (for 2022). The ministry states that life expectancy and healthy life expectancy have been increasing almost in parallel since 2001 (the gap between them remains constant).

The main cause of death is declared to be cancer, which, masking aging, puts an end to life for 25.93% of men and 19.09% of women. If an effective treatment for all cancers is developed and the number of deaths from them is reduced to zero, it will give an increase in life expectancy by 3.16 years for male and 2.69 years for female. This is close to the assessment of South Korean demographers for their country, who claim that a complete victory over cancer will increase life expectancy in South Korea by 3.3 years.

Estimates of life expectancy in Japan from international agencies:

- The United Nations for 2023: 84.71 years total (81.69 for male, 87.74 for female).
- The World Bank Group for 2023: 84.04 years total (81.09 for male, 87.14 for female).
- The WHO publishes its estimates later than other leading statistical agencies. In 2019 life expectancy in Japan was estimated as 84.47 years total (81.70 for male, 87.15 for female). And healthy life expectancy was 73.58 years (72.09 for male, 75.01 for female).

== The Japanese Mortality Database (2013–2023) ==
Japan had peak of life expectancy in 2020. So this year is emphasized in the table below.

prefecture	2020				historical data												2023				2013 →2023
prefecture	overall	male	female	sex gap	2013	2013 →2018	2018	2018 →2019	2019	2019 →2020	2020	2020 →2021	2021	2021 →2022	2022	2022 →2023	overall	male	female	sex gap	2013 →2023
Japan	84.71	81.58	87.73	6.15	83.43	0.89	84.32	0.14	84.46	0.25	84.71	−0.13	84.58	−0.48	84.10	0.04	84.14	81.10	87.16	6.06	0.71
Shiga	85.71	82.88	88.39	5.51	84.20	0.95	85.15	0.20	85.35	0.36	85.71	−0.11	85.60	−0.51	85.09	0.10	85.19	82.31	88.06	5.75	0.99
Kyoto	85.54	82.34	88.49	6.15	83.88	1.19	85.07	0.13	85.20	0.34	85.54	−0.15	85.39	−0.75	84.64	0.25	84.89	81.71	87.92	6.21	1.01
Nagano	85.51	82.54	88.39	5.85	84.47	0.81	85.28	0.06	85.34	0.17	85.51	0.16	85.67	−0.51	85.16	0.12	85.28	82.58	87.96	5.38	0.81
Nara	85.45	82.45	88.18	5.73	83.77	1.12	84.89	0.33	85.22	0.23	85.45	−0.25	85.20	−0.55	84.65	0.44	85.09	82.38	87.61	5.23	1.32
Okayama	85.39	82.08	88.53	6.45	83.67	1.00	84.67	0.34	85.01	0.38	85.39	−0.22	85.17	−0.49	84.68	−0.09	84.59	81.45	87.67	6.22	0.92
Kumamoto	85.37	81.96	88.51	6.55	84.24	0.84	85.08	−0.07	85.01	0.36	85.37	−0.16	85.21	−0.74	84.47	0.24	84.71	81.55	87.71	6.16	0.47
Hiroshima	85.37	82.17	88.39	6.22	83.81	0.73	84.54	0.33	84.87	0.50	85.37	−0.18	85.19	−0.56	84.63	−0.09	84.54	81.45	87.58	6.13	0.73
Tottori	85.31	81.76	88.68	6.92	83.30	1.38	84.68	−0.56	84.12	1.19	85.31	−0.54	84.77	−0.26	84.51	−0.30	84.21	80.97	87.37	6.40	0.91
Ishikawa	85.25	81.97	88.34	6.37	83.96	1.01	84.97	−0.01	84.96	0.29	85.25	0.04	85.29	−0.63	84.66	−0.16	84.50	81.40	87.50	6.10	0.54
Ōita	85.22	81.84	88.37	6.53	83.84	0.99	84.83	0.20	85.03	0.19	85.22	−0.25	84.97	−0.33	84.64	−0.18	84.46	81.37	87.37	6.00	0.62
Toyama	85.22	82.08	88.15	6.07	83.75	0.93	84.68	0.16	84.84	0.38	85.22	−0.39	84.83	−0.56	84.27	−0.03	84.24	81.29	87.11	5.82	0.49
Kanagawa	85.04	82.06	87.99	5.93	83.87	0.80	84.67	0.19	84.86	0.18	85.04	−0.12	84.92	−0.55	84.37	0.16	84.53	81.58	87.52	5.94	0.66
Gifu	85.03	82.24	87.68	5.44	83.48	0.89	84.37	0.12	84.49	0.54	85.03	−0.32	84.71	−0.46	84.25	0.11	84.36	81.59	87.08	5.49	0.88
Hyōgo	85.02	81.78	88.05	6.27	83.52	1.16	84.68	0.20	84.88	0.14	85.02	−0.22	84.80	−0.23	84.57	0.14	84.71	81.68	87.59	5.91	1.19
Yamanashi	85.01	81.76	88.24	6.48	83.80	0.85	84.65	−0.16	84.49	0.52	85.01	0.00	85.01	−0.59	84.42	−0.07	84.35	81.31	87.46	6.15	0.55
Shimane	84.98	81.71	88.12	6.41	83.53	1.27	84.80	0.09	84.89	0.09	84.98	0.13	85.11	−0.45	84.66	0.07	84.73	81.32	88.14	6.82	1.20
Tokyo	84.97	81.86	87.96	6.10	83.58	0.99	84.57	0.21	84.78	0.19	84.97	−0.17	84.80	−0.42	84.38	0.24	84.62	81.59	87.60	6.01	1.04
Fukui	84.92	81.85	87.88	6.03	84.07	0.94	85.01	−0.18	84.83	0.09	84.92	0.29	85.21	−0.69	84.52	0.33	84.85	81.98	87.67	5.69	0.78
Fukuoka	84.90	81.55	87.91	6.36	83.54	0.92	84.46	0.06	84.52	0.38	84.90	−0.24	84.66	−0.51	84.15	−0.03	84.12	80.80	87.23	6.43	0.58
Saga	84.89	81.42	88.11	6.69	83.50	0.77	84.27	0.31	84.58	0.31	84.89	−0.14	84.75	−0.43	84.32	−0.12	84.20	80.91	87.35	6.44	0.70
Miyagi	84.86	81.90	87.70	5.80	83.80	0.54	84.34	0.07	84.41	0.45	84.86	−0.12	84.74	−0.54	84.20	−0.10	84.10	81.08	87.13	6.05	0.30
Niigata	84.72	81.55	87.81	6.26	83.55	0.66	84.21	0.05	84.26	0.46	84.72	−0.29	84.43	−0.22	84.21	−0.16	84.05	80.87	87.29	6.42	0.50
Aichi	84.69	81.75	87.61	5.86	83.44	0.92	84.36	0.18	84.54	0.15	84.69	−0.04	84.65	−0.49	84.16	0.16	84.32	81.46	87.24	5.78	0.88
Mie	84.67	81.70	87.54	5.84	83.34	1.00	84.34	0.26	84.60	0.07	84.67	0.07	84.74	−0.34	84.40	−0.22	84.18	81.33	87.03	5.70	0.84
Yamaguchi	84.63	81.19	87.85	6.66	83.16	1.08	84.24	−0.06	84.18	0.45	84.63	−0.22	84.41	−0.17	84.24	−0.28	83.96	80.70	87.13	6.43	0.80
Kōchi	84.61	81.16	87.84	6.68	83.15	1.00	84.15	−0.03	84.12	0.49	84.61	−0.13	84.48	−0.69	83.79	0.36	84.15	80.66	87.56	6.90	1.00
Kagawa	84.60	81.48	87.62	6.14	83.44	0.93	84.37	0.24	84.61	−0.01	84.60	0.20	84.80	−0.45	84.35	−0.17	84.18	81.28	87.04	5.76	0.74
Ehime	84.56	81.48	87.38	5.90	83.13	1.00	84.13	0.03	84.16	0.40	84.56	−0.26	84.30	−0.20	84.10	−0.05	84.05	80.68	87.34	6.66	0.92
Shizuoka	84.55	81.59	87.47	5.88	83.55	0.79	84.34	0.05	84.39	0.16	84.55	0.12	84.67	−0.50	84.17	0.02	84.19	81.36	87.05	5.69	0.64
Chiba	84.55	81.53	87.62	6.09	83.48	0.85	84.33	−0.08	84.25	0.30	84.55	−0.09	84.46	−0.61	83.85	0.09	83.94	81.04	86.95	5.91	0.46
Okinawa	84.52	80.92	88.17	7.25	83.65	0.67	84.32	−0.06	84.26	0.26	84.52	−0.53	83.99	−0.73	83.26	0.13	83.39	79.94	87.07	7.13	−0.26
Wakayama	84.49	81.23	87.52	6.29	82.86	0.92	83.78	0.37	84.15	0.34	84.49	−0.21	84.28	−0.54	83.74	−0.29	83.45	80.30	86.49	6.19	0.59
Yamagata	84.42	81.53	87.18	5.65	83.20	1.12	84.32	0.04	84.36	0.06	84.42	0.14	84.56	−0.56	84.00	0.21	84.21	81.25	87.17	5.92	1.01
Tokushima	84.42	81.32	87.33	6.01	82.57	1.60	84.17	0.18	84.35	0.07	84.42	0.07	84.49	−0.33	84.16	−0.14	84.02	80.97	87.00	6.03	1.45
Saitama	84.39	81.49	87.32	5.83	83.22	0.91	84.13	0.12	84.25	0.14	84.39	−0.10	84.29	−0.50	83.79	0.01	83.80	80.87	86.86	5.99	0.58
Miyazaki	84.39	81.09	87.48	6.39	83.51	0.76	84.27	0.36	84.63	−0.24	84.39	0.03	84.42	−0.68	83.74	−0.18	83.56	80.22	86.84	6.62	0.05
Kagoshima	84.38	80.97	87.60	6.63	83.14	0.82	83.96	0.18	84.14	0.24	84.38	0.12	84.50	−0.69	83.81	0.04	83.85	80.63	87.01	6.38	0.71
Nagasaki	84.33	80.93	87.46	6.53	83.15	0.97	84.12	0.25	84.37	−0.04	84.33	0.01	84.34	0.06	84.40	−0.58	83.82	80.48	87.01	6.53	0.67
Hokkaido	84.32	81.09	87.28	6.19	83.19	0.79	83.98	0.09	84.07	0.25	84.32	−0.34	83.98	−0.41	83.57	0.05	83.62	80.57	86.47	5.90	0.43
Gunma	84.30	81.36	87.27	5.91	83.05	0.91	83.96	0.13	84.09	0.21	84.30	−0.34	83.96	−0.35	83.61	−0.06	83.55	80.68	86.54	5.86	0.50
Osaka	84.23	80.89	87.47	6.58	82.92	0.92	83.84	0.26	84.10	0.13	84.23	−0.21	84.02	−0.49	83.53	0.21	83.74	80.40	87.04	6.64	0.82
Tochigi	84.15	81.22	87.08	5.86	82.81	0.76	83.57	0.11	83.68	0.47	84.15	−0.19	83.96	−0.58	83.38	0.07	83.45	80.65	86.38	5.73	0.64
Iwate	84.12	80.89	87.18	6.29	83.01	0.40	83.41	0.09	83.50	0.62	84.12	0.04	84.16	−0.98	83.18	0.01	83.19	79.68	86.77	7.09	0.18
Akita	84.03	80.46	87.41	6.95	82.62	0.92	83.54	0.21	83.75	0.28	84.03	−0.05	83.98	−0.55	83.43	−0.20	83.23	79.92	86.45	6.53	0.61
Fukushima	83.96	80.87	87.05	6.18	82.83	0.64	83.47	0.11	83.58	0.38	83.96	−0.37	83.59	−0.36	83.23	0.05	83.28	80.44	86.22	5.78	0.45
Ibaraki	83.93	80.89	87.07	6.18	82.79	0.74	83.53	0.13	83.66	0.27	83.93	0.07	84.00	−0.63	83.37	−0.03	83.34	80.45	86.40	5.95	0.55
Aomori	83.09	79.43	86.58	7.15	81.91	0.90	82.81	−0.21	82.60	0.49	83.09	−0.13	82.96	−0.27	82.69	−0.47	82.22	78.78	85.55	6.77	0.31

Data source: National Institute of Population and Social Security Research

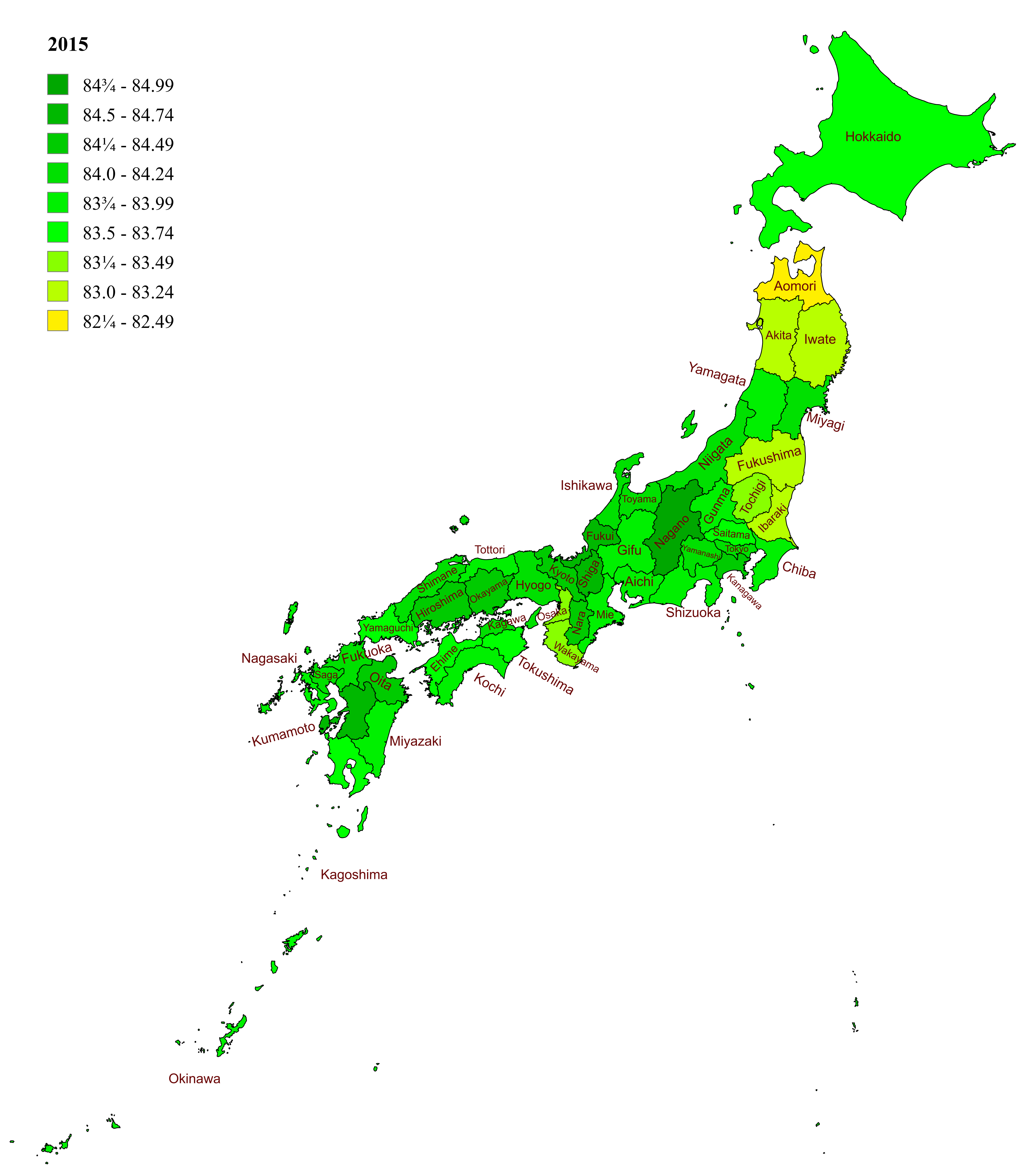
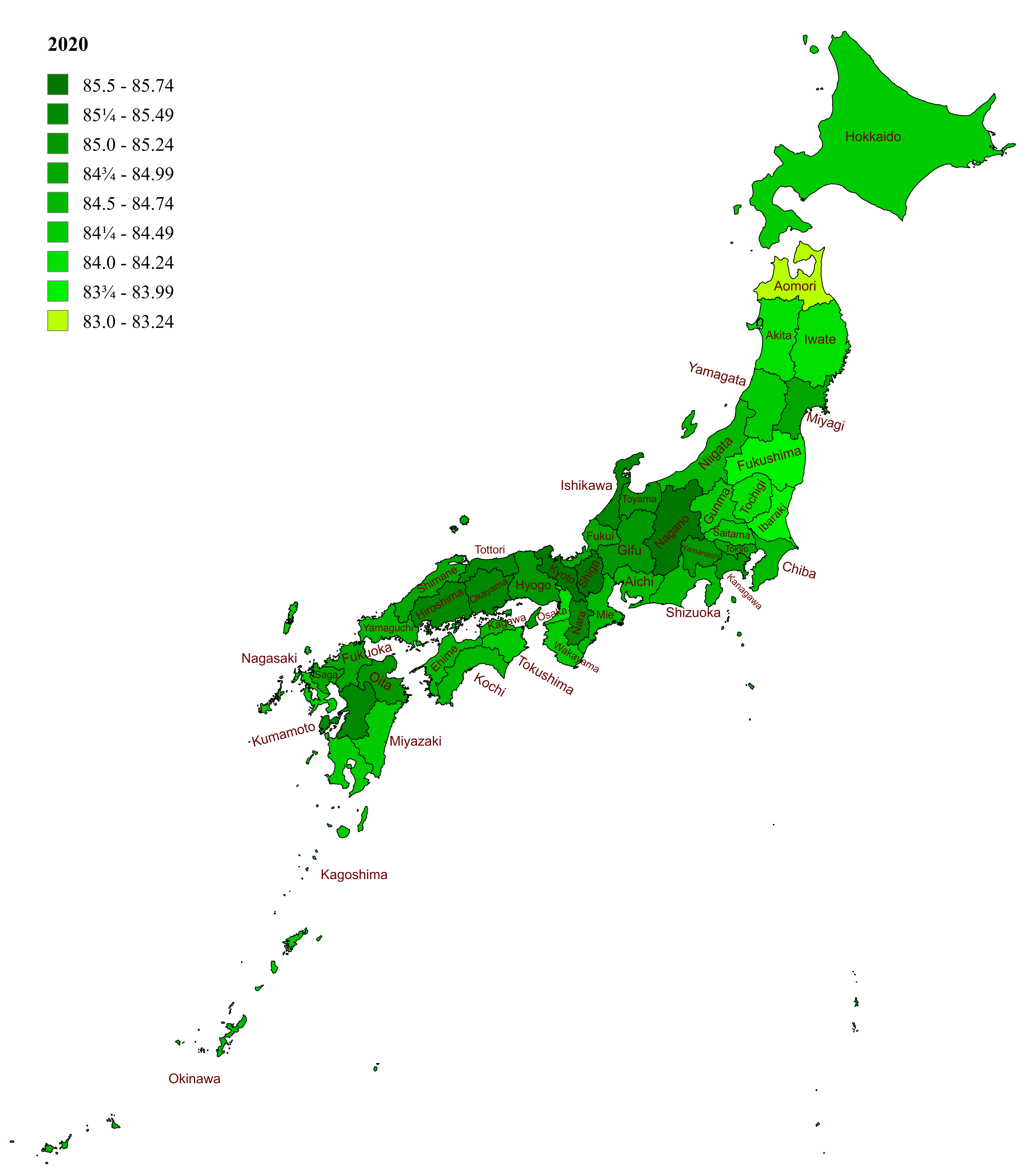
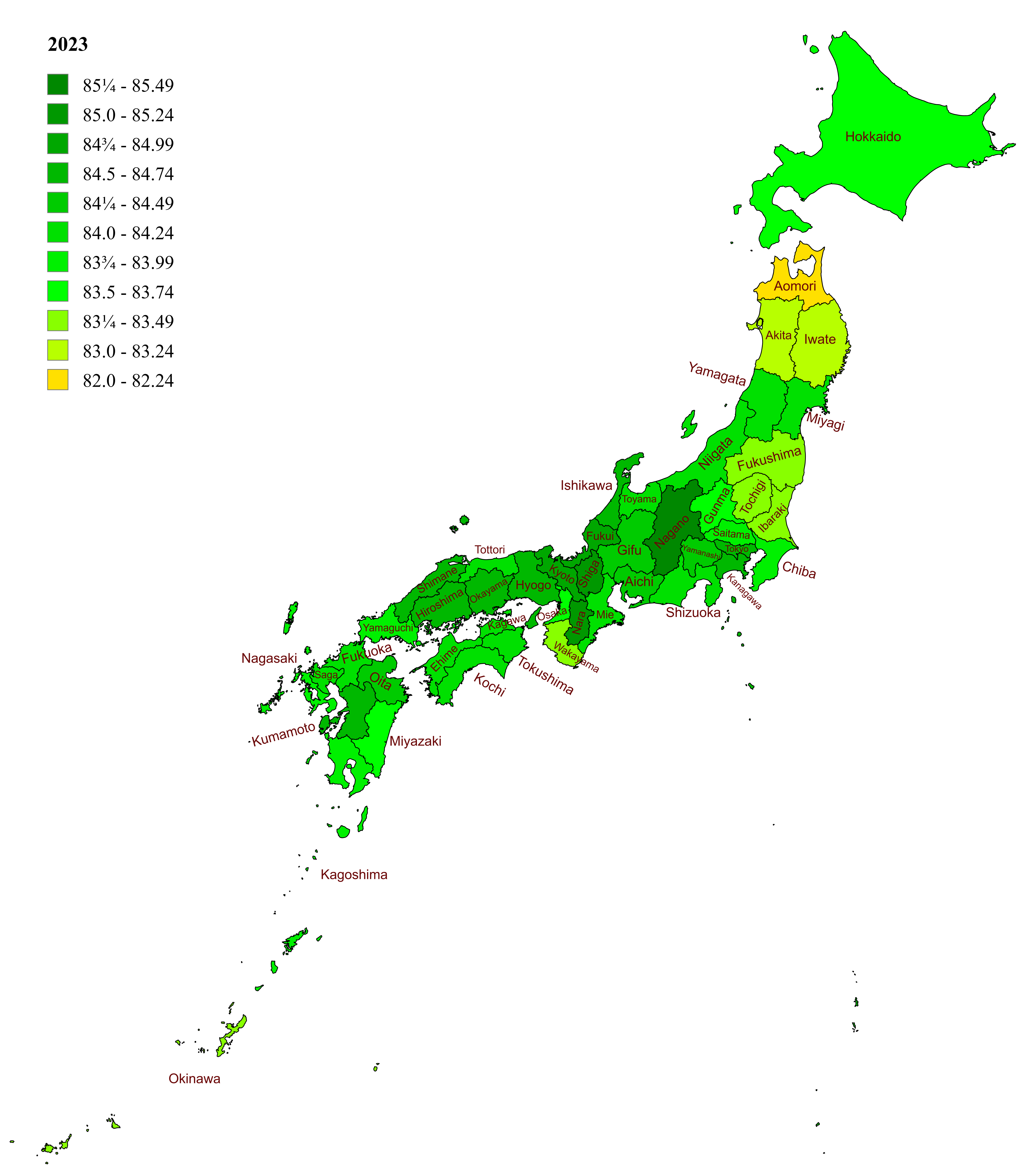
Maps of life expectancy in prefectures of Japan in 2015, 2020, 2023
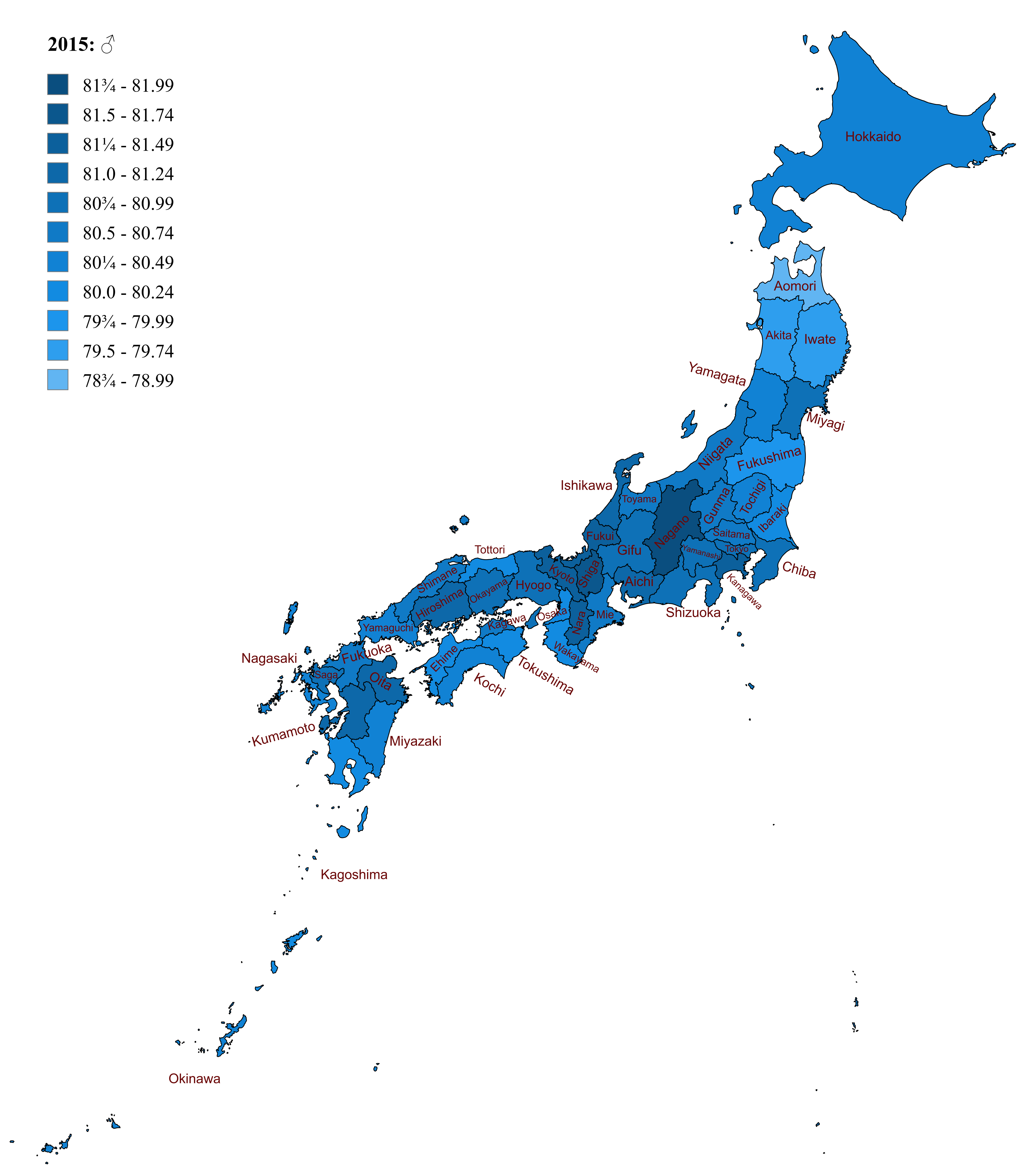
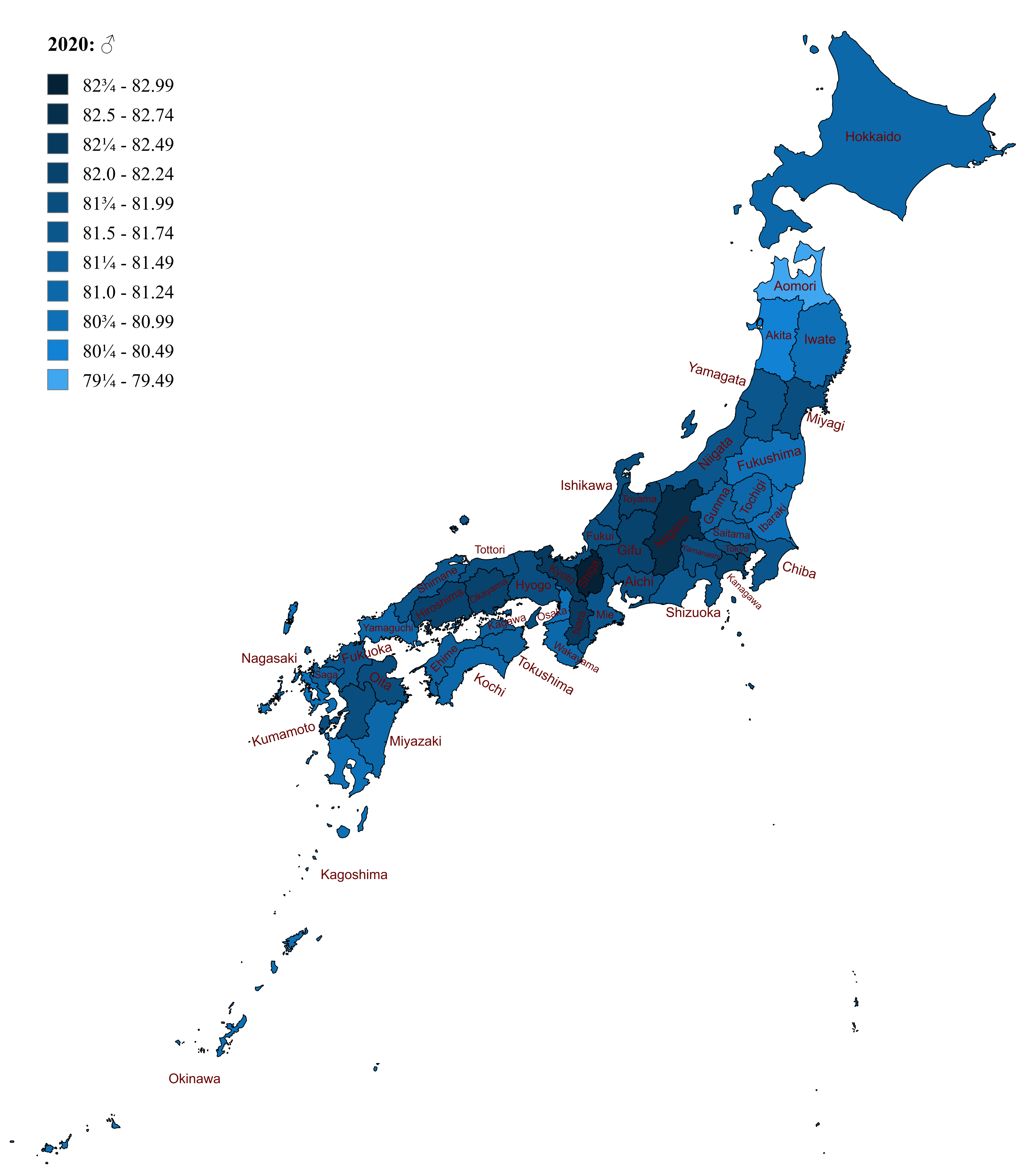
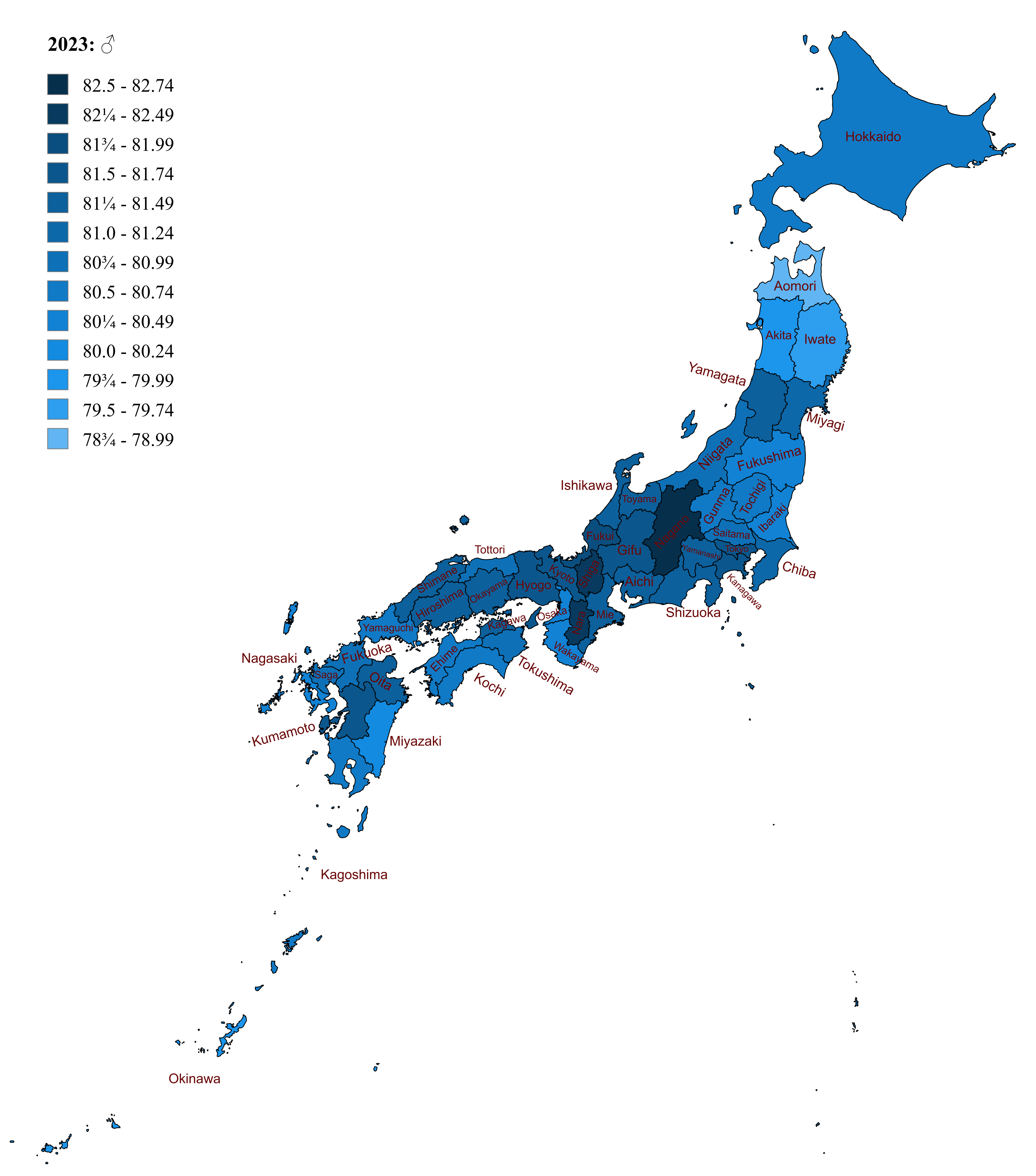
Maps of life expectancy for male
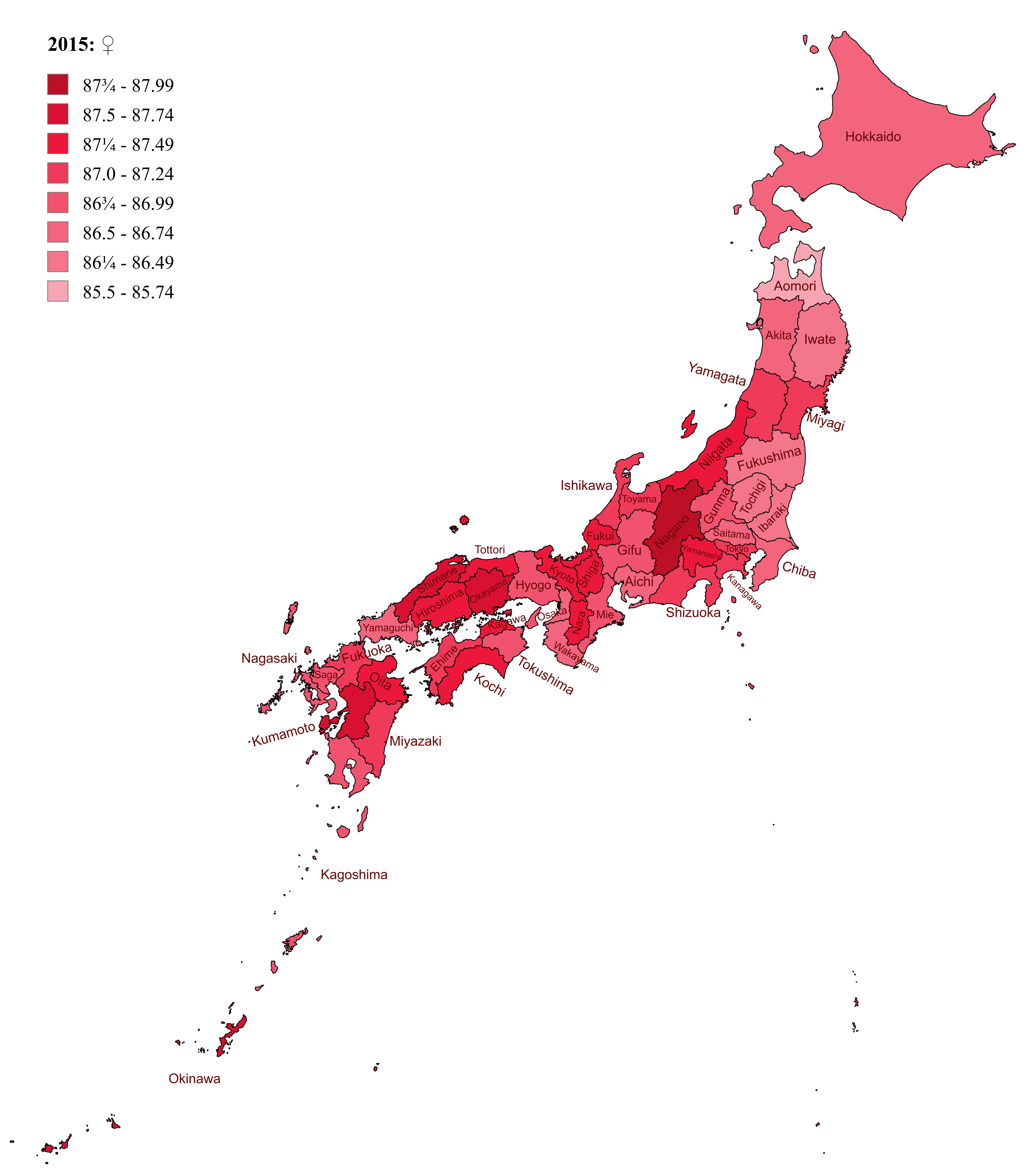
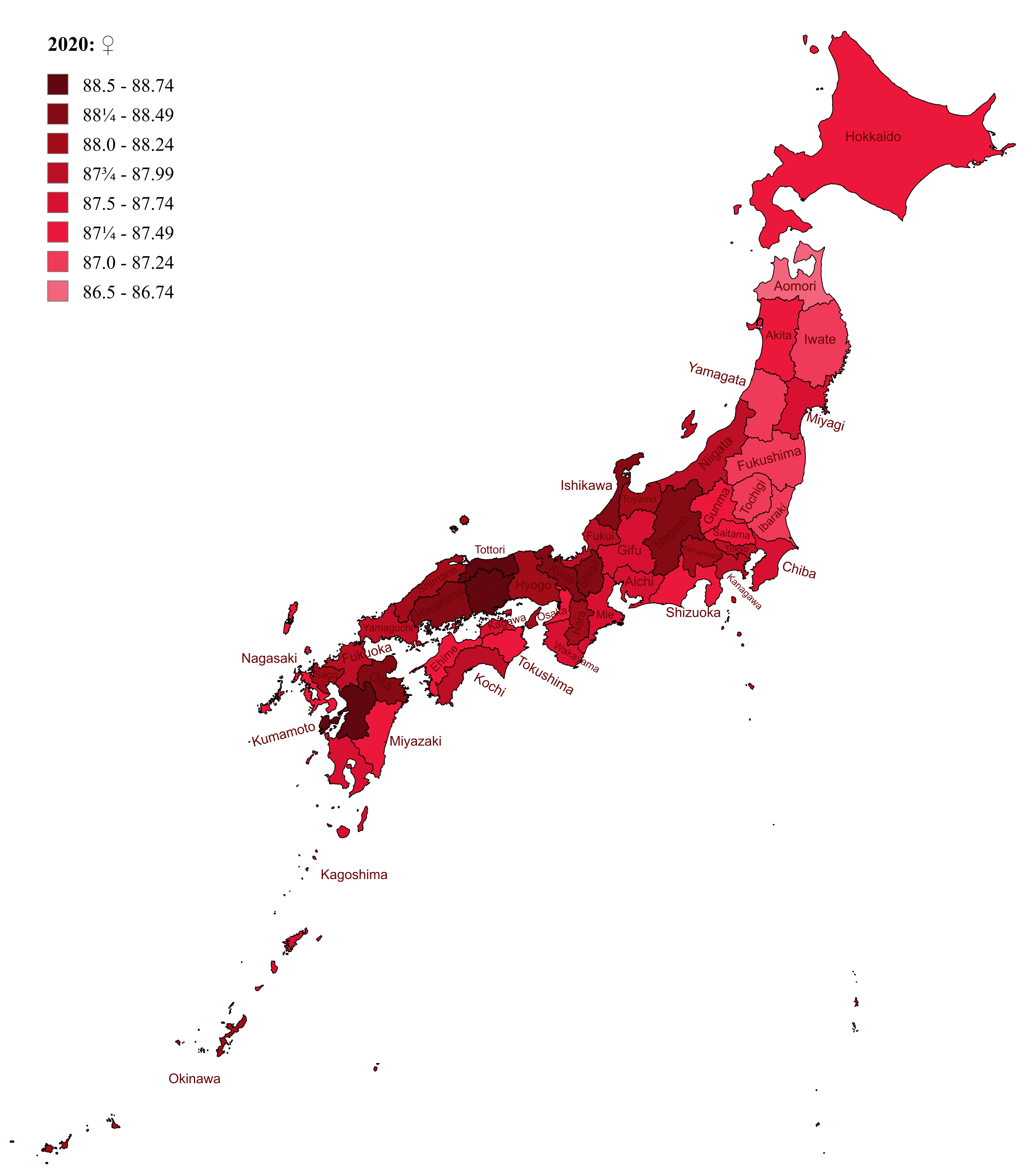
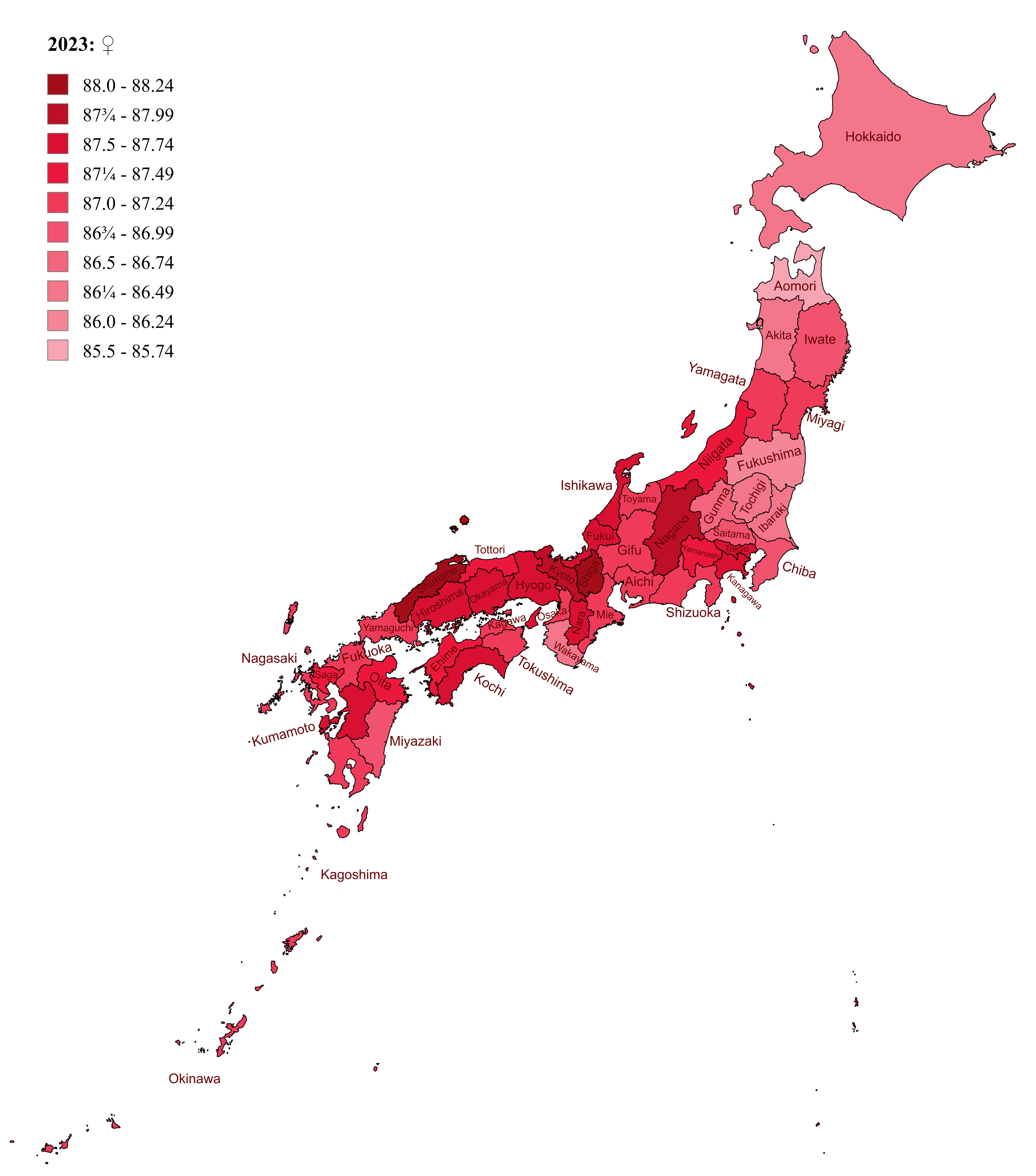
Maps of life expectancy for female

== The Japanese Mortality Database (2023) ==
Detailed data for 2023.

prefecture	Life expectancy for population in general									Life expectancy for male					Life expectancy for female					Female Δ Male				
prefecture	at birth	bonus 0→65	at 65	bonus 65→80	at 80	bonus 80→100	at 100	bonus 100→110	at 110	at birth	at 65	at 80	at 100	at 110	at birth	at 65	at 80	at 100	at 110	at birth	at 65	at 80	at 100	at 110
Japan	84.14	2.92	22.06	3.59	10.65	11.71	2.36	8.97	1.33	81.10	19.54	9.01	2.08	1.30	87.16	24.40	11.85	2.40	1.33	6.06	4.86	2.84	0.32	0.03
Nagano	85.28	2.62	22.90	3.13	11.03	11.22	2.25	9.02	1.27	82.58	20.59	9.44	2.02	1.26	87.96	25.07	12.26	2.30	1.27	5.38	4.48	2.82	0.28	0.01
Shiga	85.19	2.54	22.73	3.05	10.78	11.51	2.29	8.99	1.28	82.31	20.40	9.25	2.14	1.32	88.06	24.93	11.98	2.31	1.28	5.75	4.53	2.73	0.17	−0.04
Nara	85.09	2.54	22.63	3.11	10.74	11.55	2.29	9.01	1.30	82.38	20.40	9.25	1.92	1.22	87.61	24.61	11.87	2.35	1.30	5.23	4.21	2.62	0.43	0.08
Kyoto	84.89	2.81	22.70	3.34	11.04	11.46	2.50	8.88	1.38	81.71	20.14	9.34	2.13	1.31	87.92	24.96	12.25	2.57	1.39	6.21	4.82	2.91	0.44	0.08
Fukui	84.85	2.48	22.33	3.21	10.54	11.69	2.23	9.05	1.28	81.98	19.91	8.91	1.93	1.24	87.67	24.55	11.72	2.28	1.28	5.69	4.64	2.81	0.35	0.04
Shimane	84.73	2.79	22.52	3.51	11.03	11.33	2.36	8.96	1.32	81.32	19.72	9.16	1.93	1.22	88.14	25.11	12.31	2.44	1.33	6.82	5.39	3.15	0.51	0.11
Kumamoto	84.71	2.79	22.50	3.44	10.94	11.36	2.30	9.00	1.30	81.55	19.97	9.30	2.02	1.26	87.71	24.75	12.06	2.35	1.30	6.16	4.78	2.76	0.33	0.04
Hyōgo	84.71	2.70	22.41	3.45	10.86	11.57	2.43	8.92	1.35	81.68	19.88	9.19	2.15	1.33	87.59	24.70	12.07	2.47	1.35	5.91	4.82	2.88	0.32	0.02
Tokyo	84.62	2.76	22.38	3.64	11.02	11.53	2.55	8.85	1.40	81.59	19.75	9.26	2.24	1.37	87.60	24.79	12.25	2.60	1.40	6.01	5.04	2.99	0.36	0.03
Okayama	84.59	2.77	22.36	3.40	10.76	11.55	2.31	8.99	1.30	81.45	19.84	9.10	2.02	1.27	87.67	24.69	11.99	2.35	1.30	6.22	4.85	2.89	0.33	0.03
Hiroshima	84.54	2.79	22.33	3.46	10.79	11.51	2.30	9.00	1.30	81.45	19.79	9.15	2.05	1.28	87.58	24.67	11.98	2.34	1.30	6.13	4.88	2.83	0.29	0.02
Kanagawa	84.53	2.83	22.36	3.53	10.89	11.58	2.47	8.90	1.37	81.58	19.87	9.26	2.18	1.34	87.52	24.71	12.13	2.52	1.37	5.94	4.84	2.87	0.34	0.03
Ishikawa	84.50	2.67	22.17	3.38	10.55	11.79	2.34	8.99	1.33	81.40	19.52	8.77	1.97	1.26	87.50	24.58	11.82	2.42	1.34	6.10	5.06	3.05	0.45	0.08
Ōita	84.46	2.84	22.30	3.41	10.71	11.56	2.27	9.02	1.29	81.37	19.78	8.98	2.01	1.27	87.37	24.52	11.91	2.31	1.29	6.00	4.74	2.93	0.30	0.02
Gifu	84.36	2.79	22.15	3.29	10.44	11.80	2.24	9.05	1.29	81.59	19.80	8.86	1.89	1.22	87.08	24.34	11.65	2.30	1.29	5.49	4.54	2.79	0.41	0.07
Yamanashi	84.35	2.92	22.27	3.32	10.59	11.72	2.31	9.00	1.31	81.31	19.81	8.86	1.93	1.24	87.46	24.62	11.92	2.39	1.32	6.15	4.81	3.06	0.46	0.08
Aichi	84.32	2.71	22.03	3.50	10.53	11.84	2.37	8.97	1.34	81.46	19.61	8.96	2.09	1.31	87.24	24.35	11.75	2.41	1.34	5.78	4.74	2.79	0.32	0.03
Toyama	84.24	2.84	22.08	3.45	10.53	11.75	2.28	9.02	1.30	81.29	19.53	8.89	1.96	1.25	87.11	24.39	11.67	2.33	1.30	5.82	4.86	2.78	0.37	0.05
Tottori	84.21	2.92	22.13	3.55	10.68	11.72	2.40	8.95	1.35	80.97	19.32	8.77	2.00	1.27	87.37	24.71	12.01	2.46	1.35	6.40	5.39	3.24	0.46	0.08
Yamagata	84.21	2.89	22.10	3.37	10.47	11.73	2.20	9.06	1.26	81.25	19.76	8.97	2.07	1.30	87.17	24.27	11.54	2.22	1.26	5.92	4.51	2.57	0.15	−0.04
Saga	84.20	2.86	22.06	3.58	10.64	11.72	2.36	8.97	1.33	80.91	19.40	8.91	2.12	1.32	87.35	24.43	11.81	2.39	1.33	6.44	5.03	2.90	0.27	0.01
Shizuoka	84.19	2.84	22.03	3.47	10.50	11.82	2.32	9.00	1.32	81.36	19.68	8.97	1.99	1.26	87.05	24.25	11.66	2.37	1.32	5.69	4.57	2.69	0.38	0.06
Kagawa	84.18	2.85	22.03	3.54	10.57	11.83	2.40	8.95	1.35	81.28	19.64	9.07	2.12	1.32	87.04	24.25	11.68	2.44	1.35	5.76	4.61	2.61	0.32	0.03
Mie	84.18	2.72	21.90	3.44	10.34	11.89	2.23	9.06	1.29	81.33	19.59	8.87	1.94	1.24	87.03	24.06	11.45	2.27	1.29	5.70	4.47	2.58	0.33	0.05
Kōchi	84.15	2.87	22.02	3.77	10.79	11.46	2.25	9.02	1.27	80.66	19.29	9.05	2.11	1.31	87.56	24.51	12.00	2.27	1.26	6.90	5.22	2.95	0.16	−0.05
Fukuoka	84.12	2.98	22.10	3.66	10.76	11.66	2.42	8.93	1.35	80.80	19.39	8.98	2.09	1.31	87.23	24.46	11.94	2.46	1.35	6.43	5.07	2.96	0.37	0.04
Miyagi	84.10	2.91	22.01	3.57	10.58	11.77	2.35	8.98	1.33	81.08	19.55	8.99	2.02	1.27	87.13	24.31	11.71	2.41	1.34	6.05	4.76	2.72	0.39	0.07
Niigata	84.05	2.94	21.99	3.54	10.53	11.77	2.30	9.00	1.30	80.87	19.45	8.87	2.00	1.27	87.29	24.40	11.75	2.34	1.30	6.42	4.95	2.88	0.34	0.03
Ehime	84.05	2.92	21.97	3.66	10.63	11.65	2.28	9.01	1.29	80.68	19.28	8.87	2.10	1.32	87.34	24.41	11.87	2.31	1.29	6.66	5.13	3.00	0.21	−0.03
Tokushima	84.02	2.91	21.93	3.58	10.51	11.73	2.24	9.04	1.28	80.97	19.49	8.87	1.99	1.26	87.00	24.17	11.68	2.28	1.28	6.03	4.68	2.81	0.29	0.02
Yamaguchi	83.96	2.86	21.82	3.69	10.51	11.77	2.28	9.01	1.29	80.70	19.14	8.78	2.05	1.29	87.13	24.25	11.73	2.31	1.29	6.43	5.11	2.95	0.26	0.00
Chiba	83.94	3.05	21.99	3.53	10.52	11.79	2.31	9.00	1.31	81.04	19.63	9.05	2.09	1.30	86.95	24.27	11.69	2.35	1.31	5.91	4.64	2.64	0.26	0.01
Kagoshima	83.85	3.17	22.02	3.67	10.69	11.62	2.31	9.00	1.31	80.63	19.46	9.07	2.06	1.29	87.01	24.40	11.82	2.35	1.31	6.38	4.94	2.75	0.29	0.02
Nagasaki	83.82	3.14	21.96	3.65	10.61	11.64	2.25	9.02	1.27	80.48	19.28	8.83	2.08	1.31	87.01	24.36	11.83	2.27	1.27	6.53	5.08	3.00	0.19	−0.04
Saitama	83.80	2.97	21.77	3.65	10.42	11.93	2.35	8.99	1.34	80.87	19.38	8.94	2.10	1.31	86.86	24.11	11.59	2.39	1.34	5.99	4.73	2.65	0.29	0.03
Osaka	83.74	3.06	21.80	3.84	10.64	11.83	2.47	8.91	1.38	80.40	19.06	8.94	2.17	1.35	87.04	24.33	11.87	2.52	1.38	6.64	5.27	2.93	0.35	0.03
Hokkaido	83.62	3.20	21.82	3.86	10.68	11.78	2.46	8.91	1.37	80.57	19.24	8.94	2.18	1.35	86.47	24.08	11.92	2.51	1.37	5.90	4.84	2.98	0.33	0.02
Miyazaki	83.56	3.31	21.87	3.75	10.62	11.69	2.31	8.99	1.30	80.22	19.17	8.95	2.14	1.33	86.84	24.37	11.81	2.33	1.30	6.62	5.20	2.86	0.19	−0.03
Gunma	83.55	3.01	21.56	3.67	10.23	11.98	2.21	9.07	1.28	80.68	19.15	8.65	1.95	1.25	86.54	23.91	11.47	2.25	1.28	5.86	4.76	2.82	0.30	0.03
Wakayama	83.45	3.20	21.65	3.61	10.26	12.04	2.30	9.02	1.32	80.30	19.04	8.61	1.91	1.24	86.49	24.04	11.45	2.35	1.32	6.19	5.00	2.84	0.44	0.08
Tochigi	83.45	3.16	21.61	3.64	10.25	11.98	2.23	9.06	1.29	80.65	19.24	8.66	1.88	1.22	86.38	23.92	11.48	2.29	1.29	5.73	4.68	2.82	0.41	0.07
Okinawa	83.39	3.62	22.01	3.99	11.00	11.44	2.44	8.91	1.35	79.94	19.33	9.38	2.22	1.36	87.07	24.67	12.21	2.48	1.35	7.13	5.34	2.83	0.26	−0.01
Ibaraki	83.34	3.31	21.65	3.70	10.35	11.92	2.27	9.03	1.30	80.45	19.27	8.87	2.08	1.31	86.40	24.00	11.52	2.31	1.30	5.95	4.73	2.65	0.23	−0.01
Fukushima	83.28	3.32	21.60	3.70	10.30	11.94	2.24	9.05	1.29	80.44	19.16	8.65	1.92	1.24	86.22	23.92	11.49	2.29	1.30	5.78	4.76	2.84	0.37	0.06
Akita	83.23	3.34	21.57	3.75	10.32	11.83	2.15	9.10	1.25	79.92	18.90	8.59	1.90	1.23	86.45	23.94	11.46	2.19	1.25	6.53	5.04	2.87	0.29	0.02
Iwate	83.19	3.38	21.57	3.84	10.41	11.78	2.19	9.07	1.26	79.68	18.85	8.66	2.06	1.31	86.77	24.10	11.62	2.21	1.26	7.09	5.25	2.96	0.15	−0.05
Aomori	82.22	3.60	20.82	4.15	9.97	12.14	2.11	9.13	1.24	78.78	17.97	8.17	1.95	1.27	85.55	23.37	11.15	2.13	1.24	6.77	5.40	2.98	0.18	−0.03

Data source: National Institute of Population and Social Security Research

== The Japanese Mortality Database (2020) ==
prefecture	Life expectancy for population in general									Life expectancy for male					Life expectancy for female					Female Δ Male				
prefecture	at birth	bonus 0→65	at 65	bonus 65→80	at 80	bonus 80→100	at 100	bonus 100→110	at 110	at birth	at 65	at 80	at 100	at 110	at birth	at 65	at 80	at 100	at 110	at birth	at 65	at 80	at 100	at 110
Japan	84.71	2.87	22.58	3.50	11.08	11.44	2.52	8.87	1.39	81.58	19.99	9.36	2.19	1.34	87.73	24.90	12.28	2.58	1.39	6.15	4.91	2.92	0.39	0.05
Shiga	85.71	2.44	23.15	3.13	11.28	11.14	2.42	8.91	1.33	82.88	20.73	9.64	2.10	1.29	88.39	25.32	12.41	2.48	1.34	5.51	4.59	2.77	0.38	0.05
Kyoto	85.54	2.59	23.13	3.28	11.41	11.21	2.62	8.80	1.42	82.34	20.51	9.63	2.23	1.35	88.49	25.37	12.62	2.69	1.42	6.15	4.86	2.99	0.46	0.07
Nagano	85.51	2.80	23.31	3.13	11.44	11.03	2.47	8.88	1.35	82.54	20.89	9.78	2.09	1.27	88.39	25.48	12.62	2.55	1.36	5.85	4.59	2.84	0.46	0.09
Nara	85.45	2.67	23.12	3.16	11.28	11.14	2.42	8.91	1.33	82.45	20.65	9.53	2.05	1.26	88.18	25.26	12.48	2.49	1.34	5.73	4.61	2.95	0.44	0.08
Okayama	85.39	2.63	23.02	3.32	11.34	11.22	2.56	8.83	1.39	82.08	20.30	9.50	2.12	1.30	88.53	25.41	12.56	2.63	1.40	6.45	5.11	3.06	0.51	0.10
Kumamoto	85.37	2.87	23.24	3.22	11.46	11.04	2.50	8.86	1.36	81.96	20.57	9.62	2.13	1.30	88.51	25.50	12.66	2.57	1.36	6.55	4.93	3.04	0.44	0.06
Hiroshima	85.37	2.71	23.08	3.36	11.44	11.10	2.54	8.84	1.38	82.17	20.44	9.62	2.20	1.33	88.39	25.36	12.65	2.60	1.38	6.22	4.92	3.03	0.40	0.05
Tottori	85.31	2.65	22.96	3.56	11.52	11.11	2.63	8.78	1.41	81.76	20.01	9.58	2.26	1.36	88.68	25.56	12.74	2.68	1.41	6.92	5.55	3.16	0.42	0.05
Ishikawa	85.25	2.59	22.84	3.31	11.15	11.33	2.48	8.88	1.36	81.97	20.12	9.24	2.24	1.37	88.34	25.20	12.43	2.53	1.36	6.37	5.08	3.19	0.29	−0.01
Ōita	85.22	2.75	22.97	3.32	11.29	11.17	2.46	8.89	1.35	81.84	20.23	9.47	2.10	1.29	88.37	25.31	12.48	2.52	1.35	6.53	5.08	3.01	0.42	0.06
Toyama	85.22	2.57	22.79	3.37	11.16	11.35	2.51	8.86	1.37	82.08	20.16	9.32	2.17	1.33	88.15	25.06	12.39	2.56	1.38	6.07	4.90	3.07	0.39	0.05
Kanagawa	85.04	2.79	22.83	3.44	11.27	11.32	2.59	8.82	1.41	82.06	20.33	9.60	2.26	1.37	87.99	25.10	12.47	2.64	1.41	5.93	4.77	2.87	0.38	0.04
Gifu	85.03	2.63	22.66	3.19	10.85	11.59	2.44	8.92	1.36	82.24	20.32	9.21	2.15	1.33	87.68	24.75	12.03	2.49	1.36	5.44	4.43	2.82	0.34	0.03
Hyōgo	85.02	2.76	22.78	3.35	11.13	11.37	2.50	8.87	1.37	81.78	20.13	9.34	2.17	1.33	88.05	25.09	12.37	2.55	1.37	6.27	4.96	3.03	0.38	0.04
Yamanashi	85.01	2.85	22.86	3.33	11.19	11.37	2.56	8.84	1.40	81.76	20.33	9.44	2.29	1.39	88.24	25.18	12.44	2.61	1.40	6.48	4.85	3.00	0.32	0.01
Shimane	84.98	2.94	22.92	3.43	11.35	11.11	2.46	8.88	1.34	81.71	20.23	9.55	2.23	1.35	88.12	25.29	12.50	2.50	1.34	6.41	5.06	2.95	0.27	−0.01
Tokyo	84.97	2.72	22.69	3.61	11.30	11.28	2.58	8.82	1.40	81.86	20.01	9.52	2.29	1.38	87.96	25.06	12.49	2.62	1.40	6.10	5.05	2.97	0.33	0.02
Fukui	84.92	2.93	22.85	3.25	11.10	11.30	2.40	8.93	1.33	81.85	20.24	9.34	2.04	1.27	87.88	25.18	12.30	2.47	1.34	6.03	4.94	2.96	0.43	0.07
Fukuoka	84.90	2.84	22.74	3.53	11.27	11.33	2.60	8.81	1.41	81.55	19.91	9.35	2.21	1.35	87.91	25.10	12.47	2.64	1.41	6.36	5.19	3.12	0.43	0.06
Saga	84.89	2.79	22.68	3.39	11.07	11.43	2.50	8.87	1.37	81.42	19.96	9.24	2.21	1.36	88.11	25.00	12.26	2.54	1.37	6.69	5.04	3.02	0.33	0.01
Miyagi	84.86	2.86	22.72	3.35	11.07	11.39	2.46	8.90	1.36	81.90	20.25	9.43	2.21	1.35	87.70	24.90	12.18	2.51	1.36	5.80	4.65	2.75	0.30	0.01
Niigata	84.72	2.84	22.56	3.46	11.02	11.48	2.50	8.88	1.38	81.55	19.89	9.19	2.13	1.32	87.81	24.95	12.23	2.56	1.38	6.26	5.06	3.04	0.43	0.06
Aichi	84.69	2.69	22.38	3.46	10.84	11.62	2.46	8.91	1.37	81.75	19.91	9.18	2.13	1.32	87.61	24.68	12.05	2.51	1.37	5.86	4.77	2.87	0.38	0.05
Mie	84.67	2.83	22.50	3.36	10.86	11.54	2.40	8.95	1.35	81.70	20.14	9.29	2.06	1.28	87.54	24.61	11.97	2.46	1.35	5.84	4.47	2.68	0.40	0.07
Yamaguchi	84.63	2.92	22.55	3.57	11.12	11.43	2.55	8.85	1.40	81.19	19.73	9.30	2.19	1.34	87.85	24.99	12.29	2.61	1.40	6.66	5.26	2.99	0.42	0.06
Kōchi	84.61	3.21	22.82	3.55	11.37	11.21	2.58	8.82	1.40	81.16	19.90	9.40	2.20	1.35	87.84	25.37	12.66	2.64	1.40	6.68	5.47	3.26	0.44	0.05
Kagawa	84.60	3.01	22.61	3.50	11.11	11.35	2.46	8.89	1.35	81.48	19.94	9.37	2.15	1.32	87.62	25.05	12.33	2.51	1.35	6.14	5.11	2.96	0.36	0.03
Ehime	84.56	2.93	22.49	3.61	11.10	11.48	2.58	8.84	1.42	81.48	19.95	9.37	2.20	1.35	87.38	24.64	12.23	2.64	1.42	5.90	4.69	2.86	0.44	0.07
Chiba	84.55	2.94	22.49	3.49	10.98	11.51	2.49	8.88	1.37	81.53	20.02	9.39	2.19	1.34	87.62	24.81	12.17	2.53	1.37	6.09	4.79	2.78	0.34	0.03
Shizuoka	84.55	2.91	22.46	3.47	10.93	11.58	2.51	8.88	1.39	81.59	19.96	9.28	2.12	1.31	87.47	24.76	12.10	2.57	1.40	5.88	4.80	2.82	0.45	0.09
Okinawa	84.52	3.61	23.13	3.68	11.81	11.17	2.98	8.60	1.58	80.92	20.28	9.88	2.54	1.51	88.17	25.77	13.15	3.06	1.59	7.25	5.49	3.27	0.52	0.08
Wakayama	84.49	2.88	22.37	3.47	10.84	11.55	2.39	8.94	1.33	81.23	19.81	9.07	2.07	1.29	87.52	24.57	12.05	2.44	1.33	6.29	4.76	2.98	0.37	0.04
Yamagata	84.42	3.19	22.61	3.29	10.90	11.47	2.37	8.95	1.32	81.53	20.14	9.19	2.13	1.32	87.18	24.79	12.05	2.41	1.32	5.65	4.65	2.86	0.28	0.00
Tokushima	84.42	3.11	22.53	3.51	11.04	11.40	2.44	8.91	1.35	81.32	20.02	9.33	2.20	1.35	87.33	24.73	12.16	2.48	1.35	6.01	4.71	2.83	0.28	0.00
Miyazaki	84.39	3.20	22.59	3.59	11.18	11.38	2.56	8.84	1.40	81.09	19.89	9.39	2.18	1.33	87.48	24.95	12.36	2.62	1.40	6.39	5.06	2.97	0.44	0.07
Saitama	84.39	2.93	22.32	3.54	10.86	11.60	2.46	8.91	1.37	81.49	19.90	9.31	2.14	1.32	87.32	24.58	12.03	2.51	1.37	5.83	4.68	2.72	0.37	0.05
Kagoshima	84.38	3.27	22.65	3.59	11.24	11.34	2.58	8.83	1.41	80.97	20.05	9.51	2.18	1.33	87.60	24.91	12.32	2.64	1.42	6.63	4.86	2.81	0.46	0.09
Nagasaki	84.33	3.18	22.51	3.53	11.04	11.50	2.54	8.86	1.40	80.93	19.90	9.28	2.16	1.33	87.46	24.70	12.15	2.59	1.40	6.53	4.80	2.87	0.43	0.07
Hokkaido	84.32	3.14	22.46	3.72	11.18	11.45	2.63	8.80	1.43	81.09	19.81	9.40	2.31	1.40	87.28	24.70	12.38	2.68	1.43	6.19	4.89	2.98	0.37	0.03
Gunma	84.30	2.89	22.19	3.54	10.73	11.70	2.43	8.93	1.36	81.36	19.71	9.08	2.17	1.34	87.27	24.53	11.95	2.47	1.36	5.91	4.82	2.87	0.30	0.02
Osaka	84.23	2.96	22.19	3.73	10.92	11.62	2.54	8.86	1.40	80.89	19.42	9.14	2.19	1.35	87.47	24.68	12.15	2.59	1.40	6.58	5.26	3.01	0.40	0.05
Tochigi	84.15	3.07	22.22	3.60	10.82	11.67	2.49	8.91	1.40	81.22	19.83	9.26	2.13	1.31	87.08	24.42	11.86	2.56	1.40	5.86	4.59	2.60	0.43	0.09
Iwate	84.12	3.10	22.22	3.67	10.89	11.53	2.42	8.93	1.35	80.89	19.55	9.15	2.11	1.31	87.18	24.55	11.99	2.47	1.35	6.29	5.00	2.84	0.36	0.04
Akita	84.03	3.20	22.23	3.65	10.88	11.49	2.37	8.95	1.32	80.46	19.24	8.97	2.02	1.27	87.41	24.83	12.08	2.42	1.33	6.95	5.59	3.11	0.40	0.06
Fukushima	83.96	3.14	22.10	3.71	10.81	11.59	2.40	8.95	1.35	80.87	19.57	9.13	2.13	1.32	87.05	24.41	11.92	2.46	1.35	6.18	4.84	2.79	0.33	0.03
Ibaraki	83.93	3.22	22.15	3.60	10.75	11.69	2.44	8.92	1.36	80.89	19.66	9.18	2.19	1.35	87.07	24.54	11.88	2.49	1.37	6.18	4.88	2.70	0.30	0.02
Aomori	83.09	3.48	21.57	3.98	10.55	11.86	2.41	8.95	1.36	79.43	18.66	8.74	2.18	1.37	86.58	24.06	11.64	2.45	1.36	7.15	5.40	2.90	0.27	−0.01

Data source: National Institute of Population and Social Security Research

== Probability of dying, 2020–2024 ==
The probability of dying is a statistical indicator that shows the proportion of people who die at a given age to those who have reached that age. Strictly speaking, this is not a probability, but a frequency of deaths.

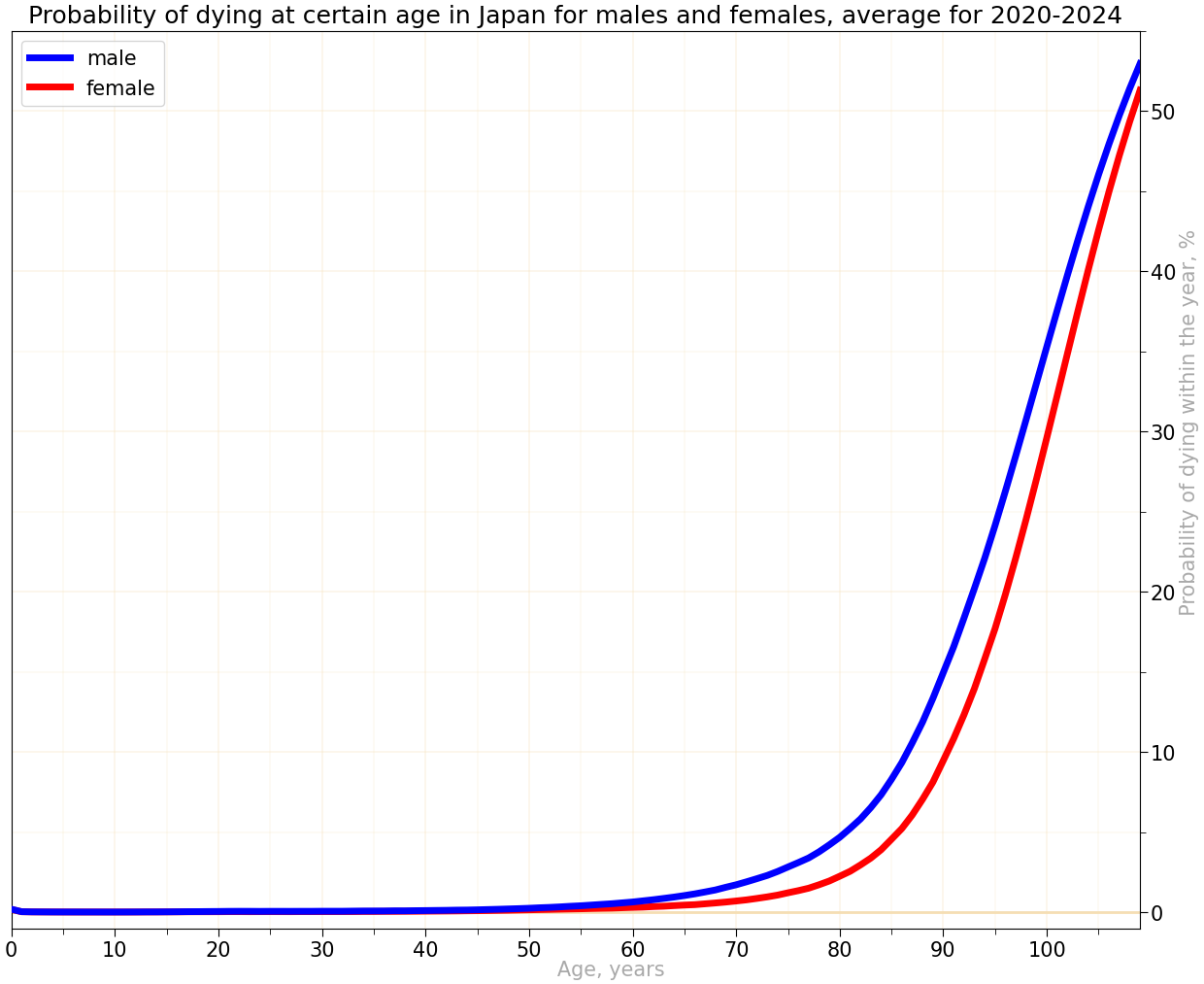
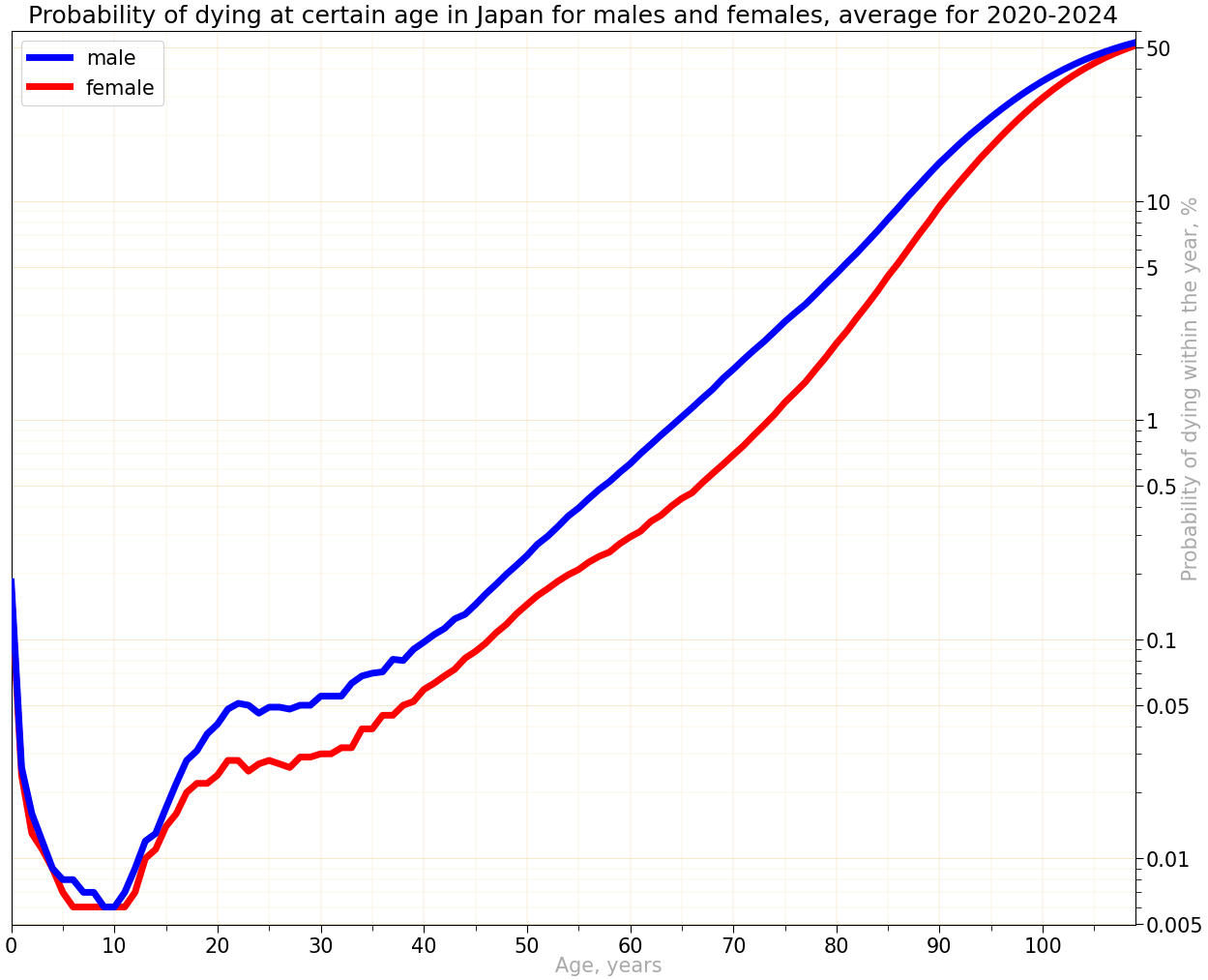
According chart of the probability of dying in Japan for male and female. The chart is made in two versions: using linear and logarithmic scales.
By the age of 109, the probability of dying reaches 53% for male and 51% for female. The probability of dying between ages of 40 and 90 doubles every 7.0 years for male and 7.2 years for female.

Age	Japan on average			Tokyo			Kyoto			Shiga		
Age	Probability of dying, %		M / F	Probability of dying, %		M / F	Probability of dying, %		M / F	Probability of dying, %		M / F
Age	male	female	M / F	male	female	M / F	male	female	M / F	male	female	M / F
0	0.183	0.169	1.08	0.151	0.149	1.01	0.174	0.136	1.28	0.199	0.160	1.24
1	0.026	0.024	1.08	0.024	0.018	1.33	0.035	0.030	1.17	0.015	0.033	0.45
5	0.008	0.007	1.14	0.008	0.008	1.00	0.009	0.009	1.00	0.006	0.006	1.00
10	0.006	0.006	1.00	0.007	0.006	1.17	0.006	0.008	0.75	0.003	0.007	0.43
15	0.017	0.014	1.21	0.018	0.016	1.12	0.018	0.010	1.80	0.023	0.016	1.44
20	0.041	0.024	1.71	0.035	0.027	1.30	0.038	0.025	1.52	0.043	0.027	1.59
25	0.049	0.028	1.75	0.040	0.030	1.33	0.040	0.022	1.82	0.054	0.025	2.16
30	0.055	0.030	1.83	0.040	0.027	1.48	0.044	0.024	1.83	0.042	0.025	1.68
35	0.070	0.039	1.79	0.059	0.035	1.69	0.070	0.026	2.69	0.056	0.031	1.81
40	0.097	0.059	1.64	0.081	0.050	1.62	0.094	0.051	1.84	0.077	0.051	1.51
45	0.144	0.088	1.64	0.121	0.079	1.53	0.131	0.079	1.66	0.114	0.062	1.84
50	0.241	0.144	1.67	0.225	0.133	1.69	0.216	0.122	1.77	0.204	0.119	1.71
55	0.397	0.208	1.91	0.369	0.204	1.81	0.358	0.175	2.05	0.328	0.171	1.92
60	0.632	0.293	2.16	0.620	0.288	2.15	0.586	0.255	2.30	0.509	0.255	2.00
65	1.034	0.439	2.36	1.022	0.439	2.33	0.936	0.407	2.30	0.802	0.374	2.14
70	1.706	0.694	2.46	1.718	0.703	2.44	1.543	0.643	2.40	1.407	0.572	2.46
75	2.815	1.205	2.34	2.825	1.193	2.37	2.541	1.135	2.24	2.291	0.994	2.30
80	4.669	2.239	2.09	4.680	2.181	2.15	4.302	2.051	2.10	4.251	2.009	2.12
85	8.286	4.548	1.82	7.945	4.283	1.86	7.976	4.313	1.85	8.055	4.391	1.83
90	14.943	9.455	1.58	14.001	8.729	1.60	14.246	8.823	1.61	14.528	9.261	1.57
95	24.127	17.693	1.36	23.091	16.877	1.37	23.472	16.779	1.40	24.065	17.973	1.34
100	35.287	29.604	1.19	33.596	28.349	1.19	34.713	28.388	1.22	35.590	30.521	1.17
105	46.024	42.565	1.08	44.226	41.269	1.07	45.649	41.367	1.10	46.596	43.925	1.06
109	52.935	51.277	1.03	51.325	50.184	1.02	52.706	50.304	1.05	53.551	52.599	1.02

Data source: National Institute of Population and Social Security Research

== Percentage surviving in 2020 ==
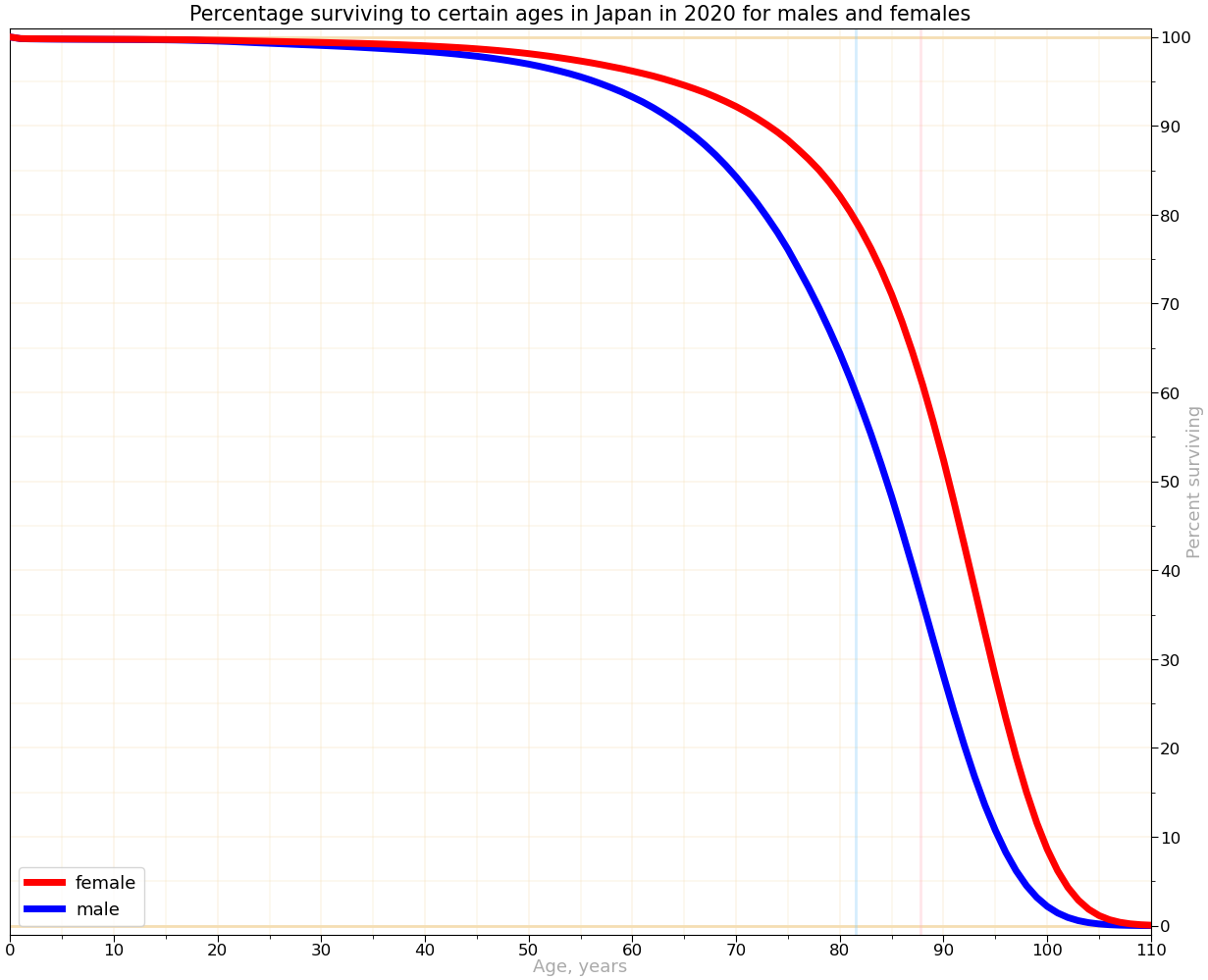
The percent of Japanese people surviving to certain ages by gender, 2020

The percentage surviving, is the percent of the population that would survive to certain age, if their life conditions in a given year, were extrapolated to their whole life.

The values are rounded. Difference and ratio were calculated with raw data.

Age	Japan on average			Tokyo			Kyoto			Shiga		
Age	Percentage surviving		F / M	Percentage surviving		F / M	Percentage surviving		F / M	Percentage surviving		F / M
Age	male	female	F / M	male	female	F / M	male	female	F / M	male	female	F / M
1	99.8	99.8	1.00	99.9	99.9	1.00	99.9	99.9	1.00	99.8	99.8	1.00
5	99.8	99.8	1.00	99.8	99.8	1.00	99.9	99.8	1.00	99.8	99.7	1.00
10	99.7	99.8	1.00	99.8	99.8	1.00	99.8	99.8	1.00	99.8	99.7	1.00
15	99.7	99.7	1.00	99.7	99.7	1.00	99.8	99.8	1.00	99.7	99.6	1.00
20	99.5	99.6	1.00	99.6	99.7	1.00	99.7	99.7	1.00	99.5	99.6	1.00
25	99.3	99.5	1.00	99.4	99.6	1.00	99.5	99.6	1.00	99.3	99.4	1.00
30	99.1	99.4	1.00	99.2	99.4	1.00	99.2	99.5	1.00	99.1	99.3	1.00
35	98.8	99.2	1.00	99.0	99.3	1.00	99.0	99.4	1.00	98.9	99.1	1.00
40	98.4	99.0	1.01	98.7	99.1	1.00	98.6	99.2	1.01	98.6	98.9	1.00
45	97.8	98.7	1.01	98.2	98.8	1.01	98.0	98.9	1.01	98.1	98.6	1.01
50	97.0	98.1	1.01	97.4	98.3	1.01	97.2	98.4	1.01	97.4	98.2	1.01
55	95.5	97.3	1.02	96.0	97.5	1.02	95.8	97.7	1.02	96.3	97.7	1.01
60	93.3	96.2	1.03	93.8	96.4	1.03	93.6	96.7	1.03	94.7	96.9	1.02
65	89.7	94.6	1.05	90.2	94.7	1.05	90.5	95.3	1.05	91.7	95.5	1.04
70	84.3	92.2	1.09	84.6	92.2	1.09	85.6	93.2	1.09	86.9	93.5	1.08
75	76.1	88.4	1.16	76.1	88.3	1.16	77.9	89.6	1.15	79.5	90.1	1.13
80	64.4	82.1	1.27	64.3	82.1	1.28	66.6	83.6	1.25	68.9	84.3	1.22
85	48.3	71.0	1.47	48.4	71.4	1.48	50.7	72.9	1.44	52.9	73.7	1.39
90	28.1	52.4	1.86	28.7	53.3	1.86	30.4	54.7	1.80	31.7	54.9	1.73
95	10.7	28.0	2.61	11.4	29.2	2.56	12.1	30.5	2.53	12.3	29.5	2.40
100	2.171	8.611	3.97	2.490	9.227	3.71	2.556	9.984	3.91	2.410	8.691	3.61
105	0.192	1.136	5.92	0.246	1.256	5.11	0.236	1.442	6.11	0.195	1.033	5.30
110	0.007	0.054	7.71	0.010	0.062	6.20	0.009	0.076	8.44	0.006	0.042	7.00

Data source: National Institute of Population and Social Security Research

== Ministry of Health, Labour and Welfare of Japan (2015) ==
Map of Japanese prefectures by life expectancy (2015)

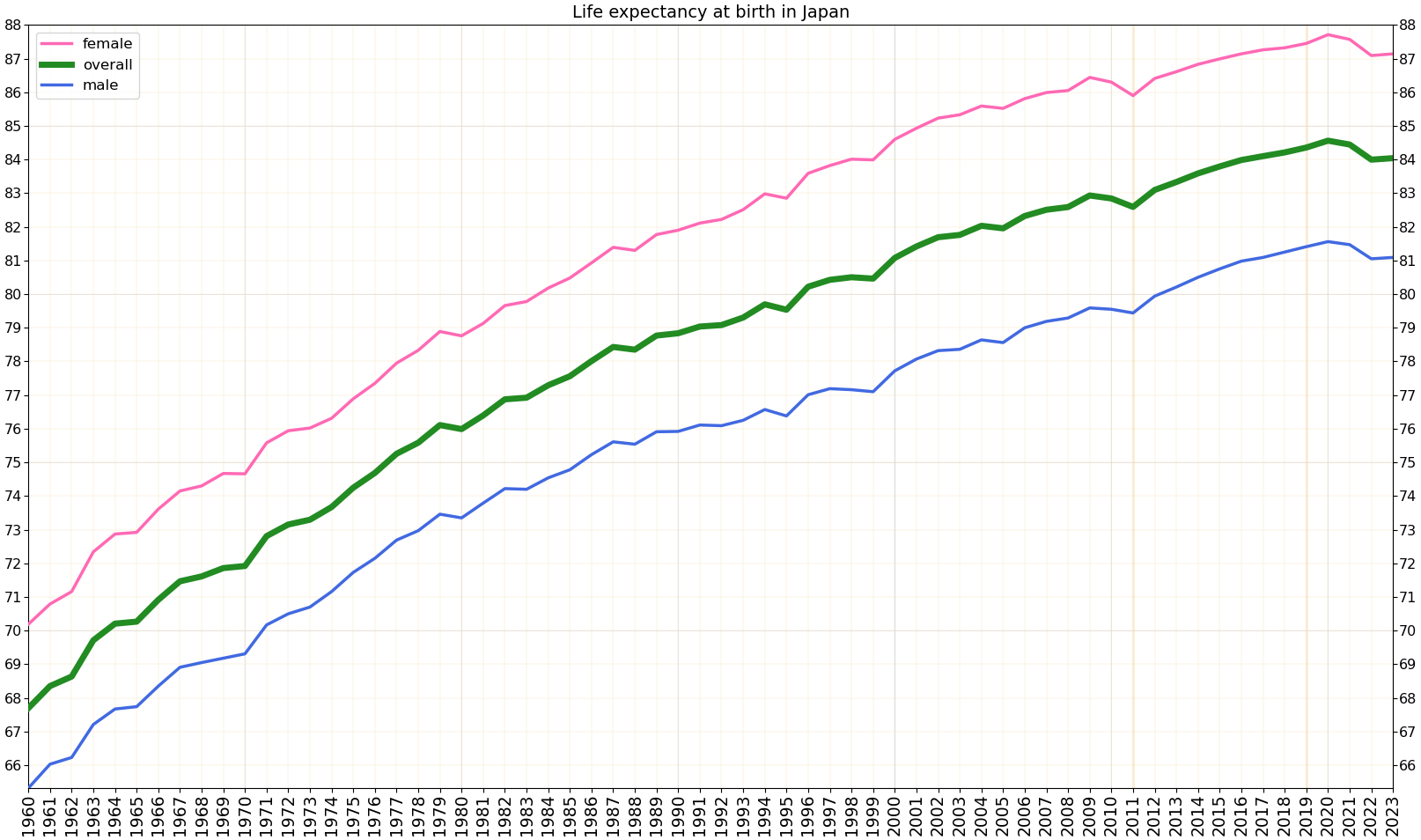
Development of life expectancy in Japan according to estimation of the World Bank Group

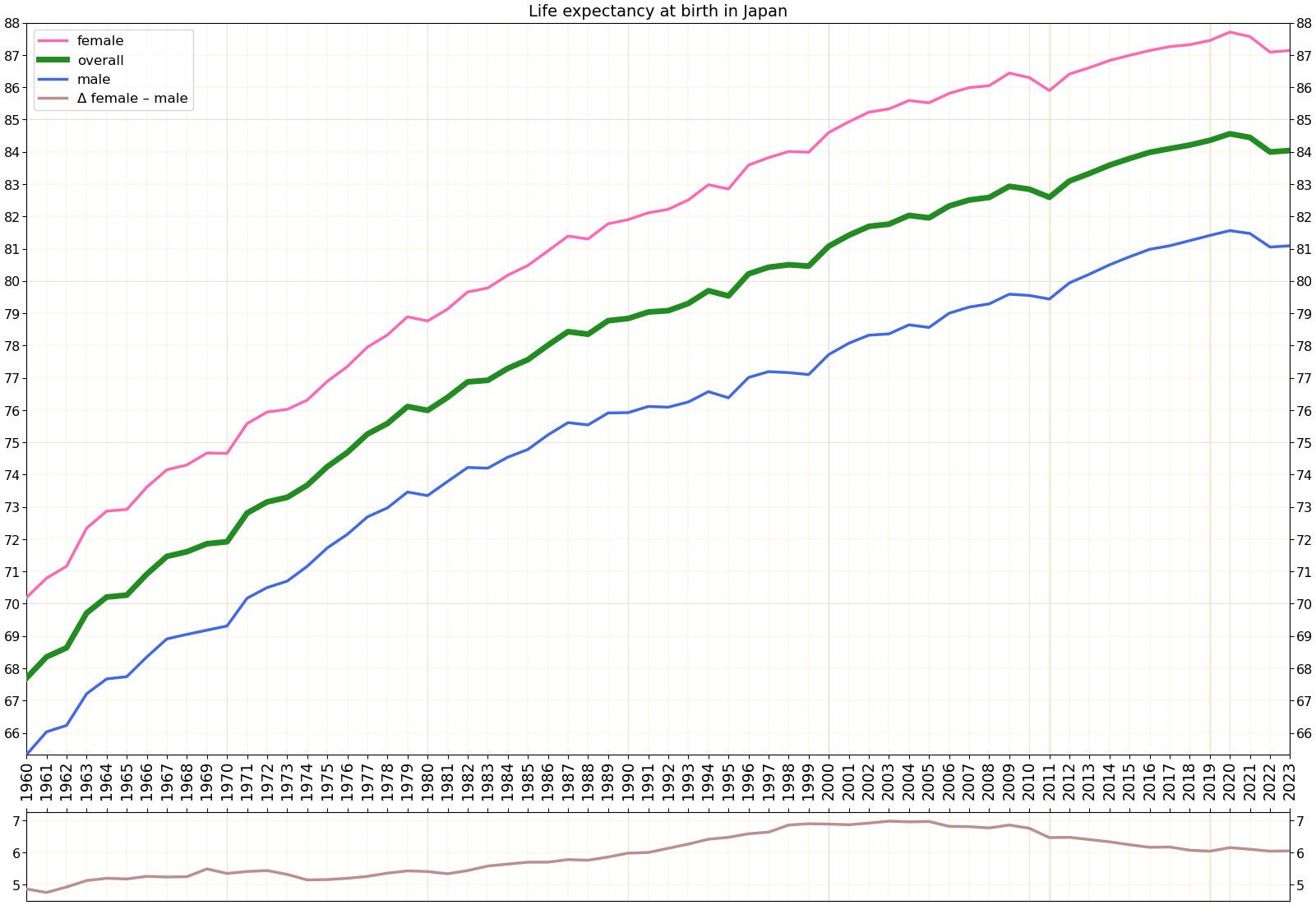
Life expectancy with calculated gender gap

Life expectancy in Japan according to estimation of the Our World in Data

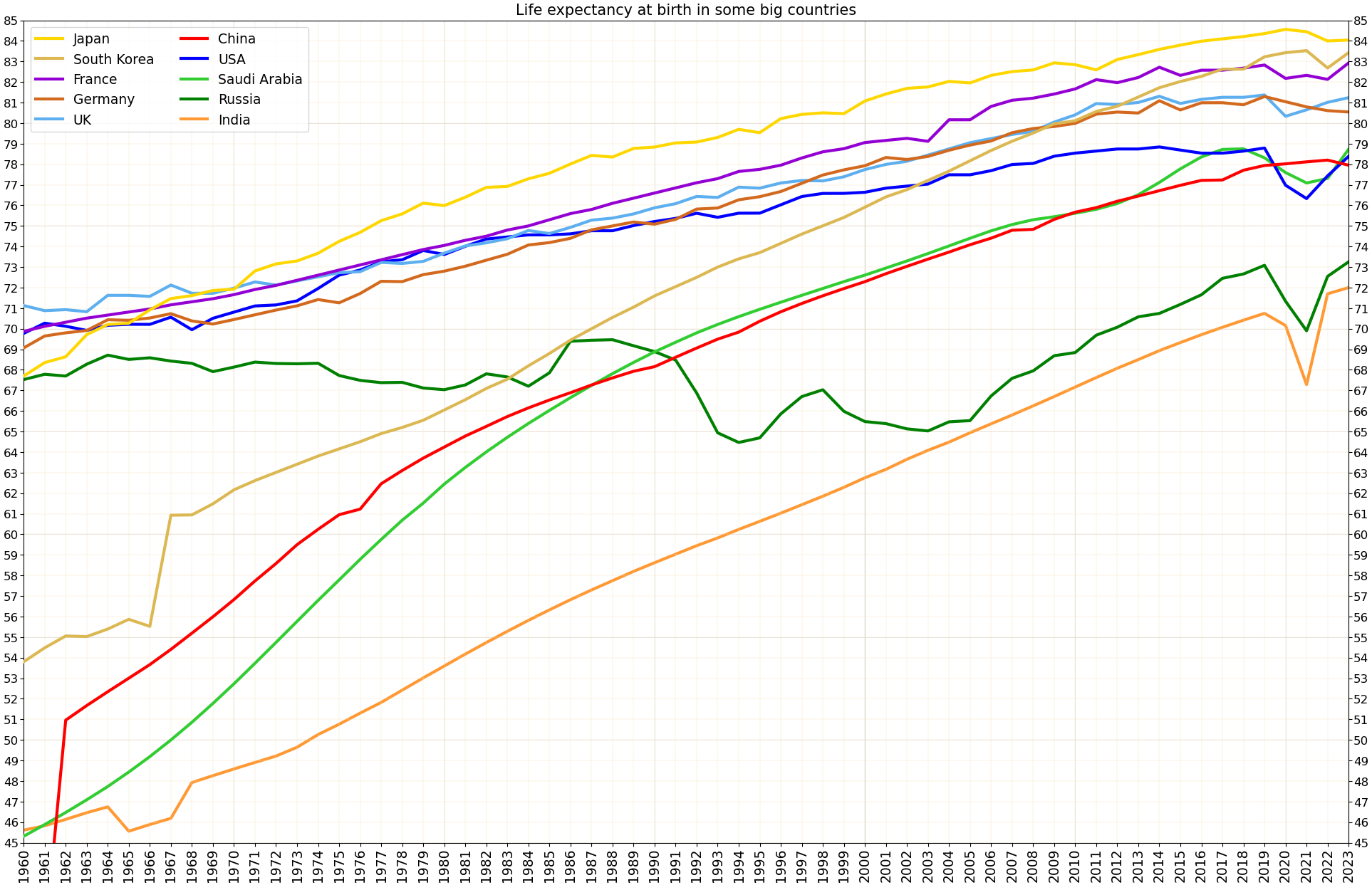
Development of life expectancy in Japan in comparison to other big countries of the world

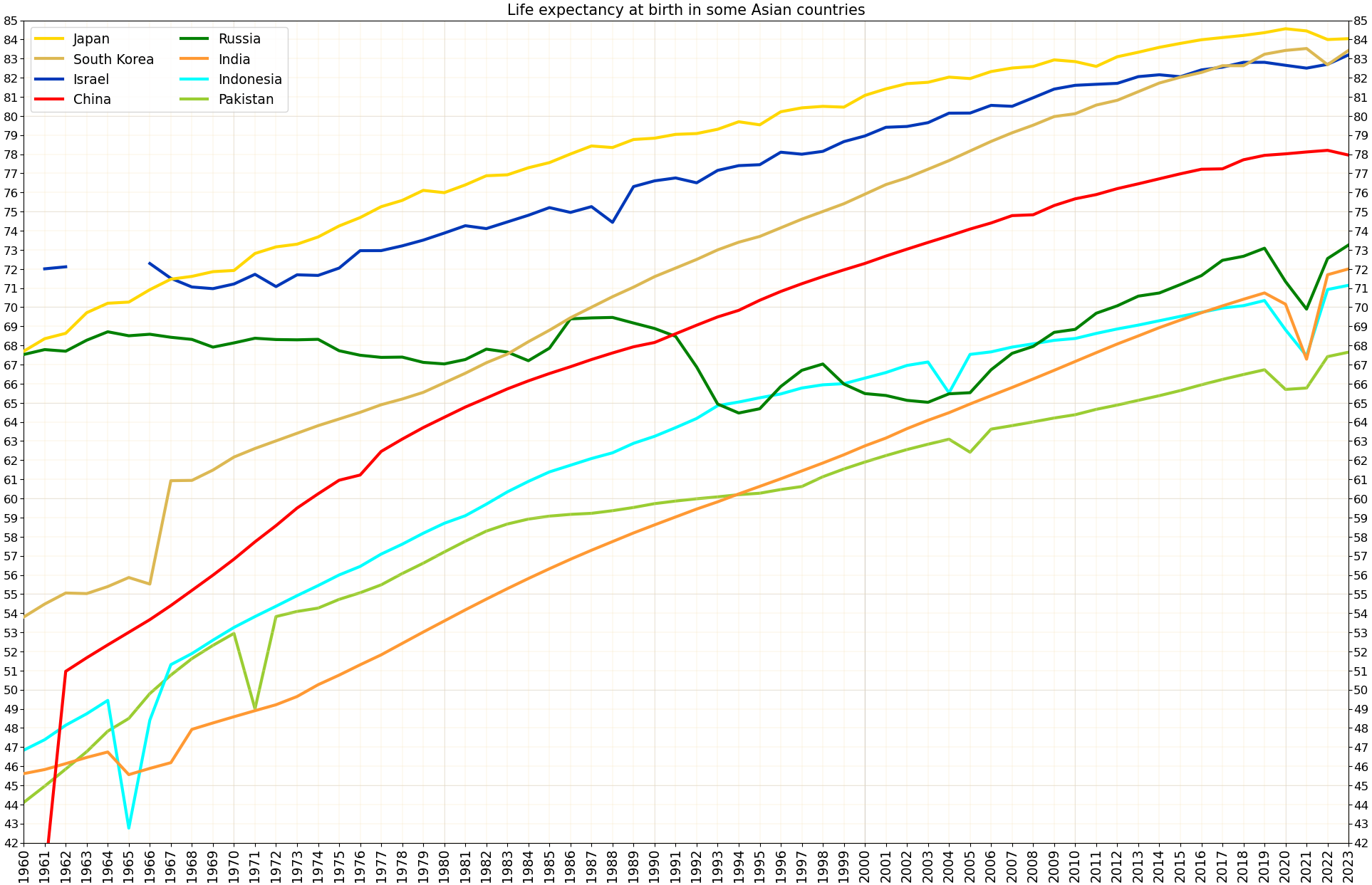
Development of life expectancy in Japan in comparison to other big countries of Asia

Life expectancy and healthy life expectancy in Japan on the background of other countries of the world in 2019

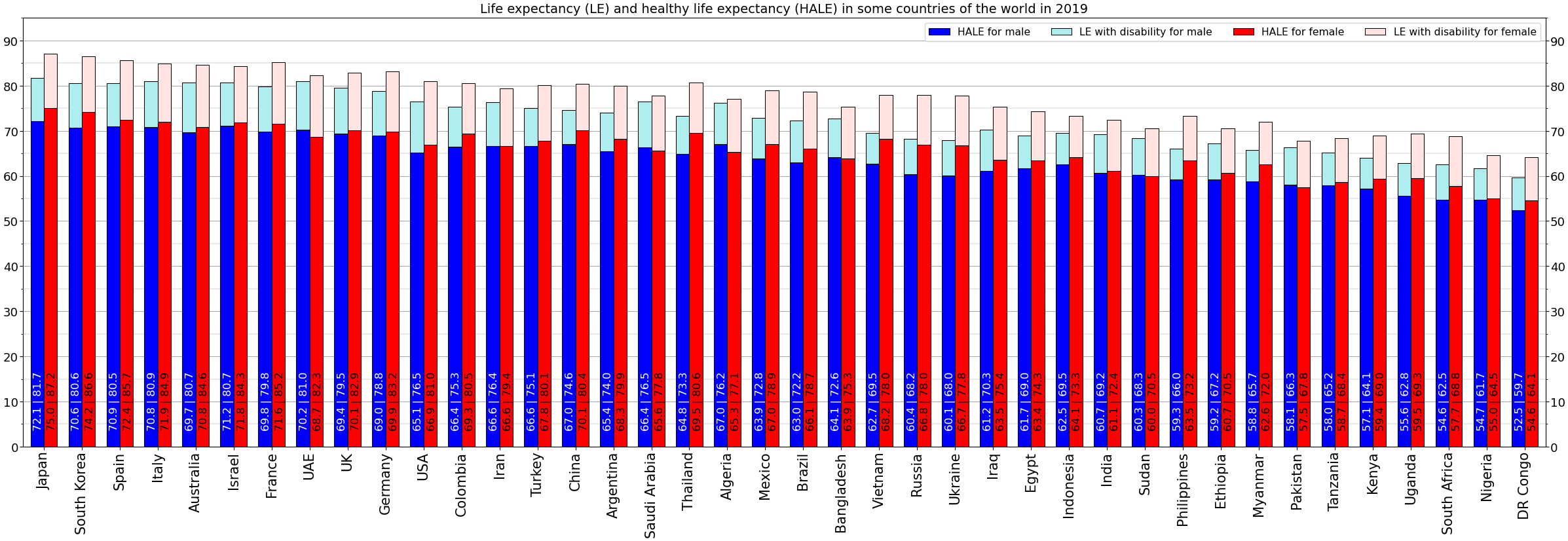
Life expectancy and healthy life expectancy for males and females

Prefectures by life expectancy at birth according to Ministry of Health, Labour and Welfare of Japan. The total life expectancy is calculated out of the averages for men and women.

Rank	Prefecture	Life expectancy		
Rank	Prefecture	Total	Men	Women
1	Nagano	84.72	81.75	87.68
2	Shiga	84.68	81.78	87.57
3	Fukui	84.41	81.27	87.54
4	Kyoto	84.38	81.40	87.35
5	Kumamoto	84.36	81.22	87.49
6	Okayama	84.35	81.03	87.67
7	Nara	84.31	81.36	87.25
8	Kanagawa	84.28	81.32	87.24
9	Shimane	84.22	80.79	87.64
10	Hiroshima	84.21	81.08	87.33
11	Ōita	84.20	81.08	87.31
12	Tokyo	84.17	81.07	87.26
13	Ishikawa	84.16	81.04	87.28
14	Miyagi	84.08	80.99	87.16
15	Yamanashi	84.04	80.85	87.22
16	Shizuoka	84.03	80.95	87.10
16	Kagawa	84.03	80.85	87.21
18	Toyama	84.02	80.61	87.42
19	Niigata	84.01	80.69	87.32
20	Hyōgo	84.00	80.92	87.07
21	Aichi	83.98	81.10	86.86
22	Chiba	83.94	80.96	86.91
23	Mie	83.93	80.86	86.99
24	Gifu	83.91	81.00	86.82
25	Fukuoka	83.90	80.66	87.14
26	Saga	83.89	80.65	87.12
27	Okinawa	83.86	80.27	87.44
28	Saitama	83.74	80.82	86.66
29	Yamagata	83.74	80.52	86.96
30	Gunma	83.73	80.61	86.84
31	Miyazaki	83.73	80.34	87.12
32	Tottori	83.72	80.17	87.27
33	Yamaguchi	83.70	80.51	86.88
34	Nagasaki	83.68	80.38	86.97
35	Kochi	83.64	80.26	87.01
36	Hokkaido	83.53	80.28	86.77
37	Tokushima	83.49	80.32	86.66
38	Ehime	83.49	80.16	86.82
39	Osaka	83.48	80.23	86.73
40	Kagoshima	83.40	80.02	86.78
41	Ibaraki	83.31	80.28	86.33
42	Fukushima	83.26	80.12	86.40
43	Wakayama	83.21	79.94	86.47
44	Tochigi	83.17	80.10	86.24
45	Iwate	83.15	79.86	86.44
46	Akita	82.95	79.51	86.38
47	Aomori	82.30	78.67	85.93
	Japan	83.89	80.77	87.01

== Global Data Lab (2022) ==
region	2019				2019 →2021	2021	2021 →2022	2022				2019 →2022
region	overall	male	female	F Δ M	2019 →2021	overall	2021 →2022	overall	male	female	F Δ M	2019 →2022
Japan on average	84.43	81.38	87.43	6.05	0.35	84.78	0.04	84.82	81.78	87.83	6.05	0.39
Chūgoku region (Tottori, Shimane, Okayama, Hiroshima, Yamaguchi)	84.68	—	—	—	0.37	85.05	0.03	85.08	81.97	88.17	6.20	0.40
Southern-Kantō (Saitama, Chiba, Tokyo, Kanagawa, Yamanashi, Nagano)	84.58	—	—	—	0.31	84.89	0.04	84.93	81.98	87.85	5.87	0.35
Hokuriku region (Niigata, Toyama, Ishikawa, Fukui)	84.56	—	—	—	0.31	84.87	0.04	84.91	81.86	87.93	6.07	0.35
Tōkai region (Gifu, Shizuoka, Aichi, Mie)	84.46	—	—	—	0.31	84.77	0.04	84.81	81.96	87.64	5.68	0.35
Kansai region (Shiga, Kyoto, Osaka, Hyōgo, Nara, Wakayama)	84.40	—	—	—	0.29	84.69	0.04	84.73	81.62	87.81	6.19	0.33
Kyushu (Fukuoka, Saga, Nagasaki, Kumamoto, Ōita, Miyazaki, Kagoshima, Okinawa)	84.37	—	—	—	0.31	84.68	0.04	84.72	81.53	87.88	6.35	0.35
Shikoku (Tokushima, Kagawa, Ehime, Kōchi)	84.18	—	—	—	0.31	84.49	0.04	84.53	81.40	87.63	6.23	0.35
Tōhoku region (Aomori, Iwate, Miyagi, Akita, Yamagata, Fukushima)	83.81	—	—	—	0.35	84.16	0.04	84.20	81.13	87.23	6.10	0.39
Northern-Kantō, Koshin (Ibaraki, Tochigi, Gunma)	83.84	—	—	—	0.30	84.14	0.04	84.18	81.21	87.11	5.90	0.34
Hokkaido	83.87	—	—	—	0.28	84.15	0.03	84.18	81.14	87.20	6.06	0.31

Data source: Global Data Lab

== See also ==
- List of countries by life expectancy
- List of Asian countries by life expectancy
- Administrative divisions of Japan
- Standard of living in Japan
- Life table
