= Brisbane Line =

Supposed Australian defence proposal in World War II

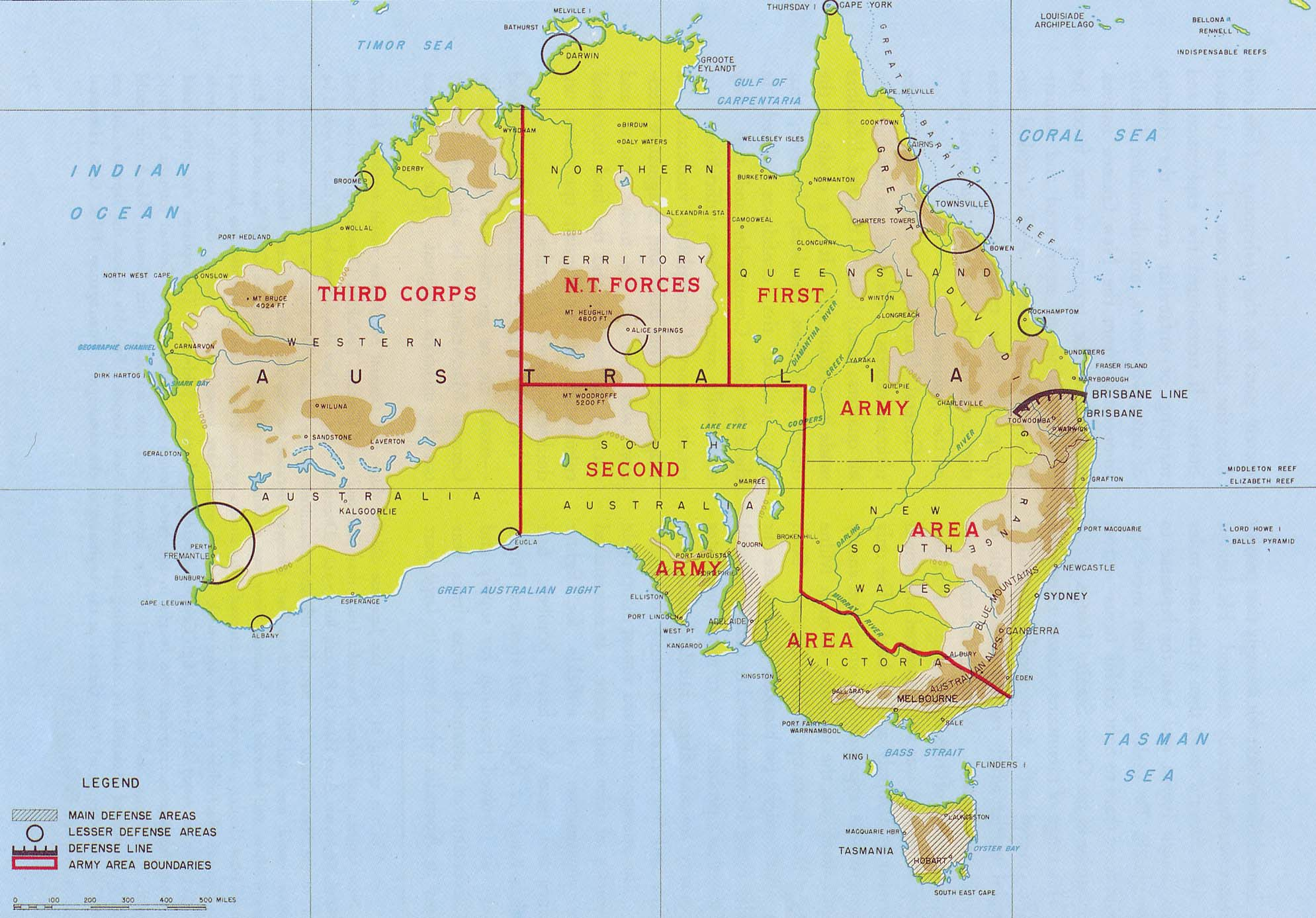
A map showing Australian defensive concentrations in 1942 from General MacArthur's official report. The 'Brisbane line' is shown as a short black line to the north of Brisbane.

The "Brisbane Line" was a defence proposal supposedly formulated during World War II to concede the northern portion of the Australian continent in the event of an invasion by the Japanese. Although a plan to prioritise defence in the vital industrial regions between Brisbane and Melbourne in the event of invasion had been proposed in February 1942, it was rejected by Labor Prime Minister John Curtin and the Australian War Cabinet. An incomplete understanding of this proposal and other planned responses to invasion led Labor minister Eddie Ward to publicly allege that the previous government (a United Australia Party-Country Party coalition under Robert Menzies and Arthur Fadden) had planned to abandon most of northern Australia to the Japanese.

Ward continued to promote the idea during late 1942 and early 1943, and the idea that it was an actual defence strategy gained support after General Douglas MacArthur referred to it during a press conference in March 1943, where he also coined the term "Brisbane Line". Ward initially offered no evidence to support his claims, but later claimed that the relevant records had been removed from the official files. A Royal Commission concluded that no such documents had existed, and the government under Menzies and Fadden had not approved plans of the type alleged by Ward. The controversy contributed to Labor's win in the 1943 federal election, although Ward was assigned to minor portfolios afterward.

== Ward's allegations ==
In October 1942, Labor politician Eddie Ward, the Minister for Labour and National Service under Prime Minister John Curtin, alleged that the preceding government under Prime Minister Robert Menzies (and his successor, Prime Minister Arthur Fadden) had prepared plans to abandon the majority of the continent as soon as the Japanese invaded, and concentrate defensive efforts on the south-eastern region. Ward had apparently been leaked the information by a Major working in the Secretary for Defence Office.

A memorandum had been submitted to the Australian War Cabinet in February 1942 (after Menzies, Fadden, and the United Australia Party-Country Party coalition had moved to Opposition), where the General Officer Commanding-in-Chief of the Home Forces, Lieutenant-General Iven Mackay, had advocated that in the event of an invasion, the majority of available Australian forces be concentrated in the area between Brisbane and Melbourne, where most of the nation's industrial capability was located. Mackay had previously been instructed to prioritise the regions around Sydney and Newcastle, with Darwin as a secondary priority, and had to consider the fact that a large portion of Australia's military and naval forces were deployed overseas. Ward's theory was based on an incomplete understanding of this plan (which had been submitted to and rejected by Ward's own government, catered for the defence of strategic northern locations, including Darwin and Townsville, and instead of simply abandoning the rest of the country to the Japanese, advocated a scorched earth policy and guerrilla warfare to slow invaders until other forces could be deployed), along with public knowledge of evacuation plans for regions of Queensland (which, instead of a total evacuation south, was to clear potential battle sites of civilians).

Ward did not present any direct evidence of his claims at the time, and Menzies, along with all the ministers that had served under him during the previous government, denied the allegation. At an Advisory War Council meeting in December 1942, Menzies, among others, expressed concern that a responsible minister was making claims that could only be disproved through the disclosure of secret defence plans. Curtin did little to quell Ward's attacks, and Ward continued to claim that Menzies and Fadden were responsible for the "defeatist" and "treacherous" plan. Public awareness of the alleged plan was raised when General Douglas MacArthur referred to it during a press conference in March 1943, during which he coined the term 'Brisbane Line'. Ward repeated his assertions over the following months, and when asked to provide proof, claimed that he had been informed of the removal of documents relating to the plan from the official files.

== Royal Commission and aftermath ==
Curtin appointed a Royal Commission led by Charles Lowe to determine if such documents had existed, and if the Menzies administration had made such plans. The Commission reported in July 1943 that there was no evidence supporting an official plan to abandon most of Australia to invading forces, and that the files for the time in question were complete. The royal commission and the Brisbane Line controversy contributed to Curtin and the Labor Party winning the 1943 federal election by a significant margin, but Ward was effectively demoted by being assigned the portfolios of Transport (the assets of which were under direct Army control) and External Territories (most of which had been captured by the Japanese).

== Post-war claims ==
Proponents of the existence of the Brisbane Line proposal often refer to the existence of concrete tank traps near places such as Tenterfield, which were constructed in the late 1930s, as evidence.

In his memoir, Reminiscences, MacArthur claims that the Australian military had proposed designating a line roughly following the Darling River as the focus of defence during the expected Japanese invasion of Australia. MacArthur credits himself with the plan's dismissal in favour of offensive operations to stop Japanese advancement in New Guinea.
