= Institute of Population Problems =

Domestic assembly in Japan

The Institute of Population Problems was a domestic assembly appointed by the Japanese Government in 1939. It helped to address the imbalance between population and resources that Japan faced following the introduction of Western medicine. Its first major solution was an urging of the Japanese government to make contraception available, emphasising that abortion was not the best solution.

In 1996, the Institute of Population Problems merged with the Social Development Research Institute to form the National Institute of Population and Social Security Research.
