= National Institute of Population and Social Security Research =

Japanese research institute

- 国立社会保障・人口問題研究所; Kokuritsu Shakai-hoshō Jinkō-mondai Kenkyūjo

Research Institute overview
- Formed: 1996
- Preceding Research Institute: Institute of Population Problems
- Jurisdiction: Ministry of Health, Labour and Welfare
- Headquarters: 35.6703°N 139.7543°E
- Website: www.ipss.go.jp

The National Institute of Population and Social Security Research (国立社会保障・人口問題研究所, Kokuritsu Shakai Hoshō Jinkō Mondai Kenkyūjo; IPSS) is a national research institute in Japan. It was established in 1996 through the merger of the Institute of Population Problems (1939–) and the Social Development Research Institute (1965–). It is an affiliated institution of the Ministry of Health, Labour and Welfare.

During the period of dramatic economic growth following World War II, Japan's life-expectancy increased with fertility decreased. This has led to explosive growth in the cost of social security programs with a continuing decline in the workforce.

The mission of the IPSS is to collect accurate and detailed data regarding the current state of the Japanese population and its fertility rate and to produce highly accurate estimations of future trends based on careful scientific analyses perforated on that data. The IPSS also conducts research concerning social security policies and systems in Japan and abroad.

== IPSS Statistics ==
Population Projections for Japan (2023)

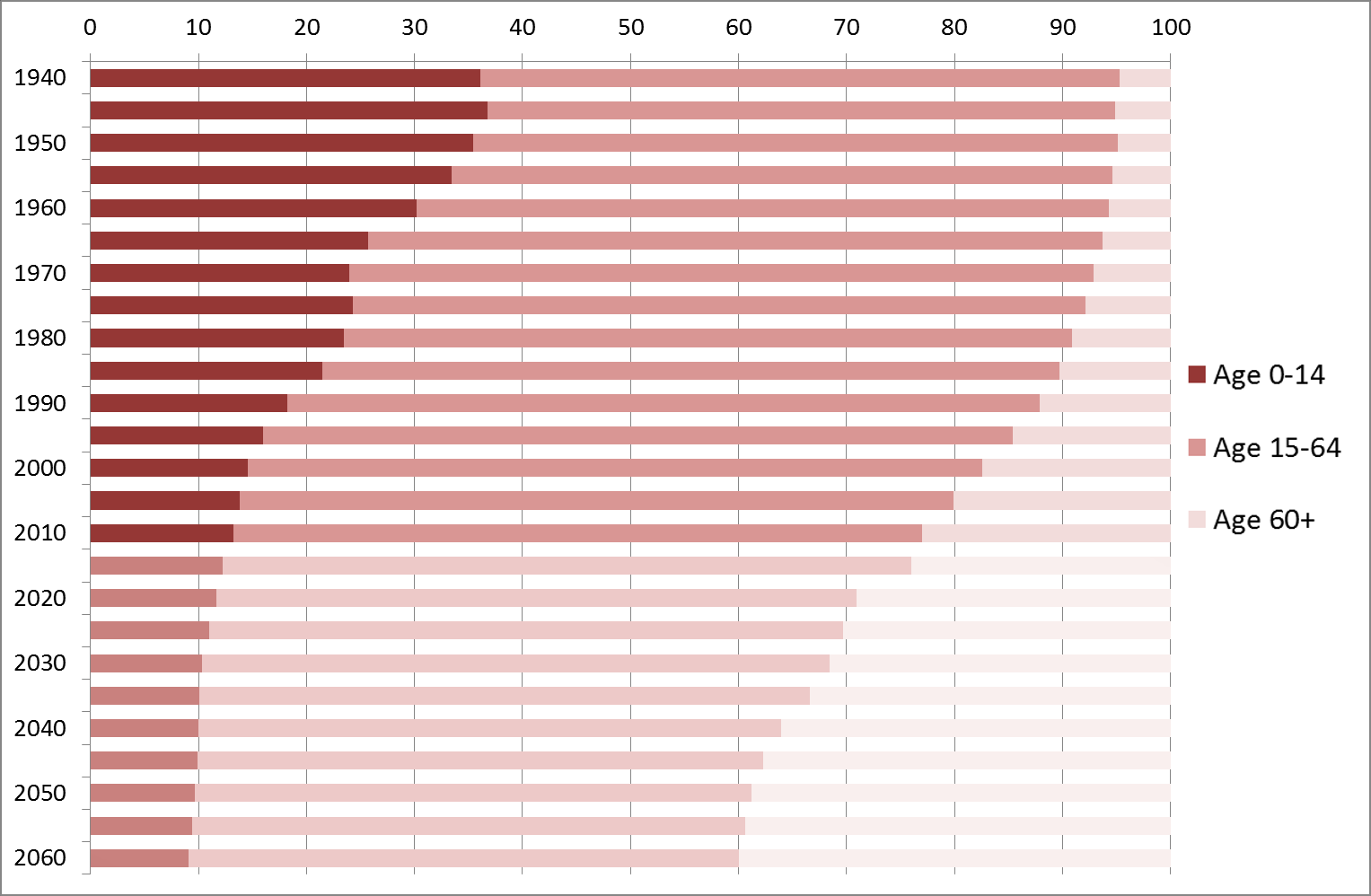
Japan Age Makeup with Projection

Births and Total fertility rate of Japan

Social expenditure of Japan

== See also ==
- Welfare in Japan
- Demographics of Japan
- Aging of Japan
