= List of regions of Kazakhstan by Human Development Index =

Map of the Kazakhstani regions by Human Development Index in 2018. > 0.835 0.835 – 0.811 0.810 – 0.805 < 0.805

This is a list of Regions of Kazakhstan by Human Development Index as of 2025 with data for the year 2023.

Rank	Region	HDI (2023)
Very high human development
1	Almaty	0.867
2	Karaganda Region	0.859
3	Akmola Region, Astana, Kostanay Region, North Kazakhstan Region, Pavlodar Region	0.852
–	Kazakhstan	0.837
4	Aktobe Region, Atyrau Region, Mangystau Region, West Kazakhstan Region	0.829
5	East Kazakhstan Region	0.821
6	Almaty Region, Jambyl Region, Kyzylorda Region, Turkistan Region	0.820

== See also ==
- List of regions of Kazakhstan by GDP
- List of regions of Kazakhstan by life expectancy
- List of regions of Uzbekistan by Human Development Index
- List of regions of Kyrgyzstan by Human Development Index
- List of regions of Turkmenistan by Human Development Index
- List of federal subjects of Russia by Human Development Index
- List of administrative divisions of Greater China by Human Development Index
