= List of Asian regions by life expectancy =

This is a list of Asian regions according to estimation of the Global Data Lab, as of 18 October 2024. By default, regions within country are sorted by overall life expectancy in 2022. Countries are sorted by the most favorable for life expectancy region inside them.

| country or special territory | region | 2019 | | | | 2019 →2021 | 2021 | 2021 →2022 | 2022 | | | | 2019 →2022 |
| country or special territory | region | overall | male | female | F Δ M | 2019 →2021 | overall | 2021 →2022 | overall | male | female | F Δ M | 2019 →2022 |
|---|---|---|---|---|---|---|---|---|---|---|---|---|---|
| South Korea | Jeju | 85.20 | 78.88 | 86.20 | 7.32 | 0.04 | 85.24 | 0.33 | 85.57 | 79.27 | 86.59 | 7.32 | 0.37 |
| South Korea | Capital Region (Seoul and Gyeonggi Province) | 84.68 | 81.02 | 86.86 | 5.84 | 0.05 | 84.73 | 0.33 | 85.06 | 81.41 | 87.25 | 5.84 | 0.38 |
| South Korea | Chungcheong Region | 83.96 | 79.90 | 86.47 | 6.57 | 0.05 | 84.01 | 0.32 | 84.33 | 80.29 | 86.86 | 6.57 | 0.37 |
| South Korea | Jeolla Region | 83.45 | 79.19 | 86.81 | 7.62 | 0.04 | 83.49 | 0.33 | 83.82 | 79.57 | 87.20 | 7.63 | 0.37 |
| South Korea | Gyeongnam Region | 83.14 | 79.84 | 86.30 | 6.46 | 0.04 | 83.18 | 0.33 | 83.51 | 80.23 | 86.69 | 6.46 | 0.37 |
| South Korea | Gyeongbuk Region | 83.14 | 79.54 | 85.59 | 6.05 | 0.04 | 83.18 | 0.33 | 83.51 | 79.93 | 85.98 | 6.05 | 0.37 |
| South Korea | Gangwon Region | 82.63 | 80.05 | 86.86 | 6.81 | 0.04 | 82.67 | 0.32 | 82.99 | 80.44 | 87.25 | 6.81 | 0.36 |
| Japan | Chūgoku region (Tottori, Shimane, Okayama, Hiroshima, Yamaguchi) | 84.68 | — | — | — | 0.37 | 85.05 | 0.03 | 85.08 | 81.97 | 88.17 | 6.20 | 0.40 |
| Japan | Southern-Kantō (Saitama, Chiba, Tokyo, Kanagawa, Yamanashi, Nagano) | 84.58 | — | — | — | 0.31 | 84.89 | 0.04 | 84.93 | 81.98 | 87.85 | 5.87 | 0.35 |
| Japan | Hokuriku region (Niigata, Toyama, Ishikawa, Fukui) | 84.56 | — | — | — | 0.31 | 84.87 | 0.04 | 84.91 | 81.86 | 87.93 | 6.07 | 0.35 |
| Japan | Tōkai region (Gifu, Shizuoka, Aichi, Mie) | 84.46 | — | — | — | 0.31 | 84.77 | 0.04 | 84.81 | 81.96 | 87.64 | 5.68 | 0.35 |
| Japan | Kansai region (Shiga, Kyoto, Osaka, Hyōgo, Nara, Wakayama) | 84.40 | — | — | — | 0.29 | 84.69 | 0.04 | 84.73 | 81.62 | 87.81 | 6.19 | 0.33 |
| Japan | Kyushu (Fukuoka, Saga, Nagasaki, Kumamoto, Ōita, Miyazaki, Kagoshima, Okinawa) | 84.37 | — | — | — | 0.31 | 84.68 | 0.04 | 84.72 | 81.53 | 87.88 | 6.35 | 0.35 |
| Japan | Shikoku (Tokushima, Kagawa, Ehime, Kōchi) | 84.18 | — | — | — | 0.31 | 84.49 | 0.04 | 84.53 | 81.40 | 87.63 | 6.23 | 0.35 |
| Japan | Tōhoku region (Aomori, Iwate, Miyagi, Akita, Yamagata, Fukushima) | 83.81 | — | — | — | 0.35 | 84.16 | 0.04 | 84.20 | 81.13 | 87.23 | 6.10 | 0.39 |
| Japan | Northern-Kantō, Koshin (Ibaraki, Tochigi, Gunma) | 83.84 | — | — | — | 0.30 | 84.14 | 0.04 | 84.18 | 81.21 | 87.11 | 5.90 | 0.34 |
| Japan | Hokkaido | 83.87 | — | — | — | 0.28 | 84.15 | 0.03 | 84.18 | 81.14 | 87.20 | 6.06 | 0.31 |
| Singapore | — | 83.76 | 81.58 | 85.91 | 4.33 | −1.01 | 82.75 | 1.38 | 84.13 | 81.98 | 86.30 | 4.32 | 0.37 |
| China | Shanghai | 82.38 | 80.11 | 84.68 | 4.57 | 0.17 | 82.55 | 0.40 | 82.95 | 80.75 | 85.14 | 4.39 | 0.57 |
| China | Beijing | 82.32 | 80.16 | 84.43 | 4.27 | 0.17 | 82.49 | 0.40 | 82.89 | 80.79 | 84.89 | 4.10 | 0.57 |
| China | Tianjin | 81.11 | 79.07 | 83.16 | 4.09 | 0.19 | 81.30 | 0.39 | 81.69 | 79.67 | 83.66 | 3.99 | 0.58 |
| China | Zhejiang | 80.00 | 77.78 | 82.39 | 4.61 | 0.19 | 80.19 | 0.38 | 80.57 | 78.44 | 82.84 | 4.40 | 0.57 |
| China | Jiangsu | 79.11 | 76.72 | 81.57 | 4.85 | 0.21 | 79.32 | 0.38 | 79.70 | 77.36 | 82.09 | 4.73 | 0.59 |
| China | Guangdong | 79.08 | 76.42 | 81.98 | 5.56 | 0.23 | 79.31 | 0.38 | 79.69 | 77.09 | 82.48 | 5.39 | 0.61 |
| China | Shandong | 78.96 | 76.16 | 81.85 | 5.69 | 0.22 | 79.18 | 0.38 | 79.56 | 76.80 | 82.37 | 5.57 | 0.60 |
| China | Hainan | 78.83 | 75.51 | 82.60 | 7.09 | 0.22 | 79.05 | 0.38 | 79.43 | 76.17 | 83.10 | 6.93 | 0.60 |
| China | Liaoning | 78.50 | 75.72 | 81.32 | 5.60 | 0.18 | 78.68 | 0.38 | 79.06 | 76.30 | 81.80 | 5.50 | 0.56 |
| China | Chongqing | 78.33 | 75.54 | 81.38 | 5.84 | 0.23 | 78.56 | 0.38 | 78.94 | 76.20 | 81.90 | 5.70 | 0.61 |
| China | Fujian | 78.27 | 75.50 | 81.31 | 5.81 | 0.22 | 78.49 | 0.38 | 78.87 | 76.15 | 81.81 | 5.66 | 0.60 |
| China | Jilin | 78.24 | 75.42 | 81.15 | 5.73 | 0.17 | 78.41 | 0.38 | 78.79 | 75.96 | 81.66 | 5.70 | 0.55 |
| China | Heilongjiang | 78.08 | 75.10 | 81.21 | 6.11 | 0.17 | 78.25 | 0.38 | 78.63 | 75.67 | 81.68 | 6.01 | 0.55 |
| China | Guangxi | 77.82 | 74.30 | 81.73 | 7.43 | 0.24 | 78.06 | 0.37 | 78.43 | 74.97 | 82.24 | 7.27 | 0.61 |
| China | Hubei | 77.74 | 75.37 | 80.26 | 4.89 | 0.26 | 78.00 | 0.37 | 78.37 | 76.07 | 80.78 | 4.71 | 0.63 |
| China | Anhui | 77.73 | 75.18 | 80.48 | 5.30 | 0.23 | 77.96 | 0.37 | 78.33 | 75.86 | 80.97 | 5.11 | 0.60 |
| China | Shanxi | 77.66 | 75.31 | 80.20 | 4.89 | 0.25 | 77.91 | 0.37 | 78.28 | 75.98 | 80.72 | 4.74 | 0.62 |
| China | Hunan | 77.62 | 75.00 | 80.47 | 5.47 | 0.26 | 77.88 | 0.37 | 78.25 | 75.70 | 81.00 | 5.30 | 0.63 |
| China | Shaanxi | 77.54 | 75.26 | 79.94 | 4.68 | 0.26 | 77.80 | 0.37 | 78.17 | 75.93 | 80.49 | 4.56 | 0.63 |
| China | Sichuan | 77.54 | 74.68 | 80.64 | 5.96 | 0.25 | 77.79 | 0.37 | 78.16 | 75.34 | 81.18 | 5.84 | 0.62 |
| China | Hebei | 77.53 | 74.90 | 80.26 | 5.36 | 0.22 | 77.75 | 0.37 | 78.12 | 75.53 | 80.77 | 5.24 | 0.59 |
| China | Jiangxi | 77.36 | 74.71 | 80.22 | 5.51 | 0.28 | 77.64 | 0.37 | 78.01 | 75.41 | 80.77 | 5.36 | 0.65 |
| China | Henan | 77.35 | 74.26 | 80.56 | 6.30 | 0.25 | 77.60 | 0.37 | 77.97 | 74.92 | 81.09 | 6.17 | 0.62 |
| China | Inner Mongolia | 77.30 | 74.63 | 80.18 | 5.55 | 0.26 | 77.56 | 0.37 | 77.93 | 75.31 | 80.70 | 5.39 | 0.63 |
| China | Ningxia | 76.31 | 74.48 | 78.18 | 3.70 | 0.27 | 76.58 | 0.37 | 76.95 | 75.22 | 78.65 | 3.43 | 0.64 |
| China | Xinjiang | 75.37 | 73.27 | 77.63 | 4.36 | 0.28 | 75.65 | 0.36 | 76.01 | 73.99 | 78.14 | 4.15 | 0.64 |
| China | Gansu | 75.35 | 73.28 | 77.52 | 4.24 | 0.29 | 75.64 | 0.36 | 76.00 | 73.97 | 78.10 | 4.13 | 0.65 |
| China | Guizhou | 74.84 | 71.67 | 78.29 | 6.62 | 0.36 | 75.20 | 0.36 | 75.56 | 72.41 | 78.96 | 6.55 | 0.72 |
| China | Yunnan | 73.62 | 70.54 | 77.08 | 6.54 | 0.40 | 74.02 | 0.36 | 74.38 | 71.30 | 77.79 | 6.49 | 0.76 |
| China | Qinghai | 73.61 | 71.31 | 76.04 | 4.73 | 0.35 | 73.96 | 0.35 | 74.31 | 72.04 | 76.67 | 4.63 | 0.70 |
| China | Tibet | 71.84 | 69.83 | 74.32 | 4.49 | 0.35 | 72.19 | 0.35 | 72.54 | 70.58 | 74.99 | 4.41 | 0.70 |
| Israel | — | 82.81 | 80.87 | 84.66 | 3.79 | −0.55 | 82.26 | 0.34 | 82.60 | 80.63 | 84.51 | 3.88 | −0.21 |
| Maldives | North Central | 81.34 | 80.48 | 82.59 | 2.11 | −0.20 | 81.14 | 0.93 | 82.07 | 81.23 | 83.29 | 2.06 | 0.73 |
| Maldives | South Central | 80.42 | 79.61 | 81.51 | 1.90 | −0.20 | 80.22 | 0.92 | 81.14 | 80.35 | 82.20 | 1.85 | 0.72 |
| Maldives | Central | 80.40 | 79.59 | 81.50 | 1.91 | −0.20 | 80.20 | 0.93 | 81.13 | 80.34 | 82.18 | 1.84 | 0.73 |
| Maldives | North | 79.86 | 79.08 | 80.86 | 1.78 | −0.20 | 79.66 | 0.92 | 80.58 | 79.82 | 81.54 | 1.72 | 0.72 |
| Maldives | Malé (capital) | 79.73 | 78.95 | 80.71 | 1.76 | −0.20 | 79.53 | 0.92 | 80.45 | 79.69 | 81.38 | 1.69 | 0.72 |
| Maldives | South | 79.72 | 78.94 | 80.69 | 1.75 | −0.20 | 79.52 | 0.92 | 80.44 | 79.68 | 81.37 | 1.69 | 0.72 |
| Cyprus * | — | 81.40 | 79.51 | 83.27 | 3.76 | −0.20 | 81.20 | 0.69 | 81.89 | 80.07 | 83.67 | 3.60 | 0.49 |
| Qatar | — | 80.99 | 80.06 | 82.65 | 2.59 | −1.72 | 79.27 | 2.29 | 81.56 | 80.63 | 83.10 | 2.47 | 0.57 |
| Kuwait | — | 79.69 | 78.25 | 82.27 | 4.02 | −1.02 | 78.67 | 1.59 | 80.26 | 78.88 | 82.75 | 3.87 | 0.57 |
| Turkey | East Black Sea Region | 79.33 | 75.62 | 82.90 | 7.28 | −1.84 | 77.49 | 2.49 | 79.98 | 76.33 | 83.45 | 7.12 | 0.65 |
| Turkey | West Anatolia Region | 78.33 | 75.15 | 81.40 | 6.25 | −1.81 | 76.52 | 2.46 | 78.98 | 75.85 | 81.95 | 6.10 | 0.65 |
| Turkey | Istanbul Region | 78.25 | 75.04 | 81.32 | 6.28 | −1.81 | 76.44 | 2.45 | 78.89 | 75.74 | 81.86 | 6.12 | 0.64 |
| Turkey | Central East Anatolia Region | 77.88 | 74.93 | 80.83 | 5.90 | −1.80 | 76.08 | 2.44 | 78.52 | 75.63 | 81.37 | 5.74 | 0.64 |
| Turkey | Mediterranean Region | 77.77 | 74.88 | 80.69 | 5.81 | −1.80 | 75.97 | 2.44 | 78.41 | 75.58 | 81.23 | 5.65 | 0.64 |
| Turkey | West Black Sea Region | 77.77 | 74.60 | 81.06 | 6.46 | −1.80 | 75.97 | 2.44 | 78.41 | 75.30 | 81.60 | 6.30 | 0.64 |
| Turkey | Central Anatolia Region | 77.60 | 74.61 | 80.57 | 5.96 | −1.80 | 75.80 | 2.44 | 78.24 | 75.31 | 81.11 | 5.80 | 0.64 |
| Turkey | Aegean Region | 77.56 | 74.35 | 80.83 | 6.48 | −1.79 | 75.77 | 2.43 | 78.20 | 75.04 | 81.37 | 6.33 | 0.64 |
| Turkey | Northeast Anatolia Region | 77.50 | 74.54 | 80.63 | 6.09 | −1.79 | 75.71 | 2.43 | 78.14 | 75.24 | 81.17 | 5.93 | 0.64 |
| Turkey | East Marmara Region | 77.46 | 74.45 | 80.47 | 6.02 | −1.79 | 75.67 | 2.43 | 78.10 | 75.15 | 81.01 | 5.86 | 0.64 |
| Turkey | Southeast Anatolia Region | 77.44 | 74.10 | 80.64 | 6.54 | −1.79 | 75.65 | 2.43 | 78.08 | 74.79 | 81.18 | 6.39 | 0.64 |
| Turkey | West Marmara Region | 77.11 | 73.77 | 80.57 | 6.80 | −1.78 | 75.33 | 2.42 | 77.75 | 74.46 | 81.11 | 6.65 | 0.64 |
| Thailand | North | 78.68 | 74.37 | 83.08 | 8.71 | −0.08 | 78.60 | 1.06 | 79.66 | 75.45 | 83.90 | 8.45 | 0.98 |
| Thailand | Bangkok | 78.97 | 74.55 | 83.56 | 9.01 | −0.46 | 78.51 | 0.87 | 79.38 | 74.99 | 83.91 | 8.92 | 0.41 |
| Thailand | Northeast | 78.87 | 74.46 | 83.44 | 8.98 | −0.45 | 78.42 | 0.86 | 79.28 | 74.90 | 83.79 | 8.89 | 0.41 |
| Thailand | South | 79.25 | 74.89 | 83.76 | 8.87 | −0.80 | 78.45 | 0.69 | 79.14 | 74.98 | 83.29 | 8.31 | −0.11 |
| Thailand | Central | 78.24 | 73.97 | 82.56 | 8.59 | −0.45 | 77.79 | 0.86 | 78.65 | 74.41 | 82.91 | 8.50 | 0.41 |
| Bhutan | Thimphu | 78.38 | 76.56 | 81.79 | 5.23 | 0.47 | 78.85 | 0.45 | 79.30 | 77.39 | 82.82 | 5.43 | 0.92 |
| Bhutan | Haa | 78.07 | 76.26 | 81.41 | 5.15 | 0.46 | 78.53 | 0.45 | 78.98 | 77.09 | 82.43 | 5.34 | 0.91 |
| Bhutan | Paro | 78.07 | 76.26 | 81.41 | 5.15 | 0.46 | 78.53 | 0.45 | 78.98 | 77.09 | 82.43 | 5.34 | 0.91 |
| Bhutan | Lhuntse | 77.09 | 75.33 | 80.23 | 4.90 | 0.46 | 77.55 | 0.44 | 77.99 | 76.15 | 81.23 | 5.08 | 0.90 |
| Bhutan | Sarpang | 74.26 | 72.62 | 76.78 | 4.16 | 0.44 | 74.70 | 0.43 | 75.13 | 73.41 | 77.74 | 4.33 | 0.87 |
| Bhutan | Dagana | 73.47 | 71.85 | 75.81 | 3.96 | 0.43 | 73.90 | 0.43 | 74.33 | 72.63 | 76.75 | 4.12 | 0.86 |
| Bhutan | Tsirang | 73.21 | 71.60 | 75.49 | 3.89 | 0.43 | 73.64 | 0.43 | 74.07 | 72.38 | 76.43 | 4.05 | 0.86 |
| Bhutan | Wangdi | 72.24 | 70.65 | 74.28 | 3.63 | 0.42 | 72.66 | 0.42 | 73.08 | 71.41 | 75.21 | 3.80 | 0.84 |
| Bhutan | Zhemgang | 72.03 | 70.44 | 74.02 | 3.58 | 0.42 | 72.45 | 0.42 | 72.87 | 71.20 | 74.95 | 3.75 | 0.84 |
| Bhutan | Punakha | 71.80 | 70.22 | 73.75 | 3.53 | 0.43 | 72.23 | 0.42 | 72.65 | 70.98 | 74.67 | 3.69 | 0.85 |
| Bhutan | Trashiyangtse | 70.98 | 69.40 | 72.72 | 3.32 | 0.42 | 71.40 | 0.41 | 71.81 | 70.16 | 73.63 | 3.47 | 0.83 |
| Bhutan | Bumthang | 70.47 | 68.90 | 72.09 | 3.19 | 0.42 | 70.89 | 0.41 | 71.30 | 69.65 | 72.99 | 3.34 | 0.83 |
| Bhutan | Trongsa | 70.11 | 68.53 | 71.64 | 3.11 | 0.42 | 70.53 | 0.40 | 70.93 | 69.28 | 72.53 | 3.25 | 0.82 |
| Bhutan | Pemagatshel | 69.28 | 67.70 | 70.60 | 2.90 | 0.42 | 69.70 | 0.40 | 70.10 | 68.43 | 71.48 | 3.05 | 0.82 |
| Bhutan | Samtse | 69.26 | 67.67 | 70.56 | 2.89 | 0.41 | 69.67 | 0.40 | 70.07 | 68.41 | 71.45 | 3.04 | 0.81 |
| Bhutan | Mongar | 69.18 | 67.60 | 70.47 | 2.87 | 0.41 | 69.59 | 0.40 | 69.99 | 68.33 | 71.35 | 3.02 | 0.81 |
| Bhutan | Chukha | 68.11 | 66.50 | 69.11 | 2.61 | 0.41 | 68.52 | 0.39 | 68.91 | 67.22 | 69.98 | 2.76 | 0.80 |
| Bhutan | Trashigang | 67.54 | 65.91 | 68.38 | 2.47 | 0.40 | 67.94 | 0.39 | 68.33 | 66.62 | 69.24 | 2.62 | 0.79 |
| Bhutan | Samdrup jongkhar | 67.09 | 65.44 | 67.81 | 2.37 | 0.40 | 67.49 | 0.39 | 67.88 | 66.15 | 68.66 | 2.51 | 0.79 |
| Bhutan | Gasa | 64.16 | 62.29 | 63.99 | 1.70 | 0.38 | 64.54 | 0.37 | 64.91 | 62.97 | 64.79 | 1.82 | 0.75 |
| Bahrain | — | 80.02 | 78.98 | 81.32 | 2.34 | −1.26 | 78.76 | 0.49 | 79.25 | 78.24 | 80.50 | 2.26 | −0.77 |
| UAE | — | 79.73 | 78.18 | 81.91 | 3.73 | −1.02 | 78.71 | 0.49 | 79.20 | 77.72 | 81.41 | 3.69 | −0.53 |
| Azerbaijan | Shaki-Zagatala ER | 77.67 | 74.66 | 81.35 | 6.69 | −3.97 | 73.70 | 4.38 | 78.08 | 75.00 | 81.80 | 6.80 | 0.41 |
| Azerbaijan | Baku ER | 76.28 | 73.33 | 79.69 | 6.36 | −3.90 | 72.38 | 4.31 | 76.69 | 73.66 | 80.13 | 6.47 | 0.41 |
| Azerbaijan | Absheron-Khizi ER | 75.03 | 72.11 | 78.17 | 6.06 | −3.84 | 71.19 | 4.23 | 75.42 | 72.44 | 78.60 | 6.16 | 0.39 |
| Azerbaijan | Guba-Khachmaz ER | 74.80 | 71.90 | 77.90 | 6.00 | −3.82 | 70.98 | 4.22 | 75.20 | 72.22 | 78.33 | 6.11 | 0.40 |
| Azerbaijan | Mountainous Shirvan ER | 74.67 | 71.77 | 77.74 | 5.97 | −3.82 | 70.85 | 4.21 | 75.06 | 72.09 | 78.17 | 6.08 | 0.39 |
| Azerbaijan | Lankaran | 74.03 | 71.14 | 76.96 | 5.82 | −3.79 | 70.24 | 4.18 | 74.42 | 71.46 | 77.38 | 5.92 | 0.39 |
| Azerbaijan | Central Aran ER, Mil-Mughan ER, Shirvan-Salyan ER | 70.38 | 67.51 | 72.48 | 4.97 | −3.60 | 66.78 | 3.97 | 70.75 | 67.82 | 72.88 | 5.06 | 0.37 |
| Azerbaijan | Ganja-Dashkasan ER, Gazakh-Tovuz ER | 70.33 | 67.46 | 72.42 | 4.96 | −3.60 | 66.73 | 3.97 | 70.70 | 67.77 | 72.82 | 5.05 | 0.37 |
| Azerbaijan | Karabakh ER | 68.20 | 65.29 | 69.77 | 4.48 | −3.48 | 64.72 | 3.84 | 68.56 | 65.58 | 70.15 | 4.57 | 0.36 |
| Saudi Arabia | — | 77.30 | 76.07 | 78.91 | 2.84 | −0.36 | 76.94 | 0.97 | 77.91 | 76.67 | 79.53 | 2.86 | 0.61 |
| Laos | Sayabury | 75.96 | 73.65 | 79.62 | 5.97 | −0.08 | 75.88 | 1.04 | 76.92 | 74.52 | 80.67 | 6.15 | 0.96 |
| Laos | Vientiane Municipality | 73.90 | 71.71 | 77.17 | 5.46 | −0.08 | 73.82 | 1.01 | 74.83 | 72.56 | 78.19 | 5.63 | 0.93 |
| Laos | Luangprabang | 70.78 | 68.73 | 73.43 | 4.70 | −0.08 | 70.70 | 0.97 | 71.67 | 69.55 | 74.41 | 4.86 | 0.89 |
| Laos | Sekong | 70.53 | 68.49 | 73.13 | 4.64 | −0.08 | 70.45 | 0.97 | 71.42 | 69.30 | 74.10 | 4.80 | 0.89 |
| Laos | Borikhamxay | 69.74 | 67.73 | 72.18 | 4.45 | −0.07 | 69.67 | 0.96 | 70.63 | 68.53 | 73.14 | 4.61 | 0.89 |
| Laos | Huaphanh | 69.29 | 67.29 | 71.64 | 4.35 | −0.07 | 69.22 | 0.95 | 70.17 | 68.09 | 72.59 | 4.50 | 0.88 |
| Laos | Xiengkhuang | 69.24 | 67.23 | 71.57 | 4.34 | −0.08 | 69.16 | 0.95 | 70.11 | 68.03 | 72.52 | 4.49 | 0.87 |
| Laos | Luangnamtha | 68.83 | 66.83 | 71.07 | 4.24 | −0.08 | 68.75 | 0.95 | 69.70 | 67.63 | 72.02 | 4.39 | 0.87 |
| Laos | Champasack | 68.74 | 66.75 | 70.97 | 4.22 | −0.08 | 68.66 | 0.95 | 69.61 | 67.54 | 71.90 | 4.36 | 0.87 |
| Laos | Vientiane Province | 67.33 | 65.36 | 69.25 | 3.89 | −0.07 | 67.26 | 0.92 | 68.18 | 66.13 | 70.17 | 4.04 | 0.85 |
| Laos | Savannakhet | 66.36 | 64.38 | 68.05 | 3.67 | −0.08 | 66.28 | 0.91 | 67.19 | 65.15 | 68.95 | 3.80 | 0.83 |
| Laos | Bokeo | 65.97 | 63.99 | 67.57 | 3.58 | −0.08 | 65.89 | 0.91 | 66.80 | 64.75 | 68.47 | 3.72 | 0.83 |
| Laos | Attapeu | 65.95 | 63.97 | 67.54 | 3.57 | −0.08 | 65.87 | 0.91 | 66.78 | 64.73 | 68.44 | 3.71 | 0.83 |
| Laos | Khammuane | 65.06 | 63.08 | 66.45 | 3.37 | −0.07 | 64.99 | 0.90 | 65.89 | 63.83 | 67.33 | 3.50 | 0.83 |
| Laos | Saravane | 64.44 | 62.44 | 65.68 | 3.24 | −0.07 | 64.37 | 0.89 | 65.26 | 63.18 | 66.55 | 3.37 | 0.82 |
| Laos | Phongsaly | 64.35 | 62.34 | 65.56 | 3.22 | −0.08 | 64.27 | 0.89 | 65.16 | 63.08 | 66.43 | 3.35 | 0.81 |
| Laos | Oudomxay | 64.31 | 62.31 | 65.52 | 3.21 | −0.07 | 64.24 | 0.89 | 65.13 | 63.05 | 66.39 | 3.34 | 0.82 |
| Sri Lanka | — | 76.01 | 72.23 | 79.74 | 7.51 | 0.39 | 76.40 | 0.21 | 76.61 | 72.85 | 80.23 | 7.38 | 0.60 |
| Bangladesh | Jessore, Magura, Narail | 75.51 | 73.26 | 78.39 | 5.13 | −0.44 | 75.07 | 1.37 | 76.44 | 74.09 | 79.35 | 5.26 | 0.93 |
| Bangladesh | Gopalganj, Madaripur, Munshiganj, Shariatpur | 74.65 | 72.45 | 77.34 | 4.89 | −0.44 | 74.21 | 1.35 | 75.56 | 73.28 | 78.29 | 5.01 | 0.91 |
| Bangladesh | Faridpur, Manikganj, Rajbari | 74.63 | 72.44 | 77.32 | 4.88 | −0.44 | 74.19 | 1.35 | 75.54 | 73.26 | 78.26 | 5.00 | 0.91 |
| Bangladesh | Dhaka | 74.39 | 72.21 | 77.02 | 4.81 | −0.44 | 73.95 | 1.35 | 75.30 | 73.03 | 77.97 | 4.94 | 0.91 |
| Bangladesh | Naogaon, Nawabganj, Rajshahi | 73.94 | 71.79 | 76.47 | 4.68 | −0.43 | 73.51 | 1.33 | 74.84 | 72.60 | 77.41 | 4.81 | 0.90 |
| Bangladesh | Maulvibazar, Sylhet | 73.52 | 71.39 | 75.97 | 4.58 | −0.43 | 73.09 | 1.33 | 74.42 | 72.20 | 76.90 | 4.70 | 0.90 |
| Bangladesh | Brahmanbaria, Chandpur, Comilla | 73.47 | 71.34 | 75.90 | 4.56 | −0.43 | 73.04 | 1.33 | 74.37 | 72.15 | 76.83 | 4.68 | 0.90 |
| Bangladesh | Chuadanga, Jhenaidah, Kushtia, Meherpur | 73.13 | 71.02 | 75.49 | 4.47 | −0.43 | 72.70 | 1.33 | 74.03 | 71.82 | 76.41 | 4.59 | 0.90 |
| Bangladesh | Bogra, Gaibandha, Jaypurhat | 73.03 | 70.93 | 75.36 | 4.43 | −0.43 | 72.60 | 1.32 | 73.92 | 71.73 | 76.29 | 4.56 | 0.89 |
| Bangladesh | Bagerhat, Khulna, Satkhira | 72.91 | 70.81 | 75.22 | 4.41 | −0.42 | 72.49 | 1.31 | 73.80 | 71.62 | 76.14 | 4.52 | 0.89 |
| Bangladesh | Kishoreganj, Mymensingh, Netrakona | 72.87 | 70.77 | 75.16 | 4.39 | −0.43 | 72.44 | 1.32 | 73.76 | 71.57 | 76.09 | 4.52 | 0.89 |
| Bangladesh | Dinajpur, Nilphamari, Panchagarh, Thakurgaon | 72.76 | 70.67 | 75.03 | 4.36 | −0.43 | 72.33 | 1.32 | 73.65 | 71.47 | 75.95 | 4.48 | 0.89 |
| Bangladesh | Barguna, Bhola, Patuakhali | 72.61 | 70.53 | 74.85 | 4.32 | −0.42 | 72.19 | 1.31 | 73.50 | 71.33 | 75.77 | 4.44 | 0.89 |
| Bangladesh | Feni, Lakshmipur, Noakhali | 72.59 | 70.51 | 74.83 | 4.32 | −0.42 | 72.17 | 1.31 | 73.48 | 71.31 | 75.74 | 4.43 | 0.89 |
| Bangladesh | Kurigram, Lalmonirhat, Rangpur | 72.56 | 70.48 | 74.79 | 4.31 | −0.42 | 72.14 | 1.31 | 73.45 | 71.28 | 75.71 | 4.43 | 0.89 |
| Bangladesh | Jamalpur, Sherpur, Tangail | 72.41 | 70.33 | 74.60 | 4.27 | −0.43 | 71.98 | 1.31 | 73.29 | 71.13 | 75.51 | 4.38 | 0.88 |
| Bangladesh | Barisal, Jhalokati, Pirojpur | 72.39 | 70.32 | 74.58 | 4.26 | −0.42 | 71.97 | 1.31 | 73.28 | 71.11 | 75.50 | 4.39 | 0.89 |
| Bangladesh | Gazipur, Narayanganj, Narsingdi | 71.80 | 69.75 | 73.85 | 4.10 | −0.42 | 71.38 | 1.29 | 72.67 | 70.54 | 74.75 | 4.21 | 0.87 |
| Bangladesh | Khagrachhari, Rangamati | 71.72 | 69.67 | 73.75 | 4.08 | −0.42 | 71.30 | 1.30 | 72.60 | 70.46 | 74.66 | 4.20 | 0.88 |
| Bangladesh | Natore, Pabna, Sirajganj | 71.37 | 69.34 | 73.33 | 3.99 | −0.42 | 70.95 | 1.30 | 72.25 | 70.13 | 74.23 | 4.10 | 0.88 |
| Bangladesh | Bandarban, Cox s Bazar | 71.33 | 69.30 | 73.27 | 3.97 | −0.42 | 70.91 | 1.29 | 72.20 | 70.08 | 74.17 | 4.09 | 0.87 |
| Bangladesh | Chittagong | 70.73 | 68.72 | 72.53 | 3.81 | −0.41 | 70.32 | 1.28 | 71.60 | 69.50 | 73.42 | 3.92 | 0.87 |
| Bangladesh | Habiganj, Sunamganj | 70.05 | 68.06 | 71.69 | 3.63 | −0.41 | 69.64 | 1.27 | 70.91 | 68.83 | 72.57 | 3.74 | 0.86 |
| Malaysia | — | 75.76 | 73.47 | 78.31 | 4.84 | −0.88 | 74.88 | 1.38 | 76.26 | 73.96 | 78.80 | 4.84 | 0.50 |
| Vietnam | Red River Delta | 75.22 | 70.38 | 80.24 | 9.86 | −0.03 | 75.19 | 0.98 | 76.17 | 71.36 | 81.20 | 9.84 | 0.95 |
| Vietnam | North Central and South Central Coast | 75.38 | 70.53 | 80.44 | 9.91 | −0.39 | 74.99 | 0.98 | 75.97 | 71.18 | 80.96 | 9.78 | 0.59 |
| Vietnam | Mekong River Delta | 74.43 | 69.67 | 79.29 | 9.62 | −1.02 | 73.41 | 0.96 | 74.37 | 69.73 | 79.03 | 9.30 | −0.06 |
| Vietnam | Southeast | 73.95 | 69.23 | 78.71 | 9.48 | −1.13 | 72.82 | 0.95 | 73.77 | 69.20 | 78.32 | 9.12 | −0.18 |
| Vietnam | Central Highlands | 72.98 | 68.36 | 77.55 | 9.19 | −0.50 | 72.48 | 0.95 | 73.43 | 68.89 | 77.90 | 9.01 | 0.45 |
| Vietnam | Northeast, Northwest | 71.80 | 67.28 | 76.11 | 8.83 | −0.06 | 71.74 | 0.94 | 72.68 | 68.20 | 76.99 | 8.79 | 0.88 |
| Uzbekistan | Central-East (Jizzakh, Sirdaryo) | 75.66 | 73.00 | 79.03 | 6.03 | −0.51 | 75.15 | 0.86 | 76.01 | 73.27 | 79.46 | 6.19 | 0.35 |
| Uzbekistan | Tashkent Region | 74.30 | 71.69 | 77.42 | 5.73 | −0.50 | 73.80 | 0.85 | 74.65 | 71.95 | 77.85 | 5.90 | 0.35 |
| Uzbekistan | East (Namangan, Fergana, Andijan) | 72.07 | 69.50 | 74.75 | 5.25 | −0.49 | 71.58 | 0.82 | 72.40 | 69.75 | 75.17 | 5.42 | 0.33 |
| Uzbekistan | Central (Navoiy, Bukhara, Samarqand) | 70.62 | 68.06 | 73.01 | 4.95 | −0.48 | 70.14 | 0.80 | 70.94 | 68.31 | 73.41 | 5.10 | 0.32 |
| Uzbekistan | West (Karakalpakstan, Khorazm) | 70.13 | 67.57 | 72.42 | 4.85 | −0.48 | 69.65 | 0.80 | 70.45 | 67.81 | 72.82 | 5.01 | 0.32 |
| Uzbekistan | South (Qashqadaryo, Surxondaryo) | 68.45 | 65.88 | 70.38 | 4.50 | −0.46 | 67.99 | 0.78 | 68.77 | 66.11 | 70.77 | 4.66 | 0.32 |
| Iran | Mazandaran | 77.47 | 74.66 | 80.70 | 6.04 | −2.27 | 75.20 | 0.69 | 75.89 | 73.18 | 79.06 | 5.88 | −1.58 |
| Iran | Ilam | 77.35 | 74.55 | 80.56 | 6.01 | −2.26 | 75.09 | 0.69 | 75.78 | 73.08 | 78.93 | 5.85 | −1.57 |
| Iran | Gilan | 77.34 | 74.54 | 80.54 | 6.00 | −2.26 | 75.08 | 0.69 | 75.77 | 73.06 | 78.91 | 5.85 | −1.57 |
| Iran | Yazd | 77.34 | 74.53 | 80.54 | 6.01 | −2.26 | 75.08 | 0.69 | 75.77 | 73.06 | 78.91 | 5.85 | −1.57 |
| Iran | Qom | 77.06 | 74.27 | 80.20 | 5.93 | −2.26 | 74.80 | 0.69 | 75.49 | 72.81 | 78.58 | 5.77 | −1.57 |
| Iran | Chaharmahal and Bakhtiyari | 76.97 | 74.19 | 80.10 | 5.91 | −2.25 | 74.72 | 0.69 | 75.41 | 72.73 | 78.48 | 5.75 | −1.56 |
| Iran | Golestan | 76.89 | 74.12 | 80.01 | 5.89 | −2.25 | 74.64 | 0.69 | 75.33 | 72.66 | 78.39 | 5.73 | −1.56 |
| Iran | Kermanshah | 76.68 | 73.92 | 79.75 | 5.83 | −2.25 | 74.43 | 0.69 | 75.12 | 72.46 | 78.13 | 5.67 | −1.56 |
| Iran | Esfahan | 76.47 | 73.73 | 79.50 | 5.77 | −2.24 | 74.23 | 0.69 | 74.92 | 72.27 | 77.89 | 5.62 | −1.55 |
| Iran | Qazvin | 76.41 | 73.67 | 79.43 | 5.76 | −2.24 | 74.17 | 0.69 | 74.86 | 72.21 | 77.82 | 5.61 | −1.55 |
| Iran | Khuzestan | 76.39 | 73.65 | 79.40 | 5.75 | −2.24 | 74.15 | 0.68 | 74.83 | 72.19 | 77.79 | 5.60 | −1.56 |
| Iran | Tehran and Alborz | 76.38 | 73.64 | 79.39 | 5.75 | −2.24 | 74.14 | 0.68 | 74.82 | 72.18 | 77.78 | 5.60 | −1.56 |
| Iran | Semnan | 76.26 | 73.53 | 79.25 | 5.72 | −2.23 | 74.03 | 0.68 | 74.71 | 72.08 | 77.64 | 5.56 | −1.55 |
| Iran | Kerman | 76.23 | 73.50 | 79.21 | 5.71 | −2.23 | 74.00 | 0.69 | 74.69 | 72.05 | 77.61 | 5.56 | −1.54 |
| Iran | Hormozgan | 76.21 | 73.48 | 79.19 | 5.71 | −2.23 | 73.98 | 0.69 | 74.67 | 72.03 | 77.59 | 5.56 | −1.54 |
| Iran | Hamedan | 76.17 | 73.44 | 79.13 | 5.69 | −2.23 | 73.94 | 0.68 | 74.62 | 71.99 | 77.53 | 5.54 | −1.55 |
| Iran | Bushehr | 76.02 | 73.31 | 78.96 | 5.65 | −2.22 | 73.80 | 0.68 | 74.48 | 71.86 | 77.36 | 5.50 | −1.54 |
| Iran | Fars | 76.02 | 73.30 | 78.96 | 5.66 | −2.22 | 73.80 | 0.68 | 74.48 | 71.85 | 77.36 | 5.51 | −1.54 |
| Iran | Markazi | 75.95 | 73.24 | 78.87 | 5.63 | −2.22 | 73.73 | 0.68 | 74.41 | 71.79 | 77.27 | 5.48 | −1.54 |
| Iran | Lorestan | 75.94 | 73.22 | 78.86 | 5.64 | −2.22 | 73.72 | 0.68 | 74.40 | 71.78 | 77.26 | 5.48 | −1.54 |
| Iran | EastAzarbayejan | 75.93 | 73.22 | 78.85 | 5.63 | −2.22 | 73.71 | 0.68 | 74.39 | 71.77 | 77.25 | 5.48 | −1.54 |
| Iran | Zanjan | 75.90 | 73.19 | 78.81 | 5.62 | −2.22 | 73.68 | 0.68 | 74.36 | 71.75 | 77.22 | 5.47 | −1.54 |
| Iran | Kohgiluyeh and Boyerahmad | 75.76 | 73.06 | 78.65 | 5.59 | −2.21 | 73.55 | 0.67 | 74.22 | 71.62 | 77.05 | 5.43 | −1.54 |
| Iran | Khorasan-e-Razavi | 75.55 | 72.86 | 78.38 | 5.52 | −2.21 | 73.34 | 0.67 | 74.01 | 71.42 | 76.80 | 5.38 | −1.54 |
| Iran | Sistanand Baluchestan | 75.50 | 72.81 | 78.33 | 5.52 | −2.21 | 73.29 | 0.68 | 73.97 | 71.38 | 76.74 | 5.36 | −1.53 |
| Iran | WestAzarbayejan | 75.22 | 72.55 | 77.99 | 5.44 | −2.20 | 73.02 | 0.67 | 73.69 | 71.12 | 76.41 | 5.29 | −1.53 |
| Iran | North Khorasan | 75.17 | 72.50 | 77.92 | 5.42 | −2.20 | 72.97 | 0.67 | 73.64 | 71.07 | 76.34 | 5.27 | −1.53 |
| Iran | South Khorasan | 74.90 | 72.25 | 77.61 | 5.36 | −2.19 | 72.71 | 0.67 | 73.38 | 70.82 | 76.03 | 5.21 | −1.52 |
| Iran | Kordestan | 73.12 | 70.55 | 75.44 | 4.89 | −2.14 | 70.98 | 0.65 | 71.63 | 69.16 | 73.91 | 4.75 | −1.49 |
| Iran | Ardebil | 72.72 | 70.17 | 74.95 | 4.78 | −2.13 | 70.59 | 0.65 | 71.24 | 68.78 | 73.43 | 4.65 | −1.48 |
| Jordan | Aqaba | 77.18 | 74.95 | 79.86 | 4.91 | −1.81 | 75.37 | −0.04 | 75.33 | 73.15 | 78.00 | 4.85 | −1.85 |
| Jordan | Balqa | 77.06 | 74.84 | 79.71 | 4.87 | −1.81 | 75.25 | −0.04 | 75.21 | 73.04 | 77.86 | 4.82 | −1.85 |
| Jordan | Jarash | 76.74 | 74.54 | 79.33 | 4.79 | −1.80 | 74.94 | −0.05 | 74.89 | 72.75 | 77.48 | 4.73 | −1.85 |
| Jordan | Karak | 76.62 | 74.43 | 79.19 | 4.76 | −1.80 | 74.82 | −0.05 | 74.77 | 72.64 | 77.34 | 4.70 | −1.85 |
| Jordan | Amman | 76.24 | 74.08 | 78.74 | 4.66 | −1.79 | 74.45 | −0.04 | 74.41 | 72.30 | 76.91 | 4.61 | −1.83 |
| Jordan | Tafiela | 75.92 | 73.78 | 78.36 | 4.58 | −1.78 | 74.14 | −0.04 | 74.10 | 72.01 | 76.53 | 4.52 | −1.82 |
| Jordan | Maan | 75.85 | 73.72 | 78.28 | 4.56 | −1.78 | 74.07 | −0.04 | 74.03 | 71.95 | 76.45 | 4.50 | −1.82 |
| Jordan | Zarqa | 75.79 | 73.66 | 78.21 | 4.55 | −1.78 | 74.01 | −0.04 | 73.97 | 71.89 | 76.38 | 4.49 | −1.82 |
| Jordan | Irbid | 75.79 | 73.65 | 78.20 | 4.55 | −1.79 | 74.00 | −0.04 | 73.96 | 71.89 | 76.38 | 4.49 | −1.83 |
| Jordan | Madaba | 75.35 | 73.25 | 77.68 | 4.43 | −1.77 | 73.58 | −0.04 | 73.54 | 71.49 | 75.87 | 4.38 | −1.81 |
| Jordan | Ajloun | 75.24 | 73.14 | 77.55 | 4.41 | −1.77 | 73.47 | −0.04 | 73.43 | 71.39 | 75.74 | 4.35 | −1.81 |
| Jordan | Mafraq | 75.01 | 72.93 | 77.27 | 4.34 | −1.76 | 73.25 | −0.04 | 73.21 | 71.18 | 75.47 | 4.29 | −1.80 |
| Tajikistan | Dushanbe | 74.78 | 72.59 | 77.58 | 4.99 | 0.76 | 75.54 | −0.32 | 75.22 | 72.94 | 78.12 | 5.18 | 0.44 |
| Tajikistan | Gorno-Badakhshan | 71.50 | 69.48 | 73.76 | 4.28 | 0.74 | 72.24 | −0.31 | 71.93 | 69.81 | 74.27 | 4.46 | 0.43 |
| Tajikistan | Districts under Central Government Jurisdiction | 71.50 | 69.47 | 73.75 | 4.28 | 0.73 | 72.23 | −0.31 | 71.92 | 69.80 | 74.26 | 4.46 | 0.42 |
| Tajikistan | Sughd Region | 70.93 | 68.92 | 73.08 | 4.16 | 0.73 | 71.66 | −0.31 | 71.35 | 69.25 | 73.59 | 4.34 | 0.42 |
| Tajikistan | Khatlon Region | 69.74 | 67.77 | 71.68 | 3.91 | 0.72 | 70.46 | −0.31 | 70.15 | 68.09 | 72.18 | 4.09 | 0.41 |
| Brunei | — | 74.75 | 72.71 | 76.99 | 4.28 | −0.11 | 74.64 | −0.09 | 74.55 | 72.51 | 76.79 | 4.28 | −0.20 |
| Lebanon | — | 79.24 | 77.25 | 81.04 | 3.79 | −4.19 | 75.05 | −0.63 | 74.42 | 72.24 | 76.60 | 4.36 | −4.82 |
| Philippines | Metro Manila (National Capital Region) | 74.48 | 72.46 | 76.80 | 4.34 | −2.99 | 71.49 | 2.86 | 74.35 | 72.25 | 76.71 | 4.46 | −0.13 |
| Philippines | II – Cagayan Valley | 73.06 | 71.11 | 75.14 | 4.03 | −2.12 | 70.94 | 3.26 | 74.20 | 72.11 | 76.53 | 4.42 | 1.14 |
| Philippines | Cordillera Administrative Region | 74.21 | 72.20 | 76.49 | 4.29 | −3.14 | 71.07 | 2.76 | 73.83 | 71.76 | 76.10 | 4.34 | −0.38 |
| Philippines | XI – Davao | 72.88 | 70.95 | 74.93 | 3.98 | −2.24 | 70.64 | 3.18 | 73.82 | 71.75 | 76.09 | 4.34 | 0.94 |
| Philippines | XIII – Caraga | 72.43 | 70.52 | 74.40 | 3.88 | −2.09 | 70.34 | 3.24 | 73.58 | 71.53 | 75.81 | 4.28 | 1.15 |
| Philippines | X – Northern Mindanao | 71.77 | 69.90 | 73.63 | 3.73 | −2.10 | 69.67 | 3.18 | 72.85 | 70.85 | 74.96 | 4.11 | 1.08 |
| Philippines | VI – Western Visayas | 70.23 | 68.41 | 71.80 | 3.39 | −1.31 | 68.92 | 3.55 | 72.47 | 70.49 | 74.51 | 4.02 | 2.24 |
| Philippines | III – Central Luzon | 72.77 | 70.84 | 74.80 | 3.96 | −3.21 | 69.56 | 2.64 | 72.20 | 70.23 | 74.19 | 3.96 | −0.57 |
| Philippines | V – Bicol | 70.76 | 68.93 | 72.44 | 3.51 | −2.13 | 68.63 | 3.12 | 71.75 | 69.80 | 73.66 | 3.86 | 0.99 |
| Philippines | IV-A – Calabarzon | 72.33 | 70.43 | 74.29 | 3.86 | −3.21 | 69.12 | 2.60 | 71.72 | 69.78 | 73.62 | 3.84 | −0.61 |
| Philippines | VII – Central Visayas | 71.49 | 69.62 | 73.30 | 3.68 | −2.72 | 68.77 | 2.83 | 71.60 | 69.66 | 73.48 | 3.82 | 0.11 |
| Philippines | IV-B – Mimaropa | 71.16 | 69.31 | 72.91 | 3.60 | −2.53 | 68.63 | 2.91 | 71.54 | 69.61 | 73.42 | 3.81 | 0.38 |
| Philippines | VIII – Eastern Visayas | 71.22 | 69.37 | 72.98 | 3.61 | −2.62 | 68.60 | 2.88 | 71.48 | 69.55 | 73.34 | 3.79 | 0.26 |
| Philippines | Autonomous Region in Muslim Mindanao | 68.97 | 67.19 | 70.31 | 3.12 | −1.18 | 67.79 | 3.54 | 71.33 | 69.41 | 73.17 | 3.76 | 2.36 |
| Philippines | XII – Soccsksargen | 69.57 | 67.78 | 71.03 | 3.25 | −1.73 | 67.84 | 3.27 | 71.11 | 69.20 | 72.91 | 3.71 | 1.54 |
| Philippines | IX – Zamboanga Peninsula | 71.34 | 69.49 | 73.12 | 3.63 | −3.39 | 67.95 | 2.44 | 70.39 | 68.51 | 72.06 | 3.55 | −0.95 |
| Philippines | I – Ilocos | 70.68 | 68.85 | 72.34 | 3.49 | −3.50 | 67.18 | 2.35 | 69.53 | 67.69 | 71.04 | 3.35 | −1.15 |
| Mongolia | Central (Dornogovi, Dundgovi, Umnugovi, Selenge, Tuv, Darkhan-Uul, Govisumber) | 73.39 | 68.69 | 78.53 | 9.84 | −0.86 | 72.53 | 1.73 | 74.26 | 69.53 | 79.28 | 9.75 | 0.87 |
| Mongolia | Ulaanbaatar | 72.78 | 68.13 | 77.80 | 9.67 | −0.85 | 71.93 | 1.71 | 73.64 | 68.97 | 78.54 | 9.57 | 0.86 |
| Mongolia | Eastern (Dornod, Sukhbaatar, Khentii) | 72.40 | 67.78 | 77.34 | 9.56 | −0.86 | 71.54 | 1.71 | 73.25 | 68.61 | 78.07 | 9.46 | 0.85 |
| Mongolia | Western (Bayan-Ulgii, Govi-Altai, Zavkhan, Uvs, Khovd) | 70.25 | 65.81 | 74.75 | 8.94 | −0.83 | 69.42 | 1.66 | 71.08 | 66.62 | 75.46 | 8.84 | 0.83 |
| Mongolia | Khangai (Arkhangai, Bayankhongor, Bulgan, Uvurkhangai, Khuvsgul, Orkhon) | 69.20 | 64.84 | 73.48 | 8.64 | −0.81 | 68.39 | 1.63 | 70.02 | 65.63 | 74.18 | 8.55 | 0.82 |
| Syria | Der El Zour - Deir Ezzor | 73.54 | 69.80 | 77.71 | 7.91 | 0.25 | 73.79 | 0.24 | 74.03 | 70.26 | 78.21 | 7.95 | 0.49 |
| Syria | Tartous | 73.24 | 69.52 | 77.35 | 7.83 | 0.24 | 73.48 | 0.25 | 73.73 | 69.98 | 77.84 | 7.86 | 0.49 |
| Syria | Raqqa | 72.84 | 69.16 | 76.87 | 7.71 | 0.25 | 73.09 | 0.24 | 73.33 | 69.62 | 77.36 | 7.74 | 0.49 |
| Syria | Al Swida - Sweida | 72.38 | 68.74 | 76.31 | 7.57 | 0.24 | 72.62 | 0.24 | 72.86 | 69.19 | 76.79 | 7.60 | 0.48 |
| Syria | Homs | 72.26 | 68.62 | 76.16 | 7.54 | 0.24 | 72.50 | 0.24 | 72.74 | 69.07 | 76.65 | 7.58 | 0.48 |
| Syria | Hamaa | 71.80 | 68.20 | 75.61 | 7.41 | 0.24 | 72.04 | 0.24 | 72.28 | 68.65 | 76.09 | 7.44 | 0.48 |
| Syria | Rural Damascus | 71.62 | 68.04 | 75.39 | 7.35 | 0.24 | 71.86 | 0.24 | 72.10 | 68.48 | 75.87 | 7.39 | 0.48 |
| Syria | Halab - Aleppo | 71.37 | 67.81 | 75.09 | 7.28 | 0.24 | 71.61 | 0.23 | 71.84 | 68.25 | 75.57 | 7.32 | 0.47 |
| Syria | Al Hasaka | 71.05 | 67.51 | 74.70 | 7.19 | 0.24 | 71.29 | 0.23 | 71.52 | 67.95 | 75.17 | 7.22 | 0.47 |
| Syria | Al Latakia | 70.95 | 67.42 | 74.58 | 7.16 | 0.24 | 71.19 | 0.23 | 71.42 | 67.86 | 75.05 | 7.19 | 0.47 |
| Syria | Daraa | 70.90 | 67.37 | 74.52 | 7.15 | 0.24 | 71.14 | 0.23 | 71.37 | 67.81 | 74.99 | 7.18 | 0.47 |
| Syria | Al Qunitara - Quneitra | 69.48 | 65.23 | 75.16 | 9.93 | 0.47 | 69.95 | 0.46 | 70.41 | 66.09 | 76.11 | 10.02 | 0.93 |
| Syria | Damascus | 69.48 | 65.23 | 75.16 | 9.93 | 0.47 | 69.95 | 0.46 | 70.41 | 66.09 | 76.11 | 10.02 | 0.93 |
| Syria | Idlib | 69.89 | 66.43 | 73.29 | 6.86 | 0.24 | 70.13 | 0.23 | 70.36 | 66.87 | 73.76 | 6.89 | 0.47 |
| Oman | — | 78.00 | 76.54 | 79.95 | 3.41 | −5.46 | 72.54 | 1.40 | 73.94 | 72.36 | 76.05 | 3.69 | −4.06 |
| Palestine | Tulkarm | 75.28 | 72.92 | 77.72 | 4.80 | −0.88 | 74.40 | −0.93 | 73.47 | 71.09 | 75.94 | 4.85 | −1.81 |
| Palestine | Jericho and Al Aghwar | 75.14 | 72.83 | 77.49 | 4.66 | −0.74 | 74.40 | −0.93 | 73.47 | 71.09 | 75.94 | 4.85 | −1.67 |
| Palestine | Jerusalem | 75.07 | 72.72 | 77.47 | 4.75 | −0.67 | 74.40 | −0.93 | 73.47 | 71.09 | 75.94 | 4.85 | −1.60 |
| Palestine | Bethlehem | 75.03 | 72.68 | 77.42 | 4.74 | −0.63 | 74.40 | −0.93 | 73.47 | 71.09 | 75.94 | 4.85 | −1.56 |
| Palestine | Tubas | 75.02 | 72.68 | 77.41 | 4.73 | −0.62 | 74.40 | −0.93 | 73.47 | 71.09 | 75.94 | 4.85 | −1.55 |
| Palestine | Deir al-Balah | 74.95 | 72.61 | 77.32 | 4.71 | −0.55 | 74.40 | −0.93 | 73.47 | 71.09 | 75.94 | 4.85 | −1.48 |
| Palestine | Khan Yunis | 74.91 | 72.58 | 77.28 | 4.70 | −0.51 | 74.40 | −0.93 | 73.47 | 71.09 | 75.94 | 4.85 | −1.44 |
| Palestine | Jenin | 74.89 | 72.56 | 77.26 | 4.70 | −0.49 | 74.40 | −0.93 | 73.47 | 71.09 | 75.94 | 4.85 | −1.42 |
| Palestine | Ramallah & Al-Bireh | 74.83 | 72.50 | 77.19 | 4.69 | −0.43 | 74.40 | −0.93 | 73.47 | 71.09 | 75.94 | 4.85 | −1.36 |
| Palestine | Nablus | 74.80 | 72.47 | 77.14 | 4.67 | −0.40 | 74.40 | −0.93 | 73.47 | 71.09 | 75.94 | 4.85 | −1.33 |
| Palestine | Rafah | 74.73 | 72.40 | 77.06 | 4.66 | −0.33 | 74.40 | −0.93 | 73.47 | 71.09 | 75.94 | 4.85 | −1.26 |
| Palestine | Hebron | 74.65 | 72.33 | 76.96 | 4.63 | −0.25 | 74.40 | −0.93 | 73.47 | 71.09 | 75.94 | 4.85 | −1.18 |
| Palestine | Salfit | 74.60 | 72.28 | 76.90 | 4.62 | −0.20 | 74.40 | −0.93 | 73.47 | 71.09 | 75.94 | 4.85 | −1.13 |
| Palestine | Gaza City | 74.59 | 72.27 | 76.89 | 4.62 | −0.19 | 74.40 | −0.93 | 73.47 | 71.09 | 75.94 | 4.85 | −1.12 |
| Palestine | North Gaza | 74.57 | 72.26 | 76.87 | 4.61 | −0.17 | 74.40 | −0.93 | 73.47 | 71.09 | 75.94 | 4.85 | −1.10 |
| Palestine | Qalqiliya | 74.54 | 72.23 | 76.84 | 4.61 | −0.14 | 74.40 | −0.93 | 73.47 | 71.09 | 75.94 | 4.85 | −1.07 |
| India | Kerala | 76.86 | 75.11 | 79.51 | 4.40 | −3.98 | 72.88 | 0.55 | 73.43 | 71.58 | 76.20 | 4.62 | −3.43 |
| India | Puducherry | 76.41 | 74.69 | 78.98 | 4.29 | −3.96 | 72.45 | 0.55 | 73.00 | 71.18 | 75.69 | 4.51 | −3.41 |
| India | Goa | 75.90 | 74.22 | 78.37 | 4.15 | −3.93 | 71.97 | 0.54 | 72.51 | 70.73 | 75.11 | 4.38 | −3.39 |
| India | Jammu and Kashmir | 75.10 | 73.48 | 77.42 | 3.94 | −3.89 | 71.21 | 0.54 | 71.75 | 70.03 | 74.20 | 4.17 | −3.35 |
| India | Arunachal Pradesh | 74.99 | 73.38 | 77.29 | 3.91 | −3.88 | 71.11 | 0.54 | 71.65 | 69.93 | 74.08 | 4.15 | −3.34 |
| India | Andaman and Nicobar Islands | 74.59 | 73.00 | 76.81 | 3.81 | −3.86 | 70.73 | 0.53 | 71.26 | 69.57 | 73.62 | 4.05 | −3.33 |
| India | Daman and Diu | 74.57 | 72.99 | 76.79 | 3.80 | −3.86 | 70.71 | 0.53 | 71.24 | 69.56 | 73.60 | 4.04 | −3.33 |
| India | Sikkim | 74.42 | 72.84 | 76.61 | 3.77 | −3.85 | 70.57 | 0.53 | 71.10 | 69.42 | 73.42 | 4.00 | −3.32 |
| India | Tamil Nadu | 73.84 | 72.30 | 75.92 | 3.62 | −3.82 | 70.02 | 0.52 | 70.54 | 68.90 | 72.76 | 3.86 | −3.30 |
| India | Chandigarh | 73.56 | 72.04 | 75.58 | 3.54 | −3.81 | 69.75 | 0.52 | 70.27 | 68.65 | 72.44 | 3.79 | −3.29 |
| India | Maharashtra | 73.40 | 71.89 | 75.39 | 3.50 | −3.80 | 69.60 | 0.52 | 70.12 | 68.51 | 72.26 | 3.75 | −3.28 |
| India | Manipur | 73.23 | 71.73 | 75.19 | 3.46 | −3.79 | 69.44 | 0.52 | 69.96 | 68.36 | 72.06 | 3.70 | −3.27 |
| India | Karnataka | 73.14 | 71.64 | 75.08 | 3.44 | −3.78 | 69.36 | 0.52 | 69.88 | 68.28 | 71.96 | 3.68 | −3.26 |
| India | Lakshadweep | 73.15 | 71.53 | 75.28 | 3.75 | −3.79 | 69.36 | 0.52 | 69.88 | 68.17 | 72.15 | 3.98 | −3.27 |
| India | Mizoram | 73.08 | 71.59 | 75.01 | 3.42 | −3.78 | 69.30 | 0.52 | 69.82 | 68.23 | 71.89 | 3.66 | −3.26 |
| India | Nagaland | 73.01 | 71.52 | 74.92 | 3.40 | −3.78 | 69.23 | 0.52 | 69.75 | 68.16 | 71.81 | 3.65 | −3.26 |
| India | Himachal Pradesh | 72.99 | 71.50 | 74.89 | 3.39 | −3.78 | 69.21 | 0.52 | 69.73 | 68.14 | 71.78 | 3.64 | −3.26 |
| India | West Bengal | 72.96 | 71.47 | 74.87 | 3.40 | −3.77 | 69.19 | 0.51 | 69.70 | 68.12 | 71.75 | 3.63 | −3.26 |
| India | New Delhi | 72.65 | 71.18 | 74.49 | 3.31 | −3.76 | 68.89 | 0.51 | 69.40 | 67.83 | 71.39 | 3.56 | −3.25 |
| India | Telangana | 72.55 | 71.08 | 74.37 | 3.29 | −3.76 | 68.79 | 0.52 | 69.31 | 67.74 | 71.28 | 3.54 | −3.24 |
| India | Dadra and Nagar Haveli | 72.01 | 70.58 | 73.73 | 3.15 | −3.72 | 68.29 | 0.51 | 68.80 | 67.26 | 70.66 | 3.40 | −3.21 |
| India | Punjab | 71.81 | 70.38 | 73.48 | 3.10 | −3.72 | 68.09 | 0.51 | 68.60 | 67.07 | 70.42 | 3.35 | −3.21 |
| India | Gujarat | 71.64 | 70.22 | 73.27 | 3.05 | −3.71 | 67.93 | 0.51 | 68.44 | 66.92 | 70.23 | 3.31 | −3.20 |
| India | Assam | 71.62 | 70.20 | 73.25 | 3.05 | −3.71 | 67.91 | 0.51 | 68.42 | 66.90 | 70.20 | 3.30 | −3.20 |
| India | Meghalaya | 71.53 | 70.12 | 73.15 | 3.03 | −3.70 | 67.83 | 0.51 | 68.34 | 66.82 | 70.10 | 3.28 | −3.19 |
| India | Andhra Pradesh | 71.38 | 69.97 | 72.96 | 2.99 | −3.69 | 67.69 | 0.50 | 68.19 | 66.68 | 69.93 | 3.25 | −3.19 |
| India | Rajasthan | 71.28 | 69.88 | 72.85 | 2.97 | −3.68 | 67.60 | 0.50 | 68.10 | 66.60 | 69.82 | 3.22 | −3.18 |
| India | Haryana | 71.21 | 69.81 | 72.76 | 2.95 | −3.68 | 67.53 | 0.50 | 68.03 | 66.53 | 69.73 | 3.20 | −3.18 |
| India | Uttarakhand | 70.89 | 69.50 | 72.37 | 2.87 | −3.67 | 67.22 | 0.50 | 67.72 | 66.24 | 69.36 | 3.12 | −3.17 |
| India | Odisha | 70.70 | 69.32 | 72.14 | 2.82 | −3.66 | 67.04 | 0.50 | 67.54 | 66.06 | 69.14 | 3.08 | −3.16 |
| India | Chhattisgarh | 70.27 | 68.91 | 71.62 | 2.71 | −3.64 | 66.63 | 0.50 | 67.13 | 65.67 | 68.64 | 2.97 | −3.14 |
| India | Tripura | 70.07 | 68.72 | 71.38 | 2.66 | −3.63 | 66.44 | 0.50 | 66.94 | 65.49 | 68.41 | 2.92 | −3.13 |
| India | Jharkhand | 69.96 | 68.62 | 71.25 | 2.63 | −3.62 | 66.34 | 0.50 | 66.84 | 65.39 | 68.28 | 2.89 | −3.12 |
| India | Madhya Pradesh | 69.57 | 68.24 | 70.77 | 2.53 | −3.60 | 65.97 | 0.49 | 66.46 | 65.03 | 67.83 | 2.80 | −3.11 |
| India | Bihar | 68.72 | 67.41 | 69.73 | 2.32 | −3.56 | 65.16 | 0.49 | 65.65 | 64.24 | 66.83 | 2.59 | −3.07 |
| India | Uttar Pradesh | 68.52 | 67.21 | 69.49 | 2.28 | −3.55 | 64.97 | 0.49 | 65.46 | 64.05 | 66.60 | 2.55 | −3.06 |
| Armenia | — | 75.44 | 70.40 | 79.86 | 9.46 | −3.40 | 72.04 | 1.33 | 73.37 | 67.87 | 78.45 | 10.58 | −2.07 |
| Russia | Northwestern FD | 77.11 | — | — | — | −4.75 | 72.36 | 0.70 | 73.06 | — | — | — | −4.05 |
| Russia | Central FD | 75.15 | — | — | — | −4.59 | 70.56 | 0.71 | 71.27 | — | — | — | −3.88 |
| Russia | North Caucasian FD | 74.23 | — | — | — | −4.51 | 69.72 | 0.70 | 70.42 | — | — | — | −3.81 |
| Russia | Southern FD ** | 74.18 | — | — | — | −4.73 | 69.45 | 0.59 | 70.04 | — | — | — | −4.14 |
| Russia | Ural FD | 73.27 | — | — | — | −4.26 | 69.01 | 0.80 | 69.81 | — | — | — | −3.46 |
| Russia | Volga FD | 73.51 | — | — | — | −4.44 | 69.07 | 0.72 | 69.79 | — | — | — | −3.72 |
| Russia | Siberian FD | 71.65 | — | — | — | −4.40 | 67.25 | 0.66 | 67.91 | — | — | — | −3.74 |
| Russia | Far Eastern FD | 71.04 | — | — | — | −4.56 | 66.48 | 0.56 | 67.04 | — | — | — | −4.00 |
| Pakistan | FATA | 73.32 | 70.90 | 77.33 | 6.43 | −0.73 | 72.59 | 0.37 | 72.96 | 70.39 | 77.13 | 6.74 | −0.36 |
| Pakistan | Islamabad (ICT) | 70.83 | 68.55 | 74.25 | 5.70 | −0.69 | 70.14 | 0.35 | 70.49 | 68.07 | 74.06 | 5.99 | −0.34 |
| Pakistan | Khyber Pakhtunkhwa (NWFrontier) | 68.62 | 66.43 | 71.47 | 5.04 | −0.67 | 67.95 | 0.34 | 68.29 | 65.95 | 71.28 | 5.33 | −0.33 |
| Pakistan | Sindh | 66.88 | 64.71 | 69.25 | 4.54 | −0.66 | 66.22 | 0.33 | 66.55 | 64.25 | 69.07 | 4.82 | −0.33 |
| Pakistan | Balochistan | 66.65 | 64.49 | 68.96 | 4.47 | −0.66 | 65.99 | 0.33 | 66.32 | 64.03 | 68.78 | 4.75 | −0.33 |
| Pakistan | AJK | 66.36 | 63.70 | 71.59 | 7.89 | −1.30 | 65.06 | 0.66 | 65.72 | 62.79 | 71.22 | 8.43 | −0.64 |
| Pakistan | Punjab | 65.83 | 63.67 | 67.91 | 4.24 | −0.65 | 65.18 | 0.33 | 65.51 | 63.22 | 67.74 | 4.52 | −0.32 |
| Pakistan | Gilgit Baltistan | 64.92 | 62.55 | 67.15 | 4.60 | −0.64 | 64.28 | 0.32 | 64.60 | 62.10 | 66.98 | 4.88 | −0.32 |
| Nepal | Gandaki province | 70.20 | 68.36 | 72.12 | 3.76 | −0.08 | 70.12 | 2.62 | 72.74 | 70.72 | 75.09 | 4.37 | 2.54 |
| Nepal | Bagmati province | 70.85 | 68.96 | 72.90 | 3.94 | −0.62 | 70.23 | 2.35 | 72.58 | 70.58 | 74.90 | 4.32 | 1.73 |
| Nepal | Koshi province | 69.84 | 68.02 | 71.69 | 3.67 | −0.91 | 68.93 | 2.15 | 71.08 | 69.17 | 73.08 | 3.91 | 1.24 |
| Nepal | Lumbini province | 67.51 | 65.81 | 68.88 | 3.07 | −0.12 | 67.39 | 2.50 | 69.89 | 68.05 | 71.65 | 3.60 | 2.38 |
| Nepal | Madhesh province | 70.02 | 68.18 | 71.90 | 3.72 | −1.98 | 68.04 | 1.57 | 69.61 | 67.78 | 71.31 | 3.53 | −0.41 |
| Nepal | Karnali province | 68.63 | 66.88 | 70.23 | 3.35 | −1.31 | 67.32 | 1.89 | 69.21 | 67.40 | 70.82 | 3.42 | 0.58 |
| Nepal | Sudurpashchim province | 69.14 | 67.36 | 70.85 | 3.49 | −1.92 | 67.22 | 1.57 | 68.79 | 67.00 | 70.30 | 3.30 | −0.35 |
| Iraq | Babylon | 72.98 | 70.87 | 75.10 | 4.23 | −1.22 | 71.76 | 0.97 | 72.73 | 70.47 | 75.03 | 4.56 | −0.25 |
| Iraq | Dohouk | 72.78 | 70.69 | 74.86 | 4.17 | −1.22 | 71.56 | 0.98 | 72.54 | 70.28 | 74.80 | 4.52 | −0.24 |
| Iraq | Thi-Qar | 72.39 | 70.33 | 74.40 | 4.07 | −1.21 | 71.18 | 0.97 | 72.15 | 69.93 | 74.34 | 4.41 | −0.24 |
| Iraq | Baghdad | 72.35 | 70.28 | 74.35 | 4.07 | −1.21 | 71.14 | 0.97 | 72.11 | 69.88 | 74.28 | 4.40 | −0.24 |
| Iraq | Suleimaniya | 72.25 | 70.19 | 74.23 | 4.04 | −1.21 | 71.04 | 0.97 | 72.01 | 69.79 | 74.16 | 4.37 | −0.24 |
| Iraq | Muthanna | 72.24 | 70.18 | 74.22 | 4.04 | −1.21 | 71.03 | 0.97 | 72.00 | 69.78 | 74.15 | 4.37 | −0.24 |
| Iraq | Erbil | 72.21 | 70.16 | 74.19 | 4.03 | −1.21 | 71.00 | 0.97 | 71.97 | 69.76 | 74.12 | 4.36 | −0.24 |
| Iraq | Anbar | 72.03 | 69.98 | 73.97 | 3.99 | −1.21 | 70.82 | 0.97 | 71.79 | 69.58 | 73.90 | 4.32 | −0.24 |
| Iraq | Najaf | 71.66 | 69.64 | 73.53 | 3.89 | −1.20 | 70.46 | 0.96 | 71.42 | 69.24 | 73.47 | 4.23 | −0.24 |
| Iraq | Nenava | 71.64 | 69.62 | 73.50 | 3.88 | −1.20 | 70.44 | 0.96 | 71.40 | 69.22 | 73.44 | 4.22 | −0.24 |
| Iraq | Qadisiya | 71.19 | 69.19 | 72.96 | 3.77 | −1.20 | 69.99 | 0.96 | 70.95 | 68.80 | 72.90 | 4.10 | −0.24 |
| Iraq | Maysan | 71.14 | 69.15 | 72.90 | 3.75 | −1.19 | 69.95 | 0.95 | 70.90 | 68.75 | 72.84 | 4.09 | −0.24 |
| Iraq | Salaheldeen | 71.08 | 69.09 | 72.83 | 3.74 | −1.19 | 69.89 | 0.95 | 70.84 | 68.70 | 72.77 | 4.07 | −0.24 |
| Iraq | Diyala | 70.82 | 68.85 | 72.53 | 3.68 | −1.18 | 69.64 | 0.95 | 70.59 | 68.46 | 72.46 | 4.00 | −0.23 |
| Iraq | Karkuk | 70.16 | 68.22 | 71.73 | 3.51 | −1.18 | 68.98 | 0.94 | 69.92 | 67.83 | 71.67 | 3.84 | −0.24 |
| Iraq | Wasit | 69.90 | 67.97 | 71.42 | 3.45 | −1.17 | 68.73 | 0.93 | 69.66 | 67.58 | 71.35 | 3.77 | −0.24 |
| Iraq | Basra | 69.49 | 67.58 | 70.92 | 3.34 | −1.17 | 68.32 | 0.93 | 69.25 | 67.19 | 70.86 | 3.67 | −0.24 |
| Iraq | Kerbela | 69.31 | 67.41 | 70.71 | 3.30 | −1.16 | 68.15 | 0.93 | 69.08 | 67.03 | 70.65 | 3.62 | −0.23 |
| Georgia | Shida Kartli *** | 74.62 | 69.53 | 79.83 | 10.30 | −1.80 | 72.82 | −0.11 | 72.71 | 67.77 | 77.82 | 10.05 | −1.91 |
| Georgia | Kvemo Kartli | 74.33 | 69.27 | 79.47 | 10.20 | −1.80 | 72.53 | −0.11 | 72.42 | 67.52 | 77.48 | 9.96 | −1.91 |
| Georgia | Imereti, Racha-Lechkhumi and Kvemo Svaneti *** | 74.28 | 69.22 | 79.41 | 10.19 | −1.80 | 72.48 | −0.11 | 72.37 | 67.47 | 77.42 | 9.95 | −1.91 |
| Georgia | Samtskhe–Javakheti | 74.12 | 69.08 | 79.22 | 10.14 | −1.79 | 72.33 | −0.11 | 72.22 | 67.33 | 77.23 | 9.90 | −1.90 |
| Georgia | Adjara | 72.78 | 67.86 | 77.59 | 9.73 | −1.76 | 71.02 | −0.11 | 70.91 | 66.15 | 75.64 | 9.49 | −1.87 |
| Georgia | Guria | 72.52 | 67.63 | 77.27 | 9.64 | −1.75 | 70.77 | −0.11 | 70.66 | 65.92 | 75.33 | 9.41 | −1.86 |
| Georgia | Samegrelo-Zemo Svaneti | 72.46 | 67.57 | 77.20 | 9.63 | −1.75 | 70.71 | −0.11 | 70.60 | 65.86 | 75.26 | 9.40 | −1.86 |
| Georgia | Tbilisi | 71.78 | 66.46 | 77.24 | 10.78 | −1.73 | 70.05 | −0.11 | 69.94 | 64.78 | 75.30 | 10.52 | −1.84 |
| Georgia | Kakheti | 71.10 | 66.33 | 75.54 | 9.21 | −1.71 | 69.39 | −0.11 | 69.28 | 64.66 | 73.65 | 8.99 | −1.82 |
| Georgia | Mtskheta-Mtianeti *** | 65.53 | 60.64 | 69.52 | 8.88 | −1.58 | 63.95 | −0.10 | 63.85 | 59.11 | 67.77 | 8.66 | −1.68 |
| Timor-Leste | Liquica | 71.64 | 69.95 | 73.92 | 3.97 | −0.56 | 71.08 | 1.38 | 72.46 | 70.70 | 74.84 | 4.14 | 0.82 |
| Timor-Leste | Cova Lima | 70.01 | 68.40 | 72.01 | 3.61 | −0.54 | 69.47 | 1.35 | 70.82 | 69.13 | 72.90 | 3.77 | 0.81 |
| Timor-Leste | Lautem | 69.44 | 67.85 | 71.34 | 3.49 | −0.54 | 68.90 | 1.34 | 70.24 | 68.58 | 72.22 | 3.64 | 0.80 |
| Timor-Leste | Aileu | 69.36 | 67.78 | 71.24 | 3.46 | −0.54 | 68.82 | 1.34 | 70.16 | 68.50 | 72.12 | 3.62 | 0.80 |
| Timor-Leste | Ermera | 69.35 | 67.76 | 71.23 | 3.47 | −0.54 | 68.81 | 1.34 | 70.15 | 68.49 | 72.11 | 3.62 | 0.80 |
| Timor-Leste | Bobonaro | 68.98 | 67.41 | 70.79 | 3.38 | −0.54 | 68.44 | 1.33 | 69.77 | 68.13 | 71.67 | 3.54 | 0.79 |
| Timor-Leste | Dili | 68.85 | 67.28 | 70.64 | 3.36 | −0.54 | 68.31 | 1.33 | 69.64 | 68.00 | 71.51 | 3.51 | 0.79 |
| Timor-Leste | Manatuto | 68.33 | 66.78 | 70.02 | 3.24 | −0.53 | 67.80 | 1.32 | 69.12 | 67.50 | 70.89 | 3.39 | 0.79 |
| Timor-Leste | Baucau | 67.93 | 66.40 | 69.55 | 3.15 | −0.52 | 67.41 | 1.31 | 68.72 | 67.11 | 70.41 | 3.30 | 0.79 |
| Timor-Leste | Manufahi | 67.93 | 66.39 | 69.54 | 3.15 | −0.53 | 67.40 | 1.31 | 68.71 | 67.10 | 70.40 | 3.30 | 0.78 |
| Timor-Leste | Viqueque | 67.05 | 65.53 | 68.50 | 2.97 | −0.52 | 66.53 | 1.29 | 67.82 | 66.23 | 69.34 | 3.11 | 0.77 |
| Timor-Leste | Ainaro | 65.91 | 64.41 | 67.14 | 2.73 | −0.51 | 65.40 | 1.27 | 66.67 | 65.10 | 67.97 | 2.87 | 0.76 |
| Timor-Leste | Oecussi | 63.19 | 61.68 | 63.84 | 2.16 | −0.49 | 62.70 | 1.22 | 63.92 | 62.34 | 64.63 | 2.29 | 0.73 |
| Cambodia | Phnom Penh | 73.51 | 71.05 | 76.20 | 5.15 | −1.60 | 71.91 | 0.32 | 72.23 | 69.27 | 75.38 | 6.11 | −1.28 |
| Cambodia | Kampong Thum | 71.31 | 68.96 | 73.58 | 4.62 | −0.20 | 71.11 | 0.32 | 71.43 | 68.54 | 74.43 | 5.89 | 0.12 |
| Cambodia | Kandal | 71.88 | 69.53 | 74.28 | 4.75 | −1.13 | 70.75 | 0.31 | 71.06 | 68.20 | 74.00 | 5.80 | −0.82 |
| Cambodia | Siem Reab-Otdar Mean Chey | 71.22 | 68.88 | 73.49 | 4.61 | −0.61 | 70.61 | 0.31 | 70.92 | 68.07 | 73.84 | 5.77 | −0.30 |
| Cambodia | Takaev | 72.07 | 69.71 | 74.50 | 4.79 | −1.60 | 70.47 | 0.32 | 70.79 | 67.94 | 73.68 | 5.74 | −1.28 |
| Cambodia | Kaoh Kong | 71.04 | 68.72 | 73.28 | 4.56 | −0.88 | 70.16 | 0.31 | 70.47 | 67.65 | 73.30 | 5.65 | −0.57 |
| Cambodia | Banteay Mean Chey | 71.59 | 69.26 | 73.95 | 4.69 | −1.73 | 69.86 | 0.31 | 70.17 | 67.38 | 72.95 | 5.57 | −1.42 |
| Cambodia | Pousat | 71.31 | 68.99 | 73.61 | 4.62 | −1.61 | 69.70 | 0.31 | 70.01 | 67.23 | 72.76 | 5.53 | −1.30 |
| Cambodia | Kampong Spueu | 71.40 | 69.08 | 73.71 | 4.63 | −1.88 | 69.52 | 0.31 | 69.83 | 67.05 | 72.54 | 5.49 | −1.57 |
| Cambodia | Preah Vihear-Stueng Traeng-Kracheh | 69.04 | 66.79 | 70.88 | 4.09 | −0.02 | 69.02 | 0.31 | 69.33 | 66.58 | 71.95 | 5.37 | 0.29 |
| Cambodia | Kampong Cham (inc. Tboung Khmum) | 70.13 | 67.87 | 72.22 | 4.35 | −1.30 | 68.83 | 0.31 | 69.14 | 66.41 | 71.72 | 5.31 | −0.99 |
| Cambodia | Prey Veaeng | 68.82 | 66.59 | 70.64 | 4.05 | −0.29 | 68.53 | 0.31 | 68.84 | 66.13 | 71.37 | 5.24 | 0.02 |
| Cambodia | Pailin | 70.15 | 67.90 | 72.24 | 4.34 | −1.92 | 68.23 | 0.30 | 68.53 | 65.84 | 71.00 | 5.16 | −1.62 |
| Cambodia | Kampot | 69.83 | 67.60 | 71.86 | 4.26 | −1.72 | 68.11 | 0.30 | 68.41 | 65.73 | 70.86 | 5.13 | −1.42 |
| Cambodia | Svay Rieng | 68.31 | 66.12 | 70.04 | 3.92 | −1.11 | 67.20 | 0.30 | 67.50 | 64.87 | 69.78 | 4.91 | −0.81 |
| Cambodia | Kampong Chhnang | 68.38 | 66.20 | 70.13 | 3.93 | −1.49 | 66.89 | 0.30 | 67.19 | 64.57 | 69.40 | 4.83 | −1.19 |
| Cambodia | Mondulkiri | 66.76 | 64.62 | 68.18 | 3.56 | −0.74 | 66.02 | 0.30 | 66.32 | 63.75 | 68.36 | 4.61 | −0.44 |
| Kazakhstan | Central region (Karagandinskaya) | 74.31 | 70.08 | 78.54 | 8.46 | −2.29 | 72.02 | 0.13 | 72.15 | 68.24 | 76.15 | 7.91 | −2.16 |
| Kazakhstan | North region (Astana city, Akmolinskaya, Kostnaiskaya, Pavlodarskaya, North-Kazakhstanskaya) | 73.75 | 69.57 | 77.88 | 8.31 | −2.27 | 71.48 | 0.13 | 71.61 | 67.75 | 75.51 | 7.76 | −2.14 |
| Kazakhstan | West region (Aktyubinskaya, Atyrauskaya, Mangistauskaya, West-Kazakhstanskaya) | 71.66 | 67.63 | 75.39 | 7.76 | −2.21 | 69.45 | 0.13 | 69.58 | 65.86 | 73.10 | 7.24 | −2.08 |
| Kazakhstan | South region (Almatinskaya, Zhambylskaya, Kyzylordinskaya, Turkestanskaya) | 70.42 | 66.48 | 73.91 | 7.43 | −2.17 | 68.25 | 0.13 | 68.38 | 64.73 | 71.67 | 6.94 | −2.04 |
| Kazakhstan | Almaty city | 69.92 | 66.00 | 73.31 | 7.31 | −2.16 | 67.76 | 0.13 | 67.89 | 64.27 | 71.08 | 6.81 | −2.03 |
| Kazakhstan | East region (East-Kazakhstanskaya) | 68.74 | 64.89 | 71.89 | 7.00 | −2.12 | 66.62 | 0.12 | 66.74 | 63.19 | 69.71 | 6.52 | −2.00 |
| Kyrgyzstan | Chüy Region | 72.90 | 68.70 | 77.34 | 8.64 | −1.28 | 71.62 | 0.51 | 72.13 | 67.73 | 76.91 | 9.18 | −0.77 |
| Kyrgyzstan | Batken Region | 72.12 | 67.99 | 76.42 | 8.43 | −1.26 | 70.86 | 0.51 | 71.37 | 67.03 | 75.99 | 8.96 | −0.75 |
| Kyrgyzstan | Osh City | 71.22 | 67.16 | 75.34 | 8.18 | −1.26 | 69.96 | 0.51 | 70.47 | 66.21 | 74.91 | 8.70 | −0.75 |
| Kyrgyzstan | Issyk-Kul Region | 70.77 | 66.75 | 74.81 | 8.06 | −1.24 | 69.53 | 0.50 | 70.03 | 65.80 | 74.38 | 8.58 | −0.74 |
| Kyrgyzstan | Jalal-Abad Region | 70.69 | 66.67 | 74.70 | 8.03 | −1.25 | 69.44 | 0.51 | 69.95 | 65.72 | 74.28 | 8.56 | −0.74 |
| Kyrgyzstan | Bishkek City | 70.63 | 66.62 | 74.64 | 8.02 | −1.24 | 69.39 | 0.50 | 69.89 | 65.67 | 74.22 | 8.55 | −0.74 |
| Kyrgyzstan | Talas Region | 70.33 | 66.33 | 74.27 | 7.94 | −1.24 | 69.09 | 0.50 | 69.59 | 65.39 | 73.85 | 8.46 | −0.74 |
| Kyrgyzstan | Naryn Region | 69.33 | 65.40 | 73.08 | 7.68 | −1.22 | 68.11 | 0.49 | 68.60 | 64.48 | 72.66 | 8.18 | −0.73 |
| Myanmar | Mon State | 70.78 | 67.62 | 74.99 | 7.37 | −0.99 | 69.79 | 1.68 | 71.47 | 68.27 | 75.72 | 7.45 | 0.69 |
| Myanmar | Yangon Region | 70.45 | 67.30 | 74.59 | 7.29 | −0.99 | 69.46 | 1.68 | 71.14 | 67.95 | 75.31 | 7.36 | 0.69 |
| Myanmar | Kayah State | 69.78 | 66.66 | 73.75 | 7.09 | −0.98 | 68.80 | 1.66 | 70.46 | 67.30 | 74.47 | 7.17 | 0.68 |
| Myanmar | Magway Region | 68.98 | 65.89 | 72.76 | 6.87 | −0.97 | 68.01 | 1.64 | 69.65 | 66.52 | 73.47 | 6.95 | 0.67 |
| Myanmar | Rakhine State | 68.58 | 65.50 | 72.27 | 6.77 | −0.96 | 67.62 | 1.63 | 69.25 | 66.13 | 72.97 | 6.84 | 0.67 |
| Myanmar | Kachin State | 68.18 | 65.11 | 71.76 | 6.65 | −0.96 | 67.22 | 1.62 | 68.84 | 65.73 | 72.46 | 6.73 | 0.66 |
| Myanmar | Mandalay Region | 67.14 | 64.09 | 70.46 | 6.37 | −0.95 | 66.19 | 1.60 | 67.79 | 64.71 | 71.15 | 6.44 | 0.65 |
| Myanmar | Sagaing Region | 67.09 | 64.04 | 70.40 | 6.36 | −0.95 | 66.14 | 1.60 | 67.74 | 64.66 | 71.08 | 6.42 | 0.65 |
| Myanmar | Ayeyarwady Region | 65.21 | 62.18 | 68.03 | 5.85 | −0.92 | 64.29 | 1.55 | 65.84 | 62.77 | 68.69 | 5.92 | 0.63 |
| Myanmar | Tanintharyi Region | 65.12 | 62.08 | 67.91 | 5.83 | −0.92 | 64.20 | 1.55 | 65.75 | 62.68 | 68.57 | 5.89 | 0.63 |
| Myanmar | Bago Region | 65.07 | 62.03 | 67.85 | 5.82 | −0.92 | 64.15 | 1.55 | 65.70 | 62.63 | 68.51 | 5.88 | 0.63 |
| Myanmar | Kayin State | 65.00 | 61.96 | 67.76 | 5.80 | −0.92 | 64.08 | 1.55 | 65.63 | 62.55 | 68.42 | 5.87 | 0.63 |
| Myanmar | Shan State | 63.14 | 60.07 | 65.38 | 5.31 | −0.88 | 62.26 | 1.50 | 63.76 | 60.65 | 66.02 | 5.37 | 0.62 |
| Myanmar | Chin State | 62.44 | 59.34 | 64.47 | 5.13 | −0.88 | 61.56 | 1.48 | 63.04 | 59.91 | 65.10 | 5.19 | 0.60 |
| Turkmenistan | Ashgabat | 70.98 | — | — | — | 0.26 | 71.24 | 0.15 | 71.39 | 67.78 | 75.30 | 7.52 | 0.41 |
| Turkmenistan | Lebap Region | 70.25 | — | — | — | 0.27 | 70.52 | 0.15 | 70.67 | 67.10 | 74.43 | 7.33 | 0.42 |
| Turkmenistan | Balkan Region | 69.90 | — | — | — | 0.26 | 70.16 | 0.15 | 70.31 | 66.77 | 74.00 | 7.23 | 0.41 |
| Turkmenistan | Ahal Region | 69.24 | — | — | — | 0.26 | 69.50 | 0.15 | 69.65 | 66.14 | 73.21 | 7.07 | 0.41 |
| Turkmenistan | Daşoguz Region | 68.59 | — | — | — | 0.26 | 68.85 | 0.15 | 69.00 | 65.53 | 72.42 | 6.89 | 0.41 |
| Turkmenistan | Mary Region | 66.54 | — | — | — | 0.25 | 66.79 | 0.14 | 66.93 | 63.55 | 69.91 | 6.36 | 0.39 |
| Indonesia | Special Region of Yogyakarta | 72.96 | 70.80 | 75.48 | 4.68 | −3.05 | 69.91 | 0.70 | 70.61 | 68.42 | 73.23 | 4.81 | −2.35 |
| Indonesia | Central Java | 72.19 | 70.07 | 74.57 | 4.50 | −3.02 | 69.17 | 0.70 | 69.87 | 67.72 | 72.35 | 4.63 | −2.32 |
| Indonesia | West Kalimantan | 72.00 | 69.89 | 74.35 | 4.46 | −3.01 | 68.99 | 0.69 | 69.68 | 67.55 | 72.14 | 4.59 | −2.32 |
| Indonesia | Special Capital Region of Jakarta | 71.95 | 69.84 | 74.29 | 4.45 | −3.01 | 68.94 | 0.69 | 69.63 | 67.50 | 72.08 | 4.58 | −2.32 |
| Indonesia | Bengkulu | 71.91 | 69.81 | 74.25 | 4.44 | −3.00 | 68.91 | 0.69 | 69.60 | 67.47 | 72.04 | 4.57 | −2.31 |
| Indonesia | West Sumatra | 71.72 | 69.63 | 74.02 | 4.39 | −3.00 | 68.72 | 0.69 | 69.41 | 67.29 | 71.82 | 4.53 | −2.31 |
| Indonesia | East Kalimantan | 71.40 | 69.32 | 73.64 | 4.32 | −2.99 | 68.41 | 0.69 | 69.10 | 66.99 | 71.45 | 4.46 | −2.30 |
| Indonesia | Bali | 70.98 | 68.92 | 73.15 | 4.23 | −2.97 | 68.01 | 0.69 | 68.70 | 66.61 | 70.97 | 4.36 | −2.28 |
| Indonesia | West Java | 70.98 | 68.92 | 73.14 | 4.22 | −2.97 | 68.01 | 0.69 | 68.70 | 66.61 | 70.97 | 4.36 | −2.28 |
| Indonesia | Riau Islands | 70.90 | 68.85 | 73.05 | 4.20 | −2.96 | 67.94 | 0.68 | 68.62 | 66.53 | 70.88 | 4.35 | −2.28 |
| Indonesia | West Nusa Tenggara | 70.66 | 68.61 | 72.76 | 4.15 | −2.96 | 67.70 | 0.68 | 68.38 | 66.31 | 70.60 | 4.29 | −2.28 |
| Indonesia | East Java | 70.63 | 68.59 | 72.74 | 4.15 | −2.95 | 67.68 | 0.68 | 68.36 | 66.29 | 70.57 | 4.28 | −2.27 |
| Indonesia | South Sumatra | 70.54 | 68.50 | 72.63 | 4.13 | −2.95 | 67.59 | 0.68 | 68.27 | 66.20 | 70.46 | 4.26 | −2.27 |
| Indonesia | Lampung | 70.50 | 68.47 | 72.58 | 4.11 | −2.94 | 67.56 | 0.68 | 68.24 | 66.17 | 70.42 | 4.25 | −2.26 |
| Indonesia | West Sulawesi | 70.36 | 68.33 | 72.41 | 4.08 | −2.94 | 67.42 | 0.68 | 68.10 | 66.04 | 70.26 | 4.22 | −2.26 |
| Indonesia | Aceh | 70.29 | 68.27 | 72.33 | 4.06 | −2.93 | 67.36 | 0.67 | 68.03 | 65.97 | 70.18 | 4.21 | −2.26 |
| Indonesia | North Sumatra | 70.24 | 68.21 | 72.26 | 4.05 | −2.94 | 67.30 | 0.68 | 67.98 | 65.92 | 70.11 | 4.19 | −2.26 |
| Indonesia | Central Kalimantan | 70.00 | 67.99 | 71.99 | 4.00 | −2.92 | 67.08 | 0.67 | 67.75 | 65.70 | 69.84 | 4.14 | −2.25 |
| Indonesia | Jambi | 69.84 | 67.83 | 71.79 | 3.96 | −2.92 | 66.92 | 0.67 | 67.59 | 65.55 | 69.66 | 4.11 | −2.25 |
| Indonesia | Banten | 69.40 | 67.40 | 71.26 | 3.86 | −2.91 | 66.49 | 0.67 | 67.16 | 65.14 | 69.14 | 4.00 | −2.24 |
| Indonesia | South Kalimantan | 69.22 | 67.23 | 71.05 | 3.82 | −2.89 | 66.33 | 0.66 | 66.99 | 64.97 | 68.94 | 3.97 | −2.23 |
| Indonesia | East Nusa Tenggara | 68.77 | 66.79 | 70.51 | 3.72 | −2.88 | 65.89 | 0.66 | 66.55 | 64.55 | 68.41 | 3.86 | −2.22 |
| Indonesia | North Sulawesi | 68.66 | 66.69 | 70.39 | 3.70 | −2.87 | 65.79 | 0.66 | 66.45 | 64.45 | 68.29 | 3.84 | −2.21 |
| Indonesia | Central Sulawesi | 68.61 | 66.64 | 70.32 | 3.68 | −2.87 | 65.74 | 0.66 | 66.40 | 64.40 | 68.23 | 3.83 | −2.21 |
| Indonesia | South Sulawesi | 68.37 | 66.41 | 70.04 | 3.63 | −2.86 | 65.51 | 0.66 | 66.17 | 64.18 | 67.95 | 3.77 | −2.20 |
| Indonesia | Bangka Belitung Islands | 67.57 | 65.63 | 69.08 | 3.45 | −2.83 | 64.74 | 0.66 | 65.40 | 63.42 | 67.02 | 3.60 | −2.17 |
| Indonesia | Maluku | 66.82 | 64.89 | 68.18 | 3.29 | −2.79 | 64.03 | 0.64 | 64.67 | 62.71 | 66.15 | 3.44 | −2.15 |
| Indonesia | Gorontalo | 66.24 | 64.32 | 67.47 | 3.15 | −2.77 | 63.47 | 0.64 | 64.11 | 62.16 | 65.47 | 3.31 | −2.13 |
| Indonesia | Papua | 63.92 | 61.99 | 64.65 | 2.66 | −2.67 | 61.25 | 0.62 | 61.87 | 59.91 | 62.73 | 2.82 | −2.05 |
| Papua New Guinea | Autonomous Region of Bougainville | 69.58 | 66.87 | 73.68 | 6.81 | −0.13 | 69.45 | 0.64 | 70.09 | 67.32 | 74.22 | 6.90 | 0.51 |
| Papua New Guinea | Western Highlands | 68.96 | 66.29 | 72.93 | 6.64 | −0.13 | 68.83 | 0.64 | 69.47 | 66.73 | 73.46 | 6.73 | 0.51 |
| Papua New Guinea | Milne Bay | 68.62 | 65.97 | 72.51 | 6.54 | −0.13 | 68.49 | 0.63 | 69.12 | 66.40 | 73.04 | 6.64 | 0.50 |
| Papua New Guinea | West New Britain | 68.10 | 65.48 | 71.88 | 6.40 | −0.13 | 67.97 | 0.63 | 68.60 | 65.91 | 72.41 | 6.50 | 0.50 |
| Papua New Guinea | Central | 67.87 | 65.26 | 71.60 | 6.34 | −0.13 | 67.74 | 0.63 | 68.37 | 65.69 | 72.12 | 6.43 | 0.50 |
| Papua New Guinea | East New Britain | 67.64 | 65.04 | 71.32 | 6.28 | −0.13 | 67.51 | 0.63 | 68.14 | 65.47 | 71.84 | 6.37 | 0.50 |
| Papua New Guinea | Madang | 67.49 | 64.90 | 71.14 | 6.24 | −0.12 | 67.37 | 0.62 | 67.99 | 65.33 | 71.66 | 6.33 | 0.50 |
| Papua New Guinea | Manus | 66.73 | 64.17 | 70.21 | 6.04 | −0.13 | 66.60 | 0.62 | 67.22 | 64.59 | 70.72 | 6.13 | 0.49 |
| Papua New Guinea | Western (Fly) | 66.66 | 64.11 | 70.13 | 6.02 | −0.12 | 66.54 | 0.62 | 67.16 | 64.53 | 70.64 | 6.11 | 0.50 |
| Papua New Guinea | Gulf | 66.63 | 64.08 | 70.09 | 6.01 | −0.12 | 66.51 | 0.62 | 67.13 | 64.50 | 70.61 | 6.11 | 0.50 |
| Papua New Guinea | Sandaun (West Sepik) | 66.62 | 64.06 | 70.07 | 6.01 | −0.13 | 66.49 | 0.62 | 67.11 | 64.49 | 70.58 | 6.09 | 0.49 |
| Papua New Guinea | Hela | 66.39 | 63.84 | 69.79 | 5.95 | −0.13 | 66.26 | 0.62 | 66.88 | 64.26 | 70.30 | 6.04 | 0.49 |
| Papua New Guinea | New Ireland | 66.01 | 63.48 | 69.33 | 5.85 | −0.12 | 65.89 | 0.61 | 66.50 | 63.90 | 69.84 | 5.94 | 0.49 |
| Papua New Guinea | Oro (Northern) | 65.90 | 63.38 | 69.20 | 5.82 | −0.12 | 65.78 | 0.61 | 66.39 | 63.79 | 69.70 | 5.91 | 0.49 |
| Papua New Guinea | National Capital District | 65.85 | 63.33 | 69.14 | 5.81 | −0.12 | 65.73 | 0.61 | 66.34 | 63.75 | 69.64 | 5.89 | 0.49 |
| Papua New Guinea | Morobe | 65.27 | 62.77 | 68.42 | 5.65 | −0.12 | 65.15 | 0.61 | 65.76 | 63.18 | 68.92 | 5.74 | 0.49 |
| Papua New Guinea | Jiwaka | 65.19 | 62.69 | 68.32 | 5.63 | −0.12 | 65.07 | 0.60 | 65.67 | 63.10 | 68.82 | 5.72 | 0.48 |
| Papua New Guinea | East Sepik | 64.79 | 62.30 | 67.83 | 5.53 | −0.12 | 64.67 | 0.60 | 65.27 | 62.71 | 68.33 | 5.62 | 0.48 |
| Papua New Guinea | Chimbu (Simbu) | 64.30 | 61.82 | 67.22 | 5.40 | −0.12 | 64.18 | 0.59 | 64.77 | 62.23 | 67.71 | 5.48 | 0.47 |
| Papua New Guinea | Eastern Highlands | 63.11 | 60.65 | 65.74 | 5.09 | −0.12 | 62.99 | 0.59 | 63.58 | 61.05 | 66.22 | 5.17 | 0.47 |
| Papua New Guinea | Enga | 59.85 | 57.36 | 61.63 | 4.27 | −0.11 | 59.74 | 0.55 | 60.29 | 57.73 | 62.08 | 4.35 | 0.44 |
| Papua New Guinea | Southern Highlands | 59.37 | 56.86 | 61.02 | 4.16 | −0.11 | 59.26 | 0.55 | 59.81 | 57.23 | 61.46 | 4.23 | 0.44 |
| Yemen | Al Jawf, Hadramaut, Shabwah, Ma'rib, Al Mahrah | 68.45 | 64.94 | 72.83 | 7.89 | −1.29 | 67.16 | 0.03 | 67.19 | 63.70 | 71.56 | 7.86 | −1.26 |
| Yemen | Abyan, Aden, Lahij, Dhale | 68.04 | 64.56 | 72.32 | 7.76 | −1.16 | 66.88 | 0.09 | 66.97 | 63.50 | 71.29 | 7.79 | −1.07 |
| Yemen | Taiz | 65.47 | 62.16 | 69.10 | 6.94 | −1.11 | 64.36 | 0.08 | 64.44 | 61.16 | 68.13 | 6.97 | −1.03 |
| Yemen | Sana'a | 65.04 | 61.76 | 68.56 | 6.80 | −1.67 | 63.37 | −0.19 | 63.18 | 59.98 | 66.54 | 6.56 | −1.86 |
| Yemen | Hajjah, Sa'dah, 'Amran | 64.85 | 61.58 | 68.32 | 6.74 | −1.54 | 63.31 | −0.13 | 63.18 | 59.98 | 66.54 | 6.56 | −1.67 |
| Yemen | Al Hudaydah, Al Mahwit | 64.28 | 61.04 | 67.60 | 6.56 | −1.17 | 63.11 | 0.04 | 63.15 | 59.95 | 66.50 | 6.55 | −1.13 |
| Yemen | Ibb | 64.35 | 61.11 | 67.69 | 6.58 | −1.38 | 62.97 | −0.06 | 62.91 | 59.73 | 66.20 | 6.47 | −1.44 |
| Yemen | Al Bayda, Dhamar, Raymah | 62.88 | 59.70 | 65.82 | 6.12 | −1.34 | 61.54 | −0.06 | 61.48 | 58.36 | 64.37 | 6.01 | −1.40 |
| Afghanistan | South East (Ghazni, Paktia, Paktika, Khost) | 66.08 | 63.00 | 69.84 | 6.84 | −1.65 | 64.43 | 0.94 | 65.37 | 62.11 | 69.36 | 7.25 | −0.71 |
| Afghanistan | Central (Kabul, Wardak, Kapisa, Logar, Parwan, Panjshir) | 65.47 | 62.43 | 69.08 | 6.65 | −1.63 | 63.84 | 0.93 | 64.77 | 61.55 | 68.60 | 7.05 | −0.70 |
| Afghanistan | Central Highlands (Bamyan, Daykundi) | 64.01 | 61.04 | 67.24 | 6.20 | −1.59 | 62.42 | 0.90 | 63.32 | 60.18 | 66.77 | 6.59 | −0.69 |
| Afghanistan | South (Uruzgan, Helmand, Zabul, Nimruz, Kandahar) | 63.39 | 60.45 | 66.45 | 6.00 | −1.58 | 61.81 | 0.90 | 62.71 | 59.60 | 65.99 | 6.39 | −0.68 |
| Afghanistan | East (Nangarhar, Kunar, Laghman, Nuristan) | 63.04 | 60.12 | 66.01 | 5.89 | −1.57 | 61.47 | 0.89 | 62.36 | 59.27 | 65.55 | 6.28 | −0.68 |
| Afghanistan | West (Ghor, Herat, Badghis, Farah) | 62.95 | 60.03 | 65.89 | 5.86 | −1.57 | 61.38 | 0.89 | 62.27 | 59.18 | 65.43 | 6.25 | −0.68 |
| Afghanistan | North (Samangan, Sar-e Pol, Balkh, Jowzjan, Faryab) | 62.40 | 59.50 | 65.19 | 5.69 | −1.56 | 60.84 | 0.88 | 61.72 | 58.66 | 64.74 | 6.08 | −0.68 |
| Afghanistan | North East (Baghlan, Takhar, Badakhshan, Kunduz) | 62.04 | 59.15 | 64.74 | 5.59 | −1.54 | 60.50 | 0.88 | 61.38 | 58.32 | 64.29 | 5.97 | −0.66 |

* De facto there are two states on the island Cyprus: the Republic of Cyprus (~70% of the island's population) and Northern Cyprus, recognized only by Turkey. Due to national, cultural, economic, natural and climatic features, life expectancy in them can differ.

** Statistics for the Southern Federal District of Russia are given without taking into account Crimea. But according to Rosstat estimates, the life expectancy in Crimea in these years is close to the average life expectancy in the Southern FD, and the population of Crimea is less than 15% of the population of the district. Therefore, the inclusion or non-inclusion of statistics on Crimea in the statistics of the Southern FD affects the latter only within a tenth of a year.

*** Parts of these Georgian regions are inside South Ossetia - a disputed territory, de facto this is a partially recognised state. There are no available data on life expectancy in South Ossetia, the statistics for the mentioned Georgian regions are given without the statistics for South Ossetia.

== See also ==
- List of Asian countries by life expectancy
- List of countries in the Middle East by life expectancy
- List of Japanese prefectures by life expectancy
- List of South Korean regions by life expectancy
- List of Chinese administrative divisions by life expectancy
- List of cities in China by life expectancy
- List of Indian states by life expectancy at birth
- List of regions of Israel and Palestine by life expectancy
- List of regions of Kazakhstan by life expectancy
- List of Tajikistani regions by life expectancy
- List of federal subjects of Russia by life expectancy
- List of Turkish provinces by life expectancy
- List of oldest people
- Longevity
- Life extension
