= List of Tajikistani regions by life expectancy =

Tajikistan, officially the Republic of Tajikistan, is a landlocked country in Central Asia. It consists of four administrative provinces (viloyat): Sughd, Khatlon, the autonomous province of Gorno-Badakhshan (abbreviated as GBAO), and the Regions of Republican Subordination (RRP). Each province is further divided into districts, which in turn are subdivided into jamoats (village-level self-governing units) and then villages (qyshloqs). As of 2006, there were 58 districts and 367 jamoats in Tajikistan. Districts under Tajikistan Central Government Jurisdiction, also known as Districts of Republican Subordination, are regions surrounding Dushanbe (the capital city) that are directly governed by the central administration.

This list presents the region-wise life expectancy in Tajikistan. The national average in 2019 was 75.1 years, with 73.5 years for males and 76.8 years for females. GBAO has the highest life expectancy for both genders.

== Agency of Statistics ==
Region	2019			
Region	male	female	sex gap	arith. mean
Tajikstan	73.5	76.8	3.3	75.1
GBAO	75.3	81.8	6.5	78.55
Khatlon Region	73.1	76.1	3.0	74.6
Sughd Region	72.9	76.5	3.6	74.7
Dushanbe	74.9	78.1	3.2	76.5
Districts under Republican Subordination	74.1	76.8	2.7	75.45

== Global Data Lab (2019–2022) ==
region	2019				2019 →2021	2021	2021 →2022	2022				2019 →2022
region	overall	male	female	F Δ M	2019 →2021	overall	2021 →2022	overall	male	female	F Δ M	2019 →2022
Tajikistan on average	70.87	68.86	73.01	4.15	0.72	71.59	−0.30	71.29	69.19	73.52	4.33	0.42
Dushanbe	74.78	72.59	77.58	4.99	0.76	75.54	−0.32	75.22	72.94	78.12	5.18	0.44
Gorno-Badakhshan	71.50	69.48	73.76	4.28	0.74	72.24	−0.31	71.93	69.81	74.27	4.46	0.43
Districts under Central Government Jurisdiction	71.50	69.47	73.75	4.28	0.73	72.23	−0.31	71.92	69.80	74.26	4.46	0.42
Sughd Region	70.93	68.92	73.08	4.16	0.73	71.66	−0.31	71.35	69.25	73.59	4.34	0.42
Khatlon Region	69.74	67.77	71.68	3.91	0.72	70.46	−0.31	70.15	68.09	72.18	4.09	0.41

Data source: Global Data Lab
