= List of regions of Turkmenistan by Human Development Index =

This is a list of Turkmen regions and the capital city of Ashgabat by Human Development Index as of 2025 with data for the year 2023.

Rank	Region	HDI (2023)
Very high human development
1	Ashghabat City	0.820
High human development
2	Balkan Velayat	0.775
3	Lebap Velayat	0.770
–	Turkmenistan	0.764
4	Ahal Velayat	0.758
5	Mary Velayat	0.745
6	Dashoghuz Velayat	0.742

== See also ==
- List of countries by Human Development Index
