= List of regions of Uzbekistan by Human Development Index =

This is a list of regions of the Republic of Uzbekistan by Human Development Index as of 2024 with data for the year 2024.

Rank	Area	Region	HDI (2024)
Very high human development
1	Tashkent	Tashkent Region and Tashkent City	0.840
High human development
2	Central-East	Samarqand region	0.780
2	Central-East	Namangan region	0.780
–		Uzbekistan (average)	0.750
3	West	Republic of Karakalpakstan	0.745
3	West	Khorezm Vilayat	0.745
4	Central	Navoi Region	0.740
4	Central	Bukhara Region	0.740
4	Central	Jizzax region	0.740
4	East	Andijan Region	0.740
4	East	Fergana Region	0.740
4	East	Surxondaryo region	0.740
5	South	Kashkadarya Region	0.730
5	South	Syrdarya region	0.730

== See also ==
- List of countries by Human Development Index
