= List of regions of Kazakhstan by life expectancy =

The following is a list of the 17 regions and 3 cities with regional status of Kazakhstan by life expectancy. The country has 20 first-level administrative divisions, including 17 regions (14 before 2022) and 3 cities, Astana, Almaty and Shymkent who are not belonging to any of the 17 regions due to the fact that Astana is the capital of Kazakhstan and because of their high population. Kazakhstan has seen significant growth in the life expectancy of its regions, though there are significant differences between the country, as well as the urban and rural areas of each of the 17 regions. Also, there are other factors that are responsible for regional differences, as more industrialised regions often have lesser life expectancy due to environmental reasons and areas with higher presence of the services sector have higher life expectancy. Studies have also found regional variations of the life expectancy due to differing mortality trends among Kazakhstan's main ethnicities: Kazakhs and Russians.

Kazakhstan's Bureau of National Statistics is the source of all the data shown in this article. The Bureau is publishing annually information about the life expectancy of Kazakhstan's regions, as well as separate data for the life expectancy by gender and by type of area (urban and rural areas).

Life expectancy in Kazakhstan has increased consistently for each year from 2005 to 2019, during which life expectancy for males went from 60.30 years to 69.21 years and life expectancy for females went from 71.77 years to 77.47 years, reaching a national total of 73.39 years. After a decline to 70.38 years in 2021 due to the COVID-19 pandemic, in 2022 growth resumed and the life expectancy reached 74.45 years in 2022. The tables below include data from Kazakhstan's Bureau of National Statistics, which has published data on life expectancy by year, region, gender, and settlement type (urban and rural) consistently.

Below are shown the data of the latest year with available data (currently, 2025) and below the historical progression of life expectancy in the whole population and then by gender between 1999 and 2025.

== Latest data (2025) ==
| Region | 2025 | | | |
| Region | Overall | male | female | sex gap |
|---|---|---|---|---|
| Republic of Kazakhstan | 75.97 | 72.19 | 79.80 | 7.61 |
| Almaty city | 78.83 | 75.41 | 81.80 | 6.39 |
| Astana city | 78.78 | 76.41 | 81.57 | 5.16 |
| Shymkent city | 77.76 | 75.55 | 80.71 | 5.16 |
| Mangystau | 76.66 | 74.67 | 79.86 | 5.19 |
| Jambyl | 76.24 | 73.06 | 80.13 | 7.07 |
| Aktobe | 76.15 | 72.04 | 80.06 | 8.02 |
| Atyrau | 75.82 | 71.75 | 79.88 | 8.13 |
| Jetisu | 75.71 | 71.47 | 80.02 | 8.55 |
| Almaty (Region) | 75.65 | 72.53 | 79.05 | 6.52 |
| Akmola | 75.54 | 71.60 | 80.06 | 8.44 |
| Turkistan | 75.45 | 72.31 | 78.76 | 6.45 |
| Kostanay | 74.94 | 70.84 | 79.24 | 8.40 |
| Pavlodar | 74.93 | 71.16 | 79.11 | 7.95 |
| West Kazakhstan | 74.92 | 69.81 | 79.98 | 10.17 |
| Kyzylorda | 74.88 | 71.11 | 78.84 | 7.73 |
| Abai | 74.87 | 70.85 | 79.17 | 8.32 |
| Karagandy | 74.49 | 70.33 | 78.58 | 8.25 |
| East Kazakhstan | 73.76 | 69.45 | 78.54 | 9.04 |
| North Kazakhstan | 73.63 | 69.34 | 77.99 | 8.55 |
| Ulytau | 73.56 | 70.68 | 77.86 | 7.18 |

== Past data (1999-2025) ==
| Region | 1999 | 2000 | 2001 | 2002 | 2003 | 2004 | 2005 | 2006 | 2007 | 2008 | 2009 | 2010 | 2011 | 2012 | 2013 | 2014 | 2015 | 2016 | 2017 | 2018 | 2019 | 2020 | 2021 | 2022 | 2023 | 2024 | 2025 |
|---|---|---|---|---|---|---|---|---|---|---|---|---|---|---|---|---|---|---|---|---|---|---|---|---|---|---|---|
| Republic of Kazakhstan | 65.63 | 65.50 | 65.80 | 66.00 | 65.83 | 66.18 | 65.91 | 66.15 | 66.34 | 67.11 | 68.39 | 68.45 | 68.69 | 69.52 | 70.62 | 71.44 | 71.97 | 72.41 | 72.95 | 73.15 | 73.18 | 71.37 | 70.23 | 74.44 | 75.09 | 75.44 | 75.97 |
| Abai | Part of East Kazakhstan until 2022 | | | | | | | | | | | | | | | | | | | | | | | 73.80 | 74.14 | 75.02 | 74.87 |
| Akmola | 64.38 | 64.33 | 63.31 | 64.60 | 63.71 | 63.94 | 63.49 | 63.58 | 63.77 | 64.96 | 66.12 | 66.43 | 66.62 | 67.27 | 68.54 | 69.68 | 70.38 | 70.91 | 70.80 | 71.60 | 71.43 | 70.09 | 68.86 | 73.48 | 74.25 | 74.20 | 75.54 |
| Aktobe | 65.25 | 63.89 | 63.88 | 63.92 | 64.34 | 65.41 | 65.71 | 65.69 | 66.17 | 67.61 | 68.63 | 69.26 | 70.23 | 70.06 | 71.38 | 71.94 | 72.33 | 72.82 | 73.47 | 73.45 | 73.58 | 71.69 | 70.83 | 74.85 | 74.71 | 75.18 | 76.15 |
| Almaty | 66.74 | 66.80 | 67.42 | 67.44 | 66.89 | 67.02 | 66.41 | 66.46 | 66.37 | 67.52 | 69.17 | 69.11 | 69.76 | 69.84 | 70.99 | 71.82 | 71.87 | 72.46 | 72.70 | 73.44 | 73.41 | 71.73 | 70.53 | 73.87 | 74.53 | 74.79 | 75.65 |
| Atyrau | 63.86 | 64.36 | 64.93 | 64.40 | 65.32 | 65.94 | 66.65 | 66.17 | 66.56 | 67.42 | 68.20 | 68.33 | 69.20 | 69.34 | 70.98 | 71.66 | 72.26 | 71.68 | 73.22 | 73.13 | 73.27 | 70.52 | 70.01 | 74.66 | 75.29 | 75.29 | 75.82 |
| West Kazakhstan | 65.23 | 65.28 | 65.05 | 64.85 | 64.97 | 66.54 | 66.46 | 66.59 | 66.24 | 67.30 | 68.18 | 68.54 | 68.95 | 69.58 | 70.39 | 71.11 | 71.56 | 71.66 | 72.38 | 72.43 | 72.81 | 70.87 | 69.69 | 73.76 | 74.08 | 74.17 | 74.92 |
| Jambyl | 66.52 | 65.48 | 66.43 | 66.67 | 66.23 | 67.01 | 66.98 | 66.89 | 67.28 | 67.39 | 68.01 | 68.13 | 69.00 | 69.32 | 69.90 | 70.96 | 71.64 | 71.93 | 72.43 | 72.79 | 72.63 | 70.63 | 69.15 | 74.87 | 75.25 | 75.53 | 76.24 |
| Jetisu | Part of Almaty Region until 2022 | | | | | | | | | | | | | | | | | | | | | | | 74.38 | 74.64 | 74.97 | 75.71 |
| Karaganda | 63.90 | 64.05 | 64.16 | 64.30 | 63.82 | 63.79 | 63.95 | 63.92 | 63.70 | 64.64 | 66.64 | 66.53 | 67.27 | 67.40 | 69.03 | 70.12 | 70.55 | 70.89 | 71.57 | 71.70 | 71.69 | 70.38 | 69.14 | 72.30 | 73.43 | 73.97 | 74.49 |
| Kostanay | 64.99 | 64.85 | 65.71 | 65.96 | 65.17 | 65.41 | 65.28 | 65.19 | 64.93 | 65.59 | 67.49 | 67.62 | 67.52 | 68.28 | 69.69 | 70.30 | 70.73 | 71.36 | 72.20 | 72.36 | 72.42 | 70.72 | 69.29 | 72.68 | 73.65 | 74.28 | 74.94 |
| Kyzylorda | 65.43 | 65.57 | 65.78 | 65.61 | 66.25 | 67.01 | 66.03 | 66.04 | 66.86 | 67.48 | 67.56 | 68.32 | 68.97 | 69.29 | 70.47 | 70.78 | 71.80 | 71.91 | 72.60 | 72.98 | 72.79 | 70.15 | 70.83 | 74.21 | 74.58 | 75.15 | 74.88 |
| Mangystau | 64.35 | 64.19 | 63.34 | 63.92 | 65.01 | 65.33 | 64.98 | 65.62 | 66.57 | 66.78 | 69.59 | 69.63 | 70.46 | 71.19 | 71.73 | 72.43 | 72.83 | 73.58 | 74.34 | 73.73 | 74.14 | 71.10 | 70.57 | 75.83 | 75.84 | 75.62 | 76.66 |
| Pavlodar | 65.14 | 64.75 | 64.95 | 65.71 | 65.68 | 65.82 | 65.60 | 65.07 | 65.67 | 66.48 | 68.03 | 67.88 | 68.29 | 68.73 | 70.16 | 70.59 | 71.40 | 71.72 | 72.10 | 72.31 | 72.33 | 70.75 | 68.93 | 72.90 | 74.33 | 74.07 | 74.93 |
| North Kazakhstan | 65.14 | 65.00 | 65.14 | 64.84 | 64.76 | 65.03 | 64.92 | 64.81 | 64.73 | 65.41 | 66.73 | 66.54 | 66.76 | 67.37 | 68.07 | 69.62 | 70.39 | 71.01 | 70.86 | 71.14 | 70.70 | 69.90 | 68.57 | 72.27 | 73.13 | 73.68 | 73.63 |
| Turkistan | 67.13 | 67.32 | 67.39 | 67.17 | 67.07 | 67.85 | 67.36 | 67.61 | 67.65 | 67.90 | 69.44 | 69.60 | 69.87 | 70.55 | 71.11 | 71.61 | 72.14 | 72.58 | 72.45 | 72.95 | 72.73 | 70.67 | 70.18 | 75.04 | 74.94 | 75.32 | 75.45 |
| Ulytau | Part of Karaganda until 2022 | | | | | | | | | | | | | | | | | | | | | | | 71.44 | 72.41 | 72.48 | 73.56 |
| East Kazakhstan | 64.93 | 64.51 | 65.21 | 65.37 | 65.29 | 65.37 | 64.78 | 64.80 | 65.02 | 65.81 | 66.90 | 66.90 | 67.66 | 68.41 | 69.61 | 70.61 | 70.83 | 71.45 | 71.97 | 71.97 | 72.07 | 70.85 | 69.33 | 72.37 | 73.20 | 73.41 | 73.76 |
| Astana city | 67.60 | 69.16 | 69.05 | 69.43 | 70.45 | 70.84 | 70.70 | 71.39 | 72.63 | 73.75 | 72.39 | 73.19 | 73.61 | 73.64 | 74.45 | 74.88 | 74.67 | 74.85 | 76.21 | 76.21 | 76.75 | 73.49 | 72.87 | 77.30 | 78.09 | 78.52 | 78.78 |
| Almaty city | 67.98 | 67.75 | 68.41 | 68.73 | 68.17 | 67.75 | 67.40 | 69.66 | 70.45 | 70.35 | 71.39 | 70.92 | 71.74 | 72.52 | 73.55 | 74.07 | 75.39 | 75.78 | 76.01 | 75.54 | 75.45 | 74.02 | 71.97 | 77.32 | 78.28 | 78.78 | 78.83 |
| Shymkent city | Part of Turkistan until 2018 | | | | | | | | | | | | | | | | | | 74.34 | 74.65 | 74.41 | 71.00 | 70.49 | 75.61 | 76.32 | 77.22 | 77.76 |

=== Life expectancy (male) ===
| Region | 1999 | 2000 | 2001 | 2002 | 2003 | 2004 | 2005 | 2006 | 2007 | 2008 | 2009 | 2010 | 2011 | 2012 | 2013 | 2014 | 2015 | 2016 | 2017 | 2018 | 2019 | 2020 | 2021 | 2022 | 2023 | 2024 | 2025 |
|---|---|---|---|---|---|---|---|---|---|---|---|---|---|---|---|---|---|---|---|---|---|---|---|---|---|---|---|
| Republic of Kazakhstan | 60.58 | 60.15 | 60.50 | 60.70 | 60.52 | 60.62 | 60.30 | 60.67 | 60.70 | 61.91 | 63.55 | 63.54 | 64.22 | 64.72 | 65.89 | 66.91 | 67.50 | 67.91 | 68.98 | 69.30 | 69.21 | 67.36 | 66.64 | 70.22 | 70.99 | 71.30 | 72.19 |
| Abai | Part of East Kazakhstan until 2022 | | | | | | | | | | | | | | | | | | | | | | | 69.75 | 69.74 | 69.63 | 70.85 |
| Akmola | 59.45 | 58.65 | 57.59 | 58.73 | 58.47 | 58.31 | 57.84 | 57.91 | 58.21 | 59.21 | 61.18 | 61.04 | 61.62 | 62.26 | 63.64 | 64.52 | 65.61 | 66.04 | 66.16 | 67.22 | 66.55 | 65.76 | 65.07 | 68.99 | 69.77 | 70.40 | 71.60 |
| Aktobe | 60,33 | 58.67 | 58.34 | 58.35 | 58.63 | 59.16 | 59.56 | 59.70 | 59.56 | 62.31 | 63.59 | 64.07 | 65.28 | 65.04 | 66.41 | 67.22 | 67.64 | 67.94 | 69.42 | 69.35 | 69.76 | 67.81 | 67.13 | 70.51 | 70.75 | 70.91 | 72.04 |
| Almaty | 62.43 | 62.32 | 63.00 | 63.07 | 62.31 | 62.39 | 61.44 | 61.74 | 61.40 | 63.04 | 65.26 | 65.50 | 65.88 | 66.56 | 67.21 | 70.78 | 69.58 | 69.51 | 70.75 | 74.89 | 72.31 | 70.57 | 69.58 | 69.87 | 71.03 | 71.12 | 72.53 |
| Atyrau | 58.32 | 59.11 | 58.71 | 58,58 | 59.78 | 60.67 | 60.61 | 60.45 | 60.59 | 62.26 | 63.57 | 63.08 | 64.21 | 64.43 | 65.93 | 67.27 | 68.08 | 66.86 | 69.21 | 68.97 | 68.77 | 66.33 | 66.38 | 70.48 | 70.96 | 71.07 | 71.75 |
| West Kazakhstan | 59.88 | 59.44 | 59.91 | 59.55 | 59.28 | 60.98 | 60.94 | 61.12 | 60.26 | 62.12 | 62.90 | 63.25 | 63.62 | 64.14 | 65.27 | 66.14 | 66.52 | 66.38 | 67.58 | 67.69 | 67.91 | 66.07 | 65.45 | 69.02 | 69.51 | 69.42 | 69.81 |
| Jambyl | 62.26 | 60.25 | 61.69 | 61.88 | 61.08 | 62.01 | 62.09 | 61.59 | 62.12 | 62.41 | 63.18 | 63.13 | 64.44 | 64.63 | 65.41 | 66.82 | 67.35 | 67.66 | 68.47 | 68.75 | 68.61 | 66.85 | 65.76 | 70.90 | 71.13 | 71.62 | 73.06 |
| Jetisu | Part of Almaty Region until 2022 | | | | | | | | | | | | | | | | | | | | | | | 70.21 | 70.55 | 70.99 | 71.47 |
| Karaganda | 58.33 | 58.21 | 58.42 | 58.67 | 57.71 | 57.73 | 57.65 | 57.61 | 57.32 | 58.65 | 61.20 | 60.99 | 61.65 | 62.07 | 63.80 | 64.97 | 65.83 | 66.19 | 67.19 | 67.20 | 67.23 | 66.38 | 65.13 | 67.62 | 68.67 | 69.26 | 70.33 |
| Kostanay | 59.57 | 59.32 | 60.21 | 60.51 | 59.64 | 59.50 | 59.45 | 59.19 | 58.86 | 59.62 | 62.21 | 62.01 | 62.28 | 62.97 | 64.56 | 65.35 | 65.55 | 66.88 | 67.49 | 67.70 | 67.99 | 66.26 | 65.73 | 68.00 | 68.99 | 69.41 | 70.84 |
| Kyzylorda | 62.01 | 61.76 | 61.67 | 61.53 | 62.43 | 62.76 | 61.43 | 61.59 | 62.32 | 63.20 | 63.36 | 64.19 | 64.75 | 65.15 | 66.39 | 66.63 | 67.55 | 67.64 | 68.59 | 69.43 | 69.00 | 66.32 | 67.36 | 70.26 | 71.04 | 71.10 | 71.11 |
| Mangystau | 59.41 | 58.61 | 57.85 | 58.49 | 59.54 | 60.02 | 58.99 | 60.28 | 61.69 | 61.87 | 65.24 | 65.08 | 66.50 | 67.00 | 67.59 | 67.89 | 68.32 | 69.32 | 70.57 | 69.80 | 70.25 | 67.27 | 66.86 | 72.09 | 71.58 | 71.63 | 74.67 |
| Pavlodar | 59.80 | 58.93 | 58.90 | 59.92 | 59.48 | 59.82 | 59.43 | 59.03 | 59.22 | 60.82 | 62.57 | 62.37 | 62.90 | 63.16 | 65.04 | 65.69 | 66.27 | 66.75 | 67.70 | 67.51 | 67.58 | 66.19 | 65.31 | 68.12 | 69.63 | 69.83 | 71.16 |
| North Kazakhstan | 59.74 | 59.32 | 59.42 | 58.95 | 59.28 | 59.52 | 59.29 | 59.23 | 58.93 | 59.67 | 61.28 | 60.93 | 61.36 | 62.08 | 62.40 | 64.23 | 65.15 | 65.64 | 66.05 | 66.12 | 65.52 | 65.08 | 64.35 | 67.97 | 68.21 | 68.30 | 69.34 |
| Turkistan | 63.40 | 63.20 | 63.12 | 62.97 | 62.69 | 63.17 | 62.92 | 63.26 | 63.18 | 63.80 | 65.98 | 65.90 | 66.12 | 66.64 | 67.01 | 67.33 | 67.87 | 68.67 | 69.08 | 69.77 | 69.53 | 67.35 | 67.22 | 71.77 | 71.65 | 71.87 | 72.31 |
| Ulytau | Part of Karaganda until 2022 | | | | | | | | | | | | | | | | | | | | | | | 67.18 | 68.04 | 67.96 | 70.68 |
| East Kazakhstan | 59.57 | 58.53 | 59.37 | 59.53 | 59.63 | 59.53 | 58.96 | 58.92 | 58.96 | 60.21 | 60.12 | 60.36 | 61.21 | 62.02 | 63.46 | 64.72 | 64.94 | 65.09 | 66.22 | 66.15 | 65.58 | 65.20 | 63.87 | 67.27 | 68.60 | 68.28 | 69.45 |
| Astana city | 62.89 | 64.20 | 64.36 | 64.62 | 65.72 | 66.18 | 65.45 | 65.76 | 68.21 | 70.78 | 67.88 | 68.94 | 68.96 | 69.16 | 70.61 | 70.55 | 70.45 | 70.64 | 72.35 | 71.92 | 72.64 | 69.61 | 69.35 | 73.47 | 74.24 | 74.77 | 76.41 |
| Almaty city | 62.01 | 61.60 | 62.62 | 62.94 | 62.16 | 61.08 | 60.62 | 63.69 | 64.65 | 64.82 | 66.69 | 66.27 | 67.12 | 68.20 | 69.34 | 70.43 | 71.88 | 74.55 | 72.83 | 73.21 | 72.55 | 74.11 | 68.63 | 73.41 | 74.47 | 75.64 | 75.41 |
| Shymkent city | Part of Turkistan until 2018 | | | | | | | | | | | | | | | | | | 70.78 | 70.91 | 70.70 | 67.14 | 67.50 | 72.34 | 72.63 | 73.35 | 75.55 |

=== Life expectancy (female) ===
| Region | 1999 | 2000 | 2001 | 2002 | 2003 | 2004 | 2005 | 2006 | 2007 | 2008 | 2009 | 2010 | 2011 | 2012 | 2013 | 2014 | 2015 | 2016 | 2017 | 2018 | 2019 | 2020 | 2021 | 2022 | 2023 | 2024 | 2025 |
|---|---|---|---|---|---|---|---|---|---|---|---|---|---|---|---|---|---|---|---|---|---|---|---|---|---|---|---|
| Republic of Kazakhstan | 70.87 | 71.13 | 71.32 | 71.52 | 71.46 | 72.00 | 71.77 | 72.15 | 72.58 | 72.43 | 73.24 | 73.41 | 73.88 | 74.28 | 75.23 | 75.82 | 76.24 | 76.55 | 76.96 | 77.31 | 77.47 | 75.61 | 74.07 | 78.42 | 79.06 | 79.42 | 79.80 |
| Abai | Part of East Kazakhstan until 2022 | | | | | | | | | | | | | | | | | | | | | | | 77.69 | 78.32 | 79.67 | 79.17 |
| Akmola | 69.70 | 70.45 | 69.61 | 71.02 | 69.52 | 70.17 | 69.92 | 69.99 | 70.23 | 71.29 | 71.27 | 72.17 | 71.84 | 72.43 | 73.46 | 74.84 | 74.99 | 75.61 | 75.45 | 76.05 | 76.72 | 74.79 | 73.25 | 77.86 | 78.81 | 78.19 | 80.06 |
| Aktobe | 70.57 | 69.29 | 69.90 | 70.07 | 70.48 | 71.70 | 72.30 | 72.10 | 72.81 | 73.06 | 73.63 | 74.36 | 75.03 | 75.02 | 76.15 | 76.41 | 76.61 | 77.07 | 77.44 | 77.63 | 77.25 | 76.13 | 74.33 | 78.94 | 78.45 | 79.15 | 80.06 |
| Almaty | 71.14 | 71.47 | 72.06 | 71.97 | 71.84 | 71.96 | 71.76 | 71.66 | 71.94 | 72.34 | 73.65 | 73.58 | 74.31 | 74.34 | 75.21 | 75.81 | 76.41 | 76.77 | 77.02 | 77.63 | 77.79 | 76.00 | 74.85 | 77.66 | 78.22 | 78.61 | 79.05 |
| Atyrau | 69.67 | 70.30 | 71.51 | 70.91 | 71.29 | 72.08 | 72.44 | 72.35 | 73.11 | 72.54 | 72.85 | 73.73 | 74.24 | 74.28 | 75.96 | 75.80 | 76.18 | 76.33 | 76.96 | 76.99 | 77.77 | 74.72 | 73.98 | 78.56 | 79.33 | 79.30 | 79.88 |
| West Kazakhstan | 70.80 | 72.01 | 70.67 | 70.89 | 71.14 | 72.44 | 72.21 | 72.49 | 72.77 | 73.15 | 73.64 | 73.99 | 74.32 | 75.08 | 75.41 | 75.93 | 76.42 | 76.83 | 77.02 | 77.33 | 77.62 | 75.80 | 73.92 | 78.35 | 78.69 | 78.86 | 79.98 |
| Jambyl | 71.02 | 70.99 | 71.47 | 71.49 | 71.61 | 72.24 | 72.09 | 72.56 | 72.92 | 72.68 | 72.99 | 73.30 | 73.55 | 74.01 | 74.31 | 75.03 | 75.80 | 76.15 | 76.45 | 77.15 | 77.11 | 74.78 | 73.14 | 78.78 | 79.36 | 79.55 | 80.13 |
| Jetisu | Part of Almaty Region until 2022 | | | | | | | | | | | | | | | | | | | | | | | 78.46 | 78.64 | 79.06 | 80.02 |
| Karaganda | 69.99 | 70.40 | 70.28 | 70.29 | 70.41 | 70.17 | 70.68 | 70.91 | 70.64 | 70.78 | 72.05 | 72.16 | 72.92 | 72.78 | 74.15 | 74.87 | 75.15 | 75.44 | 75.70 | 76.33 | 76.21 | 74.82 | 73.14 | 76.72 | 77.84 | 78.30 | 78.58 |
| Kostanay | 70.77 | 70.78 | 71.50 | 71.68 | 71.14 | 71.78 | 71.30 | 71.64 | 71.50 | 71.87 | 72.79 | 73.40 | 72.83 | 73.59 | 74.83 | 75.08 | 75.74 | 75.55 | 76.81 | 76.96 | 77.17 | 75.33 | 73.28 | 77.29 | 78.12 | 79.10 | 79.24 |
| Kyzylorda | 68.98 | 69.91 | 69.92 | 69.88 | 70.50 | 71.54 | 71.05 | 70.78 | 71.42 | 71.78 | 72.09 | 72.65 | 73.39 | 73.59 | 74.63 | 75.02 | 75.89 | 75.66 | 76.53 | 76.86 | 76.69 | 74.27 | 74.48 | 78.14 | 78.10 | 79.30 | 78.84 |
| Mangystau | 70.07 | 70.32 | 69.83 | 70.18 | 71.19 | 71.68 | 71.79 | 72.01 | 72.49 | 72.02 | 74.05 | 74.27 | 74.37 | 75.41 | 75.82 | 76.99 | 77.25 | 77.78 | 77.87 | 77.98 | 78.21 | 75.17 | 74.70 | 79.44 | 79.90 | 79.45 | 79.86 |
| Pavlodar | 70.62 | 70.87 | 71.18 | 71.51 | 72.05 | 71.79 | 71.91 | 71.51 | 72.61 | 72.26 | 73.41 | 73.34 | 73.57 | 74.20 | 75.06 | 75.20 | 76.20 | 76.34 | 76.58 | 77.33 | 77.38 | 75.48 | 72.98 | 77.49 | 78.71 | 78.06 | 79.11 |
| North Kazakhstan | 71.05 | 71.11 | 71.34 | 71.28 | 70.70 | 70.93 | 70.94 | 71.19 | 71.25 | 72.03 | 72.43 | 72.53 | 72.48 | 72.84 | 74.01 | 75.06 | 75.26 | 75.77 | 75.88 | 76.23 | 76.10 | 74.98 | 73.22 | 76.45 | 78.10 | 78.68 | 77.99 |
| Turkistan | 71.40 | 71.61 | 71.75 | 71.38 | 71.63 | 72.74 | 71.99 | 72.15 | 72.29 | 72.19 | 72.97 | 73.15 | 73.74 | 73.91 | 74.69 | 75.03 | 75.12 | 75.45 | 75.79 | 76.57 | 76.28 | 74.32 | 73.85 | 78.12 | 78.34 | 78.90 | 78.76 |
| Ulytau | Part of Karaganda until 2022 | | | | | | | | | | | | | | | | | | | | | | | 75.52 | 76.95 | 77.07 | 77.86 |
| East Kazakhstan | 70.65 | 71.00 | 71.24 | 71.73 | 71.33 | 71.69 | 71.04 | 71.29 | 71.71 | 71.73 | 72.34 | 72.24 | 72.98 | 73.59 | 74.81 | 75.00 | 75.56 | 76.24 | 76.42 | 76.50 | 76.96 | 75.48 | 73.73 | 77.53 | 78.00 | 78.49 | 78.54 |
| Astana city | 72.77 | 73.80 | 73.88 | 74.20 | 75.36 | 75.64 | 75.82 | 76.12 | 77.13 | 78.18 | 76.66 | 77.01 | 77.83 | 77.75 | 77.78 | 78.84 | 78.54 | 78.65 | 80.14 | 80.50 | 80.95 | 77.50 | 76.17 | 80.59 | 81.30 | 81.68 | 81.57 |
| Almaty city | 73.57 | 73.47 | 73.64 | 73.96 | 73.62 | 74.19 | 73.82 | 74.97 | 75.50 | 75.20 | 75.76 | 75.49 | 76.19 | 76.79 | 77.78 | 78.32 | 79.21 | 79.26 | 79.34 | 78.83 | 79.25 | 78.08 | 75.18 | 80.86 | 81.43 | 81.82 | 81.80 |
| Shymkent city | Part of Turkistan until 2018 | | | | | | | | | | | | | | | | | | 77.45 | 78.10 | 77.77 | 74.67 | 73.21 | 78.82 | 79.59 | 80.63 | 80.71 |

== See also ==
- List of Asian countries by life expectancy
- Demographics of Kazakhstan
