= List of federal subjects of Russia by life expectancy =

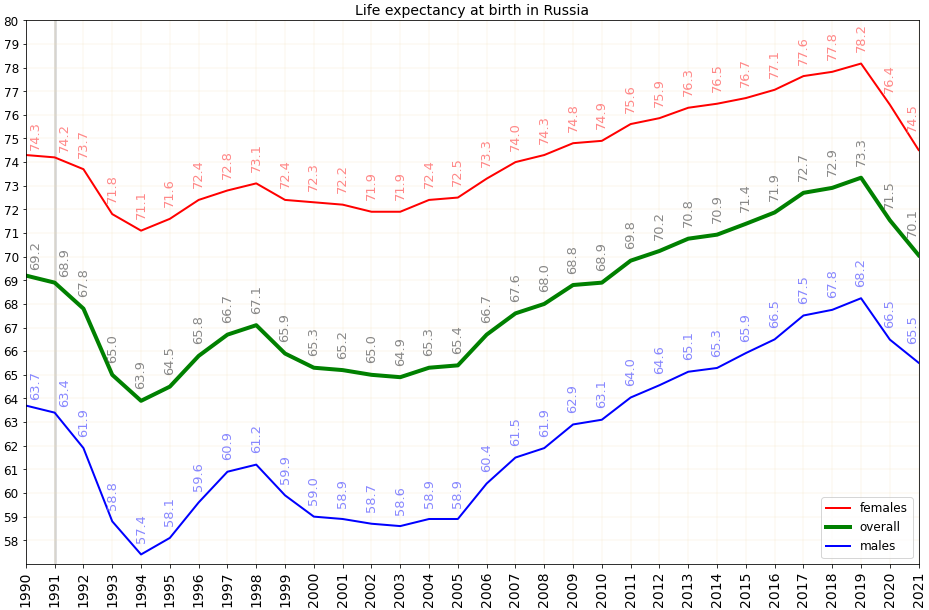
Graph of change of life expectancy in Russia 1990–2021

Life expectancy in Russia is 70.06 years, according to official data for 2021. Russia's historical maximum life expectancy was 73.3 years, achieved in 2019. Life expectancy decreased by 1.8 years in 2020 and a further 1.48 years in 2021, due largely to the effect of the COVID-19 pandemic on Russia's aging society. There have been significant regional differences in COVID-19's impact on life expectancy, with this indicator decreasing by 2.42 years in Voronezh Oblast while simultaneously increasing by 0.89 years in Chechnya during this period.

Duration of life in Russia varies greatly between regions. Russians in the predominantly Muslim, abstinent North Caucasus and in cities of federal importance have relatively high life expectancies, and Ingushetia is considered a "blue zone" due to its especially promising statistics. Life expectancy is relatively low in many regions of the Russian Far East, and as of 2022 Chukotka has the lowest life expectancy in Russia.

On average, Russians in towns live slightly longer than those in rural areas. However, in some regions the opposite pattern is observed, or scales in different years leans on different sides.

Annual estimates of life expectancy are provided by the World Health Organization. According to the WHO, healthy life expectancy (HALE) in Russia in 2019 was 63.72 years: 60.41 for men and 66.84 for women. Also according to the WHO, Russia, Ukraine and Belarus exhibit the world's highest difference in life expectancy between women and men.

In 2024, the federal authorities of Russia set a goal to increase life expectancy in the country to 78 years by 2030 and to 81 years by 2036, including an outpacing increase in healthy life expectancy.

== Official Russian data 2021 ==
List of the federal subjects of Russia by life expectancy provided by the Russian statistical agency Rosstat in 2022. In the last years Rosstat publishes data about life expectancy one time in two years, so the next release of official Russian data is expected in 2024.

=== by federal subject ===
federal subject	2021							historical data											population in 2021 (thsnd.)
federal subject	overall	males	females	F Δ M	urban	rural	urban Δ rural	1991	1991 →2000	2000	2000 →2014	2014	2014 →2019	2019	2019 →2020	2020	2020 →2021	2021	population in 2021 (thsnd.)
Russia on average	70.06	65.51	74.51	9.00	70.30	69.31	0.99	68.9	−3.6	65.3	5.63	70.93	2.41	73.34	−1.80	71.54	−1.48	70.06	145864
Ingushetia	80.52	77.26	83.29	6.03	81.67	79.24	2.43	—	—	72.0	7.42	79.42	3.98	83.40	−1.92	81.48	−0.96	80.52	520
Dagestan	76.59	74.07	78.96	4.89	77.07	76.05	1.02	72.6	−1.6	71.0	4.83	75.83	3.27	79.10	−2.67	76.43	0.16	76.59	3144
Moscow	74.55	71.00	77.94	6.94	74.65	68.55	6.10	69.8	−0.0	69.8	6.90	76.70	1.66	78.36	−2.16	76.20	−1.65	74.55	12645
Kabardino-Balkaria	73.77	69.91	77.32	7.41	74.10	73.36	0.74	70.5	−1.4	69.1	5.06	74.16	2.30	76.46	−2.09	74.37	−0.60	73.77	870
Karachay-Cherkessia	73.47	69.28	77.35	8.07	73.42	73.48	−0.06	71.9	−3.5	68.4	5.51	73.91	2.30	76.21	−1.39	74.82	−1.35	73.47	465
Chechnya	73.00	70.53	75.28	4.75	66.41	79.96	−13.55	69.8	—	—	—	73.06	2.82	75.88	−3.77	72.11	0.89	73.00	1507
Saint Petersburg	72.51	68.23	76.30	8.07	72.51	—	—	69.5	−2.8	66.7	7.87	74.57	1.74	76.31	−2.32	73.99	−1.48	72.51	5381
North Ossetia	72.47	68.08	76.46	8.38	72.19	73.02	−0.83	70.5	−2.1	68.4	5.42	73.82	1.93	75.75	−1.67	74.08	−1.61	72.47	691
Sevastopol	72.25	67.87	76.43	8.56	72.13	73.90	−1.77	—	—	—	—	72.28	1.25	73.53	0.05	73.58	−1.33	72.25	516
Khanty-Mansi AO (Tyumen Oblast)	72.01	68.34	75.56	7.22	72.19	69.73	2.46	—	—	65.9	6.37	72.27	2.77	75.04	−2.17	72.87	−0.86	72.01	1695
Yamalo-Nenets AO (Tyumen Oblast)	71.70	68.05	75.37	7.32	72.52	67.20	5.32	—	—	66.7	5.22	71.92	2.26	74.18	−2.27	71.91	−0.21	71.70	550
Stavropol Krai	71.66	67.68	75.43	7.75	72.20	70.89	1.31	69.3	−1.3	68.0	4.75	72.75	1.91	74.66	−1.46	73.20	−1.54	71.66	2786
Kalmykia	71.40	67.26	75.42	8.16	71.49	71.38	0.11	68.0	−2.6	65.4	6.63	72.03	2.81	74.84	−1.91	72.93	−1.53	71.40	269
Tatarstan	71.28	66.53	75.86	9.33	71.35	70.86	0.49	70.6	−3.0	67.6	4.57	72.17	2.86	75.03	−2.42	72.61	−1.33	71.28	3890
Adygea	71.22	66.62	75.78	9.16	71.85	70.67	1.18	68.3	−0.7	67.6	4.41	72.01	1.84	73.85	−0.58	73.27	−2.05	71.22	466
Kaliningrad Oblast	70.99	66.51	75.25	8.74	71.27	70.14	1.13	68.5	−4.9	63.6	6.68	70.28	3.28	73.56	−0.63	72.93	−1.94	70.99	1023
Belgorod Oblast	70.67	66.54	74.66	8.12	70.78	70.30	0.48	69.8	−1.7	68.1	4.15	72.25	1.96	74.21	−1.84	72.37	−1.70	70.67	1537
Krasnodar Krai	70.53	66.08	74.90	8.82	70.27	70.88	−0.61	68.3	−1.2	67.1	5.18	72.28	1.63	73.91	−1.67	72.24	−1.71	70.53	5686
Moscow Oblast	70.35	65.73	74.80	9.07	70.08	71.70	−1.62	69.4	−4.0	65.4	5.54	70.94	2.92	73.86	−2.19	71.67	−1.32	70.35	7739
Mordovia	70.24	66.17	74.28	8.11	70.40	69.70	0.70	70.3	−3.4	66.9	4.48	71.38	2.57	73.95	−2.35	71.60	−1.36	70.24	775
Leningrad Oblast	70.17	65.43	74.94	9.51	69.36	72.07	−2.71	67.9	−4.9	63.0	7.28	70.28	3.36	73.64	−2.11	71.53	−1.36	70.17	1902
Tyumen Oblast (except two AO)	70.14	65.43	74.88	9.45	70.98	68.36	2.62	—	—	—	—	70.32	2.43	72.75	−1.41	71.34	−1.20	70.14	1548
Chuvashia	69.99	64.84	75.35	10.51	70.63	68.36	2.27	70.0	−3.6	66.4	4.22	70.62	2.82	73.44	−2.41	71.03	−1.04	69.99	1203
Udmurtia	69.99	64.55	75.39	10.84	70.37	69.05	1.32	69.3	−3.5	65.8	4.23	70.03	2.77	72.80	−1.77	71.03	−1.04	69.99	1489
Sakha (Yakutia)	69.98	65.65	74.47	8.82	70.44	68.86	1.58	66.3	−2.6	63.7	6.11	69.81	3.19	73.00	−1.90	71.10	−1.12	69.98	987
Penza Oblast	69.97	65.17	74.75	9.58	70.24	69.30	0.94	70.5	−4.3	66.2	5.43	71.63	1.98	73.61	−2.27	71.34	−1.37	69.97	1282
Volgograd Oblast	69.96	65.70	74.14	8.44	70.24	69.00	1.24	70.4	−4.0	66.4	5.22	71.62	2.45	74.07	−2.09	71.98	−2.02	69.96	2462
Astrakhan Oblast	69.90	65.86	73.87	8.01	69.63	70.43	−0.80	69.1	−3.8	65.3	5.46	70.76	3.10	73.86	−1.85	72.01	−2.11	69.90	994
Tambov Oblast	69.88	65.41	74.33	8.92	69.94	69.72	0.22	68.2	−3.2	65.0	6.11	71.11	2.45	73.56	−1.78	71.78	−1.90	69.88	988
Rostov Oblast	69.79	65.80	73.67	7.87	69.89	69.53	0.36	69.0	−2.5	66.5	4.80	71.30	2.39	73.69	−1.65	72.04	−2.25	69.79	4168
Kirov Oblast	69.73	64.80	74.68	9.88	70.29	66.45	3.84	69.0	−3.3	65.7	4.89	70.59	2.37	72.96	−1.54	71.42	−1.69	69.73	1242
Republic of Crimea	69.70	65.31	73.96	8.65	69.09	70.35	−1.26	—	—	—	—	70.74	1.97	72.71	−1.51	71.20	−1.50	69.70	1899
Tomsk Oblast	69.70	65.03	74.36	9.33	70.47	67.63	2.84	69.2	−4.3	64.9	5.77	70.67	2.18	72.85	−1.68	71.17	−1.47	69.70	1069
Arkhangelsk Oblast (except AO)	69.60	64.33	75.08	10.75	70.43	65.62	4.81	—	—	—	—	70.20	2.10	72.30	−0.91	71.39	−1.79	69.60	1076
Voronezh Oblast	69.49	64.74	74.26	9.52	69.34	69.77	−0.43	69.7	−3.2	66.5	4.32	70.82	2.81	73.63	−1.72	71.91	−2.42	69.49	2297
Bashkortostan	69.49	64.85	74.19	9.34	70.24	68.04	2.20	70.0	−3.3	66.7	3.06	69.76	2.88	72.64	−2.28	70.36	−0.87	69.49	4008
Mari El	69.46	63.99	75.17	11.18	70.17	67.95	2.22	68.7	−4.1	64.6	4.82	69.42	3.48	72.90	−1.85	71.05	−1.59	69.46	673
Nenets AO (Arkhangelsk Oblast)	69.39	64.18	75.01	10.83	71.84	62.49	9.35	—	—	60.6	10.05	70.65	2.54	73.19	−2.79	70.40	−1.01	69.39	44
Samara Oblast	69.33	64.62	73.86	9.24	69.31	69.38	−0.07	69.5	−5.0	64.5	5.13	69.63	3.14	72.77	−2.32	70.45	−1.12	69.33	3143
Novosibirsk Oblast	69.19	64.37	73.98	9.61	69.70	67.10	2.60	68.9	−2.6	66.3	3.98	70.28	1.97	72.25	−1.93	70.32	−1.13	69.19	2783
Kaluga Oblast	69.16	64.31	74.12	9.81	68.88	70.16	−1.28	69.3	−5.0	64.3	5.63	69.93	2.42	72.35	−1.97	70.38	−1.22	69.16	1007
Chelyabinsk Oblast	69.16	64.36	73.79	9.43	69.50	67.46	2.04	69.8	−5.1	64.7	5.01	69.71	2.37	72.08	−1.79	70.29	−1.13	69.16	3431
Saratov Oblast	69.08	64.84	73.18	8.34	69.26	68.45	0.81	69.5	−4.5	65.0	5.95	70.95	2.12	73.07	−1.93	71.14	−2.06	69.08	2378
Vologda Oblast	69.08	63.85	74.38	10.53	69.47	67.85	1.62	69.0	−3.3	65.7	4.04	69.74	2.08	71.82	−1.11	70.71	−1.63	69.08	1145
Yaroslavl Oblast	69.07	63.78	74.25	10.47	69.08	68.92	0.16	69.0	−3.8	65.2	5.44	70.64	2.28	72.92	−1.98	70.94	−1.87	69.07	1234
Ulyanovsk Oblast	69.05	64.21	73.90	9.69	69.20	68.32	0.88	69.5	−3.6	65.9	4.47	70.37	2.59	72.96	−1.98	70.98	−1.93	69.05	1211
Ivanovo Oblast	69.02	64.03	73.86	9.83	68.85	69.68	−0.83	68.1	−5.5	62.6	7.28	69.88	1.96	71.84	−1.18	70.66	−1.64	69.02	982
Omsk Oblast	69.02	64.48	73.45	8.97	69.56	67.36	2.20	69.4	−3.2	66.2	3.93	70.13	2.19	72.32	−2.00	70.32	−1.30	69.02	1892
Tula Oblast	68.97	64.05	73.85	9.80	68.53	70.46	−1.93	68.5	−5.4	63.1	6.53	69.63	2.58	72.21	−2.01	70.20	−1.23	68.97	1441
Oryol Oblast	68.97	64.04	73.81	9.77	69.32	68.19	1.13	68.8	−3.2	65.6	4.28	69.88	2.68	72.56	−2.46	70.10	−1.13	68.97	719
Nizhny Novgorod Oblast	68.93	63.81	73.97	10.16	68.90	68.98	−0.08	69.8	−4.7	65.1	4.43	69.53	2.79	72.32	−1.99	70.33	−1.40	68.93	3160
Buryatia	68.91	64.09	73.78	9.69	70.03	67.21	2.82	66.8	−4.1	62.7	5.84	68.54	2.23	70.77	−0.48	70.29	−1.38	68.91	984
Sverdlovsk Oblast	68.79	63.72	73.80	10.08	69.03	67.30	1.73	68.8	−5.1	63.7	6.06	69.76	2.05	71.81	−1.66	70.15	−1.36	68.79	4277
Kostroma Oblast	68.78	64.07	73.50	9.43	69.02	67.79	1.23	68.2	−4.2	64.0	6.05	70.05	2.30	72.35	−1.43	70.92	−2.14	68.78	625
Bryansk Oblast	68.67	63.57	73.88	10.31	68.70	68.56	0.14	69.3	−4.6	64.7	4.72	69.42	2.89	72.31	−1.68	70.63	−1.96	68.67	1176
Ryazan Oblast	68.61	63.96	73.31	9.35	68.40	68.98	−0.58	69.2	−4.3	64.9	5.90	70.80	2.40	73.20	−2.25	70.95	−2.34	68.61	1092
Primorsky Krai	68.61	63.98	73.45	9.47	69.28	66.28	3.00	66.8	−3.1	63.7	5.04	68.74	1.80	70.54	−0.99	69.55	−0.94	68.61	1870
Altai Krai	68.60	64.08	73.10	9.02	69.21	67.49	1.72	68.4	−1.8	66.6	3.41	70.01	1.60	71.61	−1.42	70.19	−1.59	68.60	2282
Lipetsk Oblast	68.58	63.89	73.30	9.41	68.78	68.12	0.66	69.3	−2.5	66.8	3.80	70.60	2.74	73.34	−2.75	70.59	−2.01	68.58	1121
Kursk Oblast	68.56	64.09	72.94	8.85	69.09	67.12	1.97	68.3	−3.0	65.3	4.81	70.11	2.16	72.27	−1.75	70.52	−1.96	68.56	1090
Perm Krai	68.52	63.48	73.49	10.01	68.95	67.02	1.93	68.1	−4.7	63.4	5.64	69.04	2.28	71.32	−1.73	69.59	−1.07	68.52	2568
Khakassia	68.49	63.74	73.17	9.43	69.15	66.91	2.24	66.7	−3.9	62.8	6.03	68.83	2.22	71.05	−0.99	70.06	−1.57	68.49	530
Sakhalin Oblast	68.42	63.72	73.41	9.69	68.68	66.76	1.92	66.3	−3.0	63.3	4.59	67.89	2.39	70.28	−0.55	69.73	−1.31	68.42	485
Krasnoyarsk Krai	68.35	63.56	73.13	9.57	68.92	66.09	2.83	68.0	−5.5	62.5	6.73	69.23	1.93	71.16	−1.34	69.82	−1.47	68.35	2853
Komi	68.32	63.53	73.13	9.60	69.02	65.16	3.86	67.9	−4.4	63.5	5.55	69.05	2.25	71.30	−1.00	70.30	−1.98	68.32	809
Kurgan Oblast	68.29	63.29	73.48	10.19	68.42	67.95	0.47	68.8	−4.3	64.5	4.25	68.75	2.39	71.14	−1.20	69.94	−1.65	68.29	812
Murmansk Oblast	68.29	63.72	72.85	9.13	68.16	69.97	−1.81	70.4	−5.9	64.5	5.47	69.97	1.78	71.75	−1.94	69.81	−1.52	68.29	729
Orenburg Oblast	68.21	63.91	72.48	8.57	68.40	67.56	0.84	69.5	−4.5	65.0	3.73	68.73	3.31	72.04	−2.31	69.73	−1.52	68.21	1934
Vladimir Oblast	68.11	63.18	73.00	9.82	67.93	68.81	−0.88	69.3	−5.9	63.4	5.85	69.25	2.62	71.87	−1.84	70.03	−1.92	68.11	1333
Kamchatka Krai	68.09	63.76	72.93	9.17	68.87	65.06	3.81	66.9	−3.6	63.3	4.76	68.06	2.51	70.57	−1.30	69.27	−1.18	68.09	312
Smolensk Oblast	68.00	63.28	72.83	9.55	68.29	67.24	1.05	68.5	−5.6	62.9	6.54	69.44	2.45	71.89	−1.79	70.10	−2.10	68.00	915
Tver Oblast	67.87	62.81	73.04	10.23	68.03	67.27	0.76	68.1	−5.6	62.5	5.93	68.43	2.81	71.24	−1.48	69.76	−1.89	67.87	1238
Altai	67.86	62.48	73.35	10.87	69.07	66.98	2.09	65.3	−2.5	62.8	4.96	67.76	2.53	70.29	−1.14	69.15	−1.29	67.86	221
Khabarovsk Krai	67.85	62.91	72.94	10.03	68.25	66.03	2.22	67.2	−4.2	63.0	5.01	68.01	2.04	70.05	−1.44	68.61	−0.76	67.85	1300
Pskov Oblast	67.69	62.85	72.67	9.82	67.63	67.45	0.18	67.6	−5.7	61.9	6.17	68.07	2.58	70.65	−1.52	69.13	−1.44	67.69	617
Novgorod Oblast	67.64	62.48	72.80	10.32	67.27	68.39	−1.12	67.2	−4.4	62.8	5.61	68.41	2.11	70.52	−0.93	69.59	−1.95	67.64	589
Kuzbass	67.61	62.80	72.37	9.57	67.74	66.70	1.04	67.1	−4.4	62.7	5.10	67.80	1.98	69.78	−1.27	68.51	−0.90	67.61	2619
Magadan Oblast	67.41	62.48	72.51	10.03	67.77	59.29	8.48	66.8	−4.8	62.0	5.19	67.19	2.47	69.66	−0.62	69.04	−1.63	67.41	138
Karelia	67.31	62.16	72.54	10.38	68.31	62.49	5.82	68.2	−5.3	62.9	6.46	69.36	2.10	71.46	−1.83	69.63	−2.32	67.31	606
Tuva	66.88	62.65	70.85	8.20	69.13	63.13	6.00	60.9	−5.7	55.2	6.59	61.79	5.78	67.57	−1.32	66.25	0.63	66.88	331
Zabaykalsky Krai	66.82	62.28	71.54	9.26	67.59	64.84	2.75	67.0	−5.5	61.5	5.88	67.38	1.50	68.88	−0.65	68.23	−1.41	66.82	1048
Irkutsk Oblast	66.80	61.90	71.69	9.79	67.12	65.68	1.44	66.2	−5.0	61.2	5.67	66.87	2.68	69.55	−1.30	68.25	−1.45	66.80	2366
Amur Oblast	66.30	61.75	71.11	9.36	67.01	64.63	2.38	67.4	−5.2	62.2	4.80	67.00	1.66	68.66	−1.28	67.38	−1.08	66.30	777
Jewish Autonomous Oblast	66.12	61.73	70.58	8.85	66.14	66.42	−0.28	65.9	−4.1	61.8	3.40	65.20	2.88	68.08	−0.58	67.50	−1.38	66.12	155
Chukotka	64.87	60.55	69.25	8.70	69.88	50.78	19.10	67.2	−7.0	60.2	2.12	62.32	5.77	68.09	−2.27	65.82	−0.95	64.87	50
federal subject	overall	males	females	F Δ M	urban	rural	urban Δ rural	1991	1991 →2000	2000	2000 →2014	2014	2014 →2019	2019	2019 →2020	2020	2020 →2021	2021	population

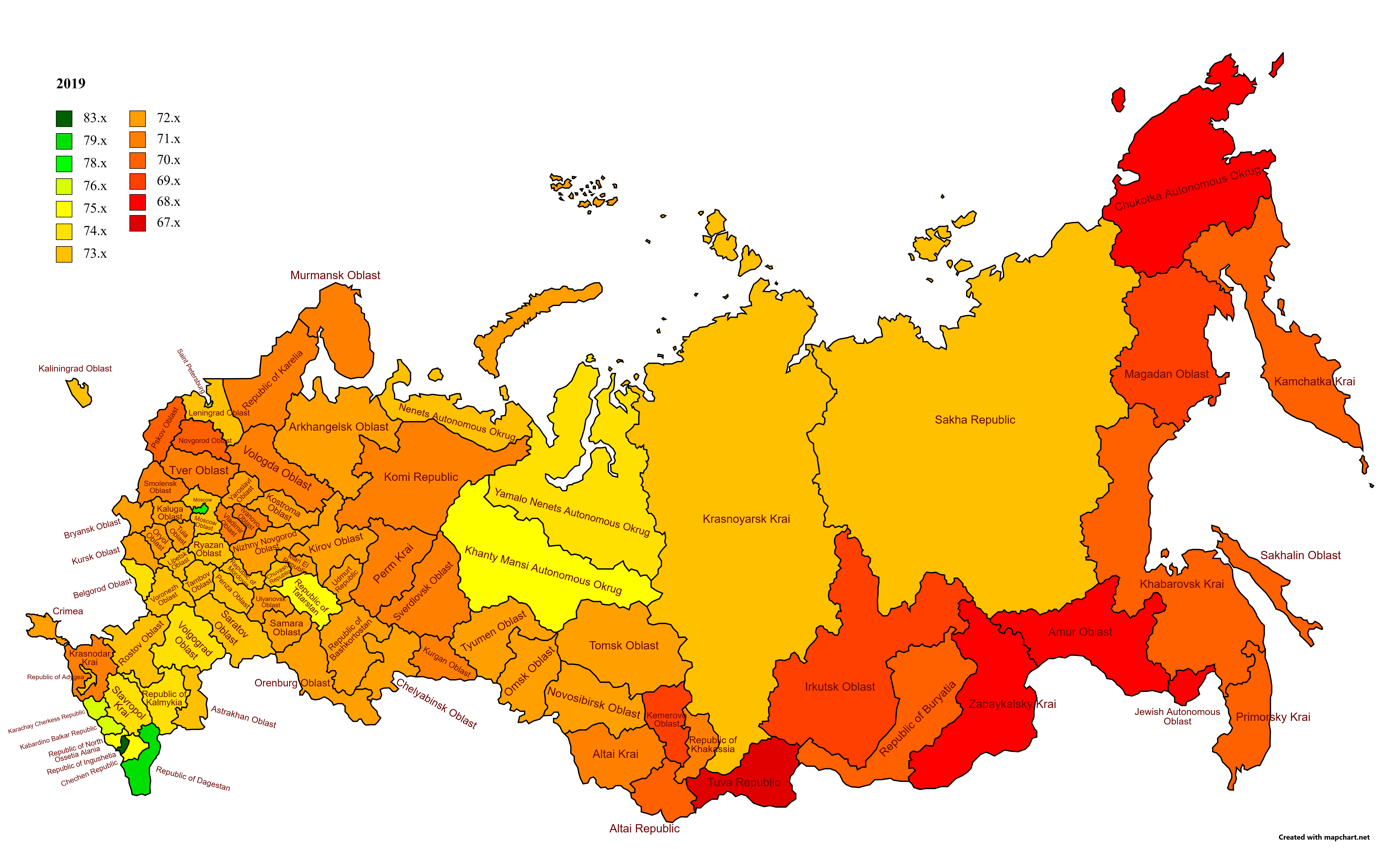
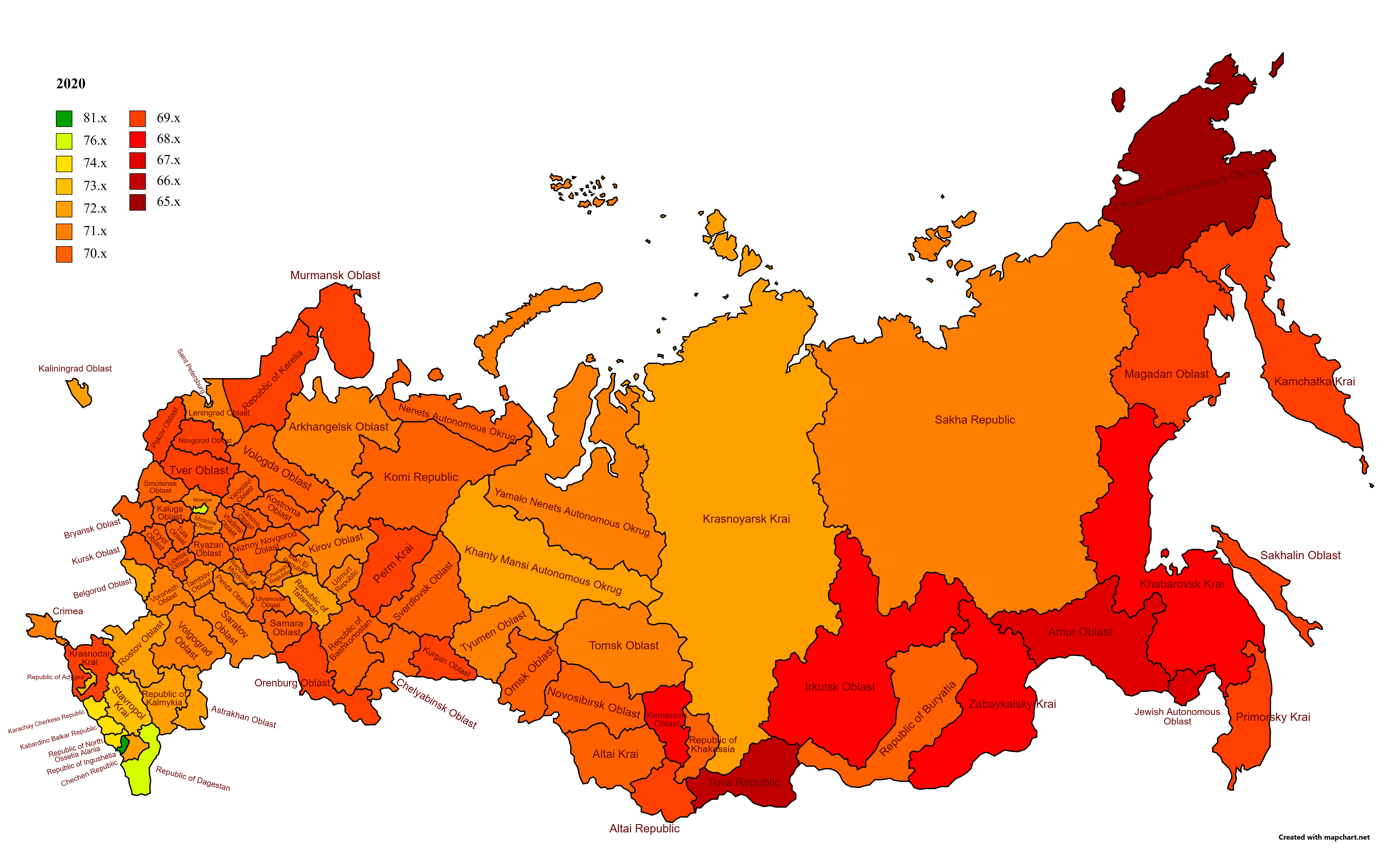
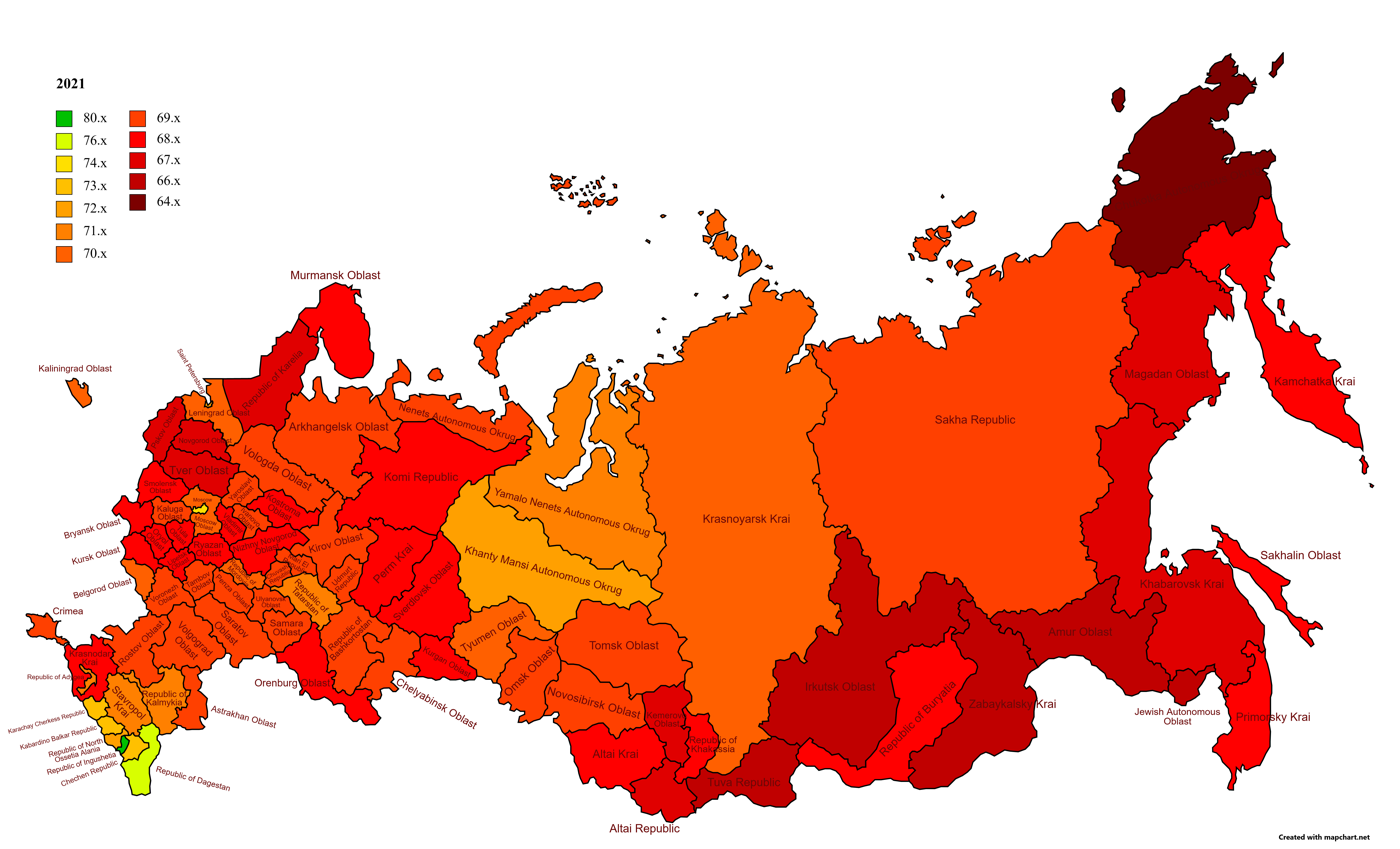
Change in life expectancy in Russia from 2019 to 2021

=== by federal district ===
Life expectancy in federal districts that have undergone boundary changes is shown only after the last change in their configuration.

federal districts	2021							historical data											population in 2021 (thsnd.)
federal districts	overall	males	females	F Δ M	urban	rural	urban Δ rural	1991	1991 →2000	2000	2000 →2014	2014	2014 →2019	2019	2019 →2020	2020	2020 →2021	2021	population in 2021 (thsnd.)
Russia on average	70.06	65.51	74.51	9.00	70.30	69.31	0.99	68.9	−3.6	65.3	5.63	70.93	2.41	73.34	−1.80	71.54	−1.48	70.06	145864
North Caucasian FD	73.79	70.35	76.96	6.61	73.31	74.32	−1.01	—	—	—	—	74.11	2.53	76.64	−2.06	74.58	−0.79	73.79	9982
Central FD	70.85	66.40	75.17	8.77	71.14	69.53	1.61	69.2	−3.1	66.1	6.00	72.10	2.44	74.54	−1.97	72.57	−1.72	70.85	39178
Northwestern FD	70.37	65.63	74.92	9.29	70.67	68.74	1.93	68.9	−4.4	64.5	6.92	71.42	2.30	73.72	−1.70	72.02	−1.65	70.37	13922
Southern FD	70.21	65.94	74.37	8.43	70.14	70.32	−0.18	—	—	—	—	—	—	73.73	−1.64	72.09	−1.88	70.21	16459
Ural FD	69.61	64.87	74.26	9.39	69.97	67.84	2.13	69.0	−4.4	64.6	5.60	70.20	2.32	72.52	−1.71	70.81	−1.20	69.61	12312
Volga FD	69.50	64.72	74.22	9.50	69.77	68.62	1.15	69.6	−4.1	65.5	4.70	70.20	2.74	72.94	−2.11	70.83	−1.33	69.50	28958
Siberian FD	68.30	63.57	73.01	9.44	68.77	66.75	2.02	—	—	—	—	—	—	71.12	−1.52	69.60	−1.30	68.30	16947
Far Eastern FD	68.06	63.42	72.90	9.48	68.71	66.21	2.50	—	—	—	—	—	—	70.22	−1.07	69.15	−1.09	68.06	8108

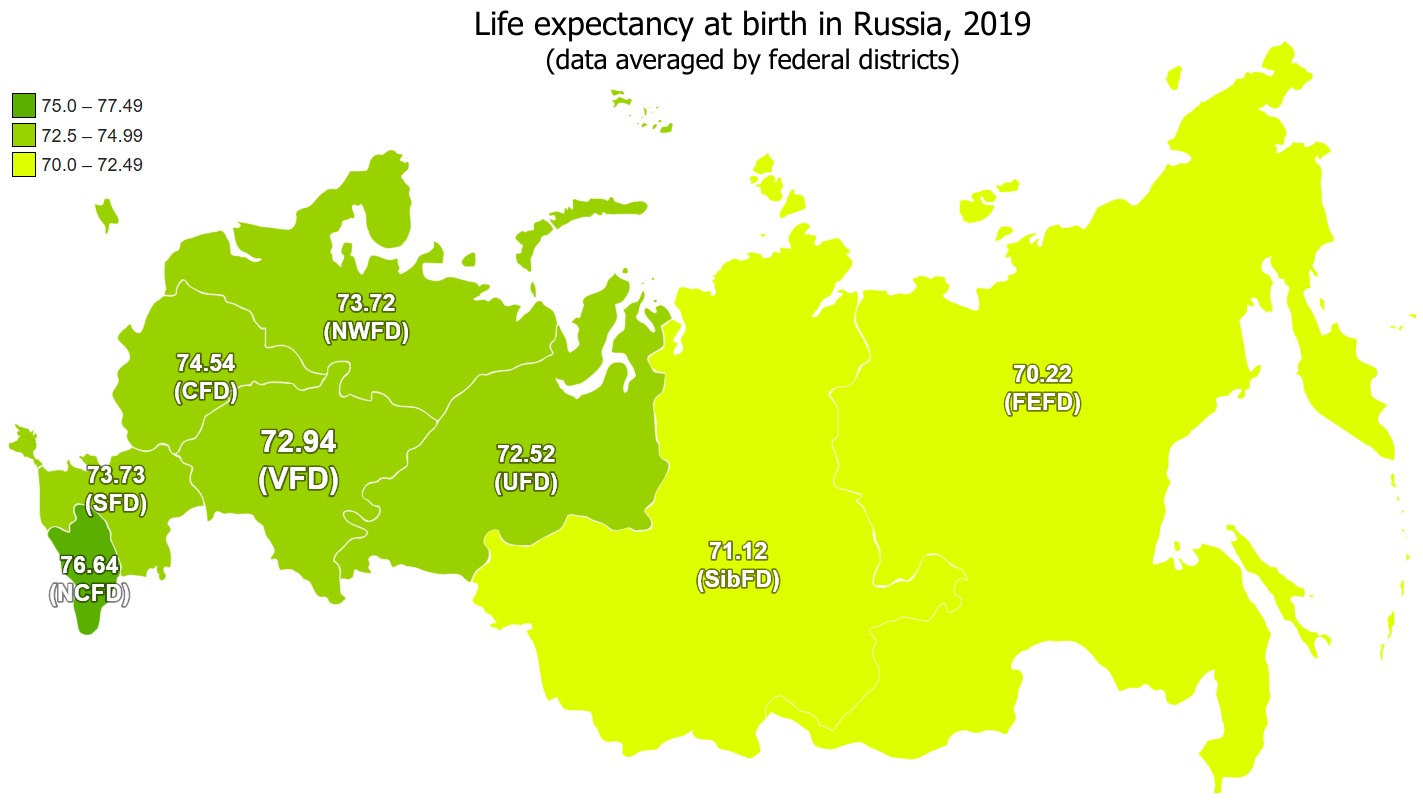
Life expectancy in federal districts in 2019

== Charts and maps ==
=== Charts and maps for Russia ===
Comparison of male and female life expectancy at birth for Russia for 2021.
Open the original svg-file in a separate window and hover over a bubble to highlight it. The squares of bubbles are proportional to population.

A similar chart of life expectancy in urban and rural areas.
Original svg-file
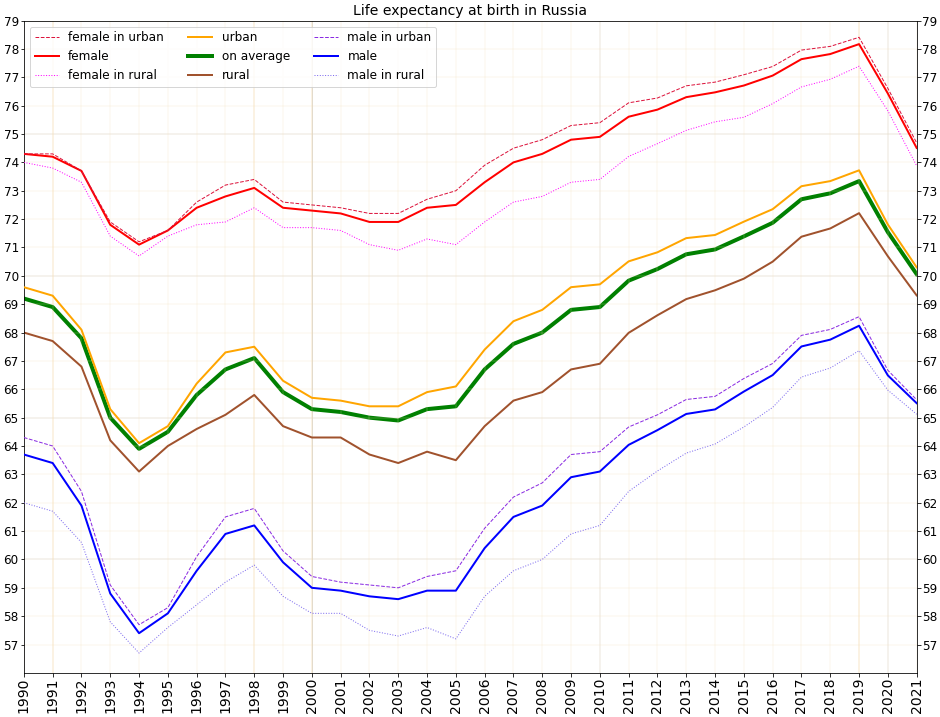
Detailed data about male and female longevity in urban and rural

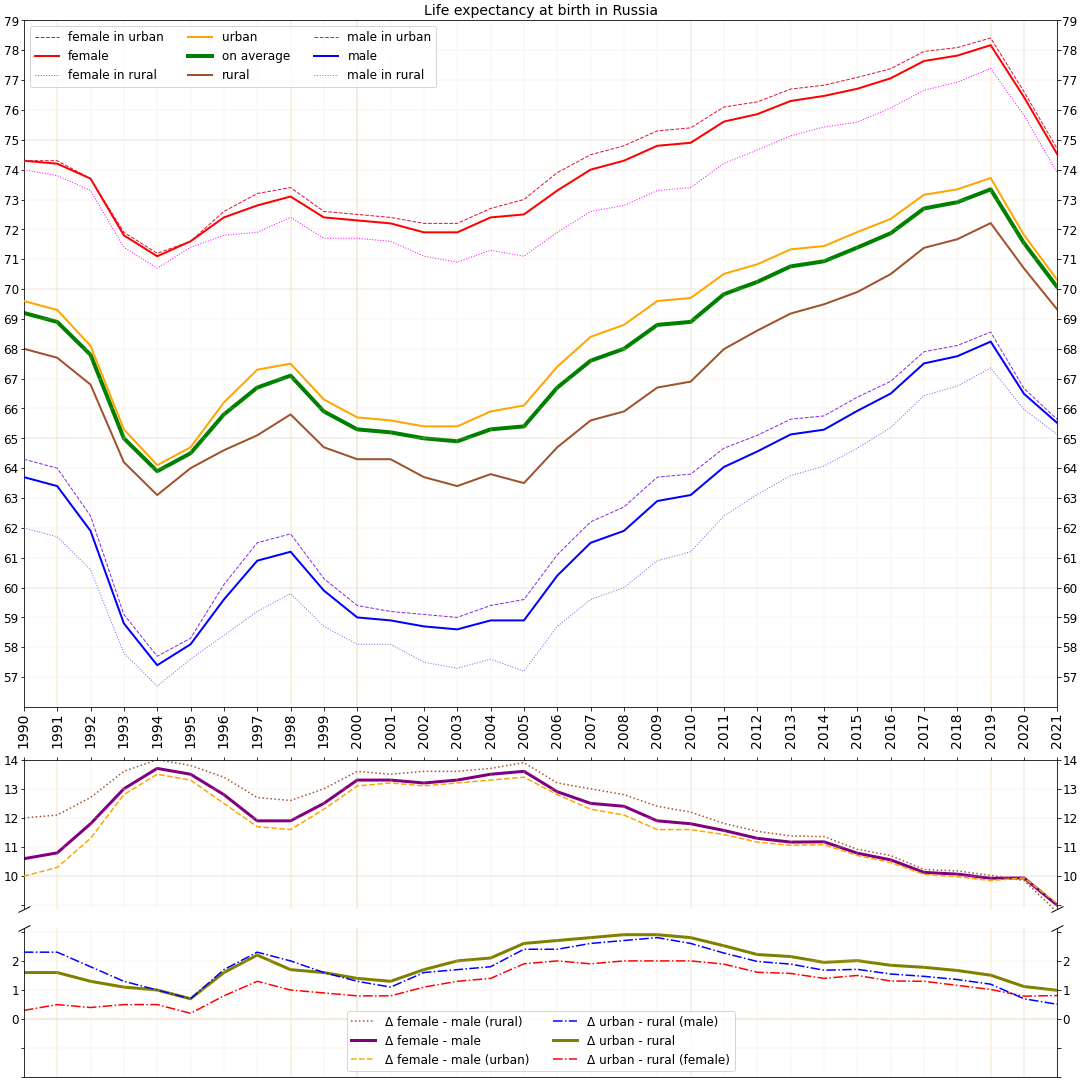
Version of chart with calculated differences

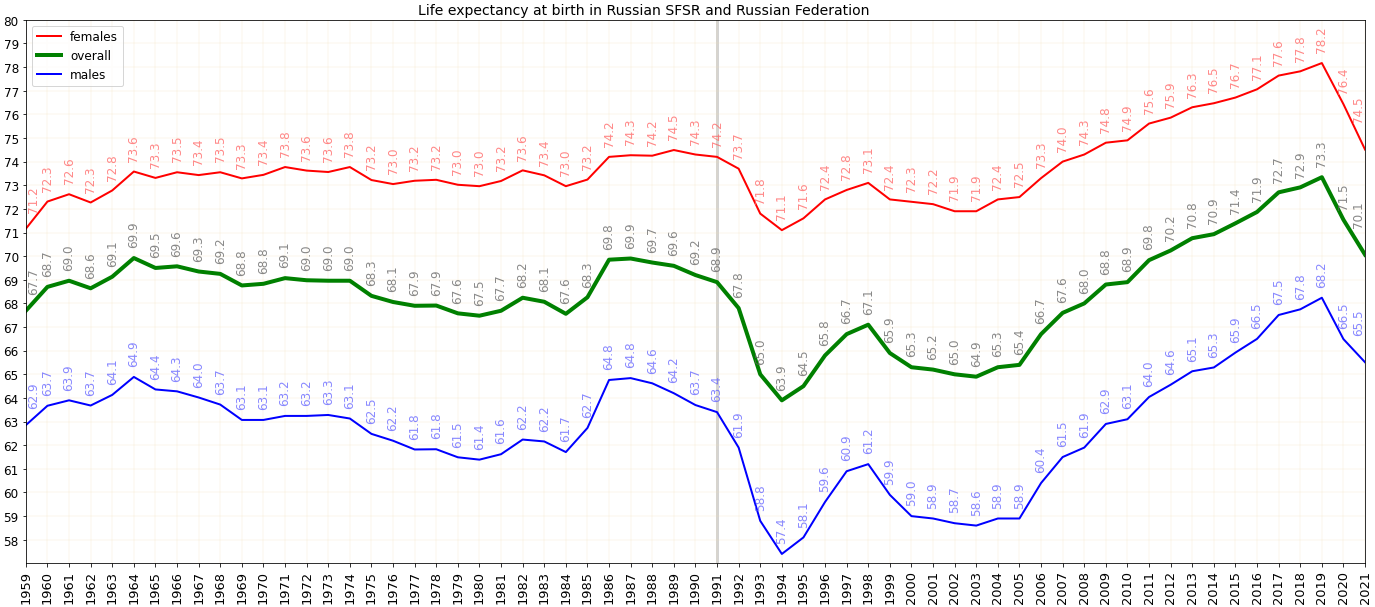
Life expectancy chart for the Russian SFSR and the Russian Federation in 1959–2021

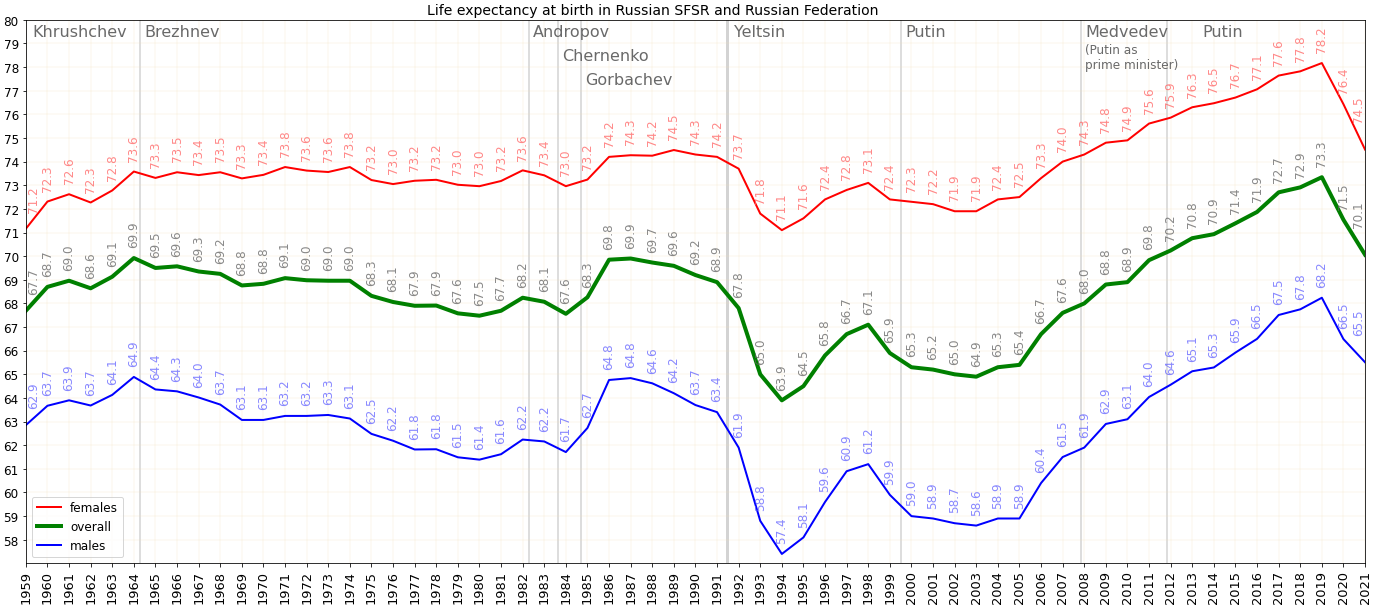
Life expectancy at birth in comparison with leader of the state, 1959–2021

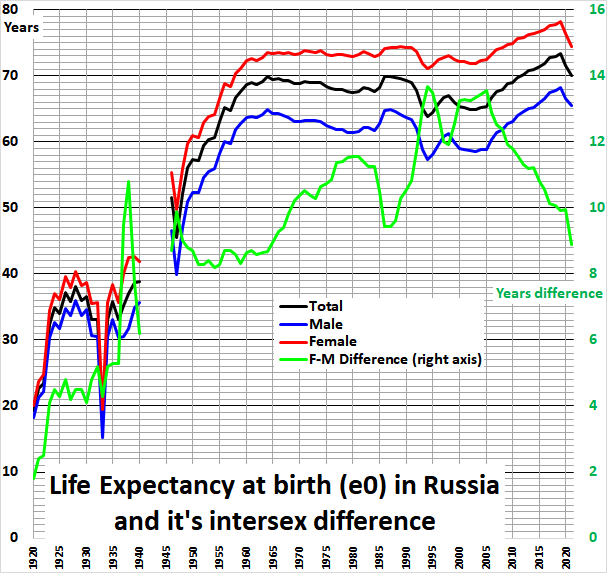
Life expectancy at birth in Russia and its intersex difference, 1920—2021 гг.

Life expectancy in Russia since 1896, according to estimation of "Our World in Data"

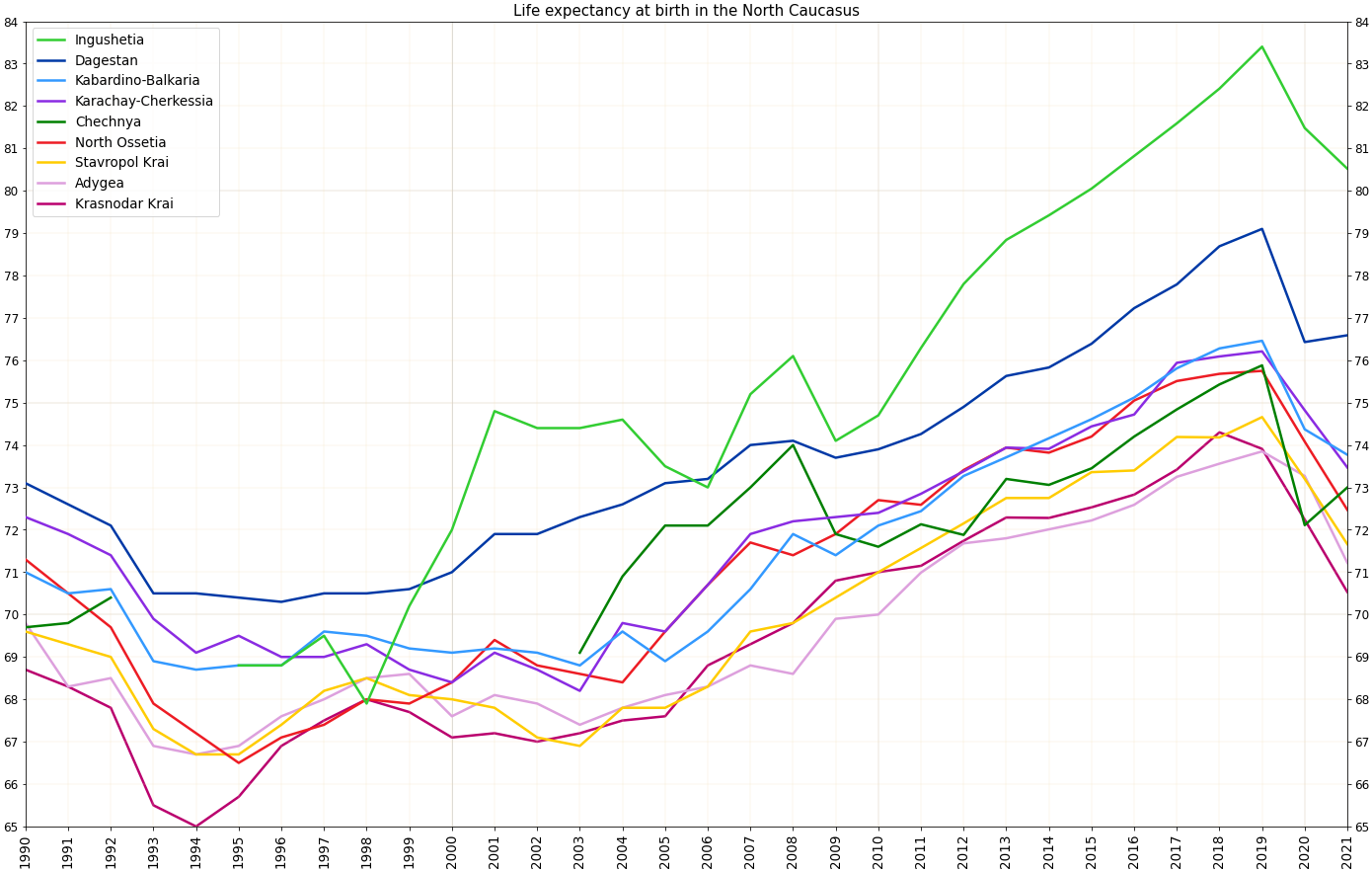
Life expectancy in the North Caucasus

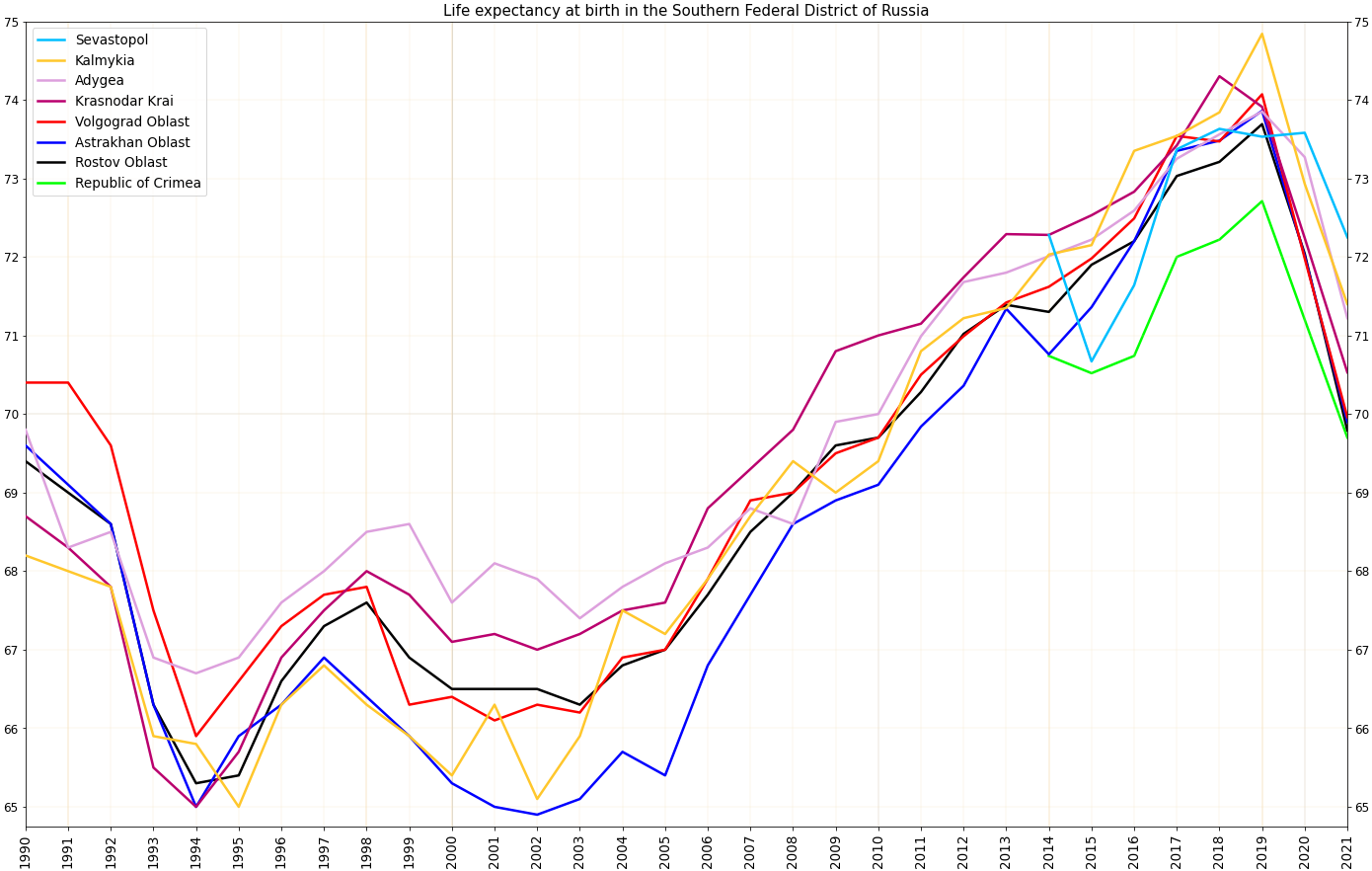
Life expectancy in the Southern Federal District

=== Comparison of Russia with other countries ===
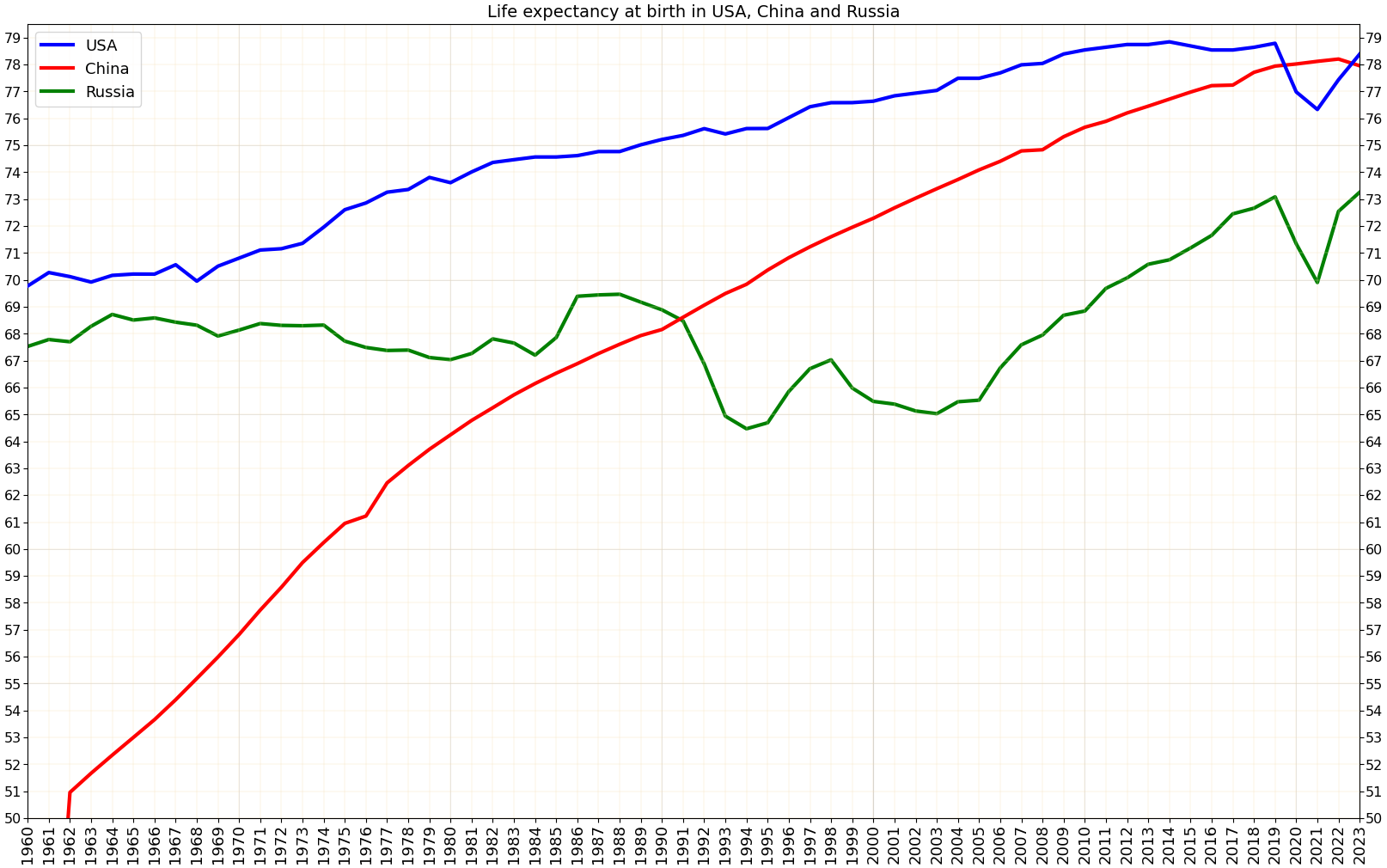
Comparison with the USA and China

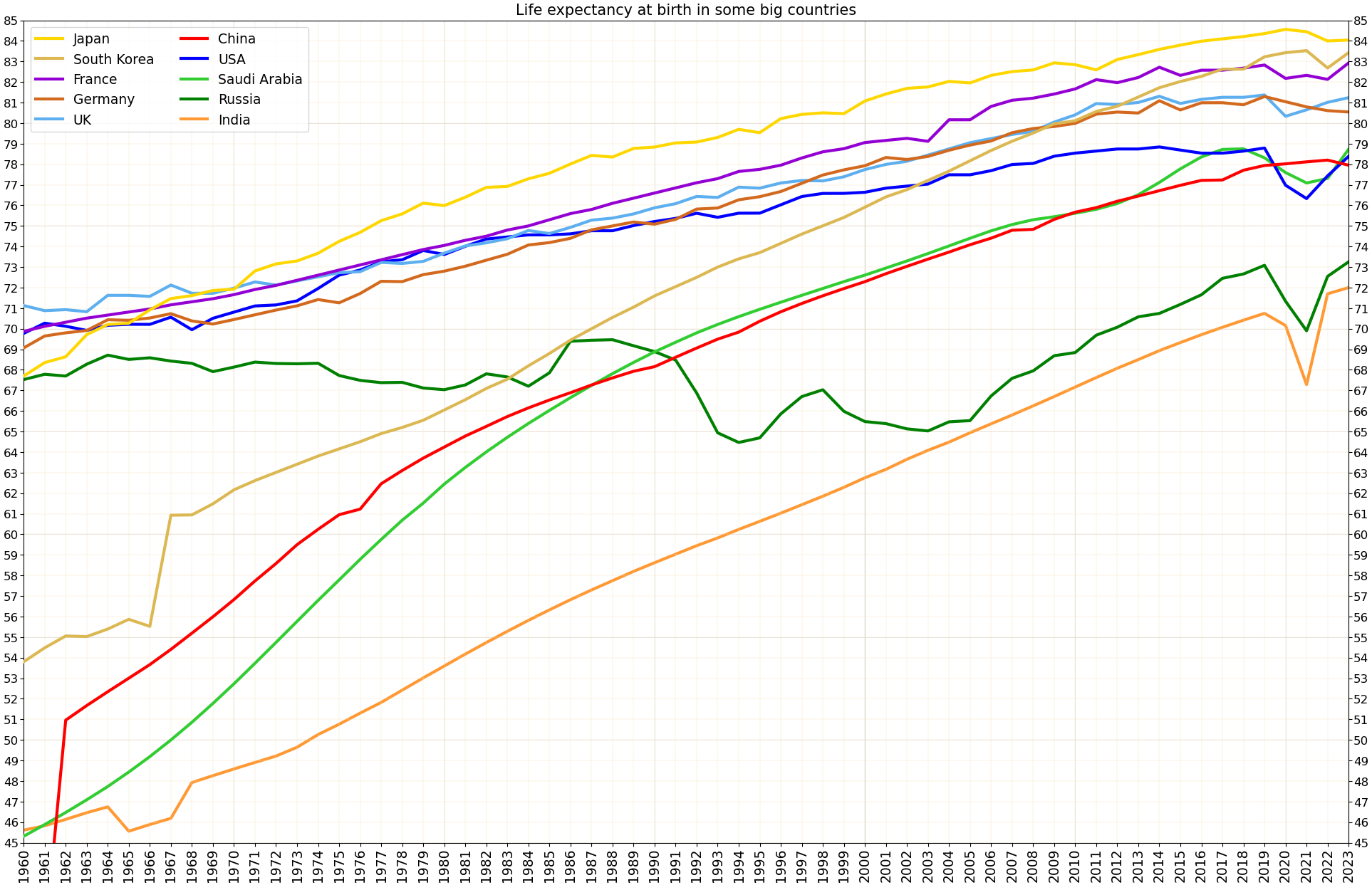
Comparison with biggest countries of the world

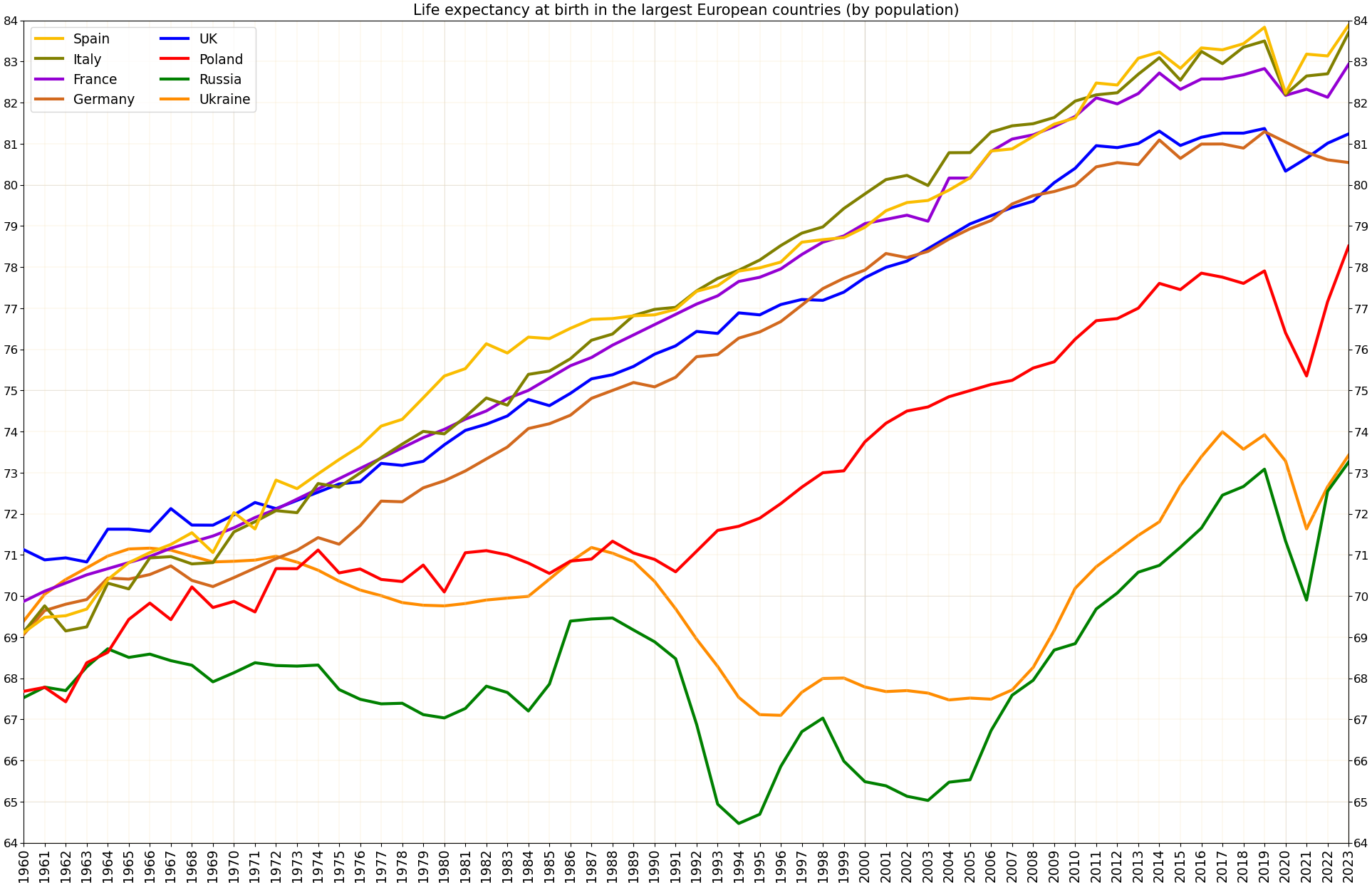
Comparison with biggest European countries

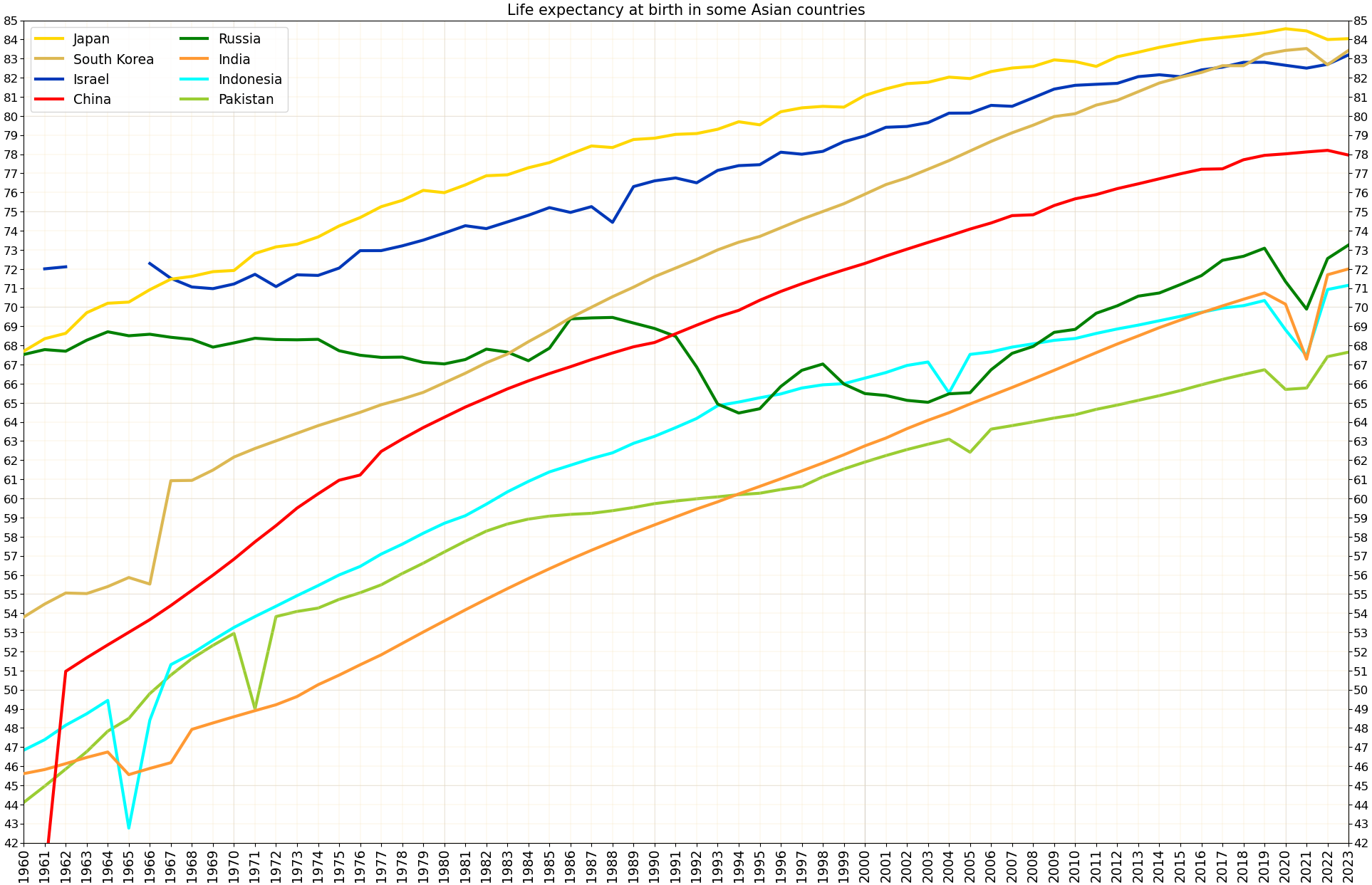
Comparison with biggest Asian countries
Life expectancy and healthy life expectancy in Russia on the background of other countries of the world in 2019

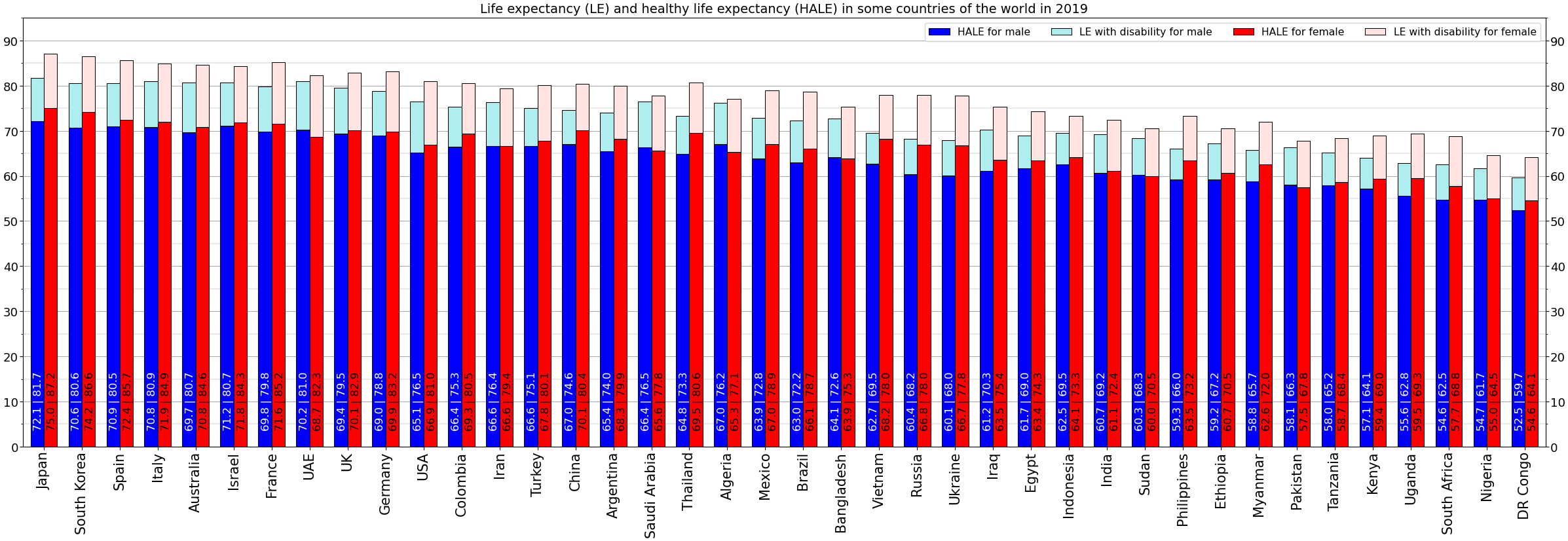
Life expectancy and healthy life expectancy for males and females
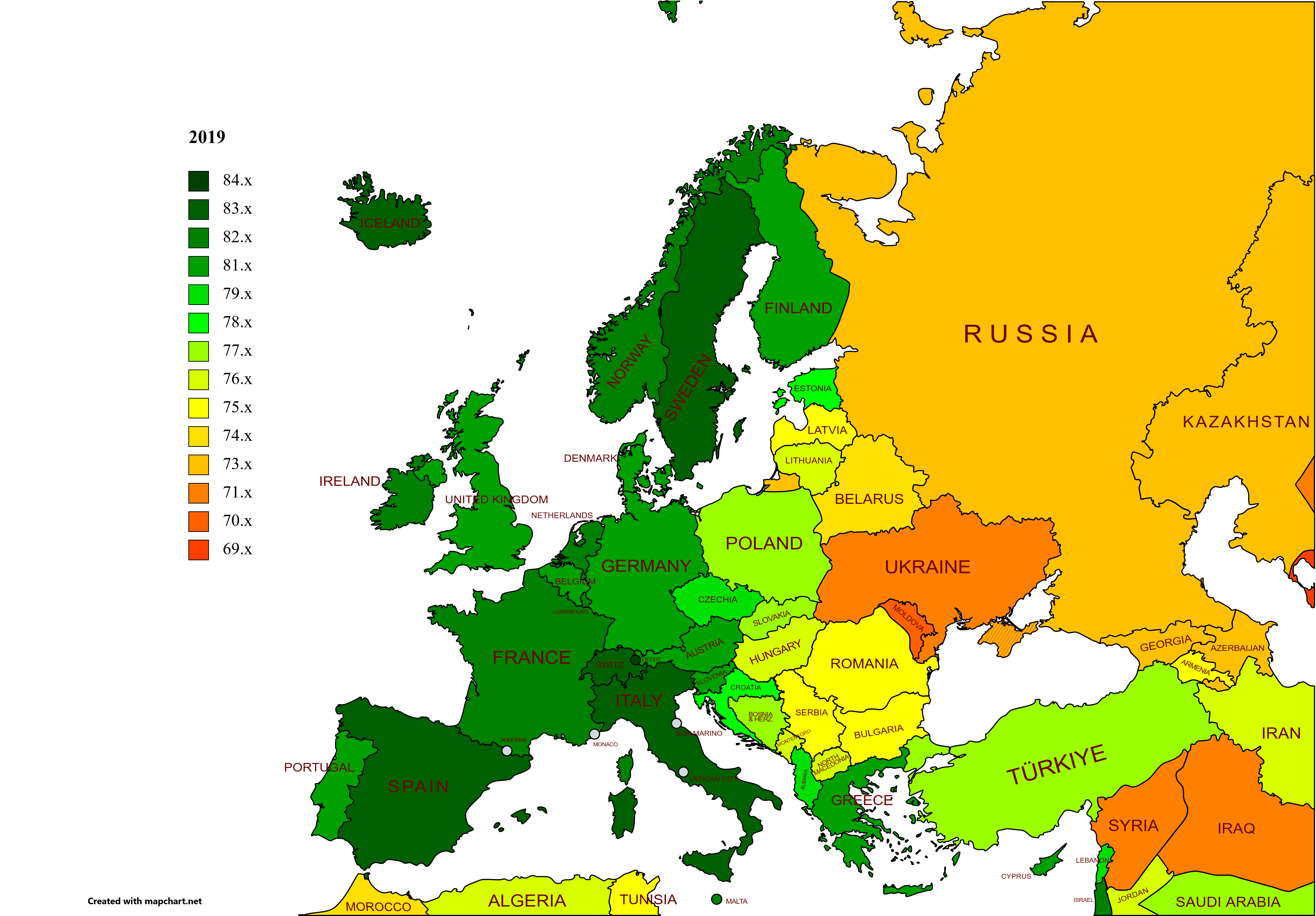
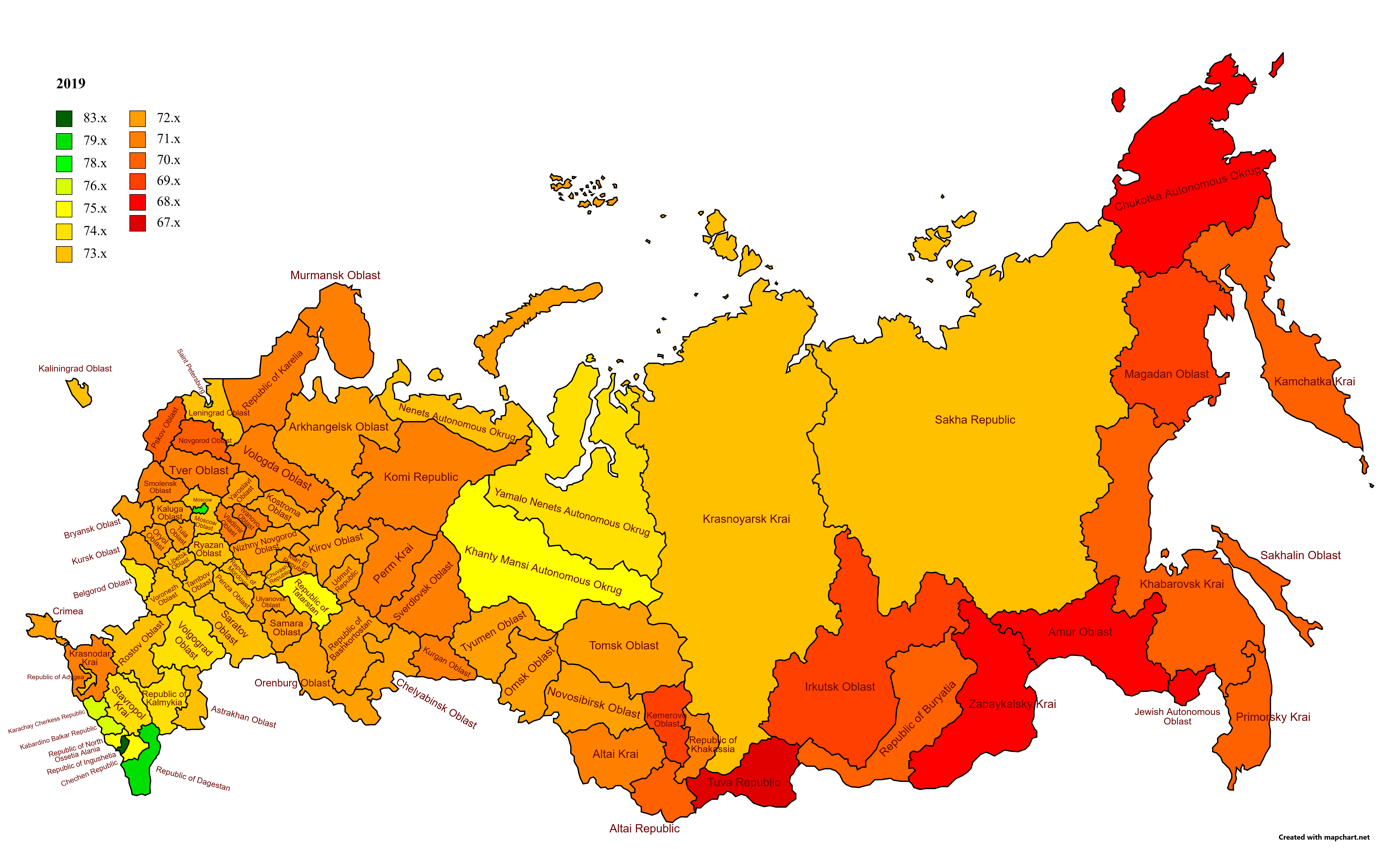
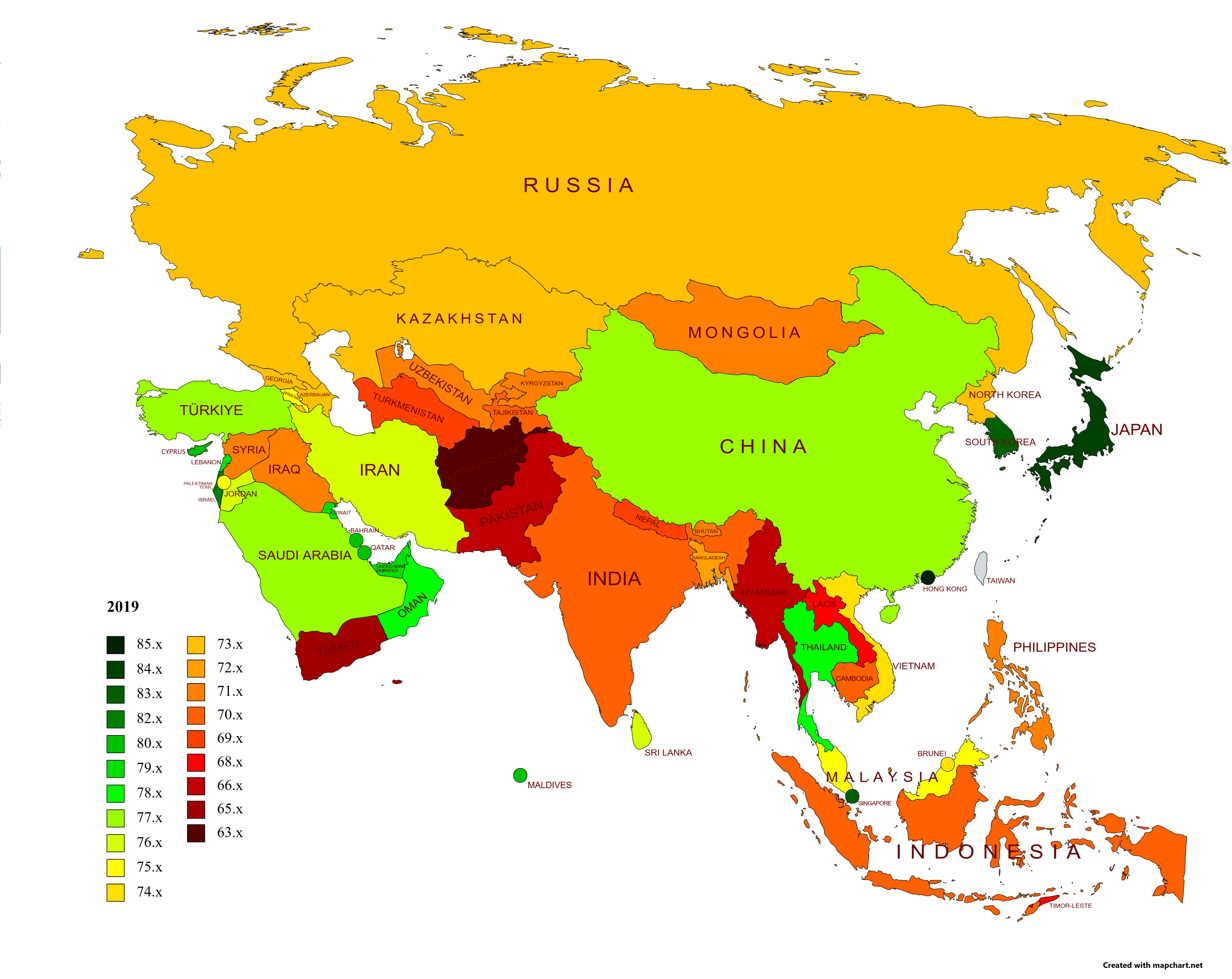
Comparison of life expectancy in subjects of Russia with life expectancy in European and Asian countries in 2019. Legends on the maps are identical. Data of Rosstat and the World Bank Group for Russia is similar, so such rough comparison of their data is suitable.

== Official Russian data 2019 ==
Detailed data for 2019, that was the most successful in terms of longevity, and annual dynamics from 2014 to 2021.

federal subject	2019							historical data														
federal subject	overall	males	females	F Δ M	urban	rural	urban Δ rural	2014	2014 →2015	2015	2015 →2016	2016	2016 →2017	2017	2017 →2018	2018	2018 →2019	2019	2019 →2020	2020	2020 →2021	2021
Russia on average	73.34	68.24	78.17	9.93	73.72	72.21	1.51	70.93	0.46	71.39	0.48	71.87	0.83	72.70	0.21	72.91	0.43	73.34	−1.80	71.54	−1.48	70.06
Ingushetia	83.40	80.00	86.27	6.27	83.40	83.39	0.01	79.42	0.63	80.05	0.77	80.82	0.77	81.59	0.82	82.41	0.99	83.40	−1.92	81.48	−0.96	80.52
Dagestan	79.10	76.62	81.44	4.82	79.85	78.35	1.50	75.83	0.56	76.39	0.84	77.23	0.56	77.79	0.90	78.69	0.41	79.10	−2.67	76.43	0.16	76.59
Moscow	78.36	74.83	81.71	6.88	78.39	75.79	2.60	76.70	0.07	76.77	0.31	77.08	0.79	77.87	−0.03	77.84	0.52	78.36	−2.16	76.20	−1.65	74.55
Kabardino-Balkaria	76.46	72.62	79.94	7.32	76.71	76.19	0.52	74.16	0.45	74.61	0.51	75.12	0.69	75.81	0.47	76.28	0.18	76.46	−2.09	74.37	−0.60	73.77
Saint Petersburg	76.31	71.99	79.99	8.00	76.31	—	—	74.57	−0.15	74.42	0.48	74.90	0.55	75.45	0.48	75.93	0.38	76.31	−2.32	73.99	−1.48	72.51
Karachay-Cherkessia	76.21	71.68	80.40	8.72	76.53	75.90	0.63	73.91	0.53	74.44	0.28	74.72	1.22	75.94	0.15	76.09	0.12	76.21	−1.39	74.82	−1.35	73.47
Chechnya	75.88	73.61	77.97	4.36	73.73	77.07	−3.34	73.06	0.39	73.45	0.75	74.20	0.64	74.84	0.59	75.43	0.45	75.88	−3.77	72.11	0.89	73.00
North Ossetia	75.75	70.52	80.57	10.05	75.87	75.56	0.31	73.82	0.38	74.20	0.85	75.05	0.46	75.51	0.17	75.68	0.07	75.75	−1.67	74.08	−1.61	72.47
Khanty-Mansi AO (Tyumen Oblast)	75.04	70.60	79.28	8.68	75.24	72.59	2.65	72.27	0.31	72.58	0.92	73.50	0.37	73.87	0.41	74.28	0.76	75.04	−2.17	72.87	−0.86	72.01
Tatarstan	75.03	69.74	79.92	10.18	75.33	73.95	1.38	72.17	0.64	72.81	0.83	73.64	0.56	74.20	0.15	74.35	0.68	75.03	−2.42	72.61	−1.33	71.28
Kalmykia	74.84	69.32	80.27	10.95	75.06	74.71	0.35	72.03	0.12	72.15	1.20	73.35	0.19	73.54	0.30	73.84	1.00	74.84	−1.91	72.93	−1.53	71.40
Stavropol Krai	74.66	70.10	78.90	8.80	75.40	73.61	1.79	72.75	0.61	73.36	0.04	73.40	0.79	74.19	−0.01	74.18	0.48	74.66	−1.46	73.20	−1.54	71.66
Belgorod Oblast	74.21	69.30	78.85	9.55	74.41	73.63	0.78	72.25	0.36	72.61	0.26	72.87	0.80	73.67	0.00	73.67	0.54	74.21	−1.84	72.37	−1.70	70.67
Yamalo-Nenets AO (Tyumen Oblast)	74.18	69.39	78.61	9.22	74.98	69.97	5.01	71.92	−0.22	71.70	0.43	72.13	1.40	73.53	0.54	74.07	0.11	74.18	−2.27	71.91	−0.21	71.70
Volgograd Oblast	74.07	69.10	78.78	9.68	74.50	72.64	1.86	71.62	0.36	71.98	0.51	72.49	1.05	73.54	−0.07	73.47	0.60	74.07	−2.09	71.98	−2.02	69.96
Mordovia	73.95	68.80	78.89	10.09	74.51	72.70	1.81	71.38	0.68	72.06	0.19	72.25	1.15	73.40	0.26	73.66	0.29	73.95	−2.35	71.60	−1.36	70.24
Krasnodar Krai	73.91	68.98	78.66	9.68	73.43	74.53	−1.10	72.28	0.25	72.53	0.30	72.83	0.59	73.42	0.88	74.30	−0.39	73.91	−1.67	72.24	−1.71	70.53
Moscow Oblast	73.86	69.04	78.25	9.21	73.53	75.44	−1.91	70.94	1.32	72.26	0.24	72.50	0.84	73.34	0.18	73.52	0.34	73.86	−2.19	71.67	−1.32	70.35
Astrakhan Oblast	73.86	68.95	78.58	9.63	74.01	73.36	0.65	70.76	0.60	71.36	0.84	72.20	1.15	73.35	0.13	73.48	0.38	73.86	−1.85	72.01	−2.11	69.90
Adygea	73.85	69.06	78.42	9.36	74.35	73.44	0.91	72.01	0.21	72.22	0.37	72.59	0.66	73.25	0.31	73.56	0.29	73.85	−0.58	73.27	−2.05	71.22
Rostov Oblast	73.69	69.11	78.02	8.91	73.98	73.05	0.93	71.30	0.60	71.90	0.30	72.20	0.83	73.03	0.18	73.21	0.48	73.69	−1.65	72.04	−2.25	69.79
Leningrad Oblast	73.64	68.51	78.64	10.13	72.63	75.83	−3.20	70.28	0.95	71.23	0.47	71.70	0.84	72.54	0.53	73.07	0.57	73.64	−2.11	71.53	−1.36	70.17
Voronezh Oblast	73.63	68.20	78.84	10.64	73.88	73.08	0.80	70.82	0.85	71.67	0.41	72.08	0.95	73.03	0.12	73.15	0.48	73.63	−1.72	71.91	−2.42	69.49
Penza Oblast	73.61	68.09	78.87	10.78	74.09	72.51	1.58	71.63	0.49	72.12	0.41	72.53	0.81	73.34	−0.13	73.21	0.40	73.61	−2.27	71.34	−1.37	69.97
Tambov Oblast	73.56	68.00	79.01	11.01	73.64	73.33	0.31	71.11	0.56	71.67	0.44	72.11	1.10	73.21	−0.26	72.95	0.61	73.56	−1.78	71.78	−1.90	69.88
Kaliningrad Oblast	73.56	68.70	77.99	9.29	73.79	72.93	0.86	70.28	0.30	70.58	1.34	71.92	0.70	72.62	0.30	72.92	0.64	73.56	−0.63	72.93	−1.94	70.99
Sevastopol	73.53	68.65	78.05	9.40	73.31	76.98	−3.67	72.28	−1.61	70.67	0.97	71.64	1.73	73.37	0.26	73.63	−0.10	73.53	0.05	73.58	−1.33	72.25
Chuvashia	73.44	67.64	79.25	11.61	74.43	71.76	2.67	70.62	0.73	71.35	0.17	71.52	1.21	72.73	0.22	72.95	0.49	73.44	−2.41	71.03	−1.04	69.99
Lipetsk Oblast	73.34	67.89	78.48	10.59	73.70	72.57	1.13	70.60	0.47	71.07	0.55	71.62	0.84	72.46	0.16	72.62	0.72	73.34	−2.75	70.59	−2.01	68.58
Ryazan Oblast	73.20	67.66	78.51	10.85	73.25	72.76	0.49	70.80	0.66	71.46	0.41	71.87	0.83	72.70	0.14	72.84	0.36	73.20	−2.25	70.95	−2.34	68.61
Nenets AO (Arkhangelsk Oblast)	73.19	67.68	78.40	10.72	75.70	67.41	8.29	70.65	0.35	71.00	0.08	71.08	0.44	71.52	0.33	71.85	1.34	73.19	−2.79	70.40	−1.01	69.39
Saratov Oblast	73.07	67.95	77.89	9.94	73.41	72.00	1.41	70.95	0.45	71.40	0.67	72.07	0.81	72.88	0.07	72.95	0.12	73.07	−1.93	71.14	−2.06	69.08
Sakha (Yakutia)	73.00	68.14	77.87	9.73	73.19	72.41	0.78	69.81	0.48	70.29	0.55	70.84	0.84	71.68	1.04	72.72	0.28	73.00	−1.90	71.10	−1.12	69.98
Kirov Oblast	72.96	67.35	78.43	11.08	73.63	70.04	3.59	70.59	0.52	71.11	0.60	71.71	1.01	72.72	−0.25	72.47	0.49	72.96	−1.54	71.42	−1.69	69.73
Ulyanovsk Oblast	72.96	67.70	77.96	10.26	73.02	72.38	0.64	70.37	0.09	70.46	0.51	70.97	1.37	72.34	−0.17	72.17	0.79	72.96	−1.98	70.98	−1.93	69.05
Yaroslavl Oblast	72.92	67.35	77.96	10.61	73.00	72.45	0.55	70.64	0.34	70.98	0.23	71.21	0.64	71.85	0.40	72.25	0.67	72.92	−1.98	70.94	−1.87	69.07
Mari El	72.90	66.94	78.83	11.89	73.37	71.86	1.51	69.42	0.38	69.80	0.95	70.75	1.49	72.24	−0.25	71.99	0.91	72.90	−1.85	71.05	−1.59	69.46
Tomsk Oblast	72.85	67.66	77.88	10.22	73.79	70.46	3.33	70.67	0.58	71.25	0.41	71.66	0.36	72.02	0.82	72.84	0.01	72.85	−1.68	71.17	−1.47	69.70
Udmurtia	72.80	67.01	78.27	11.26	73.44	71.39	2.05	70.03	0.43	70.46	0.40	70.86	1.20	72.06	0.39	72.45	0.35	72.80	−1.77	71.03	−1.04	69.99
Samara Oblast	72.77	67.48	77.70	10.22	72.83	72.51	0.32	69.63	0.72	70.35	0.73	71.08	0.65	71.73	0.58	72.31	0.46	72.77	−2.32	70.45	−1.12	69.33
Tyumen Oblast (except two AO)	72.75	67.52	77.83	10.31	73.93	70.54	3.39	70.32	0.26	70.58	0.45	71.03	1.03	72.06	0.02	72.08	0.67	72.75	−1.41	71.34	−1.20	70.14
Republic of Crimea	72.71	67.76	77.41	9.65	72.10	73.35	−1.25	70.74	−0.22	70.52	0.22	70.74	1.26	72.00	0.22	72.22	0.49	72.71	−1.51	71.20	−1.50	69.70
Bashkortostan	72.64	67.26	77.96	10.70	73.49	71.10	2.39	69.76	0.32	70.08	0.92	71.00	0.73	71.73	0.33	72.06	0.58	72.64	−2.28	70.36	−0.87	69.49
Oryol Oblast	72.56	67.10	77.67	10.57	73.16	71.23	1.93	69.88	0.50	70.38	0.35	70.73	0.90	71.63	−0.07	71.56	1.00	72.56	−2.46	70.10	−1.13	68.97
Kaluga Oblast	72.35	66.75	77.90	11.15	72.11	73.08	−0.97	69.93	0.80	70.73	0.45	71.18	0.69	71.87	0.02	71.89	0.46	72.35	−1.97	70.38	−1.22	69.16
Kostroma Oblast	72.35	66.90	77.51	10.61	72.62	71.32	1.30	70.05	0.33	70.38	0.49	70.87	0.94	71.81	0.06	71.87	0.48	72.35	−1.43	70.92	−2.14	68.78
Omsk Oblast	72.32	66.93	77.41	10.48	73.11	70.21	2.90	70.13	0.28	70.41	0.37	70.78	0.71	71.49	0.47	71.96	0.36	72.32	−2.00	70.32	−1.30	69.02
Nizhny Novgorod Oblast	72.32	66.51	77.79	11.28	72.38	71.89	0.49	69.53	0.64	70.17	0.58	70.75	1.13	71.88	−0.19	71.69	0.63	72.32	−1.99	70.33	−1.40	68.93
Bryansk Oblast	72.31	66.55	77.92	11.37	72.75	71.23	1.52	69.42	0.94	70.36	0.56	70.92	0.35	71.27	0.44	71.71	0.60	72.31	−1.68	70.63	−1.96	68.67
Arkhangelsk Oblast (except AO)	72.30	66.77	77.68	10.91	73.33	67.94	5.39	70.20	0.50	70.70	0.10	70.80	1.16	71.96	0.13	72.09	0.21	72.30	−0.91	71.39	−1.79	69.60
Kursk Oblast	72.27	66.67	77.67	11.00	73.23	70.15	3.08	70.11	0.69	70.80	0.14	70.94	0.80	71.74	0.17	71.91	0.36	72.27	−1.75	70.52	−1.96	68.56
Novosibirsk Oblast	72.25	67.06	77.17	10.11	72.85	69.84	3.01	70.28	0.58	70.86	0.34	71.20	0.37	71.57	0.26	71.83	0.42	72.25	−1.93	70.32	−1.13	69.19
Tula Oblast	72.21	66.68	77.47	10.79	72.11	72.51	−0.40	69.63	0.43	70.06	0.50	70.56	0.62	71.18	0.59	71.77	0.44	72.21	−2.01	70.20	−1.23	68.97
Chelyabinsk Oblast	72.08	66.53	77.31	10.78	72.60	69.63	2.97	69.71	0.19	69.90	0.60	70.50	1.03	71.53	0.11	71.64	0.44	72.08	−1.79	70.29	−1.13	69.16
Orenburg Oblast	72.04	66.62	77.31	10.69	72.21	71.57	0.64	68.73	0.90	69.63	0.94	70.57	0.37	70.94	0.51	71.45	0.59	72.04	−2.31	69.73	−1.52	68.21
Smolensk Oblast	71.89	66.53	77.10	10.57	72.34	70.64	1.70	69.44	0.30	69.74	0.24	69.98	1.16	71.14	0.02	71.16	0.73	71.89	−1.79	70.10	−2.10	68.00
Vladimir Oblast	71.87	66.12	77.26	11.14	71.81	71.99	−0.18	69.25	0.57	69.82	0.46	70.28	0.87	71.15	0.08	71.23	0.64	71.87	−1.84	70.03	−1.92	68.11
Ivanovo Oblast	71.84	66.49	76.71	10.22	71.82	71.83	−0.01	69.88	0.74	70.62	0.15	70.77	0.70	71.47	−0.18	71.29	0.55	71.84	−1.18	70.66	−1.64	69.02
Vologda Oblast	71.82	65.90	77.63	11.73	72.31	70.13	2.18	69.74	0.66	70.40	−0.16	70.24	1.02	71.26	0.17	71.43	0.39	71.82	−1.11	70.71	−1.63	69.08
Sverdlovsk Oblast	71.81	66.10	77.23	11.13	72.03	70.44	1.59	69.76	0.07	69.83	0.19	70.02	1.21	71.23	0.06	71.29	0.52	71.81	−1.66	70.15	−1.36	68.79
Murmansk Oblast	71.75	66.49	76.57	10.08	71.55	74.44	−2.89	69.97	0.27	70.24	0.70	70.94	0.73	71.67	0.01	71.68	0.07	71.75	−1.94	69.81	−1.52	68.29
Altai Krai	71.61	66.31	76.77	10.46	72.22	70.57	1.65	70.01	0.43	70.44	0.30	70.74	0.36	71.10	0.01	71.11	0.50	71.61	−1.42	70.19	−1.59	68.60
Karelia	71.46	65.73	76.88	11.15	72.62	66.41	6.21	69.36	−0.20	69.16	0.62	69.78	0.87	70.65	−0.09	70.56	0.90	71.46	−1.83	69.63	−2.32	67.31
Perm Krai	71.32	65.52	76.89	11.37	72.08	68.85	3.23	69.04	0.05	69.09	0.65	69.74	1.05	70.79	−0.07	70.72	0.60	71.32	−1.73	69.59	−1.07	68.52
Komi	71.30	65.78	76.68	10.90	72.28	67.28	5.00	69.05	0.35	69.40	0.05	69.45	1.60	71.05	0.01	71.06	0.24	71.30	−1.00	70.30	−1.98	68.32
Tver Oblast	71.24	65.79	76.51	10.72	71.57	70.07	1.50	68.43	0.67	69.10	0.14	69.24	1.21	70.45	0.02	70.47	0.77	71.24	−1.48	69.76	−1.89	67.87
Krasnoyarsk Krai	71.16	65.83	76.30	10.47	72.08	67.91	4.17	69.23	0.46	69.69	0.32	70.01	0.60	70.61	0.10	70.71	0.45	71.16	−1.34	69.82	−1.47	68.35
Kurgan Oblast	71.14	65.29	77.11	11.82	71.63	70.20	1.43	68.75	0.28	69.03	0.40	69.43	1.37	70.80	−0.02	70.78	0.36	71.14	−1.20	69.94	−1.65	68.29
Khakassia	71.05	65.44	76.55	11.11	72.23	68.37	3.86	68.83	−0.15	68.68	0.65	69.33	0.88	70.21	0.94	71.15	−0.10	71.05	−0.99	70.06	−1.57	68.49
Buryatia	70.77	65.36	76.12	10.76	72.20	68.70	3.50	68.54	0.61	69.15	0.46	69.61	1.08	70.69	0.15	70.84	−0.07	70.77	−0.48	70.29	−1.38	68.91
Pskov Oblast	70.65	65.36	75.78	10.42	70.28	71.13	−0.85	68.07	0.41	68.48	0.77	69.25	0.70	69.95	0.21	70.16	0.49	70.65	−1.52	69.13	−1.44	67.69
Kamchatka Krai	70.57	65.63	75.89	10.26	71.46	67.63	3.83	68.06	0.50	68.56	0.10	68.66	1.40	70.06	0.03	70.09	0.48	70.57	−1.30	69.27	−1.18	68.09
Primorsky Krai	70.54	65.57	75.62	10.05	71.20	68.30	2.90	68.74	0.47	69.21	0.45	69.66	0.70	70.36	0.12	70.48	0.06	70.54	−0.99	69.55	−0.94	68.61
Novgorod Oblast	70.52	64.51	76.42	11.91	70.65	69.65	1.00	68.41	0.29	68.70	0.45	69.15	0.53	69.68	0.58	70.26	0.26	70.52	−0.93	69.59	−1.95	67.64
Altai	70.29	64.52	76.05	11.53	71.11	69.59	1.52	67.76	0.68	68.44	1.69	70.13	1.02	71.15	−0.56	70.59	−0.30	70.29	−1.14	69.15	−1.29	67.86
Sakhalin Oblast	70.28	65.03	75.73	10.70	70.68	68.12	2.56	67.89	0.10	67.99	0.67	68.66	1.53	70.19	−0.27	69.92	0.36	70.28	−0.55	69.73	−1.31	68.42
Khabarovsk Krai	70.05	64.44	75.72	11.28	70.24	69.07	1.17	68.01	0.71	68.72	0.41	69.13	0.61	69.74	0.45	70.19	−0.14	70.05	−1.44	68.61	−0.76	67.85
Kuzbass	69.78	64.32	75.11	10.79	69.97	68.48	1.49	67.80	0.51	68.31	0.41	68.72	0.63	69.35	−0.03	69.32	0.46	69.78	−1.27	68.51	−0.90	67.61
Magadan Oblast	69.66	64.21	75.33	11.12	69.81	64.24	5.57	67.19	0.92	68.11	0.89	69.00	0.37	69.37	0.25	69.62	0.04	69.66	−0.62	69.04	−1.63	67.41
Irkutsk Oblast	69.55	63.80	75.14	11.34	70.09	67.56	2.53	66.87	0.50	67.37	0.83	68.20	0.99	69.19	0.12	69.31	0.24	69.55	−1.30	68.25	−1.45	66.80
Zabaykalsky Krai	68.88	63.30	74.76	11.46	69.80	66.67	3.13	67.38	−0.04	67.34	0.99	68.33	1.31	69.64	−0.65	68.99	−0.11	68.88	−0.65	68.23	−1.41	66.82
Amur Oblast	68.66	63.52	73.91	10.39	69.19	67.43	1.76	67.00	0.27	67.27	1.01	68.28	0.78	69.06	0.05	69.11	−0.45	68.66	−1.28	67.38	−1.08	66.30
Chukotka	68.09	64.37	72.77	8.40	73.28	57.36	15.92	62.32	1.84	64.16	0.26	64.42	1.68	66.10	−2.52	63.58	4.51	68.09	−2.27	65.82	−0.95	64.87
Jewish Autonomous Oblast	68.08	63.23	72.82	9.59	68.19	67.73	0.46	65.20	−0.16	65.04	0.84	65.88	2.95	68.83	−0.23	68.60	−0.52	68.08	−0.58	67.50	−1.38	66.12
Tuva	67.57	62.51	72.47	9.96	69.80	63.92	5.88	61.79	1.34	63.13	1.08	64.21	2.08	66.29	0.18	66.47	1.10	67.57	−1.32	66.25	0.63	66.88
federal subject	overall	males	females	F Δ M	urban	rural	urban Δ rural	2014	2014 →2015	2015	2015 →2016	2016	2016 →2017	2017	2017 →2018	2018	2018 →2019	2019	2019 →2020	2020	2020 →2021	2021

== See also ==
- List of countries by life expectancy
- List of European countries by life expectancy
- List of Asian countries by life expectancy
- List of U.S. states by life expectancy
- List of European regions by life expectancy
- List of Asian regions by life expectancy
- Demographics of Russia
- Healthcare in Russia
