= Miryang No clan =

Korean clan from South Gyeongsang Province

- Country: Korea
- Current region: Miryang
- Founder: Lu Zhonglian

Miryang No (Korean: 밀양 노씨; Hanja: 密陽 魯氏), (Note: The surname "No" is also variously written as "Nho" or "Noh".) is one of the Korean clans, with its Bon-gwan related to Miryang, South Gyeongsang Province, South Korea.

== Genealogy ==
The clan's founder was Lu Zhonglian who belonged to the Qi (state) and is recorded to have been active during the Spring and Autumn period, China. (Note: In the Records of the Grand Historian, (Shiji), written by the Han dynasty historian Sima Qian, chapter 83 in the section on biographies – titled Liezhuan – is dedicated to describe the life of Zhonglian.) As per Guanglin (2014), "...the Hamyŏl-Namgung clan, T'aean-Kyŏng clan, Ponghwa-Kŭm clan, Miryang-No clan, T'osan-Kung clan, and others are said to descend from followers of Kija. The founders of these five clans were all men of the Koryŏ dynasty."

According to the year 2000 census conducted by the Korean National Statistical Office, the size of the Miryang No clan was 1268.

== See also ==
- Korean clan names of foreign origin
