= List of South Korean regions by life expectancy =

South Korea at the 1st level of administrative division is divided to 1 special city, 6 metropolitan cities, 1 special self-governing city, 8 provinces, and 1 special self-governing province. According to estimation of Statistics Korea (KOSTAT), life expectancy at birth in South Korea in 2023 was 83.5 years (80.6 years for male and 86.4 years for female). Difference in life expectancy between female and male is 5.9 years.

The leading causes of death are

- malignant neoplasms (19.1% of cases),
- heart diseases (10.0%),
- pneumonia (10.0%),
- cerebrovascular diseases (6.9%).

COVID-19 in 2023 accounted for 2.4% of deaths.

The agency estimates that if an effective treatment or prevention of cancer is developed, then life expectancy in the country will additionally increase by 3.3 years. If an effective means of treating or prevention of heart diseases is created, life expectancy will increase by 1.2 years. And if pneumonia is excluded from the causes of death, life expectancy will increase by 1.0 year. These numbers are not cumulative, because these types of treatment do not affect the underlying cause of death - aging.

According to alternative estimation of life expectancy in South Korea from the department of the United Nations, in 2023 this indicator was 84.33 years (81.19 for male, 87.16 for female).

Estimation of the World Bank Group for 2023: 83.43 years total (80.60 for male, 86.40 for female).

According to estimation of the WHO for 2019, at that year life expectancy in South Korea was 83.69 years (80.56 years for male and 86.56 years for female).
And healthy life expectancy was 72.50 years (70.62 years for male and 74.19 years for female).

== Statistics Korea (2023) ==
province or provincial-level city	Life expectancy for population in general							Life expectancy for male				Life expectancy for female				Female Δ Male			
province or provincial-level city	at birth	bonus 0→65	at 65	bonus 65→80	at 80	bonus 80→100	at 100	at birth	at 65	at 80	at 100	at birth	at 65	at 80	at 100	at birth	at 65	at 80	at 100
South Korea	83.5	3.0	21.5	3.2	9.7	12.5	2.2	80.6	19.2	8.3	1.8	86.4	23.6	10.7	2.3	5.8	4.4	2.4	0.5
Seoul	85.0	2.6	22.6	2.9	10.5	12.2	2.7	82.0	20.3	9.0	2.1	88.0	24.9	11.8	2.8	6.0	4.6	2.8	0.7
Gyeonggi Province	83.9	2.7	21.6	3.2	9.8	12.5	2.3	81.2	19.6	8.5	2.0	86.6	23.6	10.8	2.3	5.4	4.0	2.3	0.3
Jeju Province	83.7	3.5	22.2	3.4	10.6	12.4	3.0	79.7	19.1	8.2	1.8	87.7	25.2	12.4	3.1	8.0	6.1	4.2	1.3
Sejong	83.7	2.2	20.9	3.0	8.9	13.0	1.9	81.3	18.7	7.4	1.4	86.2	23.1	10.1	1.9	4.9	4.4	2.7	0.5
Daejeon	83.6	2.9	21.5	3.3	9.8	12.5	2.3	81.1	19.5	8.5	1.9	86.1	23.4	10.8	2.4	5.0	3.9	2.3	0.5
Daegu	83.2	3.1	21.3	3.1	9.4	12.7	2.1	80.2	19.1	8.1	1.8	86.2	23.3	10.5	2.2	6.0	4.2	2.4	0.4
Gwangju	83.1	3.2	21.3	3.1	9.4	12.7	2.1	80.3	19.1	8.3	1.8	86.0	23.2	10.3	2.2	5.7	4.1	2.0	0.4
Incheon	83.1	3.1	21.2	3.4	9.6	12.6	2.2	80.1	18.9	8.2	1.9	86.1	23.4	10.6	2.3	6.0	4.5	2.4	0.4
North Jeolla Province	83.1	3.1	21.2	3.4	9.6	12.6	2.2	80.0	18.9	8.2	1.8	86.2	23.4	10.6	2.3	6.2	4.5	2.4	0.5
South Chungcheong Province	83.0	3.3	21.3	3.4	9.7	12.6	2.3	80.0	19.0	8.2	1.8	86.1	23.5	10.9	2.4	6.1	4.5	2.7	0.6
Ulsan	82.9	3.0	20.9	3.1	9.0	12.9	1.9	80.4	19.1	8.0	1.8	85.5	22.7	9.8	1.9	5.1	3.6	1.8	0.1
Gangwon Province	82.8	3.5	21.3	3.2	9.5	12.8	2.3	79.5	18.9	7.9	1.7	86.2	23.5	10.8	2.3	6.7	4.6	2.9	0.6
South Gyeongsang Province	82.8	3.0	20.8	3.4	9.2	12.9	2.1	79.7	18.4	7.7	1.6	85.9	23.1	10.4	2.2	6.2	4.7	2.7	0.6
North Gyeongsang Province	82.7	3.4	21.1	3.3	9.4	12.8	2.2	79.5	18.7	7.9	1.7	85.9	23.2	10.6	2.2	6.4	4.5	2.7	0.5
Busan	82.6	3.2	20.8	3.3	9.1	12.8	1.9	79.7	18.7	8.0	1.7	85.6	22.8	10.0	2.0	5.9	4.1	2.0	0.3
South Jeolla Province	82.5	3.5	21.0	3.4	9.4	12.8	2.2	79.3	18.6	7.8	1.6	85.8	23.3	10.6	2.3	6.5	4.7	2.8	0.7
North Chungcheong Province	82.4	3.4	20.8	3.4	9.2	12.8	2.0	79.4	18.7	7.9	1.7	85.4	22.8	10.2	2.1	6.0	4.1	2.3	0.4

Data source: Statistics Korea. The calculations are based on rounded data, which in some cases leads to an error of 0.1 years.

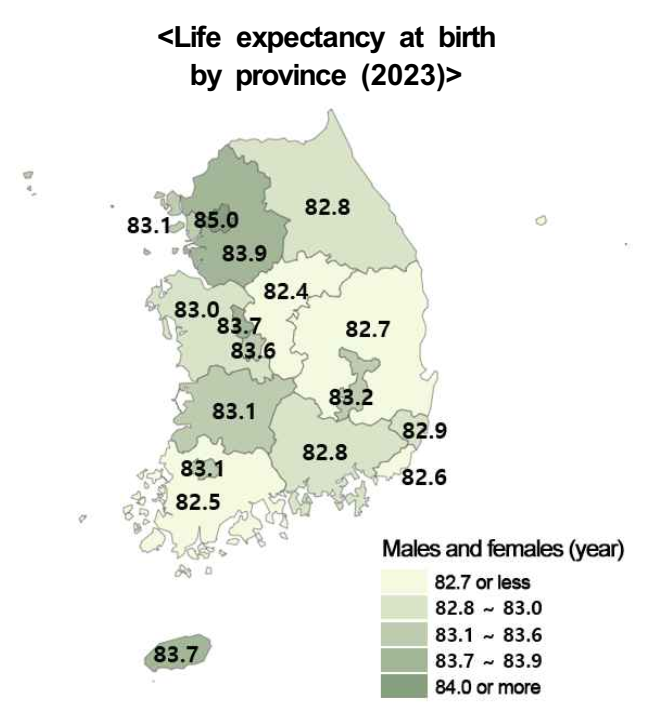
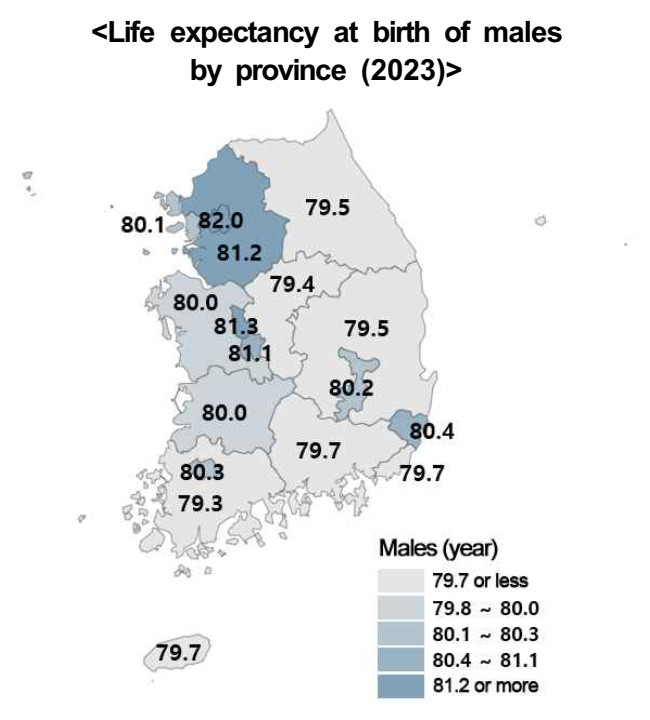
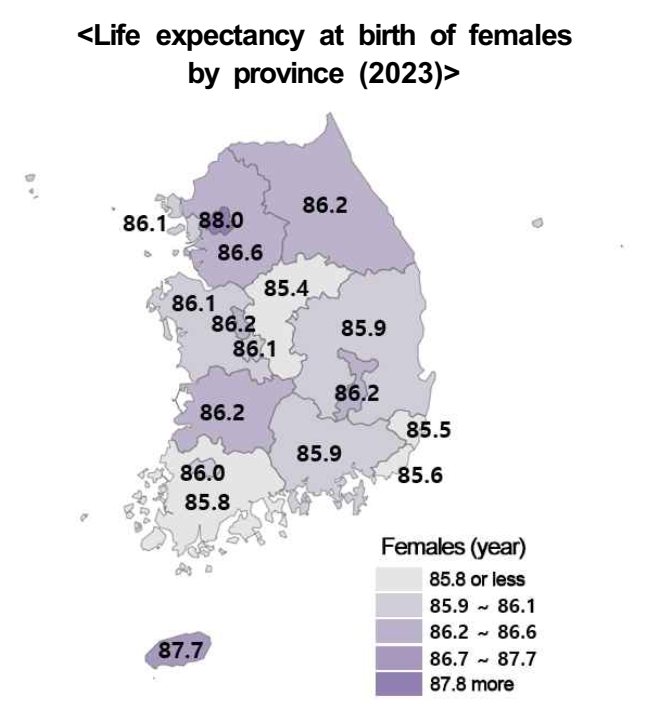
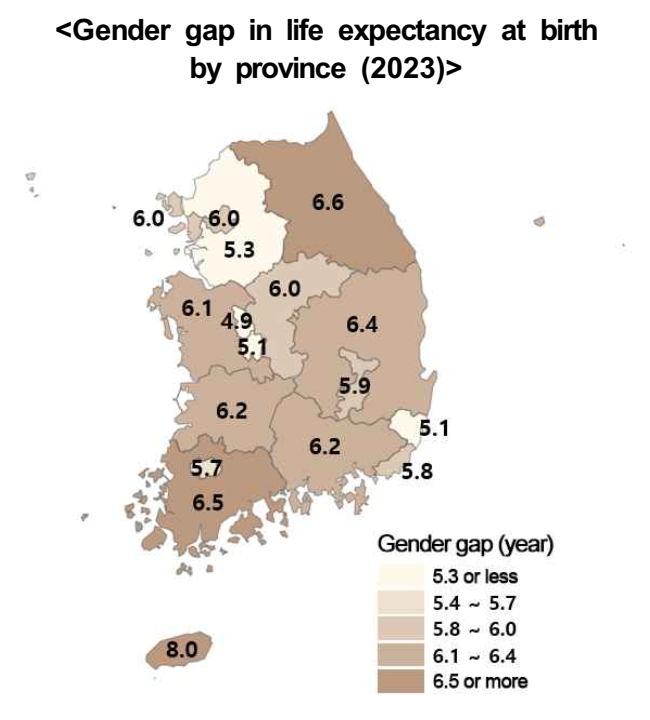
Maps of life expectancy at birth in regions of South Korea: total, for males, for females, difference of life expectancy between females and males

== Global Data Lab (2022) ==
region	2019				2019 →2021	2021	2021 →2022	2022				2019 →2022
region	overall	male	female	F Δ M	2019 →2021	overall	2021 →2022	overall	male	female	F Δ M	2019 →2022
South Korea on average	83.66	80.30	86.71	6.41	0.04	83.70	0.32	84.02	80.70	87.10	6.40	0.36
Jeju	85.20	78.88	86.20	7.32	0.04	85.24	0.33	85.57	79.27	86.59	7.32	0.37
Capital Region (Seoul and Gyeonggi Province)	84.68	81.02	86.86	5.84	0.05	84.73	0.33	85.06	81.41	87.25	5.84	0.38
Chungcheong Region	83.96	79.90	86.47	6.57	0.05	84.01	0.32	84.33	80.29	86.86	6.57	0.37
Jeolla Region	83.45	79.19	86.81	7.62	0.04	83.49	0.33	83.82	79.57	87.20	7.63	0.37
Gyeongnam Region	83.14	79.84	86.30	6.46	0.04	83.18	0.33	83.51	80.23	86.69	6.46	0.37
Gyeongbuk Region	83.14	79.54	85.59	6.05	0.04	83.18	0.33	83.51	79.93	85.98	6.05	0.37
Gangwon Region	82.63	80.05	86.86	6.81	0.04	82.67	0.32	82.99	80.44	87.25	6.81	0.36

Data source: Global Data Lab

== Probability of survival to certain ages (2023) ==
The probability of survival show a probability for an abstracted average person to reach certain age if the life conditions in a given year and location will be exprapolated to the whole life. Expressed as a percentage, this indicator is also called "percentage surviving".

Age	South Korea on average				Gyeonggi Province				Seoul			
Age	Percentage surviving		F Δ M	F / M	Percentage surviving		F Δ M	F / M	Percentage surviving		F Δ M	F / M
Age	male	female	F Δ M	F / M	male	female	F Δ M	F / M	male	female	F Δ M	F / M
1	99.7	99.8	0.1	1.00	99.8	99.8	0.0	1.00	99.8	99.8	0.1	1.00
5	99.7	99.7	0.1	1.00	99.7	99.8	0.0	1.00	99.7	99.8	0.0	1.00
10	99.6	99.7	0.1	1.00	99.7	99.7	0.0	1.00	99.7	99.8	0.0	1.00
15	99.6	99.6	0.1	1.00	99.6	99.7	0.0	1.00	99.7	99.7	0.0	1.00
20	99.4	99.5	0.1	1.00	99.5	99.6	0.1	1.00	99.5	99.6	0.1	1.00
25	99.2	99.4	0.2	1.00	99.3	99.5	0.2	1.00	99.4	99.5	0.2	1.00
30	98.9	99.2	0.3	1.00	99.0	99.3	0.3	1.00	99.1	99.4	0.3	1.00
35	98.6	99.0	0.4	1.00	98.7	99.1	0.4	1.00	98.8	99.2	0.4	1.00
40	98.1	98.7	0.6	1.01	98.3	98.9	0.6	1.01	98.5	99.0	0.5	1.01
45	97.5	98.3	0.9	1.01	97.7	98.5	0.8	1.01	97.9	98.6	0.7	1.01
50	96.5	97.8	1.4	1.01	96.9	98.0	1.1	1.01	97.1	98.2	1.1	1.01
55	94.9	97.1	2.2	1.02	95.5	97.3	1.9	1.02	95.7	97.5	1.8	1.02
60	92.5	96.1	3.7	1.04	93.3	96.4	3.1	1.03	93.5	96.7	3.1	1.03
65	89.0	94.8	5.8	1.07	90.1	95.1	5.0	1.06	90.4	95.5	5.1	1.06
70	83.9	92.8	8.9	1.11	85.2	93.1	7.9	1.09	85.9	93.7	7.8	1.09
75	75.9	89.0	13.1	1.17	77.4	89.4	12.0	1.16	78.9	90.7	11.8	1.15
80	63.6	81.8	18.2	1.29	65.3	82.1	16.9	1.26	67.8	84.5	16.8	1.25
85	44.3	67.2	22.8	1.52	46.3	67.3	21.0	1.45	49.5	71.9	22.4	1.45
90	22.4	44.0	21.6	1.96	24.3	44.2	19.9	1.82	27.4	50.8	23.3	1.85
95	6.8	19.4	12.6	2.86	7.9	19.6	11.7	2.48	9.8	26.0	16.2	2.66
100	1.0	4.6	3.7	4.78	1.3	4.7	3.4	3.71	1.9	8.1	6.3	4.39

Data source: Statistics Korea

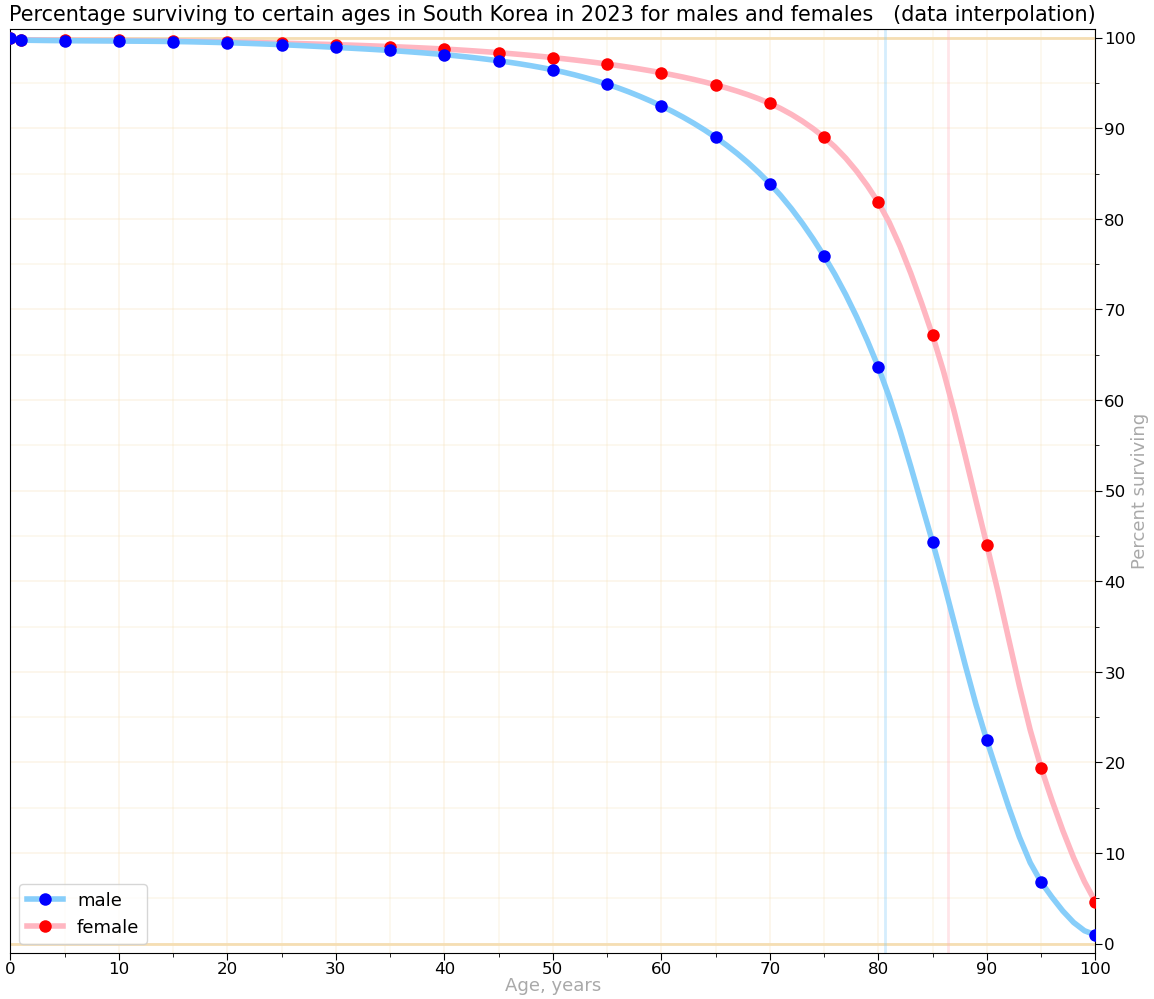
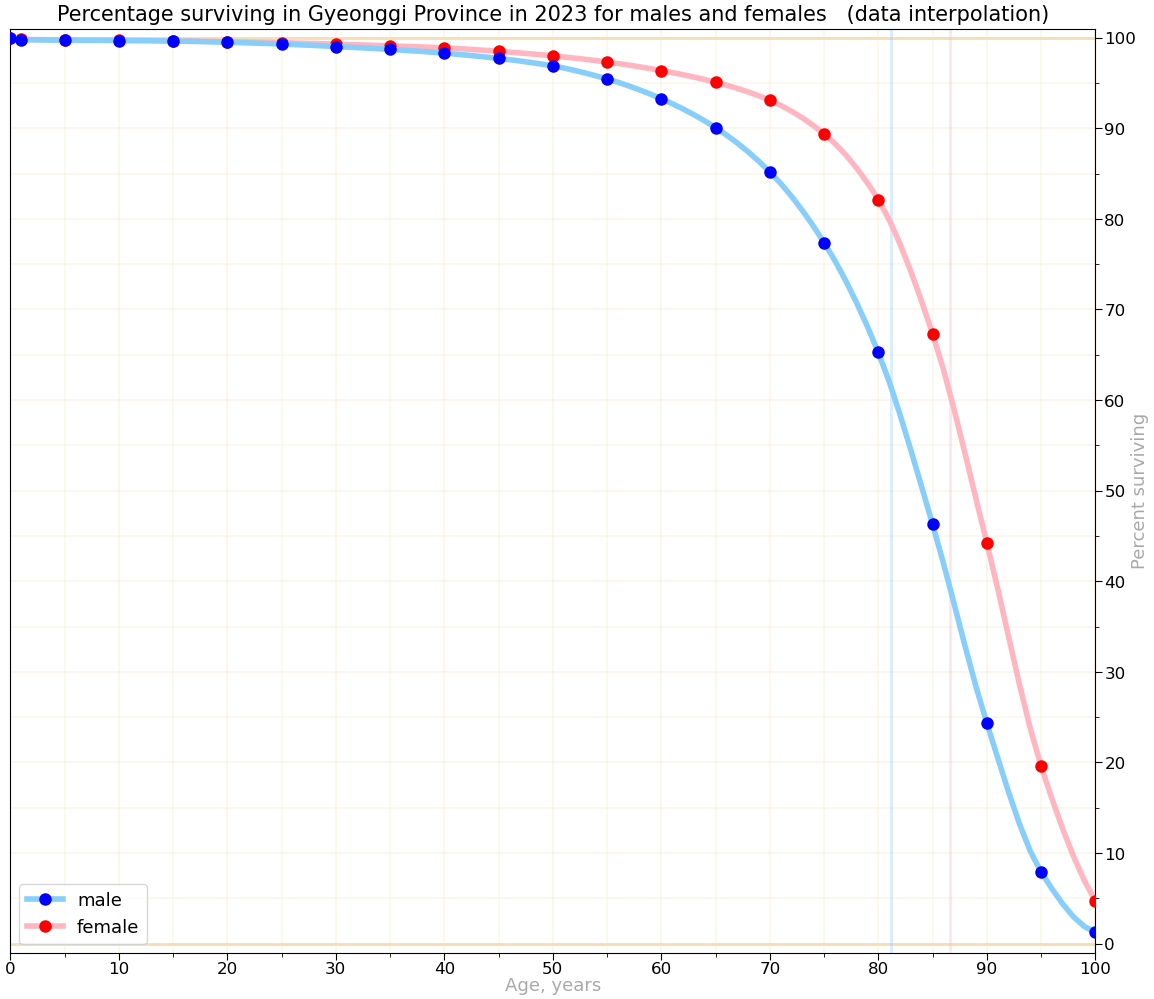
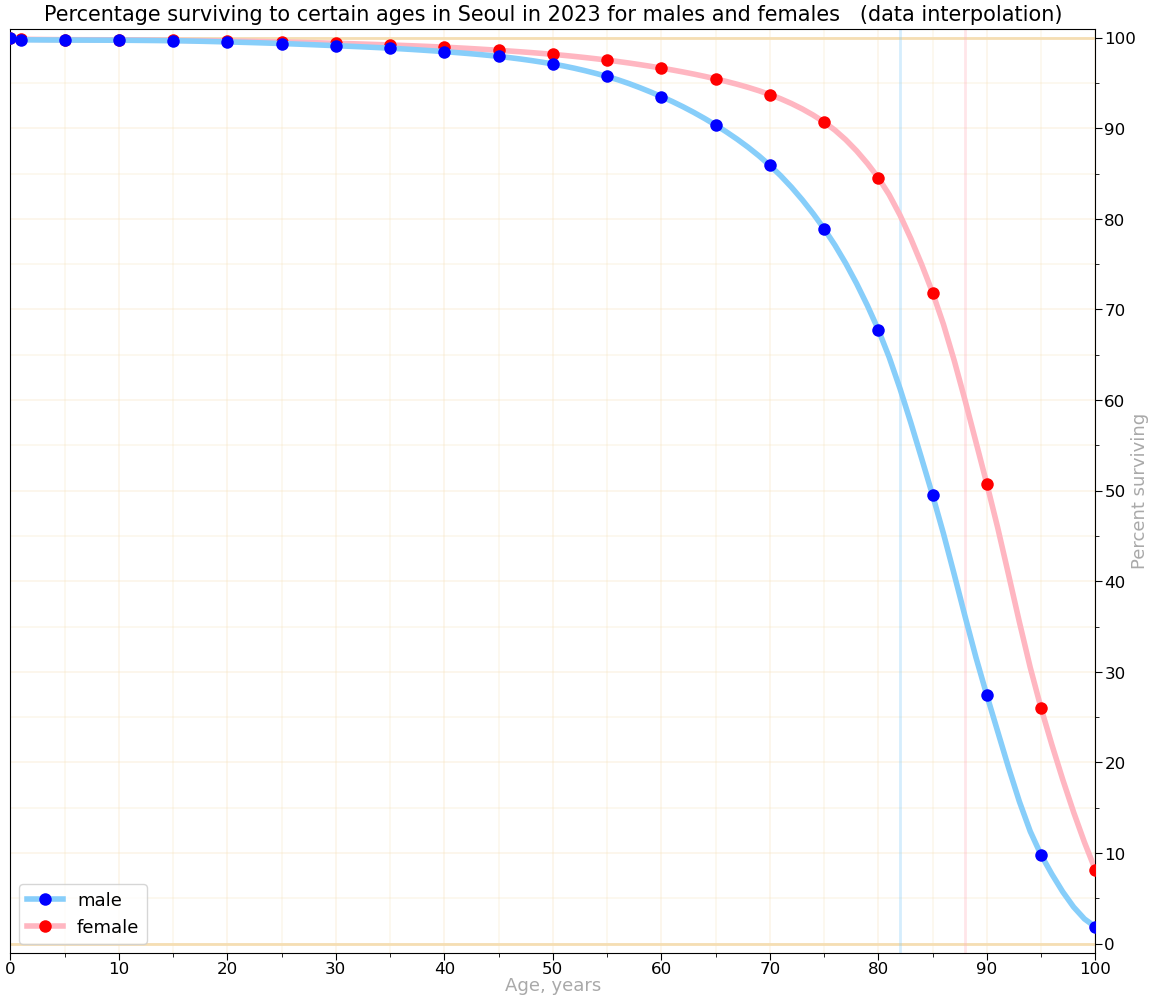
Charts of percentage surviving for South Korea, Gyeonggi Province, and Seoul.
Since values in the database were given with step of 5 years, the charts were generated using interpolation.

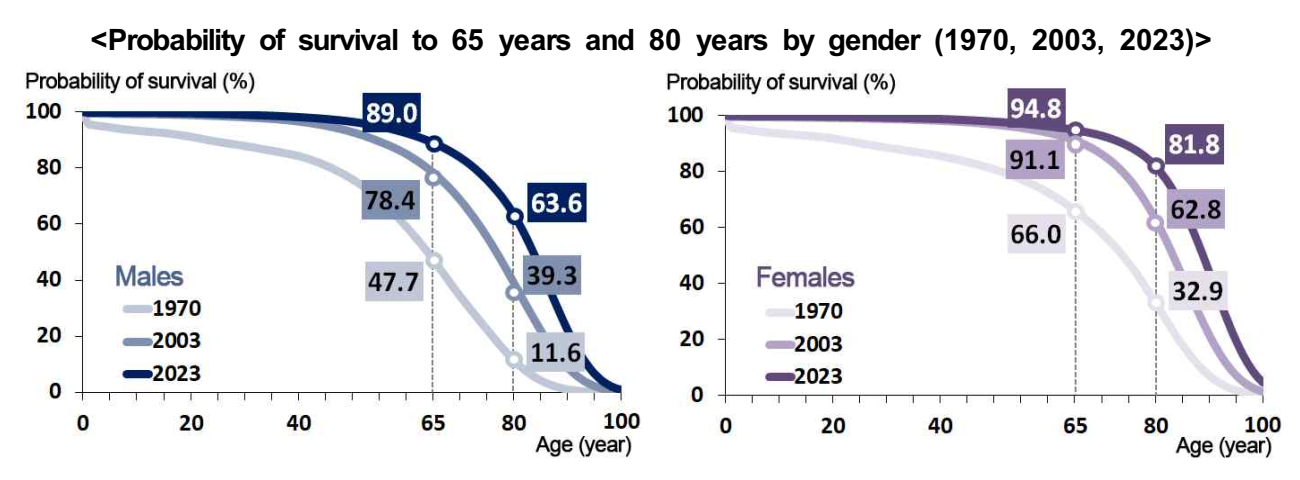
Comparison of charts of the probability of survival in 1970, 2003, and 2023

== Charts ==
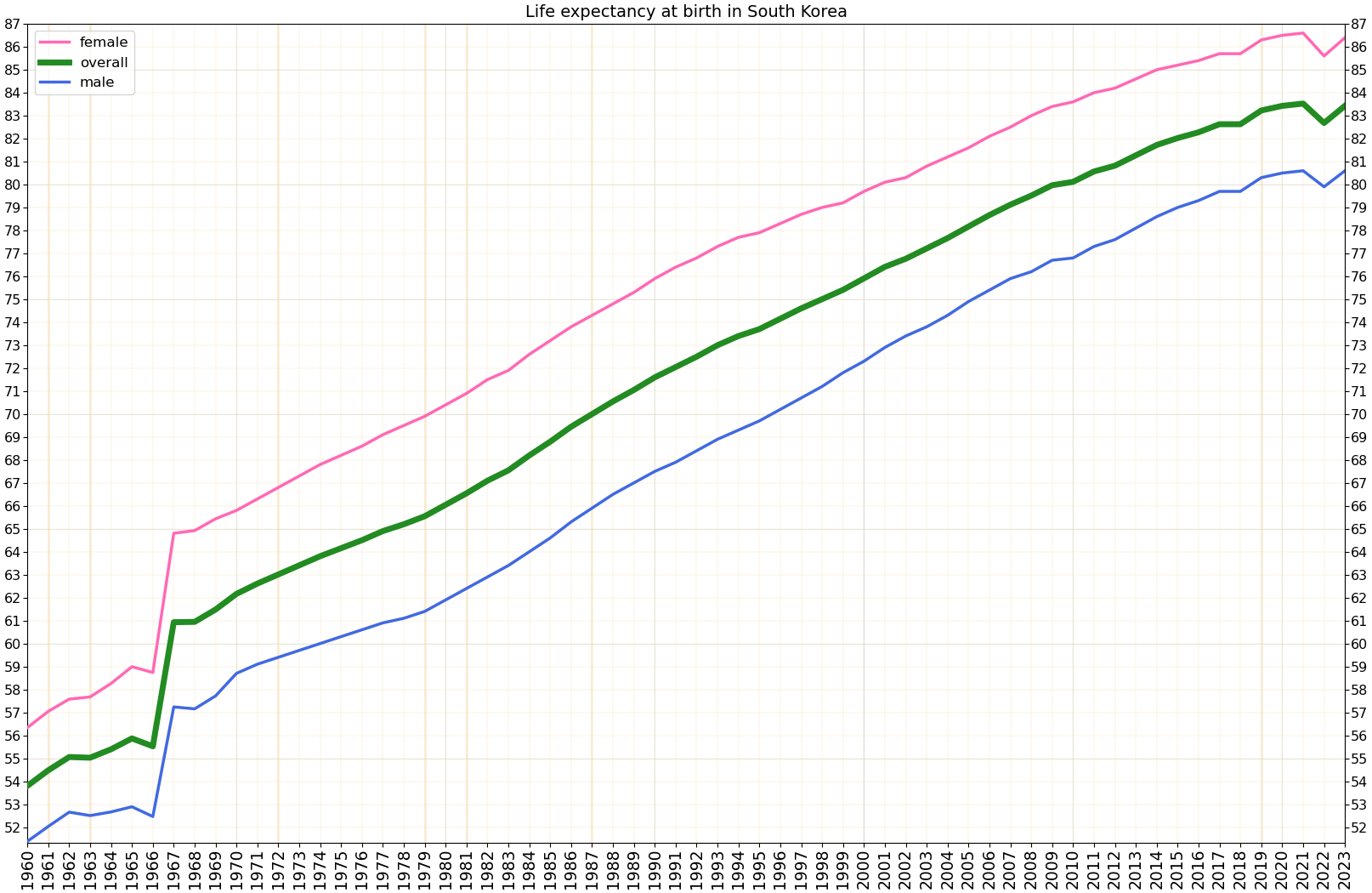
Development of life expectancy in South Korea according to estimation of the World Bank Group

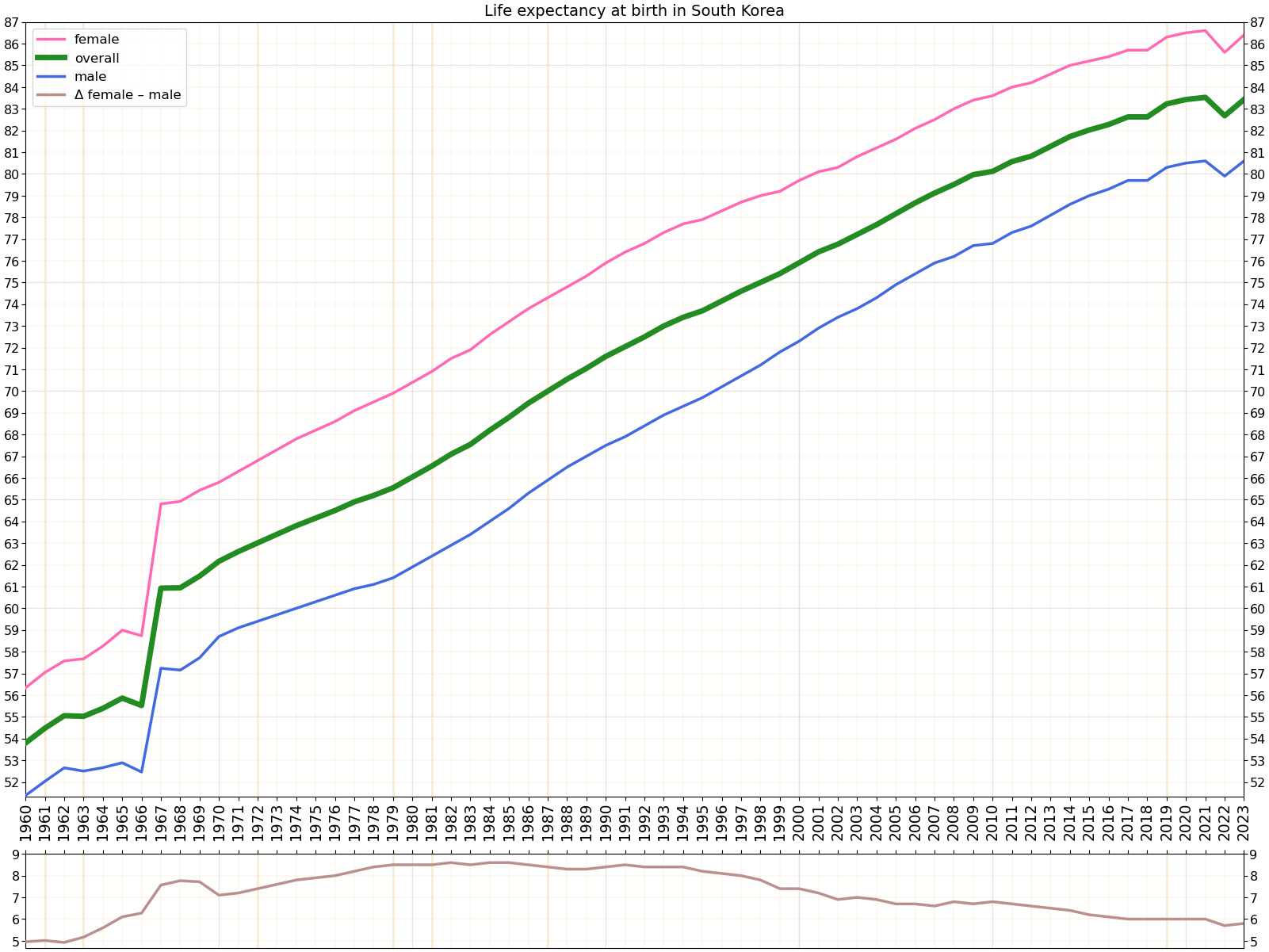
Life expectancy with calculated sex gap

Life expectancy in South Korea according to estimation of Our World in Data

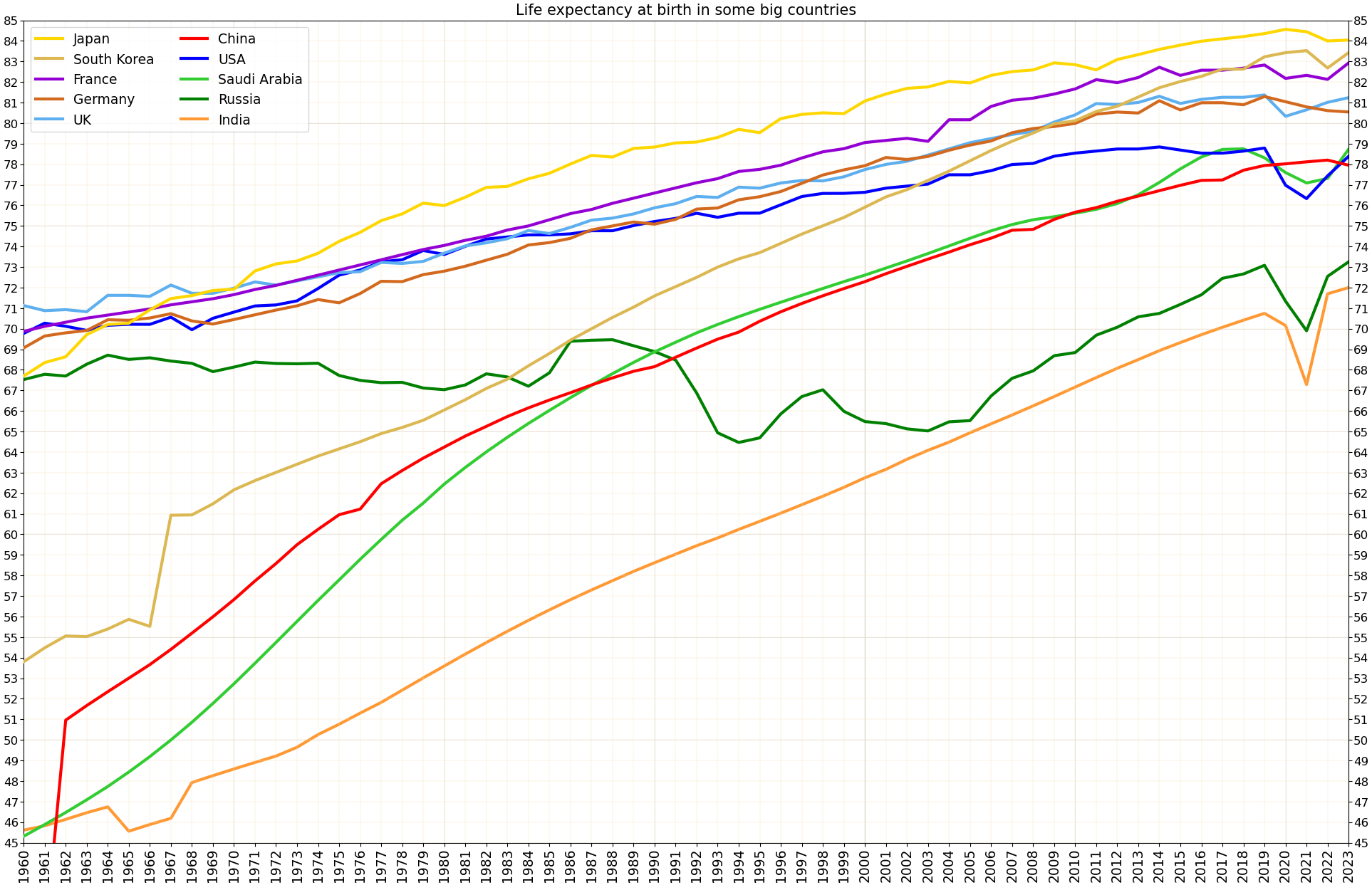
Development of life expectancy in South Korea in comparison to some big countries of the world

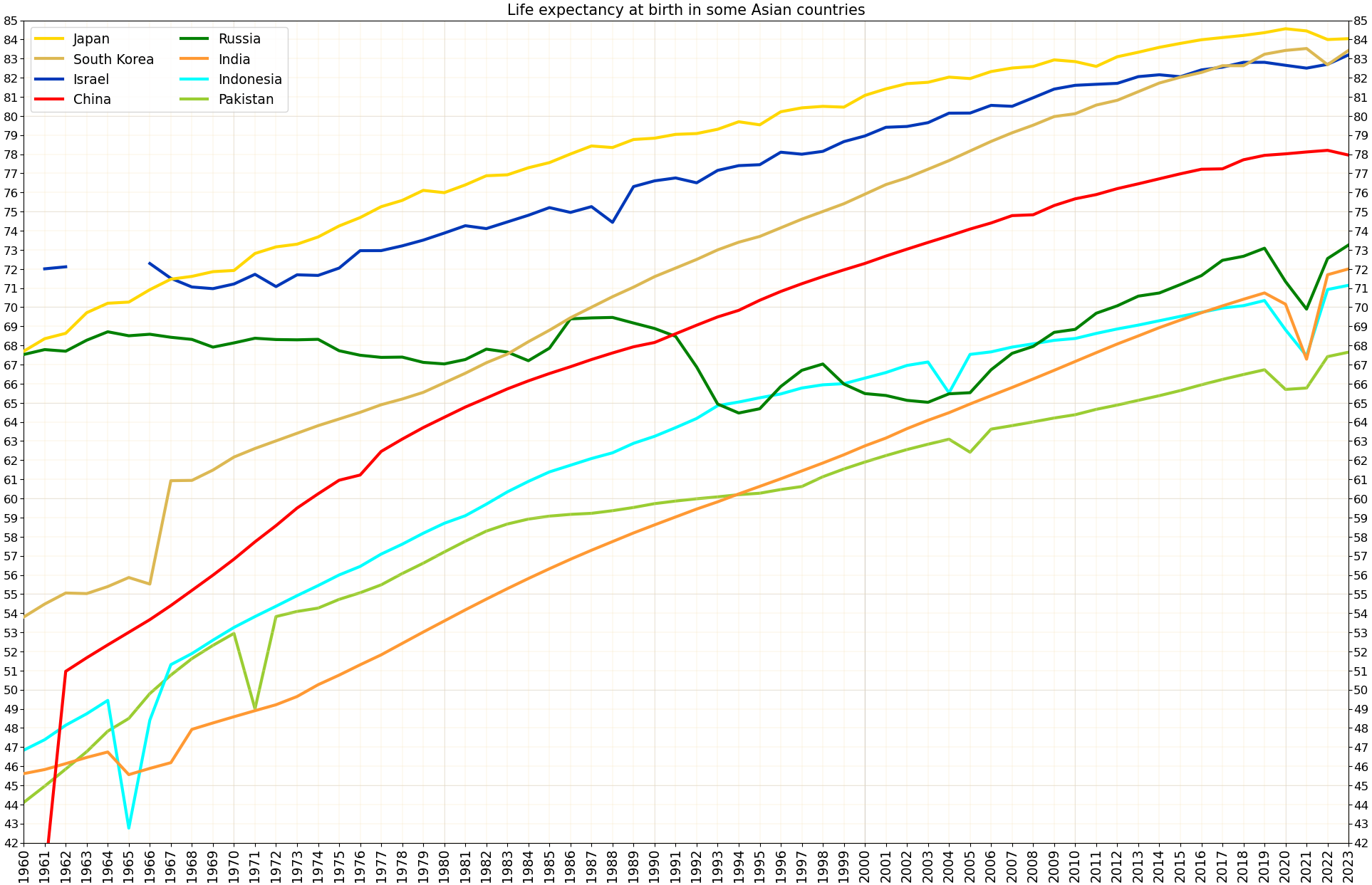
Development of life expectancy in South Korea in comparison to other big countries of Asia

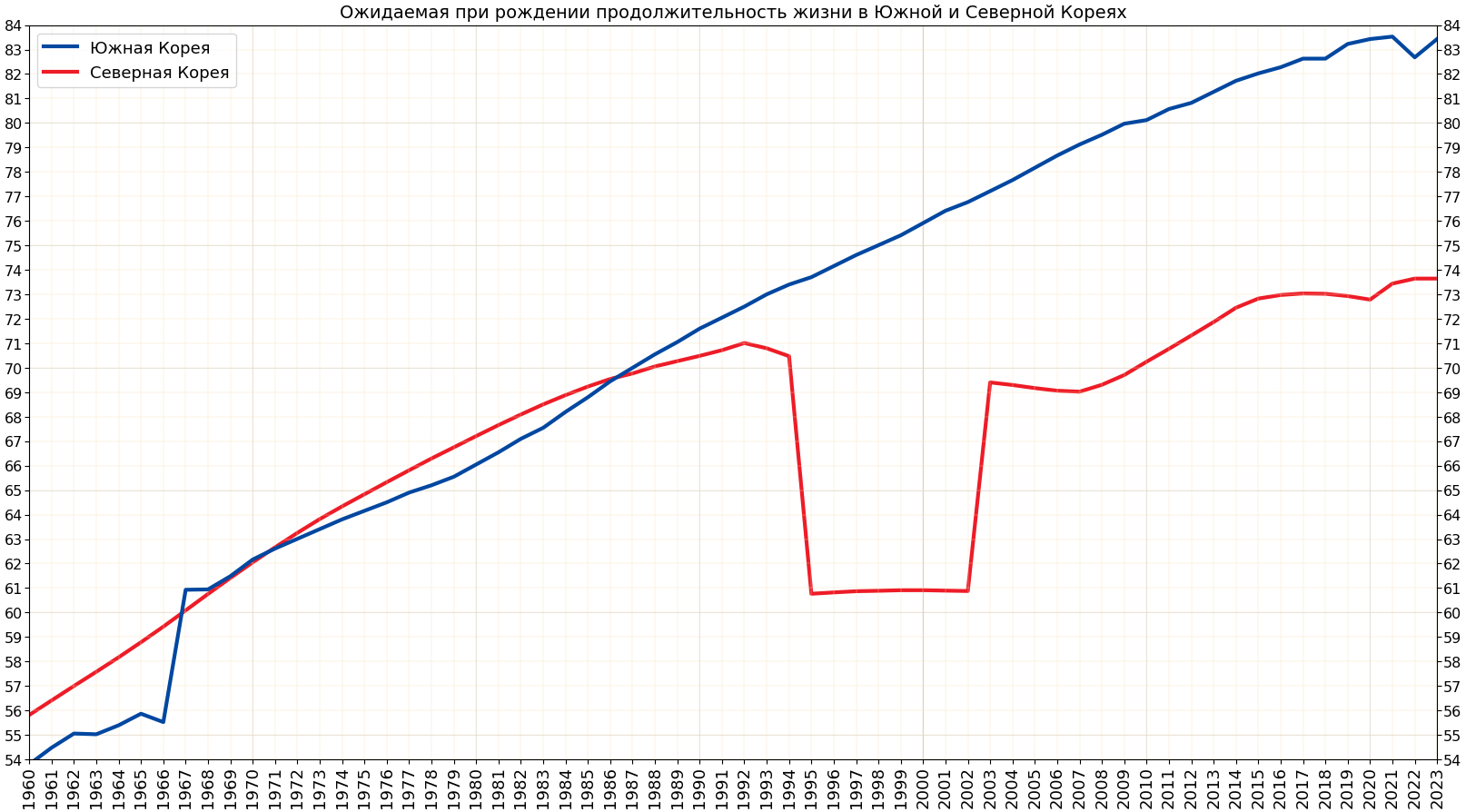
Comparison of life expectancy development in South Korea and North Korea

Alternative comparison of South Korea and North Korea
Life expectancy and healthy life expectancy in South Korea on the background of other countries of the world in 2019

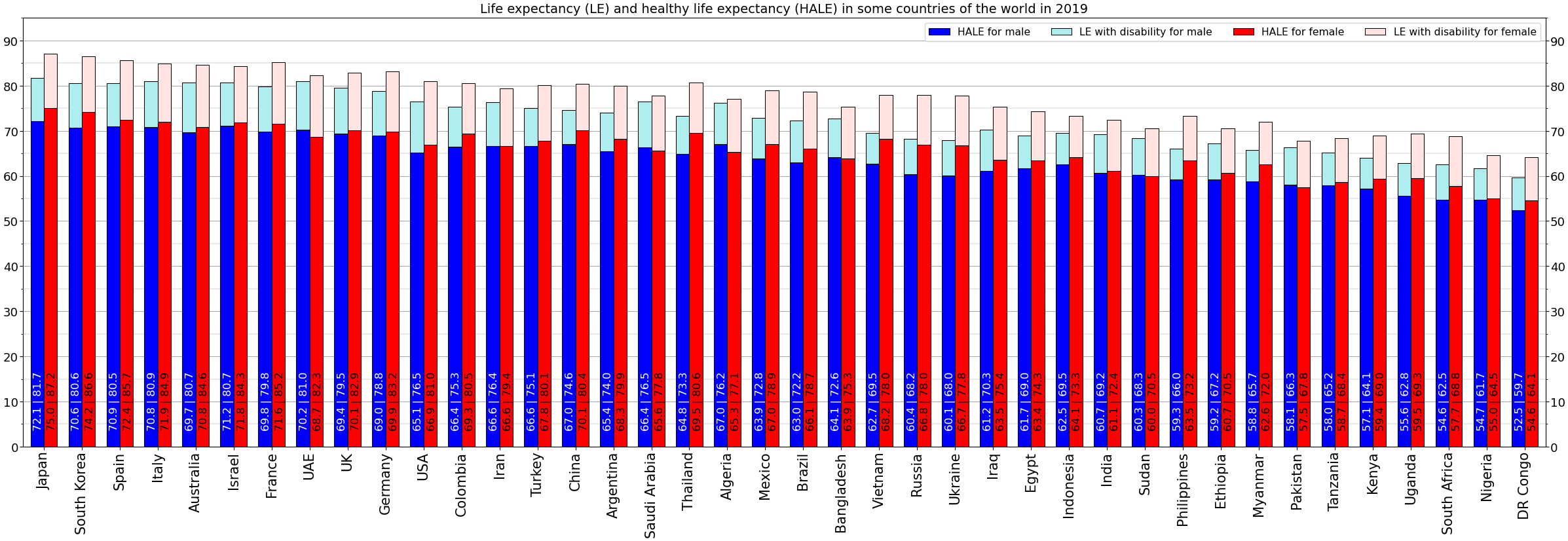
Life expectancy and healthy life expectancy for males and females separately
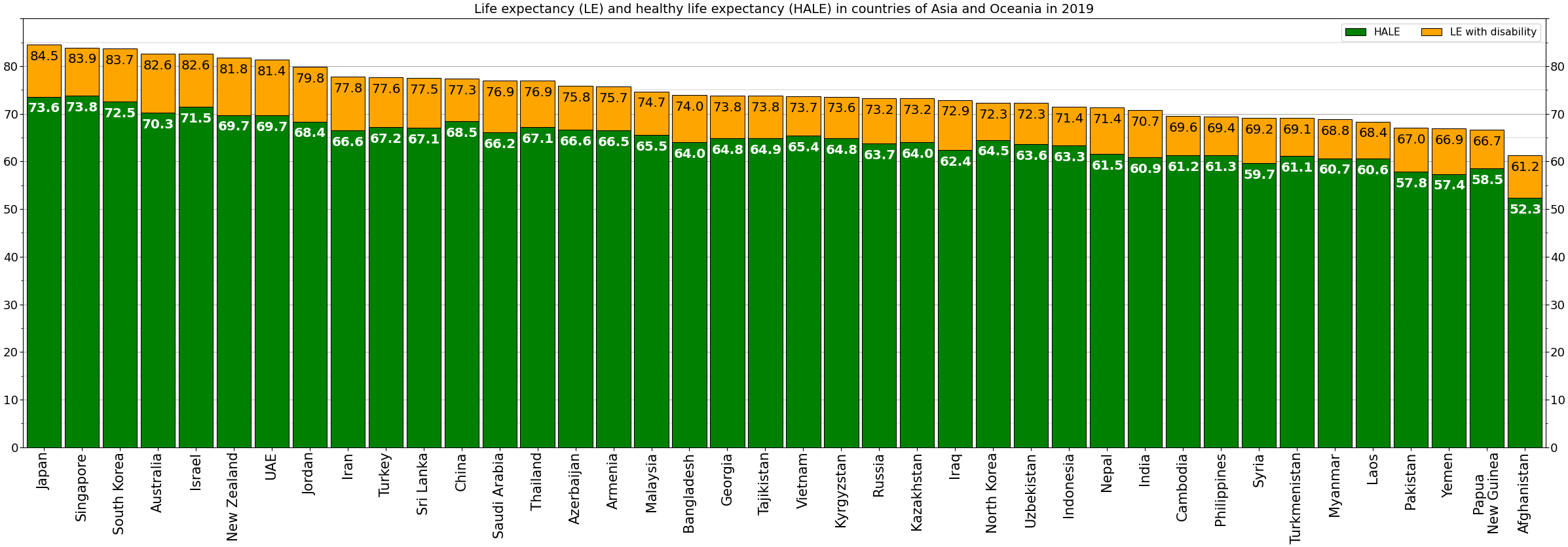
Life expectancy and healthy life expectancy in South Korea on the background of countries of Asia and Oceania in 2019

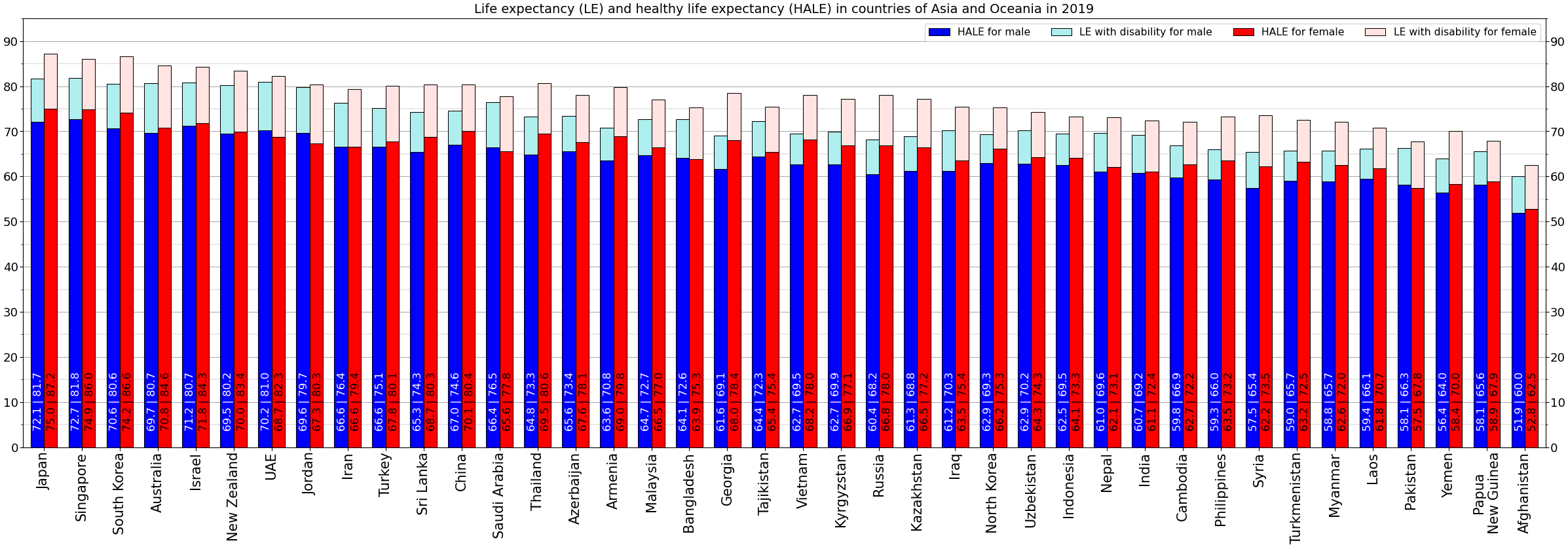
Life expectancy and healthy life expectancy for males and females separately

== See also ==
- List of countries by life expectancy
- List of Asian countries by life expectancy
- Demographics of South Korea
