= Climate of Turkey =

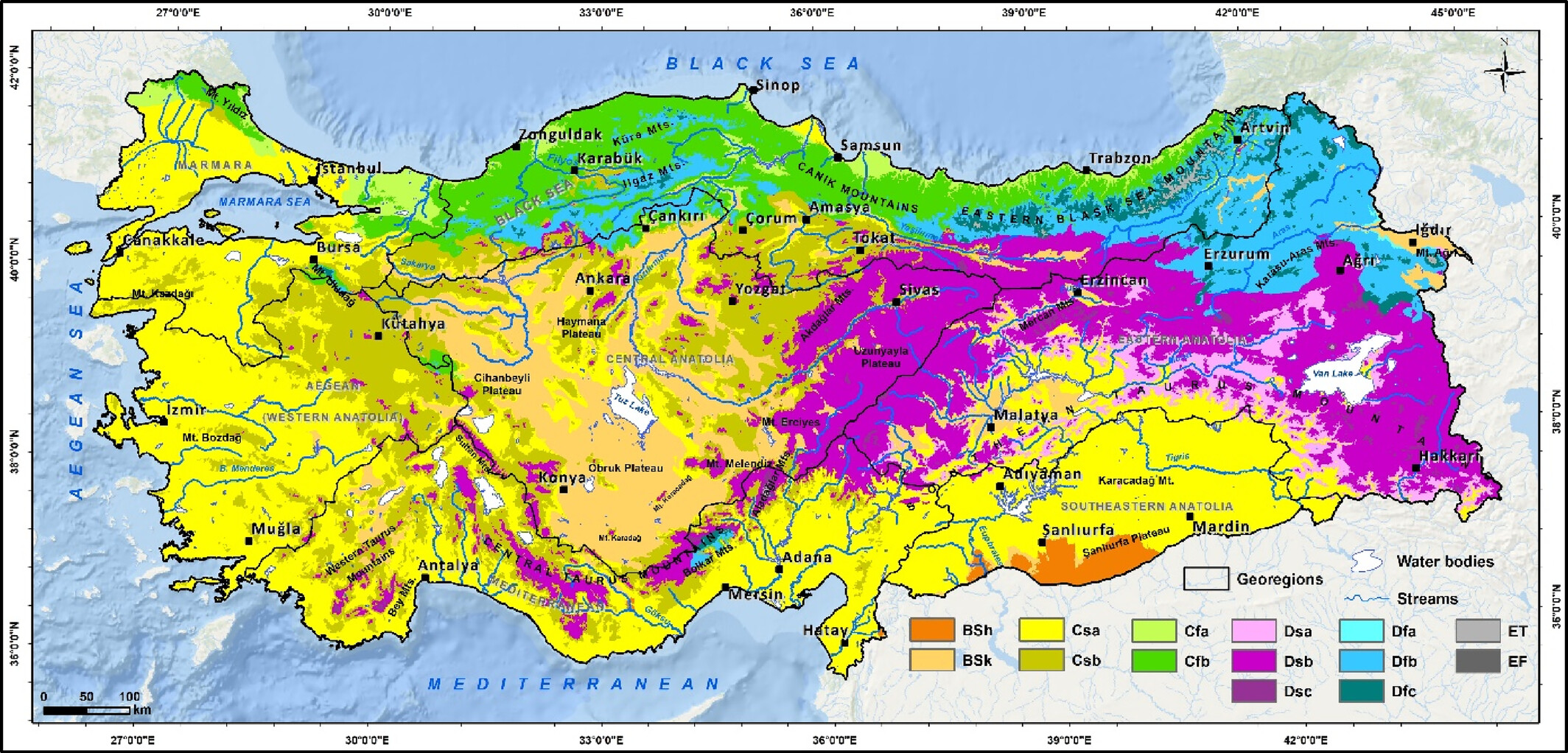
Köppen climate types of Turkey

Turkey's climate is varied and generally temperate, with the regions bordering the Mediterranean and Black Sea heavily affected by the coasts, and the interior being drier and more continental.

Coastal areas in the southern half of the country; including Antalya, İzmir, and Adana; have a typical Mediterranean climate, with hot, dry summers and mild, rainy winters. Coastal areas in the north are cooler and are either humid temperate or sub-Mediterranean, with cool, frequently rainy and occasionally snowy winters, and warm summers.

The lower plateaus of the interior are generally continental, with hot, dry summers, and cold, snowy winters. Winter precipitation varies widely, with lots of snow in areas like Bitlis, while rain-shadowed areas are semi-arid. On higher elevations, plateaus that nevertheless allow permanent settlement, like Kars and Ardahan, are high-continental and sometimes subalpine, with frigid, snowy winters, and mild, rainy summers.

Dry summers in the south and west, along with moderate aridity in the interior makes the country vulnerable to climate change.

== Regions ==
=== Mediterranean climates ===
==== "True" Mediterranean climate ====
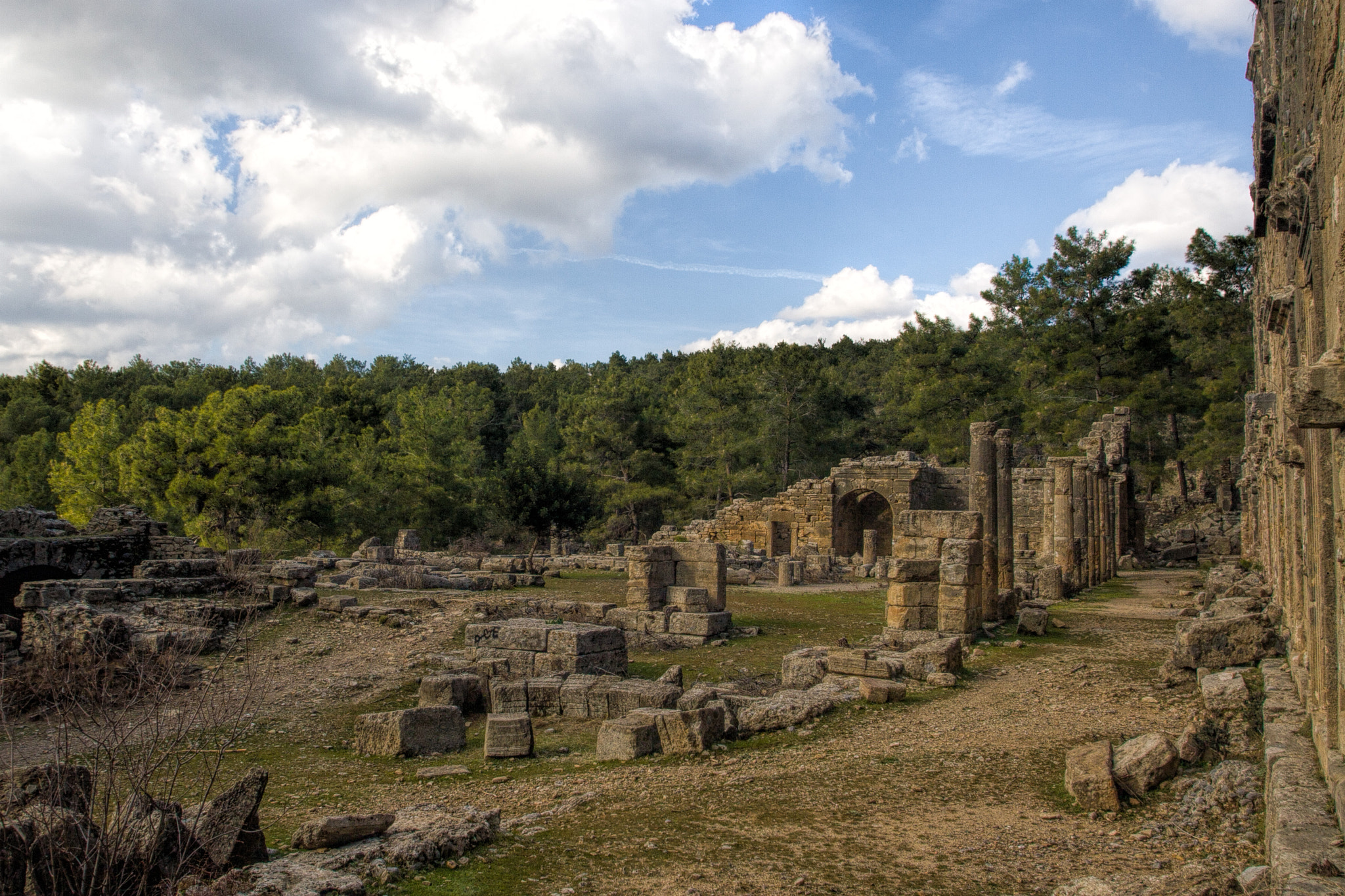
Pine forest, near ancient ruins.

A "true", or rather eu-Mediterranean (Köppen: Csa, Trewartha: Cs) climate exists on sea level from the coasts of Antakya to around Muğla, and north to around Manisa, which is generally considered to be its northern limit. Average temperatures range between 17–20 °C (63–68 °F); winters have means around 7–10 °C (45–50 °F), while summers have mean temperatures between 26–29 °C (79–84 °F). Precipitation amounts to around 600–1,200 millimetres (24–47 in), all of it rain. Summers get almost no rain, while winters receive plentiful, and sometimes copious amounts of it. Winter precipitation depends on local topography, with enclosed bays of convergent air, such as Antalya, getting almost twice the amount of rain as storm-protected areas such as Mersin.

Mountains around the region still show the Mediterranean rainfall pattern, but have mild summers and below-freezing temperatures during winter, creating a zone which may be termed oro-Mediterranean.

Climate data for Antalya (1991–2020, extremes 1930–2020)
Month	Jan	Feb	Mar	Apr	May	Jun	Jul	Aug	Sep	Oct	Nov	Dec	Year
Mean daily maximum °C (°F)	15.0 (59.0)	15.9 (60.6)	18.4 (65.1)	21.8 (71.2)	26.4 (79.5)	31.6 (88.9)	34.9 (94.8)	34.9 (94.8)	31.7 (89.1)	27.3 (81.1)	21.6 (70.9)	16.7 (62.1)	24.7 (76.5)
Daily mean °C (°F)	9.8 (49.6)	10.8 (51.4)	13.1 (55.6)	16.4 (61.5)	20.9 (69.6)	25.7 (78.3)	28.9 (84.0)	29.0 (84.2)	25.6 (78.1)	20.9 (69.6)	15.3 (59.5)	11.4 (52.5)	19.0 (66.2)
Mean daily minimum °C (°F)	5.9 (42.6)	6.5 (43.7)	8.3 (46.9)	11.3 (52.3)	15.7 (60.3)	20.1 (68.2)	23.4 (74.1)	23.7 (74.7)	20.1 (68.2)	15.9 (60.6)	10.7 (51.3)	7.5 (45.5)	14.1 (57.4)
Average precipitation mm (inches)	210.6 (8.29)	112.7 (4.44)	94.5 (3.72)	63.1 (2.48)	37.0 (1.46)	10.1 (0.40)	4.0 (0.16)	5.0 (0.20)	22.0 (0.87)	76.6 (3.02)	152.2 (5.99)	262.2 (10.32)	1,050 (41.34)
Average precipitation days	11.50	9.60	7.60	6.43	4.97	2.13	0.67	0.60	1.93	4.87	7.07	10.00	67.4
Mean monthly sunshine hours	151.9	161.0	201.5	231.0	291.4	330.0	344.1	325.5	273.0	232.5	177.0	145.7	2,864.6
Source: Turkish State Meteorological Service

==== Pre-Mediterranean climate ====
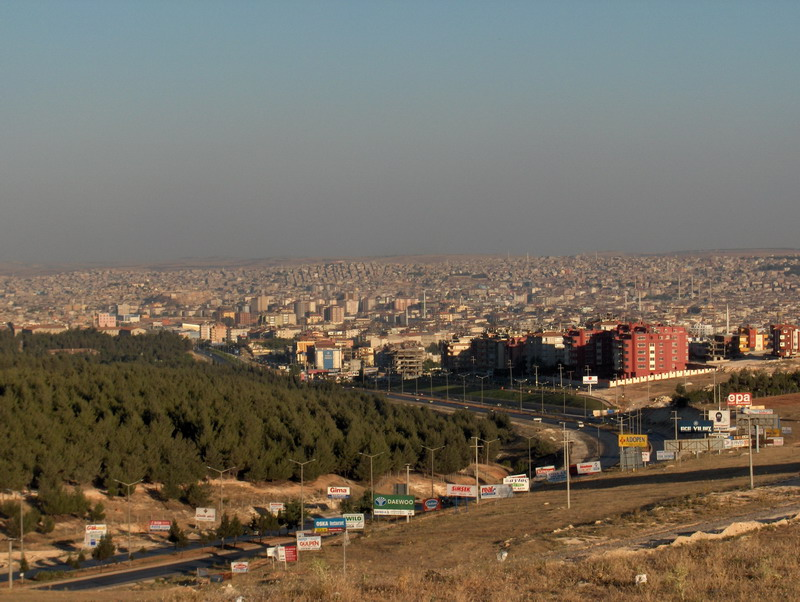
Drought-tolerant secondary (new-growth) pine woodland, Gaziantep.

A pre-Mediterranean climate (Turkish: Akdeniz sâhil ardı iklimi, Köppen: Csa, Trewartha: Cs/Do/Dc) exists in relatively continental areas influenced by the Mediterranean climatic system, notably around the inner Aegean and Southeastern Anatolia. Average temperatures range between 14–18 °C (57–64 °F) with winter means around 1–6 °C (34–43 °F), and summers as hot as (or hotter than) the Mediterranean. Rainfall follows the general pattern of the Mediterranean region, but sunshine is sometimes noticeably lower, and precipitation amounts are lower than the Mediterranean region, between 400–800 millimetres (16–31 in). Snow also falls with some regularity in this area, unlike the coastal Mediterranean region.

Climate data for Diyarbakır (1991–2020, extremes 1929–2020)
Month	Jan	Feb	Mar	Apr	May	Jun	Jul	Aug	Sep	Oct	Nov	Dec	Year
Mean daily maximum °C (°F)	7.3 (45.1)	9.6 (49.3)	15.0 (59.0)	20.5 (68.9)	26.8 (80.2)	34.4 (93.9)	38.9 (102.0)	38.7 (101.7)	33.4 (92.1)	25.7 (78.3)	16.3 (61.3)	9.2 (48.6)	23.0 (73.4)
Daily mean °C (°F)	2.1 (35.8)	3.8 (38.8)	8.7 (47.7)	13.5 (56.3)	18.9 (66.0)	26.3 (79.3)	31.0 (87.8)	30.5 (86.9)	25.0 (77.0)	17.8 (64.0)	9.3 (48.7)	3.8 (38.8)	15.9 (60.6)
Mean daily minimum °C (°F)	−2.0 (28.4)	−1.1 (30.0)	2.6 (36.7)	6.6 (43.9)	10.9 (51.6)	16.8 (62.2)	21.7 (71.1)	21.2 (70.2)	15.9 (60.6)	10.4 (50.7)	3.8 (38.8)	−0.5 (31.1)	8.9 (48.0)
Average precipitation mm (inches)	63.6 (2.50)	66.8 (2.63)	67.5 (2.66)	63.1 (2.48)	50.0 (1.97)	10.8 (0.43)	1.0 (0.04)	0.4 (0.02)	8.4 (0.33)	37.3 (1.47)	54.3 (2.14)	75.2 (2.96)	498.4 (19.62)
Average precipitation days	11.77	11.10	12.80	12.43	11.40	3.80	0.83	0.60	2.13	7.00	8.20	11.83	93.9
Mean monthly sunshine hours	124.0	135.6	173.6	210.0	282.1	348.0	362.7	341.0	279.0	220.1	165.0	114.7	2,755.8
Source: Turkish State Meteorological Service

=== Transitional zone ===
==== Marmara dry-summer temperate climate ====
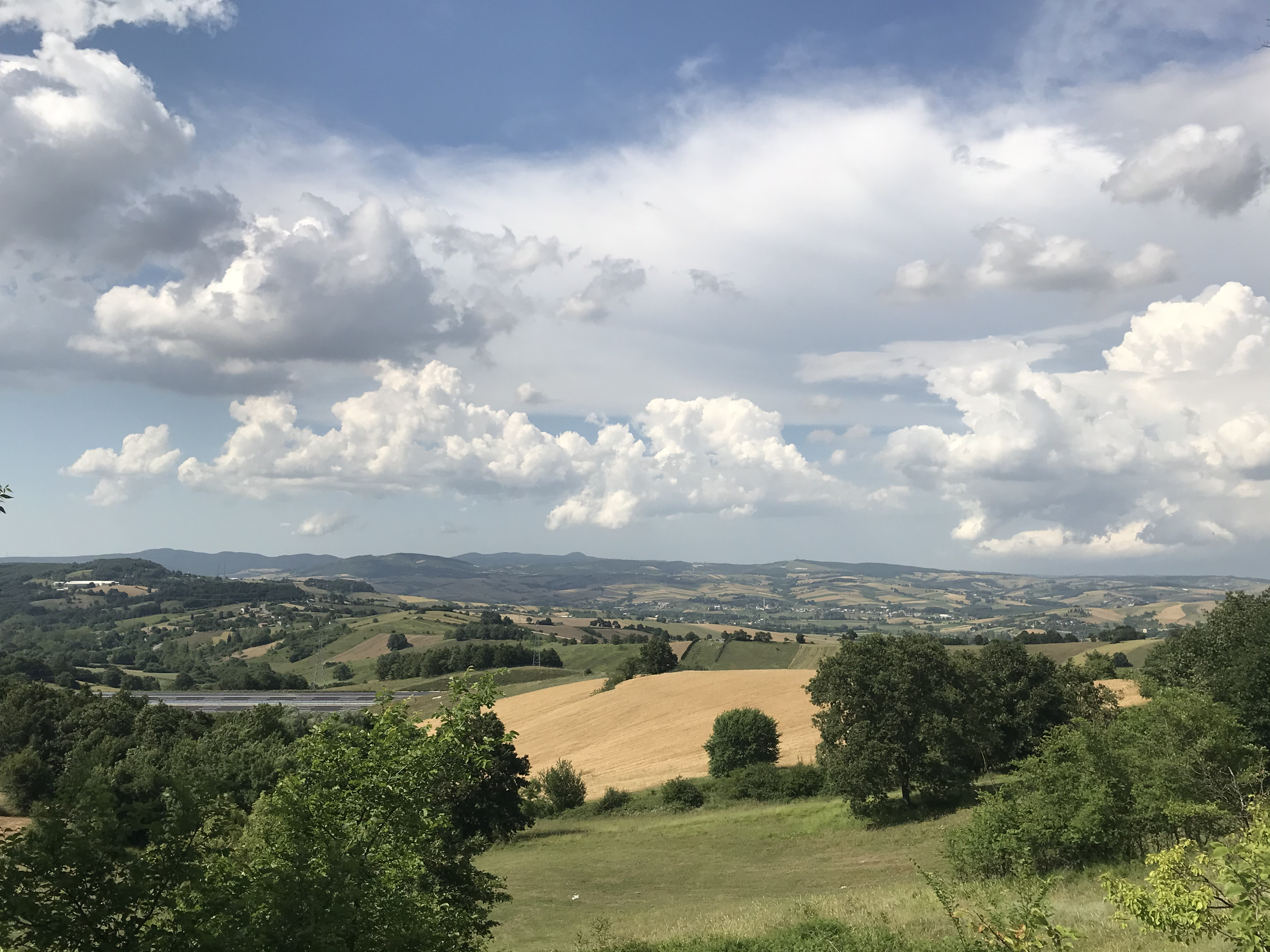
Sub-Mediterranean, deciduous vegetation, near İzmit.

The climate around the Marmara Sea (Turkish: Marmara geçiş iklimi, lit. 'Marmara transitional climate', Köppen: Csa/Csb/Cfa/Cfb, Trewartha: Cs/Cf/Do) is complex, transitional and often microclimatic. It wraps around the sea, covering Bursa, Bilecik, southern İzmit and İstanbul, as well as Tekirdağ. Often of a meso- or supra-Mediterranean quality at sea-level; its vegetation at sea level is similar to the lower mountains of the "true" Mediterranean region, with heat-tolerant broadleaf oaks and occasional mesophilous trees, such as beech. Therefore, it is generally considered mild-temperate and not subtropical in Turkish sources and furthermore, Bohn, in a survey of European vegetation and climate, calls the climate sub-continental sub-Mediterranean.

Its average temperatures range around 12–15 °C (54–59 °F) at sea level. Its summers are generally cool for the Mediterranean, but warm for oceanic climates, with means around 20–25 °C (68–77 °F), varying on a microclimatic level. Winter means range between 2–6 °C (36–43 °F), with a noticeable decrease further inland. Precipitation amounts to 600–1,100 millimetres (24–43 in). Winters are very cloudy, with the amount of rainy days far surpassing much of Europe; while snow falls occasionally, often with sea-effect. Summers are moderately dry, but feature occasional thunderstorms, sometimes severe; along with the Black Sea climatic region further east, areas around the Marmara Sea have their peak thunderstorm activity in early and late summer.

Mountains here often quickly transition into subalpine climates, most notably Uludağ.

Climate data for Istanbul (normals 1991–2020)
Month	Jan	Feb	Mar	Apr	May	Jun	Jul	Aug	Sep	Oct	Nov	Dec	Year
Mean daily maximum °C (°F)	8.8 (47.8)	9.4 (48.9)	12.0 (53.6)	16.1 (61.0)	21.0 (69.8)	25.7 (78.3)	28.0 (82.4)	28.2 (82.8)	24.6 (76.3)	19.9 (67.8)	15.0 (59.0)	10.7 (51.3)	18.3 (64.9)
Daily mean °C (°F)	5.9 (42.6)	6.1 (43.0)	8.0 (46.4)	11.5 (52.7)	16.3 (61.3)	21.1 (70.0)	23.7 (74.7)	24.2 (75.6)	20.5 (68.9)	16.2 (61.2)	11.7 (53.1)	7.9 (46.2)	14.4 (58.0)
Mean daily minimum °C (°F)	3.6 (38.5)	3.5 (38.3)	4.9 (40.8)	8.1 (46.6)	12.8 (55.0)	17.4 (63.3)	20.3 (68.5)	21.2 (70.2)	17.4 (63.3)	13.6 (56.5)	9.2 (48.6)	5.5 (41.9)	11.0 (51.8)
Average precipitation mm (inches)	96.1 (3.78)	87.7 (3.45)	69.8 (2.75)	45.1 (1.78)	37.1 (1.46)	44.7 (1.76)	36.3 (1.43)	43.5 (1.71)	81.3 (3.20)	98.3 (3.87)	100.5 (3.96)	124.8 (4.91)	865.2 (34.06)
Average precipitation days (≥ 0.1 mm)	16.9	15.2	13.2	10.0	7.4	7.0	4.7	5.1	8.1	12.3	13.9	17.5	131.3
Mean monthly sunshine hours	68.2	89.6	142.6	180.0	248.0	297.6	319.3	288.3	234.0	158.1	93.0	62.0	2,180.7

==== Thracian sub-humid climate ====
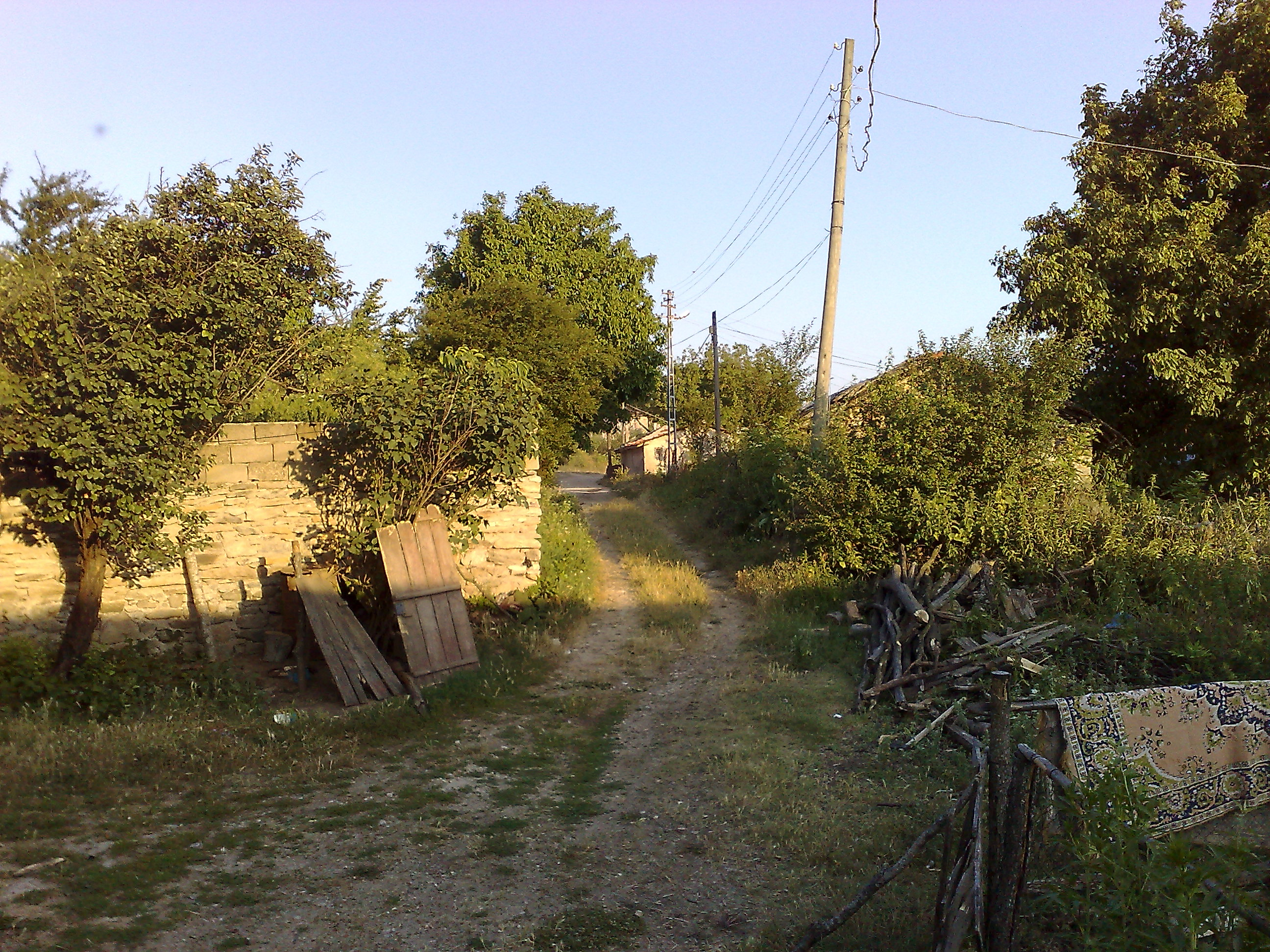
Shrubs and low-growing trees, Kırklareli.

Inland regions northwest of the Marmara Sea have a transitional, sub-humid climate (Köppen: Csa/Cfa, Trewartha: Cs/Cf/Do), with average temperatures matching those of the Marmara Sea, albeit with colder, snowier winters and hotter summers. The vegetation here is pre-steppic, mostly oak savanna.

This area does have similarities to the pre-Mediterranean climate further south, but its lower sunshine, light winter precipitation and milder, wetter summers distinguish the two. The area's thunderstorm season peaks in May and early June, resulting in a slightly earlier season than that of the Marmara Sea.

Climate data for Kırklareli (1991–2020, extremes 1959–2020)
Month	Jan	Feb	Mar	Apr	May	Jun	Jul	Aug	Sep	Oct	Nov	Dec	Year
Mean daily maximum °C (°F)	7.2 (45.0)	9.2 (48.6)	12.8 (55.0)	18.4 (65.1)	24.0 (75.2)	28.7 (83.7)	31.3 (88.3)	31.5 (88.7)	26.6 (79.9)	20.1 (68.2)	14.0 (57.2)	8.7 (47.7)	19.4 (66.9)
Daily mean °C (°F)	3.3 (37.9)	4.5 (40.1)	7.5 (45.5)	12.4 (54.3)	17.6 (63.7)	22.1 (71.8)	24.6 (76.3)	24.6 (76.3)	19.9 (67.8)	14.6 (58.3)	9.5 (49.1)	5.0 (41.0)	13.8 (56.8)
Mean daily minimum °C (°F)	0.3 (32.5)	1.0 (33.8)	3.4 (38.1)	7.3 (45.1)	12.0 (53.6)	16.1 (61.0)	18.4 (65.1)	18.6 (65.5)	14.5 (58.1)	10.3 (50.5)	6.0 (42.8)	2.1 (35.8)	9.2 (48.6)
Average precipitation mm (inches)	61.9 (2.44)	48.3 (1.90)	48.8 (1.92)	39.1 (1.54)	53.6 (2.11)	56.2 (2.21)	34.2 (1.35)	19.1 (0.75)	39.9 (1.57)	60.6 (2.39)	62.4 (2.46)	61.7 (2.43)	585.8 (23.06)
Average precipitation days	9.93	8.73	10.20	10.50	10.43	9.07	5.67	3.67	5.70	8.67	9.07	11.13	102.8
Mean monthly sunshine hours	71.3	81.9	130.2	165.0	226.3	234.0	266.6	266.6	189.0	136.4	90.0	65.1	1,922.4
Source: Turkish State Meteorological Service

=== Humid maritime climates ===
==== Western Pontic climate ====
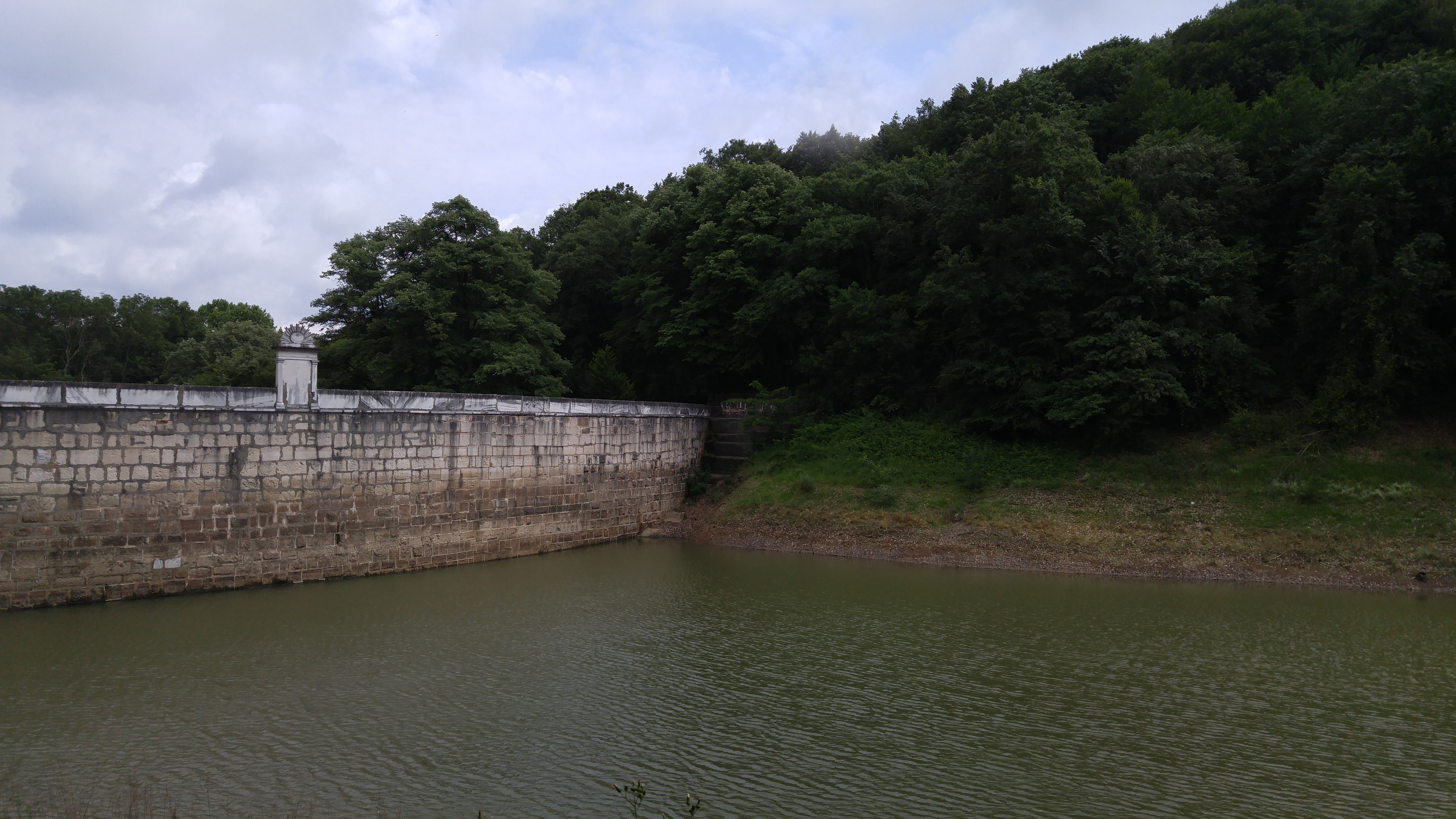
Quercus petraea and Fagus sylvatica forest, north of Istanbul.

A mild, humid temperate climate (Köppen: Cfa/Cfb, Trewartha: Cf/Do) exists from the northern coast of Istanbul to İnebolu, at sea level around the coast of the Black Sea. Its vegetation is deciduous broadleaf, and resembles the supra-Mediterranean zone at sea level, although it is part of a different floristic zone, specifically the Euxinic one.

Its average temperatures range around 12–14 °C (54–57 °F) at sea level, with summer means around 20–23 °C (68–73 °F) and winter means around 4–6 °C (39–43 °F). Rainfall is well-distributed and quite frequent, generally around 900–1,500 millimetres (35–59 in) with a spring drying pattern, instead of a summer-dry one. Winter snowfall is about the same amount as the Marmara region, but winter means are raised by Foehn winds.

Climate data for Zonguldak (1991–2020, extremes 1939–2020)
Month	Jan	Feb	Mar	Apr	May	Jun	Jul	Aug	Sep	Oct	Nov	Dec	Year
Mean daily maximum °C (°F)	9.2 (48.6)	9.7 (49.5)	11.7 (53.1)	15.2 (59.4)	19.3 (66.7)	23.6 (74.5)	25.8 (78.4)	26.2 (79.2)	23.2 (73.8)	19.2 (66.6)	15.2 (59.4)	11.5 (52.7)	17.5 (63.5)
Daily mean °C (°F)	6.3 (43.3)	6.4 (43.5)	8.1 (46.6)	11.5 (52.7)	15.7 (60.3)	19.9 (67.8)	22.4 (72.3)	22.7 (72.9)	19.5 (67.1)	15.7 (60.3)	11.7 (53.1)	8.3 (46.9)	14.0 (57.2)
Mean daily minimum °C (°F)	3.8 (38.8)	3.6 (38.5)	5.2 (41.4)	8.3 (46.9)	12.6 (54.7)	16.5 (61.7)	18.8 (65.8)	19.2 (66.6)	16.1 (61.0)	12.8 (55.0)	8.9 (48.0)	5.7 (42.3)	11.0 (51.8)
Average precipitation mm (inches)	127.7 (5.03)	93.9 (3.70)	96.4 (3.80)	57.1 (2.25)	59.5 (2.34)	83.0 (3.27)	69.7 (2.74)	81.6 (3.21)	125.9 (4.96)	147.5 (5.81)	134.5 (5.30)	161.8 (6.37)	1,238.6 (48.76)
Average precipitation days	18.13	15.93	15.60	12.73	11.37	9.33	7.17	7.03	10.17	12.80	13.60	18.30	152.2
Mean monthly sunshine hours	62.0	73.5	108.5	153.0	195.3	243.0	275.9	257.3	189.0	130.2	90.0	65.1	1,842.8
Source: Turkish State Meteorological Service

==== Central Pontic climate ====
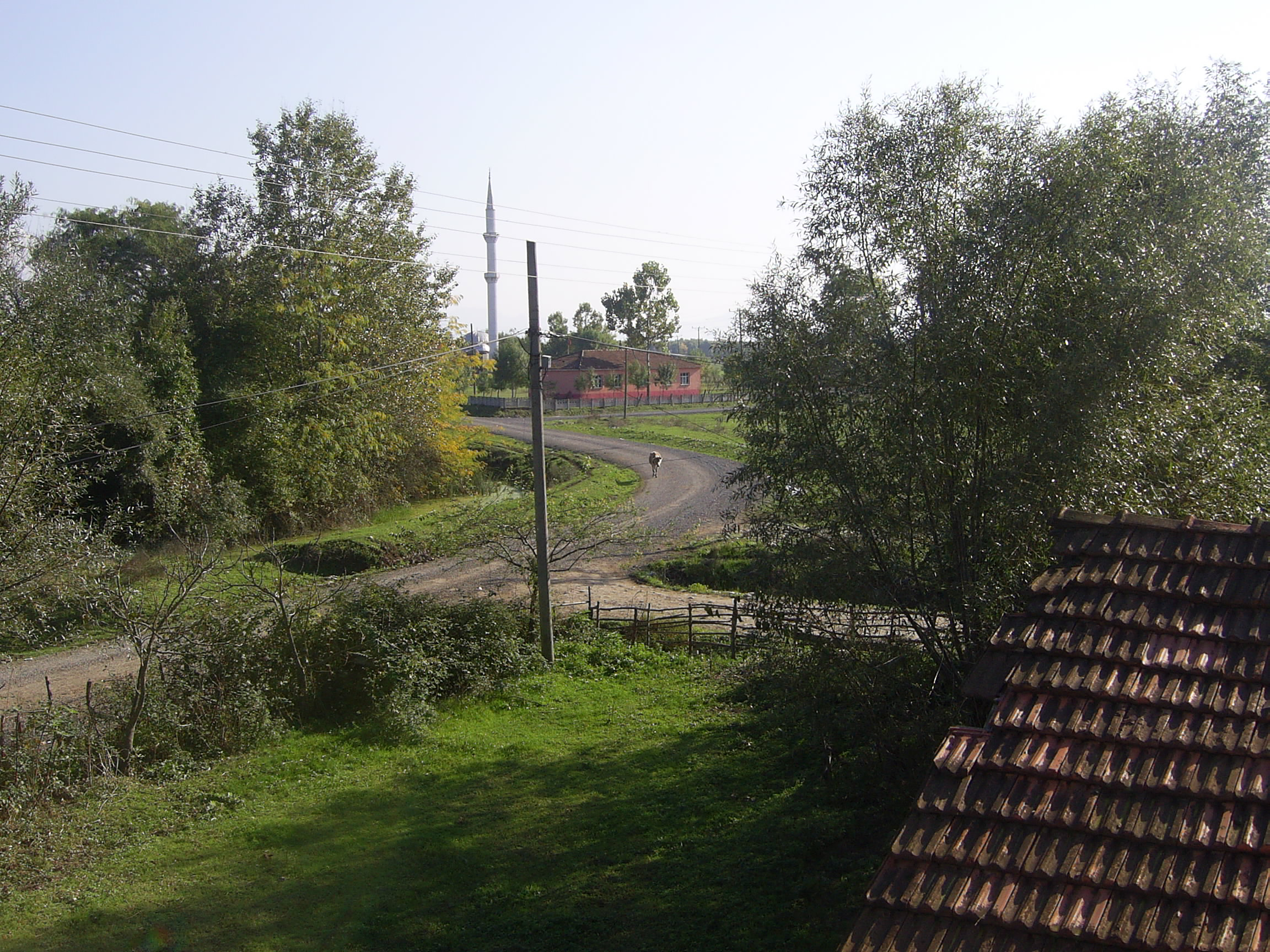
Temperate and meso-Mediterranean vegetation together, near Samsun.

In sheltered locations around Sinop and Samsun, the climate (Köppen: Cfa, Trewartha: Cf) is noticeably drier and warmer than the Western Pontic zone, but somewhat cooler, and much drier than the Eastern Pontic zone. Meso-Mediterranean vegetation resurfaces here, and coexists with broadleaf forest. Average temperatures range around 13–15 °C (55–59 °F), with summer means around 22–25 °C (72–77 °F) and winter means around 6–8 °C (43–46 °F). Rainfall follows the general distribution of the region, but the area is less humid than expected in all seasons.

Climate data for Sinop (1991–2020, extremes 1936–2020)
Month	Jan	Feb	Mar	Apr	May	Jun	Jul	Aug	Sep	Oct	Nov	Dec	Year
Mean daily maximum °C (°F)	9.7 (49.5)	9.8 (49.6)	11.3 (52.3)	14.5 (58.1)	19.0 (66.2)	24.0 (75.2)	26.8 (80.2)	27.6 (81.7)	24.1 (75.4)	19.9 (67.8)	15.6 (60.1)	12.0 (53.6)	17.9 (64.2)
Daily mean °C (°F)	7.1 (44.8)	6.8 (44.2)	8.1 (46.6)	11.0 (51.8)	15.5 (59.9)	20.5 (68.9)	23.6 (74.5)	24.3 (75.7)	20.8 (69.4)	16.9 (62.4)	12.6 (54.7)	9.2 (48.6)	14.7 (58.5)
Mean daily minimum °C (°F)	4.9 (40.8)	4.4 (39.9)	5.6 (42.1)	8.4 (47.1)	12.7 (54.9)	17.6 (63.7)	20.6 (69.1)	21.4 (70.5)	18.1 (64.6)	14.4 (57.9)	10.0 (50.0)	6.9 (44.4)	12.1 (53.8)
Average precipitation mm (inches)	73.4 (2.89)	54.4 (2.14)	60.1 (2.37)	37.3 (1.47)	34.5 (1.36)	39.1 (1.54)	35.5 (1.40)	37.2 (1.46)	74.6 (2.94)	94.4 (3.72)	82.9 (3.26)	104.4 (4.11)	727.8 (28.65)
Average precipitation days	15.80	13.00	13.77	11.37	10.17	8.47	5.83	6.30	10.10	12.73	12.17	16.13	135.8
Mean monthly sunshine hours	62.0	76.3	117.8	159.0	186.0	234.0	269.7	248.0	183.0	124.0	87.0	58.9	1,805.7
Source: Turkish State Meteorological Service

==== Eastern Pontic climate ====
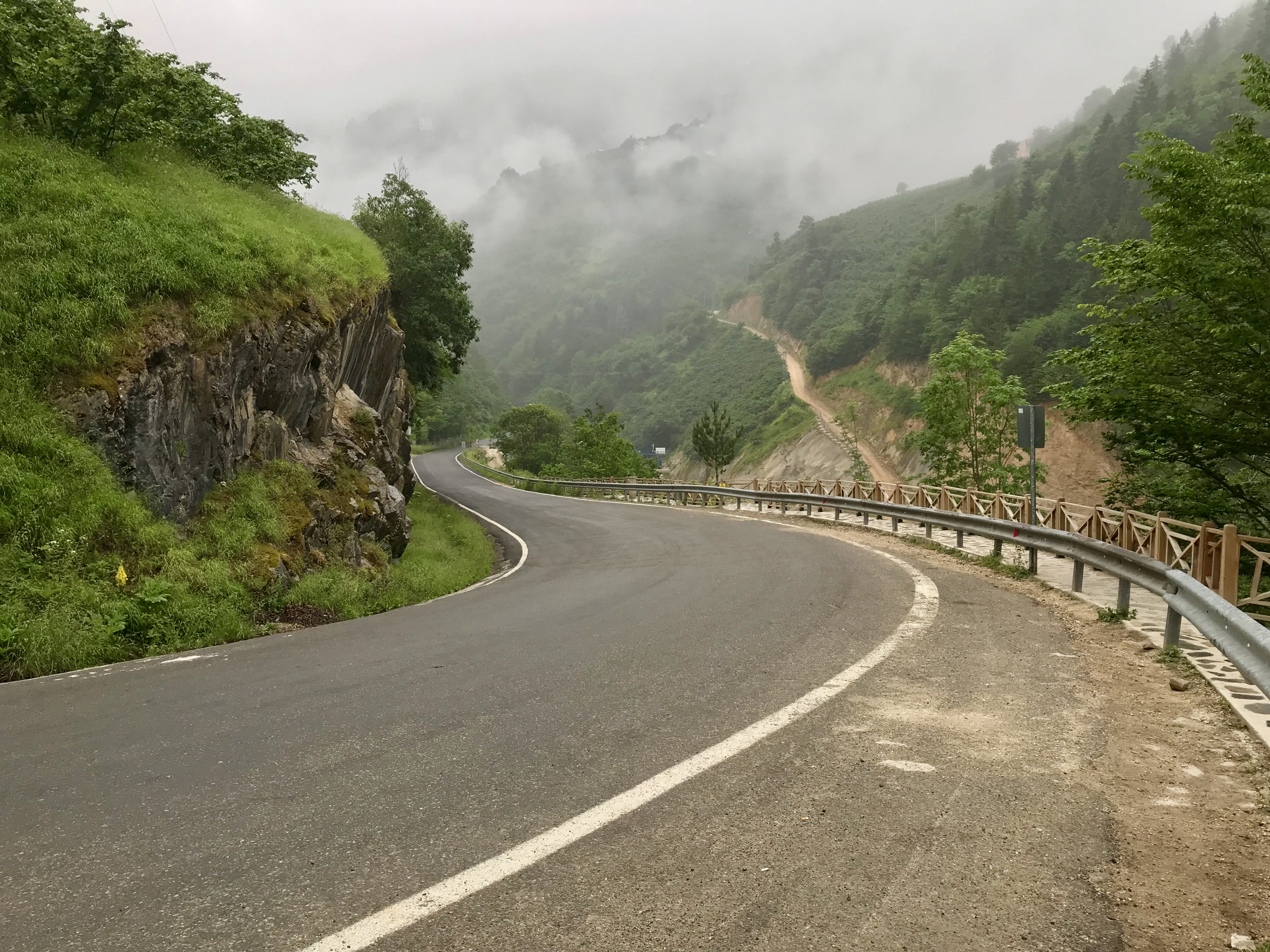
Temperate cloud forest, near Giresun.

As the Black Sea coast assumes a southwest-northeast direction once again, rainfall increases, and forms the near-subtropical, extremely humid climate (Köppen: Cfa, Trewartha: Cf) prevalent in the eastern Black Sea region. Featuring temperate rainforests, its temperatures are very slightly warmer than the transitional zone further west, but rainfall in this region is nearly constant in frequency, varying only by intensity. Rainfall amounts are also quite copious at 1,500–2,500 millimetres (59–98 in), with a spring drying pattern. Some parts of the region get below 1,200 hours of sunshine, values far below Western Europe and more comparable to subpolar regions. Snowfall is somewhat common in the coast between the months of December and March, snowing for a week or two, and it can be heavy once it snows (this is due to the "lake-effect snow").

Mountains in this region have a perhumid, alpine climate with verdant meadows (Turkish: yayla) alternating with krummholz and boreal forests.

Climate data for Rize (1991–2020, extremes 1928–2020)
Month	Jan	Feb	Mar	Apr	May	Jun	Jul	Aug	Sep	Oct	Nov	Dec	Year
Mean daily maximum °C (°F)	11.0 (51.8)	11.1 (52.0)	12.9 (55.2)	15.9 (60.6)	20.2 (68.4)	24.9 (76.8)	27.4 (81.3)	28.1 (82.6)	25.4 (77.7)	21.4 (70.5)	16.7 (62.1)	13.0 (55.4)	19.0 (66.2)
Daily mean °C (°F)	6.9 (44.4)	6.8 (44.2)	8.7 (47.7)	11.8 (53.2)	16.6 (61.9)	21.2 (70.2)	23.8 (74.8)	24.5 (76.1)	21.2 (70.2)	17.2 (63.0)	12.1 (53.8)	8.7 (47.7)	15.0 (59.0)
Mean daily minimum °C (°F)	3.9 (39.0)	3.7 (38.7)	5.4 (41.7)	8.5 (47.3)	13.2 (55.8)	17.5 (63.5)	20.5 (68.9)	21.2 (70.2)	17.7 (63.9)	13.9 (57.0)	8.8 (47.8)	5.6 (42.1)	11.7 (53.1)
Average precipitation mm (inches)	223.1 (8.78)	170.5 (6.71)	154.0 (6.06)	90.5 (3.56)	96.6 (3.80)	148.4 (5.84)	163.4 (6.43)	192.5 (7.58)	265.1 (10.44)	307.3 (12.10)	246.0 (9.69)	252.1 (9.93)	2,309.5 (90.93)
Average precipitation days	15.53	14.43	16.83	15.63	15.73	15.97	14.37	15.10	15.27	15.73	13.60	15.27	183.5
Mean monthly sunshine hours	62.0	84.8	114.7	144.0	179.8	195.0	176.7	161.2	156.0	127.1	87.0	58.9	1,547.2
Source: Turkish State Meteorological Service

=== Continental climates ===
==== Pre-Pontic sub-humid continental climate ====
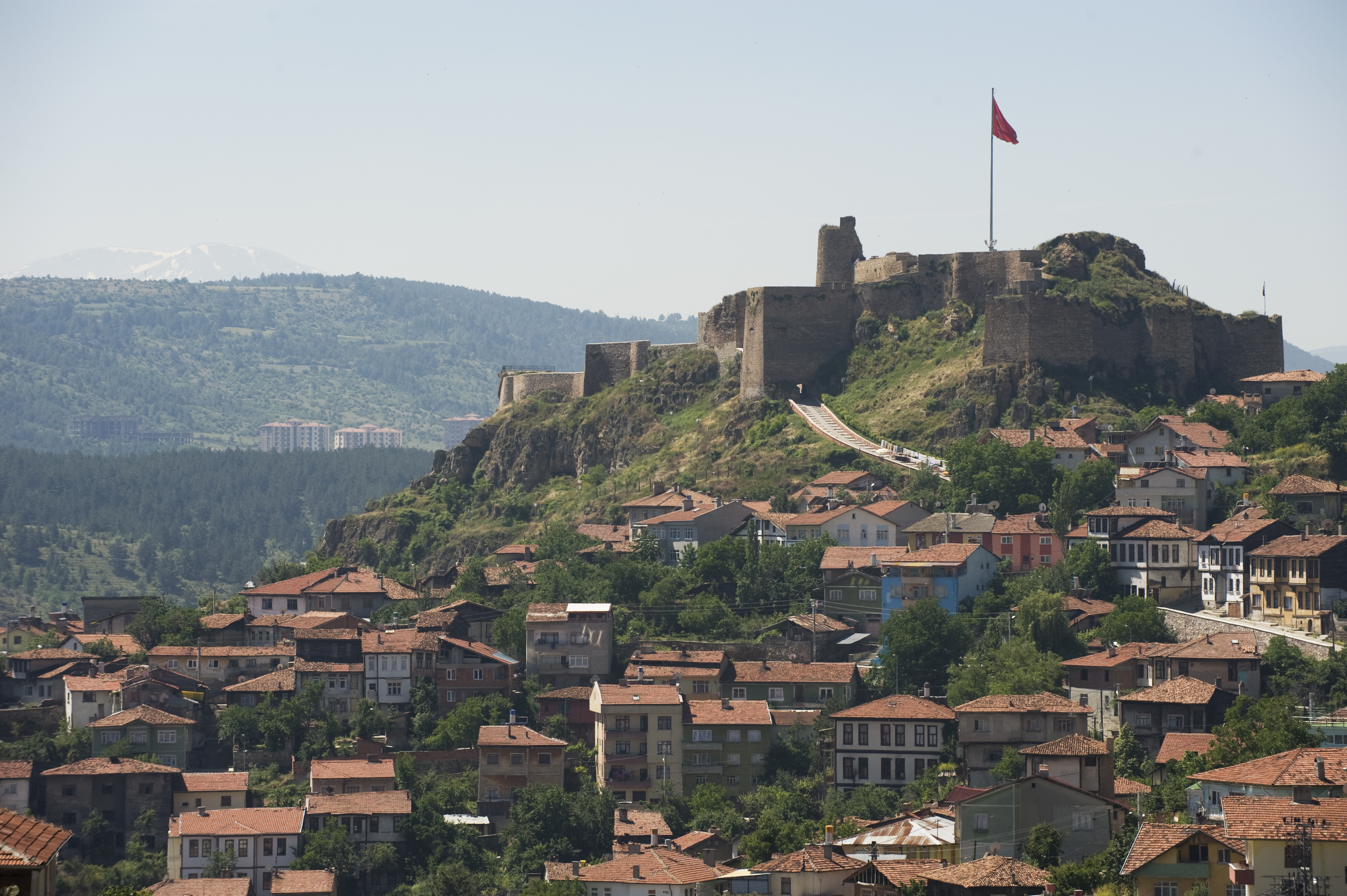
The old town of Kastamonu.

Between the humid Pontic climate and semi-arid conditions further inland, a sub-humid to humid continental climate (Turkish: Karadeniz sâhil ardı iklimi, lit. 'Pre-Pontic climate', Köppen: Dfb, Trewartha: Dc) exists, most notably near Kastamonu. Average temperatures range around 8–11 °C (46–52 °F), with means of 18–21 °C (64–70 °F) during the hottest month and winter means just below the freezing mark. Rainfall is around 500 millimetres (20 in), with a spring storm season.

Climate data for Kastamonu (1991–2020, extremes 1930–2020)
Month	Jan	Feb	Mar	Apr	May	Jun	Jul	Aug	Sep	Oct	Nov	Dec	Year
Mean daily maximum °C (°F)	3.6 (38.5)	6.9 (44.4)	11.5 (52.7)	17.0 (62.6)	21.7 (71.1)	25.3 (77.5)	28.8 (83.8)	29.1 (84.4)	24.6 (76.3)	18.7 (65.7)	11.2 (52.2)	4.8 (40.6)	16.9 (62.4)
Daily mean °C (°F)	−0.6 (30.9)	1.1 (34.0)	4.8 (40.6)	9.5 (49.1)	14.2 (57.6)	17.7 (63.9)	20.5 (68.9)	20.5 (68.9)	16.2 (61.2)	11.2 (52.2)	4.9 (40.8)	0.7 (33.3)	10.1 (50.2)
Mean daily minimum °C (°F)	−3.8 (25.2)	−3.1 (26.4)	−0.4 (31.3)	3.4 (38.1)	7.7 (45.9)	11.0 (51.8)	13.0 (55.4)	13.1 (55.6)	9.5 (49.1)	5.9 (42.6)	0.5 (32.9)	−2.4 (27.7)	4.5 (40.1)
Average precipitation mm (inches)	29.4 (1.16)	28.1 (1.11)	38.5 (1.52)	50.5 (1.99)	77.9 (3.07)	89.6 (3.53)	36.0 (1.42)	38.2 (1.50)	38.7 (1.52)	34.8 (1.37)	27.5 (1.08)	36.1 (1.42)	525.3 (20.68)
Average precipitation days	11.20	10.30	11.87	13.13	15.23	12.70	6.90	6.53	7.37	9.87	8.97	11.37	125.4
Mean monthly sunshine hours	62.0	96.1	127.1	162.0	198.4	222.0	272.8	266.6	192.0	148.8	105.0	55.8	1,908.6
Source: Turkish State Meteorological Service

==== Northeastern high-continental climate ====
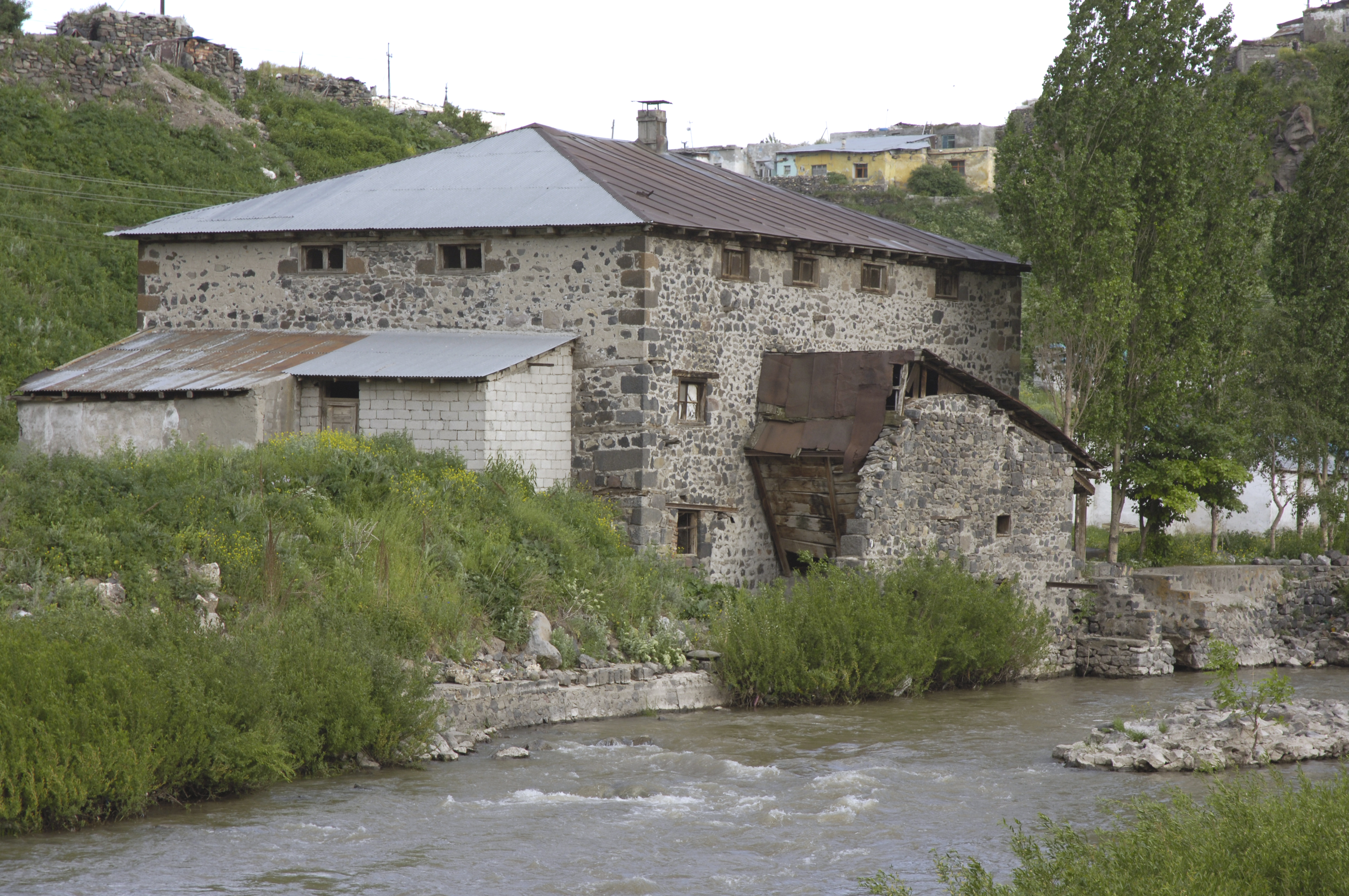
Riparian environment around Kars.

In the far-northeast of the country, often in elevations above 1,500 metres (4,900 ft), the summerly drying trend is no longer observed, and a unique, high-continental climate (Köppen: Dfb/Dfc, Trewartha: Dc/Ec) forms near Kars and Ardahan. Here, average temperatures are generally just above the freezing mark, while summers average around 15 °C (59 °F). Winters are the most severe in the country, with lows routinely below −18 °C (0 °F). Rainfall is generally around 500–700 millimetres (20–28 in) with an early-summer wet season.

Climate data for Ardahan (1991–2020, extremes 1958–2020)
Month	Jan	Feb	Mar	Apr	May	Jun	Jul	Aug	Sep	Oct	Nov	Dec	Year
Mean daily maximum °C (°F)	−4.4 (24.1)	−2.7 (27.1)	3.6 (38.5)	11.1 (52.0)	16.4 (61.5)	20.8 (69.4)	24.3 (75.7)	25.2 (77.4)	21.2 (70.2)	15.2 (59.4)	6.7 (44.1)	−1.5 (29.3)	11.3 (52.3)
Daily mean °C (°F)	−10.3 (13.5)	−9.1 (15.6)	−2.3 (27.9)	4.7 (40.5)	9.6 (49.3)	13.3 (55.9)	16.4 (61.5)	16.7 (62.1)	12.5 (54.5)	7.2 (45.0)	−0.1 (31.8)	−7.3 (18.9)	4.3 (39.7)
Mean daily minimum °C (°F)	−15.5 (4.1)	−14.6 (5.7)	−7.5 (18.5)	−0.8 (30.6)	3.6 (38.5)	6.5 (43.7)	9.4 (48.9)	9.3 (48.7)	4.9 (40.8)	0.7 (33.3)	−5.4 (22.3)	−12.1 (10.2)	−1.8 (28.8)
Average precipitation mm (inches)	24.0 (0.94)	21.7 (0.85)	37.0 (1.46)	54.2 (2.13)	85.2 (3.35)	101.7 (4.00)	77.2 (3.04)	64.8 (2.55)	38.9 (1.53)	41.1 (1.62)	29.9 (1.18)	24.7 (0.97)	600.4 (23.64)
Average precipitation days	7.80	7.97	10.33	14.23	17.97	15.50	12.97	12.00	9.47	10.87	7.93	8.03	135.1
Mean monthly sunshine hours	80.6	104.5	155.0	153.0	195.3	234.0	257.3	251.1	213.0	164.3	111.0	77.5	1,996.6
Source: Turkish State Meteorological Service

==== Orographic rain-belt continental climate ====
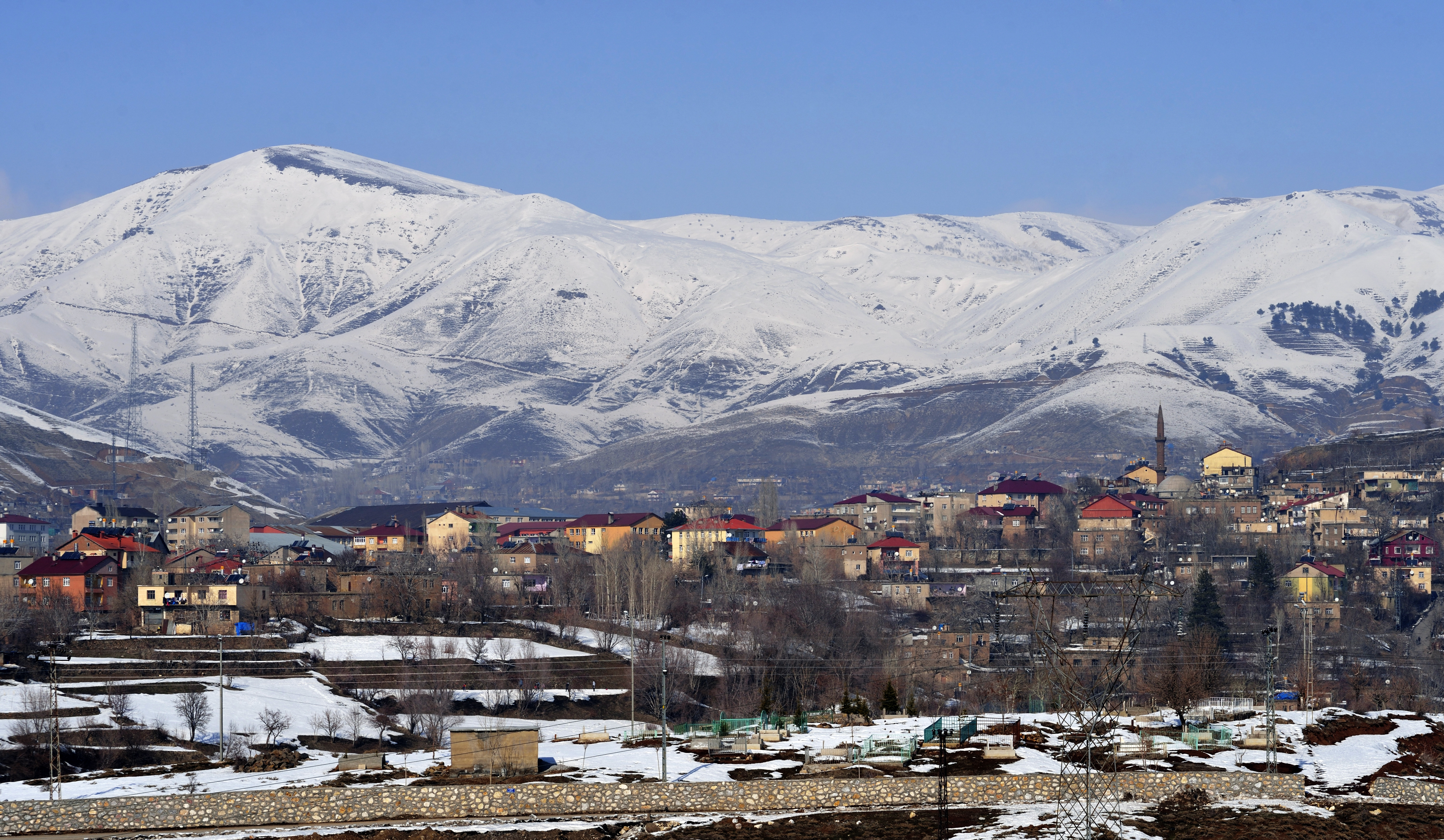
Bitlis during winter.

On the foothills of the Anti-Taurus and Zagros Mountains, south of the Armenian highlands and, in general, near the continental foothills of the southern Alpide belt in Turkey, an orographically-induced rainbelt forms a Mediterranean-influenced continental climate (Köppen: Dsa/Dsb, Trewartha: Dc), high in precipitation. Temperatures average around 8–12 °C (46–54 °F) with winter means around −3 °C (27 °F) and summer temperatures averaging between 21–25 °C (70–77 °F). Precipitation is heaviest in early-spring, with totals above 800 millimetres (31 in). Winters are very snowy. Despite this high precipitation, summer aridity keep the vegetation of the area pre-steppic.

Climate data for Bitlis (1991–2020, extremes 1959–2020)
Month	Jan	Feb	Mar	Apr	May	Jun	Jul	Aug	Sep	Oct	Nov	Dec	Year
Mean daily maximum °C (°F)	−0.9 (30.4)	0.9 (33.6)	5.0 (41.0)	11.7 (53.1)	17.5 (63.5)	24.0 (75.2)	28.9 (84.0)	29.3 (84.7)	24.8 (76.6)	16.5 (61.7)	7.9 (46.2)	2.0 (35.6)	14.0 (57.2)
Daily mean °C (°F)	−4.7 (23.5)	−3.4 (25.9)	0.9 (33.6)	6.8 (44.2)	12.3 (54.1)	18.1 (64.6)	22.6 (72.7)	22.8 (73.0)	18.3 (64.9)	11.2 (52.2)	4.1 (39.4)	−1.6 (29.1)	9.0 (48.2)
Mean daily minimum °C (°F)	−8.5 (16.7)	−7.5 (18.5)	−2.8 (27.0)	2.5 (36.5)	7.2 (45.0)	11.4 (52.5)	15.6 (60.1)	15.9 (60.6)	11.6 (52.9)	6.3 (43.3)	0.4 (32.7)	−5.0 (23.0)	3.9 (39.0)
Average precipitation mm (inches)	161.0 (6.34)	114.3 (4.50)	170.0 (6.69)	136.6 (5.38)	105.7 (4.16)	14.6 (0.57)	11.1 (0.44)	6.1 (0.24)	27.9 (1.10)	89.0 (3.50)	86.8 (3.42)	123.5 (4.86)	1,046.6 (41.20)
Average precipitation days	13.55	11.55	13.73	13.09	14.00	5.09	2.45	1.09	2.55	8.82	9.36	12.45	107.7
Mean monthly sunshine hours	74.4	96.1	158.1	177.0	229.4	279.0	303.8	300.7	276.0	167.4	87.0	62.0	2,210.9
Source: Turkish State Meteorological Service

==== Semi-arid continental climate ====
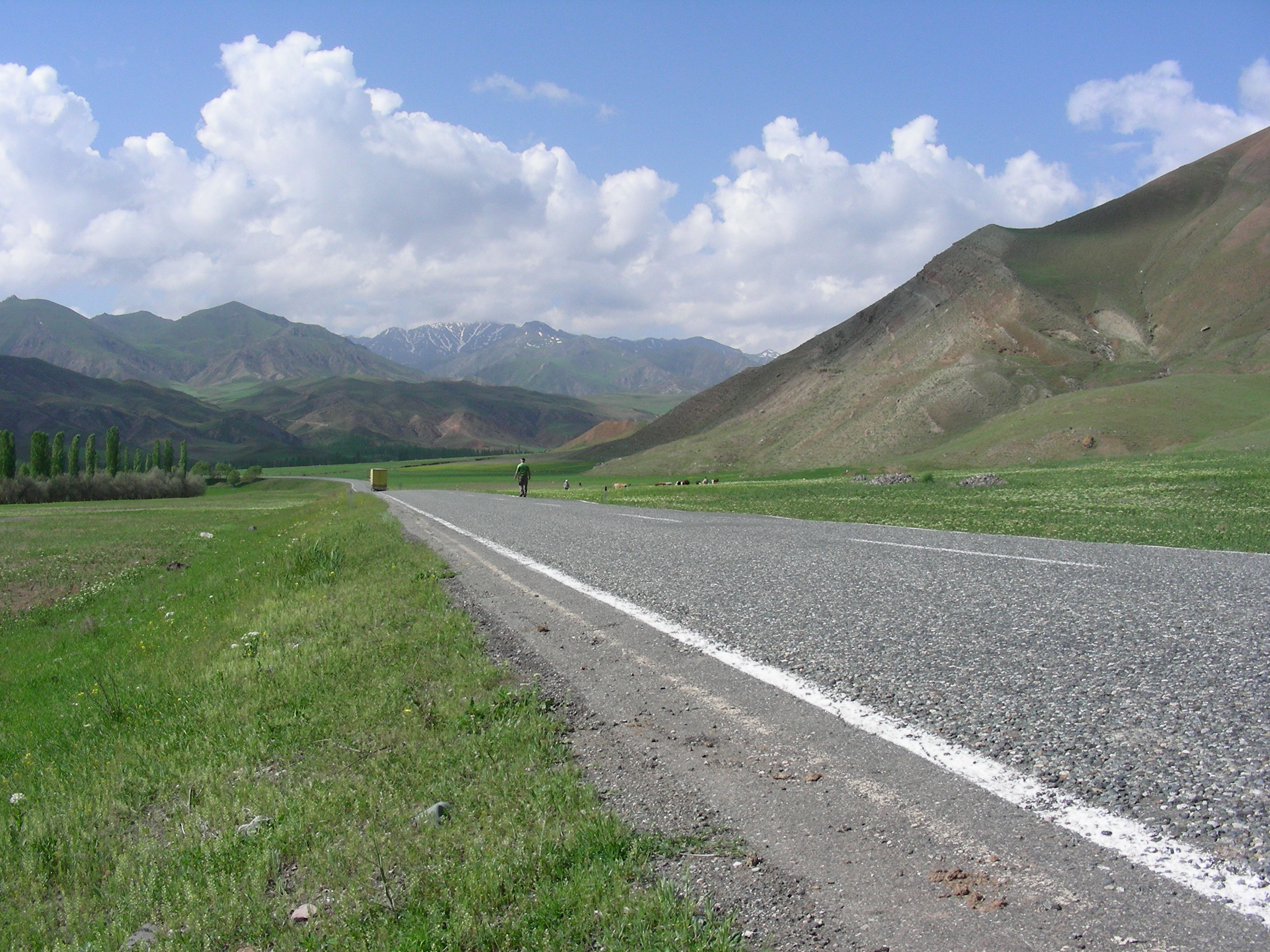
Iğdır, in which a pocket of semi-arid climate exists outside of the climate's typical range.

In drier areas of Central and Eastern Anatolia, a semi-arid, occasionally sub-humid climate (Köppen: BSk/Dsa, Trewartha: BS/Dc) takes hold, due to extensive rain-shadowing from all sides. Here, summer means range around 22–25 °C (72–77 °F), while winter means are around freezing, averaging out to around 10–13 °C (50–55 °F). Precipitation is scarce at around 300–400 millimetres (12–16 in), and heaviest in late-spring.

Climate data for Konya (1991–2020, extremes 1929–2020)
Month	Jan	Feb	Mar	Apr	May	Jun	Jul	Aug	Sep	Oct	Nov	Dec	Year
Mean daily maximum °C (°F)	4.6 (40.3)	6.9 (44.4)	12.5 (54.5)	17.6 (63.7)	22.8 (73.0)	27.4 (81.3)	31.0 (87.8)	30.9 (87.6)	26.7 (80.1)	20.4 (68.7)	12.7 (54.9)	6.3 (43.3)	18.3 (64.9)
Daily mean °C (°F)	−0.3 (31.5)	1.3 (34.3)	6.0 (42.8)	10.9 (51.6)	15.9 (60.6)	20.5 (68.9)	24.1 (75.4)	24.0 (75.2)	19.4 (66.9)	13.4 (56.1)	6.2 (43.2)	1.5 (34.7)	11.9 (53.4)
Mean daily minimum °C (°F)	−3.9 (25.0)	−3.3 (26.1)	0.2 (32.4)	4.4 (39.9)	9.0 (48.2)	13.6 (56.5)	17.1 (62.8)	17.2 (63.0)	12.3 (54.1)	7.0 (44.6)	0.8 (33.4)	−2.2 (28.0)	6.0 (42.8)
Average precipitation mm (inches)	35.9 (1.41)	23.1 (0.91)	27.4 (1.08)	34.2 (1.35)	38.2 (1.50)	27.8 (1.09)	6.5 (0.26)	6.5 (0.26)	15.9 (0.63)	29.7 (1.17)	34.5 (1.36)	45.6 (1.80)	325.3 (12.81)
Average precipitation days	10.53	8.97	9.80	10.83	12.47	8.10	3.00	2.63	4.40	7.27	7.13	10.10	95.2
Mean monthly sunshine hours	105.4	138.4	195.3	216.0	269.7	309.0	344.1	334.8	291.0	235.6	159.0	102.3	2,700.6
Source: Turkish State Meteorological Service

== Climate change ==
There were two significant periods of climate change in the Bronze Age.

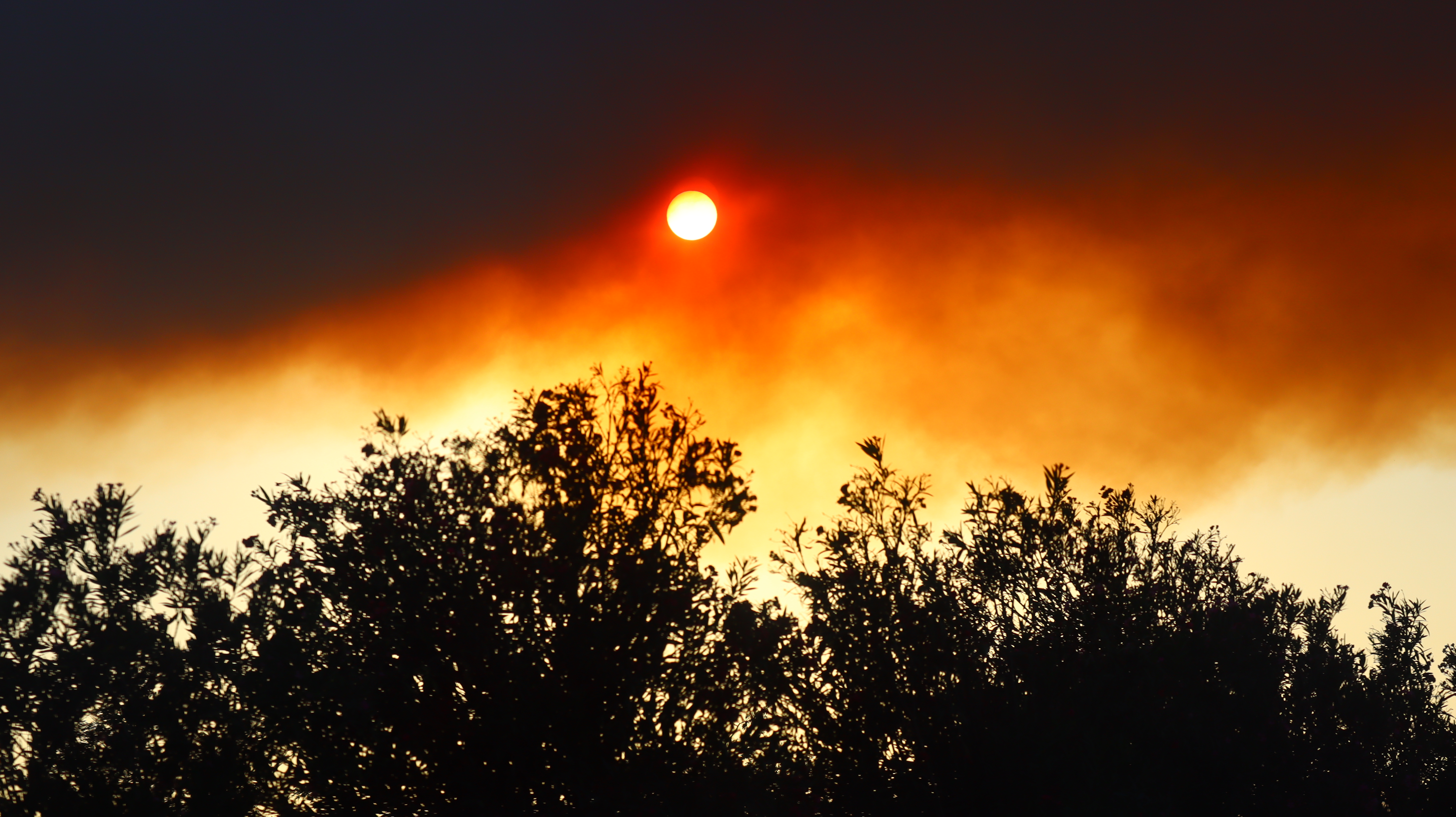
Smoke from a wildfire in 2025: heatwaves are more frequent and longer

Heatwaves and droughts in Turkey are the main hazards due to its climate getting hotter. The temperature has risen in the 21st century, exceeding 50 °C (122 °F) in 2025, and there is more extreme weather. Due to differing geography effects vary across the country. Water supply to some cities is threatened. Turkey will host the 2026 United Nations Climate Change Conference and its president Murat Kurum says that climate finance is the most important issue.

Turkey's annual greenhouse gas emissions are over 1% of the global total, and energy policy includes subsidizing both fossil gas and coal. Per person emissions since the late-2010s have varied around six and a half tonnes a year, which is about the global average. However historical emissions are less than 1% of the global total.

The Directorate of Climate Change co-ordinates adaptation to climate change, which has been planned for water resources by river basin, and for agriculture. Certificate caps in the emission trading system are unclear as of 2026. Housing is not energy efficient, the pathway to the 2053 net zero target is unclear, and there is no plan for coal phase-out.

== See also ==
- Geography of Turkey
- Environmental issues in Turkey
