= Pseudomaquis =

Thicket of broadleaf shrubs

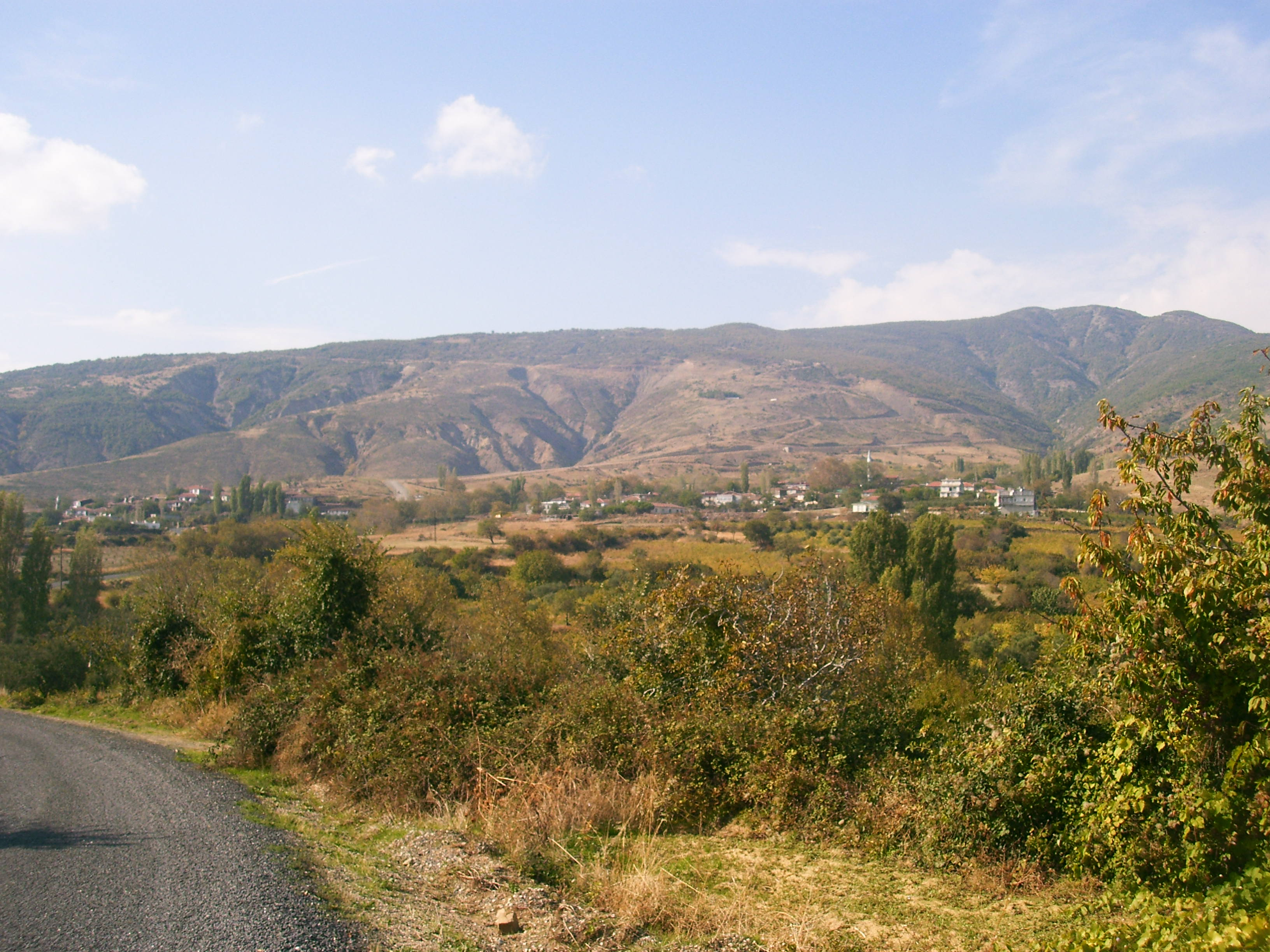
Isolated stands of pseudo-maquis, near Tekirdağ. Note the distinctive fall foliage.

Pseudomaquis, sometimes qualified as Submediterranean pseudomaquis, are thickets of broadleaf shrubs and small trees, forming the transition vegetation between Mediterranean forests or shrublands and temperate forests. Consisting of both deciduous and evergreen plants, these thickets are found at higher altitudes near typical Mediterranean climates in Spain, Italy and southern France, in warmer, sub-Mediterranean regions of the Balkans, and in humid temperate regions affected by deforestation, such as northern Turkey and central France.
