= Bosporus tunnel =

Bosporus tunnel may refer to any of several tunnels under the Bosporus, connecting the European and Asian sides of Istanbul, specifically:

- The Bosporus Water Tunnel, an aqueduct
- The Marmaray Tunnel, a railway tunnel
- The Eurasia Tunnel, a road tunnel
