= Drought in Turkey =

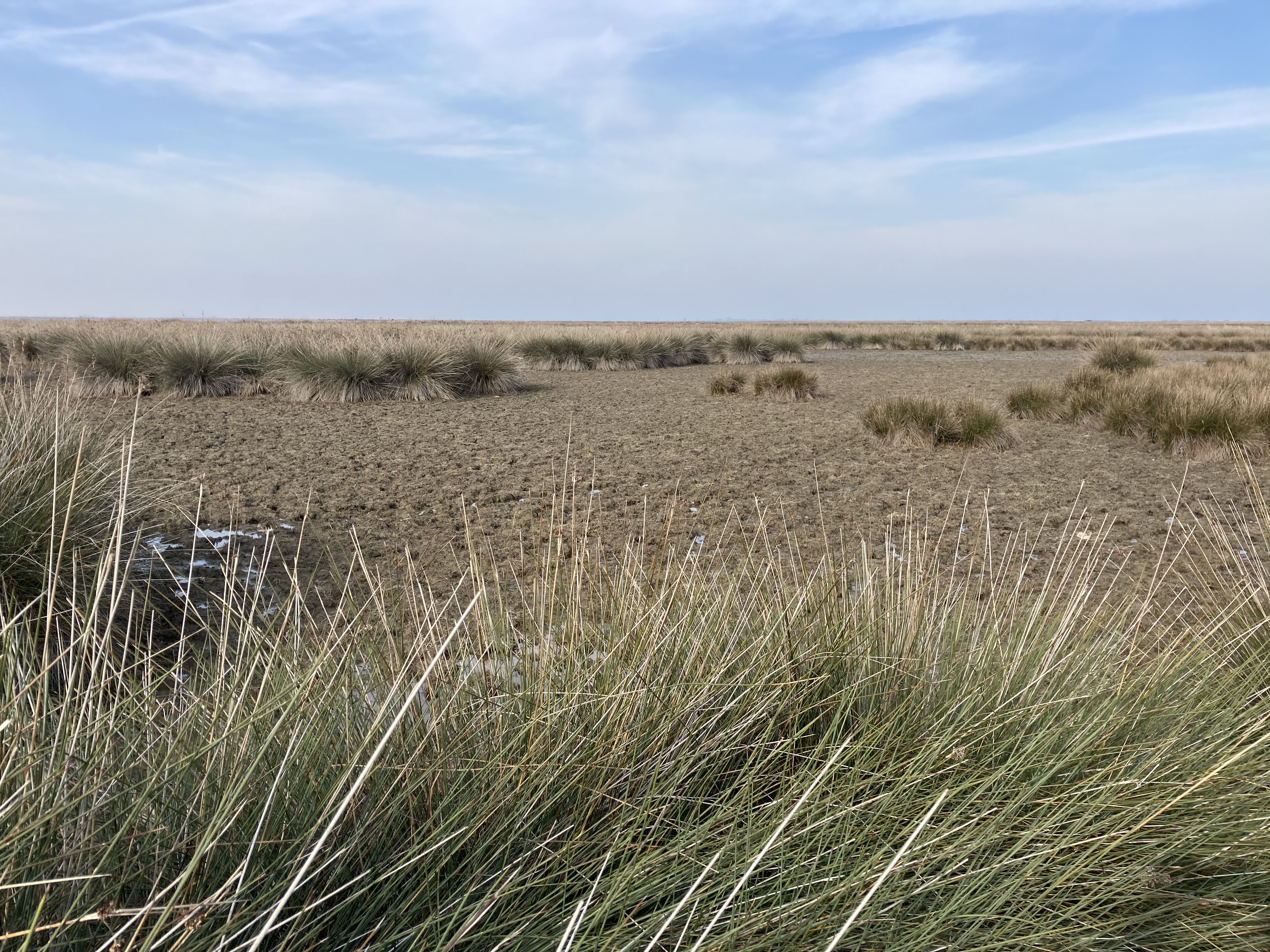
Kızılırmak Delta January 2021

Drought is common in Türkiye, especially in the south and center of the country, with 2025 being one of the driest in the history of the republic. Droughts are forecast to occur more frequently due to climate change. Most water loss is due to poor irrigation. In 2022 the World Bank said that "without reform, a 10% fall in water supply in Türkiye could reduce GDP by 6%". Some lakes are drying out due to dams diverting water for agriculture.

== Major droughts ==
=== 21st century ===
==== 2025 ====
In 2025 the worst drought in over 50 years occurred. In comparison to the last three decades, rainfall dropped by about 27%, while in some areas in the country, there was 71% less rain than in 2024. The rain shortage caused many reservoirs in major cities like Ankara, Istanbul and İzmir, along with areas like Tekirdağ, the Konya Plain, and southeastern Anatolia, to drop to levels of less than 10%.

The water crisis went beyond an urban water shortage, and had an effect on agriculture, irrigation systems and energy production. All are under significant stress, while at the same time, ecosystems are breaking up, and wetlands and lakes are drying up, leaving animals and vegetation at risk.

Reports show there has been a decline in rainfall of 27% in Turkey in comparison to the last 30 years' average. This is connected to global climate change, and a rise in temperature that increases water evaporation and demand for water. As water reservoirs in northwestern provinces like Tekirdağ are depleted, causing water shortage, there is a growing competition as water curbs and rationing are imposed.

Istanbul, the largest city in Türkiye, is suffering from an ongoing water shortage. As of September 2025, its reservoir water stands on just 30% of capacity, when in April it was at 82%. The sharp decline in water level was caused by lack of rainfall and the extreme summer heat. The Naip Dam in Tekirdağ, northwestern Türkiye, was emptied by August 2025 due to a 95% decline in rainfall. Local authorities took emergency steps that included digging new wells and diverting irrigation water to domestic use, thus meeting water demand. In the Konya Basin, the 21st century increase in production of water-intensive crops like sugar beet, corn, and alfalfa is part of the reason for the groundwater level dropping by more than a metre a year. By September many of the province's dams had dropped to critical levels.

The drought had a grave effect on agriculture, mainly in central and southern Türkiye. Crop yield has been reduced and 75% of the country's lakes have disappeared in the past 60 years, increasing environmental damage. The dried up areas are in danger of becoming deserts. According to experts, if this situation continues, Turkey will face reduced harvests and nature damage in the near future. Without significant reforms and climate adaptation strategies, Turkey will become a water scarce country by 2050. Central Anatolia, Turkey's main agricultural area, is extremely vulnerable to desertification.

The government's response to the water crisis includes emergency measures of water rationing, especially during periods in which water pipelines are repaired. In March the government launched a National Water Efficiency Initiative. Its purpose is to save water through education and new tariffs. Heavy users will be charged more than conservative users, so the population will avoid non-essential uses, like watering gardens and washing cars. In September 2025, Turkey with World Bank support launched a $600 million project to manage floods and droughts. It will build new facilities, use nature-based solutions, improve monitoring, and add early warning systems.

==== 2020–2021 ====
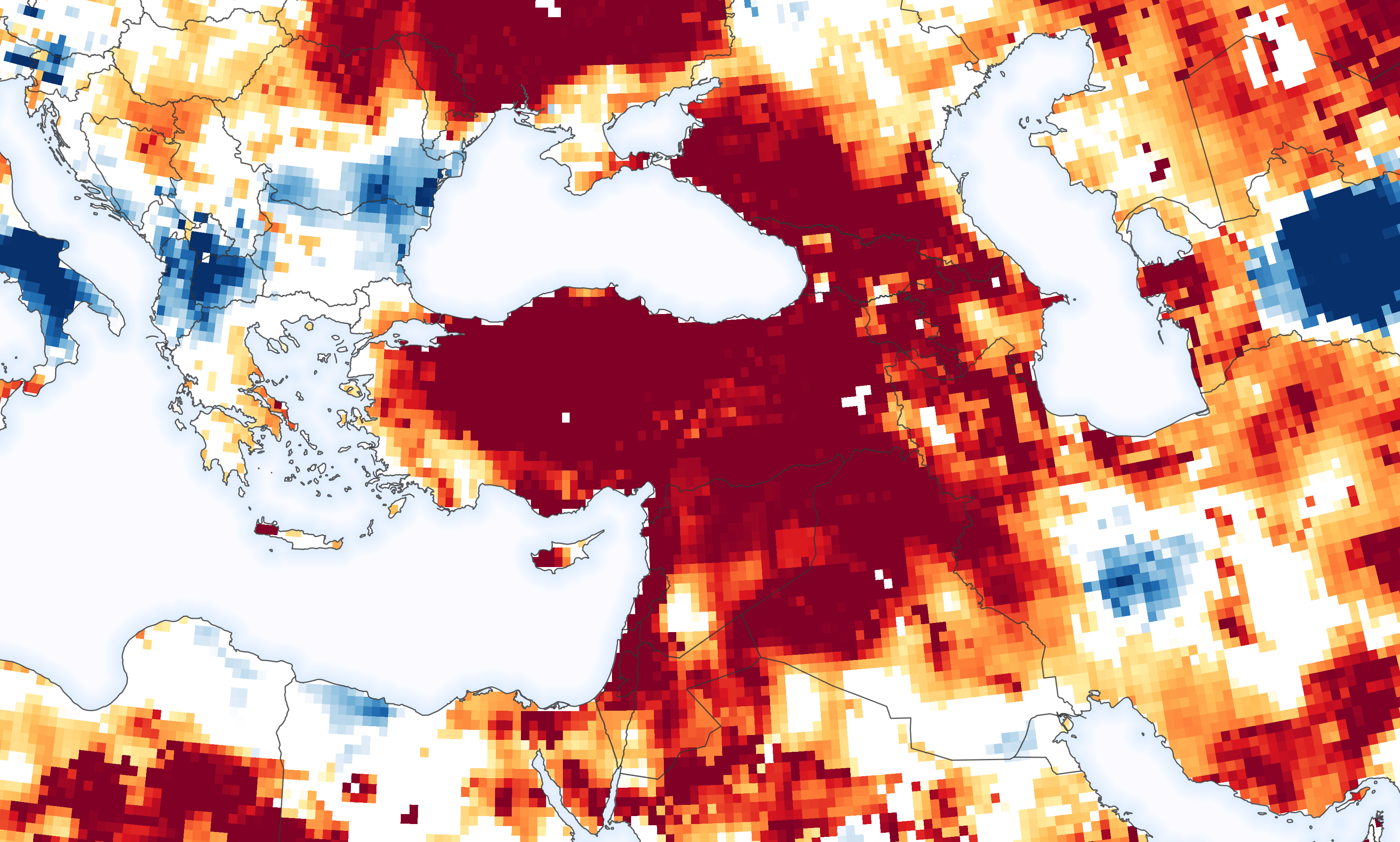
Moisture in the root zone — the top meter of soil — on 11 January 2021. Dark red denotes less than 2% moisture.

Precipitation was below average from mid-2019, and particularly the second half of 2020, and the drought mainly impacted agriculture in Turkey, because big city reservoirs received rain before they ran out.

==== 2013–2014 ====
The 2012 Eastern and Central Anatolia drought combined with the summer drought of the Mediterranean Climate, was experienced as a moderate and severe drought in most of the country in 2013. The total amount of precipitation between 1 October 2013 and 17 January 2014 was about half of the same period in the previous year and 37% below the long-term average.

==== 2007–2008 ====
Between December 2006 and December 2008 there was significantly less winter and autumn precipitation. Hydrological, agricultural and socioeconomic droughts developed due to the meteorological drought. Loss of agricultural products, insufficiency of above ground and underground water, insufficiency and cuts in drinking water in big cities such as Ankara and Istanbul were observed. The drought mostly affected the Aegean, Marmara, Mediterranean and Central Anatolia regions. Drinking water was supplied from the Kızılırmak River to Ankara and from Melen Stream to Istanbul.

=== 20th century ===
There were droughts in 1907–1908, 1928, and often since the 1970s, including 1999.

=== Earlier ===
A severe drought coincided with the collapse of the Hittite Empire around 1198–1196 BC. There were droughts in the mid to late 1300s, 1804 and 1876.

== Climate ==
=== Weather patterns ===
Most of the climate of Turkey in the interior is a semi-arid climate and on the south and west coasts a Mediterranean climate which are characterized by summer drought. Turkey's climate is affected by the North Atlantic oscillation (NAO), the Mediterranean Circulation Index, and the Southern Oscillation Index.

=== Climate change ===
Due to climate change, extreme droughts and water scarcity are predicted to increase, for example in Ankara Province. A 2025 UN report concluded that 88% of Turkey's land area faces desertification by the year 2030. The report says that without taking drastic measures Turkey will face major environmental damage, and water and food shortages.

== Geography ==
Parts of the country are arid or becoming arid. Between 1931 and 2010 extreme drought occurred in 3% of the country, severe drought in 4% and moderate drought in 7%. The lowest precipitation in Turkey is around Lake Tuz at around 35 cm per year.

== Desertification and wildfire risk ==
More than 60% (51.5 mil. ha) of environmentally sensitive areas are fragile and critical. Shrinking lakes may be due to reduced precipitation being part of climate change, and increased water use by agriculture. Droughts make wildfires more likely.

== Agriculture ==
“Water year rainfall” is the total precipitation between Oct 1 and Sept 30 as it includes the agricultural irrigation period.

Grain in Konya Province is affectedAlmost three-quarters of the water supply is used for irrigation and most water loss is due to poor irrigation, and more widespread use of drip irrigation has been suggested. Drought resistant crops are being studied and a drought early warning system is expected to be ready by 2027.

== Water resources ==
There are about 1500 cubic meters per person per year. Based to the Falkenmark Index, Turkey is 'water stressed' since it has 1,000-1,500 m^{3} of water potential per person per year. Precipitation can be measured by satellite. Turkey suffers from water loss through its distribution pipeline networks, resulting in an increase of water shortage. Turkey has no centralized water management system; a large number of agencies manage it separately. This makes it hard for the government to establish water management planning. Turkey's growing population, especially in major cities like Istanbul, is weighing heavily on the country's water resources.In correlation so are the water demands for the agricultural and industrial sectors.

== Other uses of water ==
Hydroelectricity in Turkey is reduced by climate change. According to the Water Policy Association half of water intended for taps is lost to leaks. According to TEMA 4 million tons a day are consumed for coal mining.The 2023 drought caused power cuts and increased electricity and gas prices.

Officially sanctioned methods to combat drought include better protecting river basins, building underground dams,rainwater harvesting, use of grey waterand praying for rain.
