= Turkish State Meteorological Service =

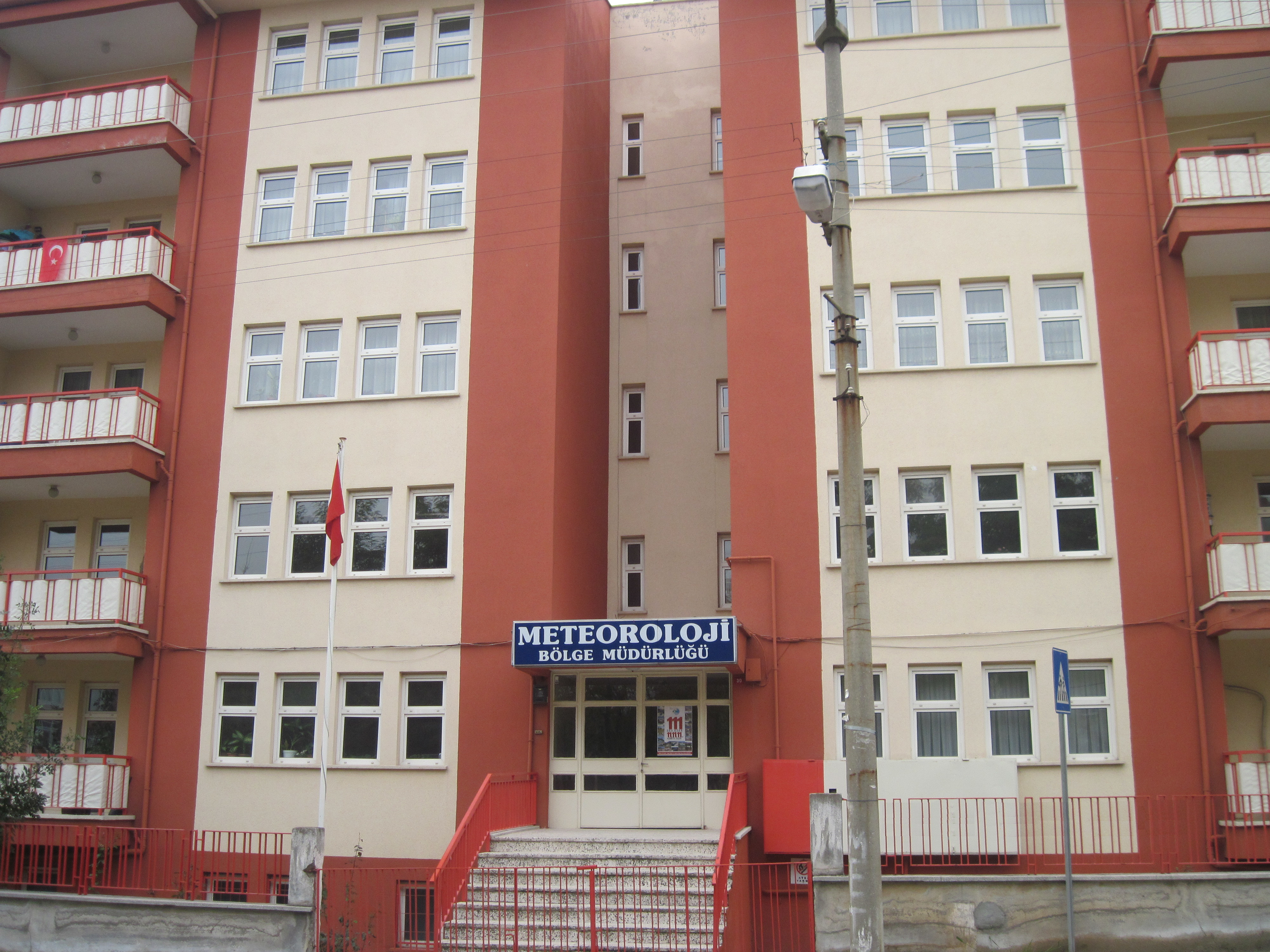
- Turkish State Meteorological Service office building in Balıkesir
- Established: 10 February 1937 (89 years ago)
- Types: meteorological service organization, government agency
- Headquarters: Ankara
- Country: Turkey
- Website: mgm.gov.tr

Turkish State Meteorological Service (Turkish: Meteoroloji Genel Müdürlüğü or MGM) is the Turkish government bureau commissioned with producing the meteorological and climatic data pertaining to Turkey. It is responsible to the Ministry of Environment, Urbanisation and Climate Change.

== History ==
Efforts to conduct meteorological services in Turkey through a single and organized channel were addressed within the year 1936. The commission formed for the establishment of the General Directorate of State Meteorological Affairs submitted a legislative proposal to the Council of Ministers on February 11, 1936. The justifications for the establishment of the General Directorate of State Meteorological Affairs were discussed and accepted by the Council of Ministers under the chairmanship of Prime Minister İsmet İnönü and were submitted to the Grand National Assembly of Turkey on November 30, 1936, with letter number 6/3727 from the Prime Ministry Directorate of Resolutions.

The following justifications were included in the bill regarding the creation of the General Directorate of State Meteorological Affairs: "Prior to the establishment of the Republic of Turkey, there was no organization in the country working with various station networks dealing with atmospheric phenomena. Within the last ten years, the need for weather and climate information in our country has made itself felt so strongly that, first in 1925, the Ministries of Agriculture and National Defense began by establishing climate and observation organizations. The reason why each of the technical and administrative units of the Republic of Turkey feels a strong need for weather and climate information stems from the fact that the Republic is advancing with the clearest steps in all the technical works the country requires, and its belief in the necessity of relying on the firmest technical foundations while taking these steps. The execution of all state affairs in contemporary and modern forms, and the ability of the state to obtain the highest efficiency from the money and labor it spends, depends on knowing the relationship of the work to the weather and climate according to its content, and on taking into account the effects and results of the weather on the work. For this reason, the Republic of Turkey's need for a weather observation organization has become an explicit necessity. Since the personnel and materials of the observation stations established by various ministries until now are very deficient for the reasons mentioned above, and since their training and the meeting of their needs depend on money and possibilities, it has been deemed appropriate to prepare a three-year program for the newly created institution to become fully operational."

The Agriculture Commission of the Grand National Assembly of Turkey submitted its report to the Presidency of the TBMM with decision number 8 on December 28, 1936; the National Defense Commission with decision number 15 on January 5, 1937; and the Budget Commission with decision number 52 on January 8, 1937. The Establishment Law of the General Directorate of State Meteorological Affairs, consisting of 27 articles and 10 provisional articles, was accepted on February 10, 1937, as Law No. 3127. After Law No. 3127 was accepted, the TBMM Presidency sent it to the Office of the President for approval on February 11, 1937, with memorandum number 1/649/2077. The great leader Gazi Mustafa Kemal Atatürk signed the Establishment Law of the General Directorate of State Meteorological Affairs on February 19, 1937, and sent it to the Directorate of Publications to be published.

World War II broke out two and a half years after the establishment of the General Directorate of Meteorology. This caused a large portion of Turkey's economic and human resources to be allocated to defense. During the war, the General Directorate of Meteorology came under the command of the Armed Forces and carried out its work accordingly. World War II was also a great experience for the General Directorate of State Meteorological Affairs, which was still a fairly new organization. After the end of World War II, a rapid development occurred in meteorological services as well. As a result of increased international cooperation, the General Directorate of Meteorology became a member of the World Meteorological Organization on May 31, 1949.

The General Directorate of Meteorology, which served under the Prime Ministry, was attached to the Ministry of Agriculture on May 15, 1957, by Law No. 6967. On January 5, 1978, it was re-attached to the Prime Ministry. The establishment law (No. 3127) of the General Directorate of State Meteorological Affairs, which is the only organization responsible for carrying out meteorological services in Turkey today, was changed in 1986 by Law No. 3254; its establishment, duties, powers, and responsibilities were redefined. The General Directorate of State Meteorological Affairs, which was attached to the Ministry of Environment by a Statutory Decree issued in 1991, was once again made an organization attached to the Prime Ministry as of July 1992 by Law No. 3812 and a Presidential memorandum dated February 28, 1992. The products of the meteorological services provided by the General Directorate of State Meteorological Affairs were priced with the Revolving Fund Management Regulation published in the Official Gazette on November 3, 1994. Its name was changed to the Turkish State Meteorological Service by Statutory Decree No. 657, published in the Official Gazette dated November 02, 2011, and numbered 28103.
