= Bosporus Water Tunnel =

Undersea aqueduct in Istanbul, Turkey

Bosphorus Water Tunnel Boğaziçi Su Tüneli
- Interactive map of Bosphorus Water Tunnel; Boğaziçi Su Tüneli

Overview
- Location: Ortaçeşme (Beykoz) to Derbent (Sarıyer) under the Bosphorus strait in Istanbul, Turkey
- Coordinates: 41.12760°N 29.08098°E
- Waterway: Melen System (Melen Creek and tunnels)

Operation
- Work began: 2007
- Opened: 19 May 2012

Technical
- Length: 5,551 m (18,212 ft)

The Bosphorus Water Tunnel (Turkish: Boğaziçi Su Tüneli) or Bosporus aqueduct is an undersea aqueduct in Istanbul, Turkey, crossing the Bosphorus strait. It was constructed in 2012 to transfer water from the Melen Creek in Düzce Province to the European side of Istanbul.

== Need for the aqueduct ==
With a population of about 15 million, Istanbul is trying to secure its citizens' access to drinking water. Most clean water in Turkey (and, consequently, Istanbul) is located on the Asian borders of the country. Therefore, it is difficult to bring water to Istanbul's Asian side with hundreds of kilometres of pipelines, and another challenge to bring water to the European side of Istanbul with a tunnel dug 85 metres under the sea bed (145 metres under the sea surface) atop an active fault.

== Commissioning and finance ==
The tunnel was commissioned by the Ministry of Forest and Water Management and constructed by an international consortium of Russian and Turkish companies (Mosmetrostroy, ALKE and STFA). The Melen Water Supply Project was funded mainly by JBIC (Japanese Bank for International Cooperation) and partly by DSI (State Hydraulic Works).

== Construction ==
There were two phases to the project: the underwater-tunnel phase and the land-tunnel phase. The underwater phase (3145 meters) was done by the TBM (tunnel boring machine) method, and the land part (2406 meters) by blasting. The TBM-drilling part of the project was completed in May 2009 and a ceremony was held, with the attendance of minister Prof. Dr. Veysel Eroğlu, bureaucrats, Russian diplomats and Kadir Topbaş, the mayor of Istanbul. The TBM is specially designed and constructed for this project by the German firm Herrenknecht, and is six metres in diameter. The average advancing speed of the TBM during the project was 8 m (26 ft) per day, with a maximum speed of 20.4 metres per day. After the tunneling works are finished, the tunnel is being lined by prefabricated concrete segments, after which come nine-metre-long steel pipes with an inside diameter of four metres.

== Infrastructure ==
The tunnel is 136 m (446 ft) under the sea level, resisting a pressure of 14 bar (200 psi). It is a steel tube of 4 m (13 ft) in diameter, which is inside a hard-rock type tunnel of 6 m (20 ft) in diameter, bored with high-technology machinery. Situated between Ortaçeşme (Beykoz) and Derbent (Sarıyer) under the Bosphorus, the 5,551 m (3.449 mi) long waterway tunnel has a water flow rate of 32.5 m^{3}/s (1,150 cu ft/s).

Being the first stage of the Melen System that cost 2 billion TL, the waterway tunnel was constructed in 1,756 days and completed on 19 May 2012 without any accident. It will transfer a daily rate of 2.8 million m^{3} of water, which is two and half times higher than Istanbul's current water consumption. The Melen System will bring the water of the Melen Creek in Düzce Province from a distance of 185 km (115 mi), and will ensure the needed water supply for Greater Istanbul until the 2060s.

It is the first tunnel connecting two continents.

There is a large railway project which will connect both sides of Istanbul as well, but it will be through submerged tubes placed on the sea bed and not by tunnelling.

== See also ==
- Water supply and sanitation in Istanbul
