= Water supply and sanitation in Turkey =

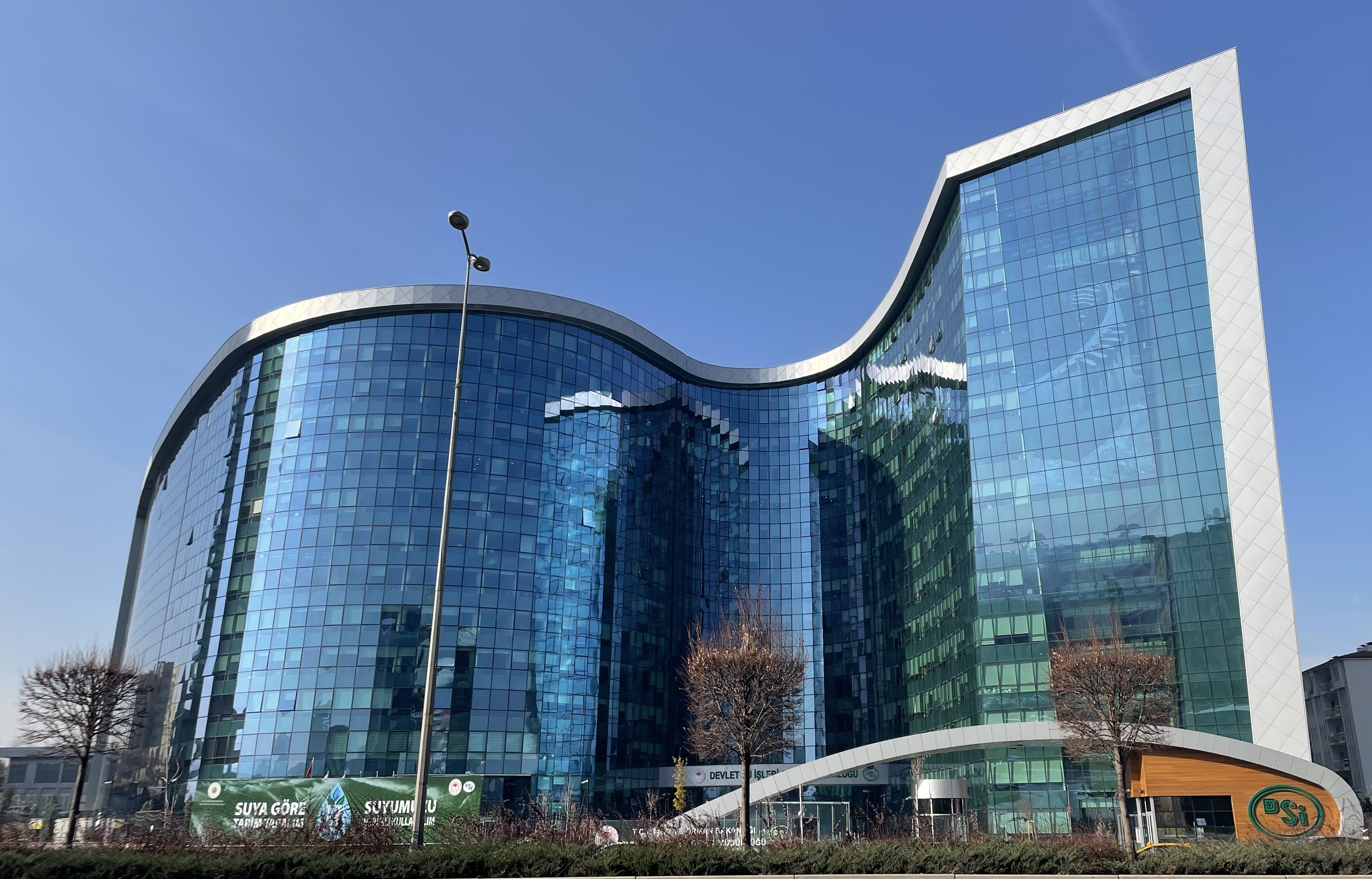
- State Hydraulic Works Headquarters

Data
- Access to an improved water source: 99%
- Access to improved sanitation: 98%

Tap water is drinkable in some parts of Turkey. Water supply in the country is stressed and may become scarce by the 2030s, with most of the country vulnerable to desertification.

Both sit and squat toilets usually have integrated or add-on bidets, and almost all mosques have public toilets. However sewage is not always properly treated before being discharged, and this is one of the causes of pollution of the seas.

Water supply and sanitation in Turkey is characterized by achievements and challenges. Over the past decades access to drinking water has become almost universal and access to adequate sanitation has also increased substantially. Autonomous utilities have been created in the 16 metropolitan cities of Turkey and cost recovery has been increased, thus providing the basis for the sustainability of service provision. Intermittent supply, which was common in many cities, has become less frequent.

Turkey has between 2,500 and 1,350 cubic metres of water available per person per year, but this varies a lot by region, with some areas short such as water supply and sanitation in Istanbul, partly due to urbanisation and climate change in Turkey. Over three-quarters of the freshwater used is by agriculture, and charging for it has been suggested.

Remaining challenges include the need to further increase wastewater treatment, to reduce the high level of non-revenue water hovering around 50% and to expand access to adequate sanitation in rural areas. Turkey is aiming for good water status under the EU Water Framework Directive by 2027.

There is a water management plan to 2028. Institutionally the sector is fragmented. Policy, regulatory and planning functions are dispersed between five Ministries, the State Hydraulic Works (DSI) and the State Planning Organization under the Prime Minister's Office. Service provision is the responsibility of about 2,400 municipalities and 16 utilities in the largest cities. External cooperation has played and continues to play a major role for water and sanitation in Turkey. Germany, France, the European Union and the World Bank are the major external partners.

== Access ==
As of 2026, in Turkey, access to water was universal. Regarding sanitation, 100% of the population have access to "improved" sanitation according to UN data.

Access to water supply and sanitation in Turkey is high. Based on household surveys and census results, the Joint Monitoring Programme for Water Supply and Sanitation estimates that 100% of the Turkish urban population had access to an improved water source in 2007. In rural areas, where less than a third of the population lives, 96% had access. In urban areas 97% had access to improved sanitation facilities, compared to 75% in rural areas. In urban areas, 95% were connected to sewers, the remaining 5% being served by septic tanks.

== Wastewater treatment ==
There are almost 1327 wastewater treatment plants. 5% of treated wastewater is reused and there is a 30% target for 2030. Untreated wastewater is a cause of marine mucilage in the Marmara Sea.

== Water resources and water use ==
As rainfall, evaporation and runoff varies a lot from year to year it is hard to predict river flow. Municipal water use accounts for about 11% of total water use in Turkey, compared to 77% used by agriculture and 12% by industry. Total water withdrawals for all uses accounted for only 17% of total available water resources in an average year (average 1977–2001). Municipal water use thus accounted for only about 3% of available water resources. However, water availability is highly seasonal and is not equally distributed throughout the country. Local and regional water shortages occur despite ample average water availability. For example, in 2007 a severe drought hit the entire Mediterranean coast as well as Central Anatolia and threatened the water supply of Istanbul and Ankara.

=== Municipalities ===
River basins of Turkey also showing where they extend into neighbouring countries

In 2024, 7.5 billion m3 of water was abstracted by municipalities, 255 litres per person. Of this amount, 40% was abstracted from dams, 30% from wells, 17% from springs, 10% from rivers, and 4% from lakes. Old city water networks need improvement and more than a third of water is leaked. Too much groundwater has been sucked out so quality has got worse. There are groundwater regulations but they are hard to enforce. In some cities rainwater cannot flow through the surface to aquifers: collecting more rainwater and using treated water for irrigation or cleaning streets has been suggested. There are flows of water embedded in food, mostly wheat, barley and maize. Rainwater collection systems are required on larger new buildings. In some areas tourist water use has been blamed for shortages. Some suggest filling swimming pools with seawater whereas others suggest desalination. Real time pressure management could help preserve old networks.

=== Water budget ===
Water Budget Components of Large River Basins of Turkey (1981–2010)
| | Basin Name | Drainage Area (km^{2}) | Million m^{3} | | | |
| | Basin Name | Drainage Area (km^{2}) | Precipitation | Flow | Actual evapotranspiration | Infiltration |
| 1 | Maritza-Ergene | 14444.1 | 8561.4 | 1858.9 | 6382.7 | 319.8 |
| 2 | Marmara | 23107.1 | 16186.8 | 7537.9 | 8405.5 | 243.4 |
| 3 | Susurluk | 24332.0 | 15645.1 | 4227.2 | 8776.5 | 2641.4 |
| 4 | North Aegean | 9973.6 | 6051.4 | 1500.5 | 3969.0 | 581.8 |
| 5 | Gediz | 17034.0 | 9002.9 | 1536.3 | 6916.7 | 549.9 |
| 6 | Kucuk Menderes | 7059.7 | 4323.4 | 527.1 | 3260.3 | 536.1 |
| 7 | Buyuk Menderes | 26133.2 | 15889.0 | 2993.3 | 10279.4 | 2616.4 |
| 8 | West Mediterranean | 21223.9 | 15705.5 | 6965.1 | 7458.6 | 1281.7 |
| 9 | Antalya | 20330.8 | 15670.5 | 13076.2 | 2255.4 | 338.9 |
| 10 | Burdur | 6306.2 | 3020.3 | 264.4 | 1630.0 | 1125.9 |
| 11 | Akarcay | 7982.6 | 3805.7 | 325.6 | 2290.1 | 1190.0 |
| 12 | Sakarya | 63357.8 | 29352.3 | 5290.3 | 17254.4 | 6807.6 |
| 13 | West Black Sea | 28929.8 | 22017.6 | 9905.1 | 11534.0 | 578.6 |
| 14 | Yesilirmak | 39628.0 | 20170.9 | 6584.6 | 11173.6 | 2412.7 |
| 15 | Kizilirmak | 82197.3 | 37126.8 | 6123.6 | 19956.7 | 11046.6 |
| 16 | Konya Closed | 50037.8 | 19524.8 | 2649.7 | 11294.3 | 5580.7 |
| 17 | West Mediterranean | 21807.0 | 12709.8 | 8250.4 | 3139.4 | 1319.9 |
| 18 | Seyhan | 22241.6 | 12935.4 | 6778.1 | 3960.8 | 2196.5 |
| 19 | Asi | 7912.4 | 6556.9 | 1825.9 | 3743.5 | 987.6 |
| 20 | Ceyhan | 21598.5 | 14025.6 | 7349.4 | 6338.1 | 338.0 |
| 21 | Euphrates-Tigris | 176657.0 | 99900.5 | 55577.3 | 43168.5 | 1154.6 |
| 22 | East Black Sea | 22844.6 | 22844.8 | 16476.3 | 4318.3 | 2050.1 |
| 23 | Coruh | 20248.7 | 14286.0 | 7047.1 | 5858.3 | 1380.6 |
| 24 | Aras | 28114.6 | 13593.2 | 4182.2 | 8370.2 | 1040.8 |
| 25 | Van Closed | 17977.0 | 9164.3 | 2263.2 | 6823.7 | 77.4 |
| | Total | 781479.4 | 448070.8 | 181115.7 | 218558.0 | 48397.0 |

=== Drinking water quality ===
According to the Environmental Performance Index, Turkey‘s water and sanitation quality scores 85.06 out of 100. Access to better water sources and sanitation is now available to 100% of the population, up from 86% in 1990. To improve the quality of its waters, Turkey is implementing European Union (EU) directives. The Water Framework Directive, which is part of the EU Water Quality Sector, is the most important directive in this sector. Turkey set out to reach good water status by 2027 at the latest, depending on the exact explanation. Both ecological and chemical quality requirements are covered under the excellent status. "Water Quality in Turkey". Fanack Water. Fanack.

=== Climate change ===
Climate change in Turkey is putting pressure on water resources.

=== Earthquakes ===
Lack of clean water after earthquakes in Turkey can risk infections.

== Legal and institutional framework ==
=== Policy and regulation ===
The state owns water sources and can lease them but it is alleged that leasing has not been transparent: water regulations are complicated and ambiguous, as many regulations have been applied since the 1926 water law. Turkey is not aligned with the EU Drinking Water Directive.

There is no single water and sanitation law in Turkey, and there is no single institution charged with developing policies for water supply and sanitation or for regulating the sector. A number of laws on the environment, health and local government together form the legal framework of the sector. Local governments play a central role in the sector as service provider, partially mobilizing resources for investment financing from their own revenues and being responsible for the elaboration of location-specific Master Plans, feasibility studies and for the procurement of the necessary works.

At the national level, a number of government entities form the institutional framework of the sector. The State Planning Organization under the Prime Minister's Office is in charge of general investment planning through Five-Year Plans; the Ministry of Interior is in charge of supervising local governments through its General Directorate of Local Authorities; the Ministry of Public Works and Settlement controls the state-owned Bank of the Provinces, a source of financing for water supply and sanitation; the Ministry of Environment and Forestry is in charge of developing water resources as well as environmental monitoring and enforcement; the Ministry of Agriculture through the drinking water unit in the General Directorate for Rural Services (KHGM) is in charge of planning, financing and building rural drinking water supply; and the Ministry of Health is, in charge of monitoring drinking water quality.

=== Service provision ===
The 16 largest cities in Turkey each have legally separate and financially autonomous municipal water and sanitation companies called Su ve Kanalizasyon Idaresi (SKIs). These utilities were created during the 1980s and 1990s, beginning with the establishment of ISKI in Istanbul in 1981. The boards of these companies are typically chaired by the mayor. Smaller cities provide services directly through municipal water and sewer departments. SKIs exist in the following metropolitan cities: Adana, ASKI – Ankara, Antalya, Bursa, ISKI – Istanbul, DISKI – Diyarbakir, Kayseri, Denizli, Eskişehir, Gaziantep, İzmir, Konya, Malatya, Mersin, Samsun, and Sanliurfa.

=== Private sector participation ===
Private sector participation in the provision of water supply and sanitation in Turkey is mostly limited to the operation of water and wastewater treatment plants without direct contact with customers.

=== Bulk water supply ===
The State Hydraulic Works (Turkish: Devlet Su İşleri or DSİ) is an agency under the Ministry of Environment and Forestry responsible for the utilization of country's water resources. Besides water resources assessment and monitoring, hydropower production and bulk water supply for agriculture, DSİ is also responsible by law for the supply of domestic and industrial water to cities with more than 100,000 inhabitants. As of the 2000 census, there were 55 such cities in Turkey. DSİ supplied water to 26 million people in 45 cities.

As of the beginning of 2005, DSİ supplied annually a total of around 2.5 km^{3} domestic water complying with drinking water standards. This figure will reach 5.3 km^{3} with completion of the projects which are under construction, or at the final design and planning stages. Water supply projects developed by DSİ meet one third of the requirements for domestic and industrial water consumption.

=== International basins ===
Water flows into Turkey in the Meriç-Ergene and Asi basins, and out in the Çoruh, Kura-Aras and Fırat-Dicle basins.

== Agriculture ==
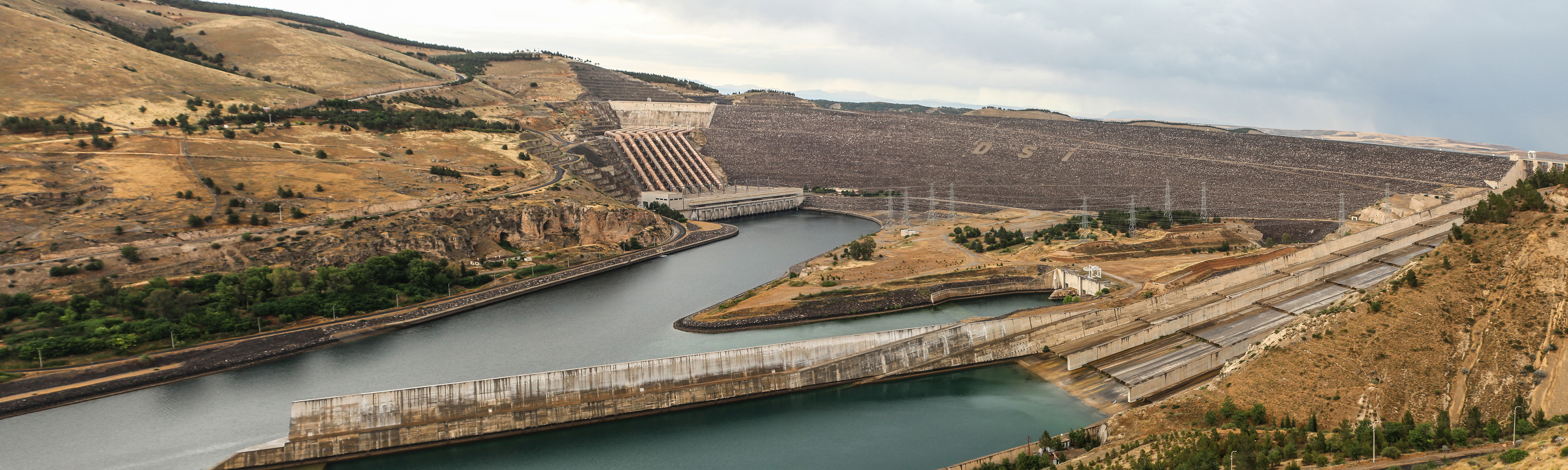
The Atatürk Dam is the largest of the 22 dams in the Southeastern Anatolia Project, which includes the irrigation of 1.82 million hectares of land.

At around 1300 m^{3} freshwater per person per year, Turkey is water-stressed and at risk of water scarcity, mainly due to wasteful irrigation. Water pricing is being considered. Desertification has been modelled and the risk has been mapped, showing that high-risk regions are Karapınar, Aralık, Ceylanpınar and Lake Tuz basins. Solar power is occasionally used to pump water to combat drought, which can reduce planting of crops such as corn and potatoes. The irrigation part of the Eastern Anatolia Project is controversial.

Farmers mostly use surface irrigation, which loses 35% to 60% of water through evaporation, seepage, and leakage. This old-fashioned irrigation may quickly deplete groundwater and run off the farm. Runoff is causing nitrogen pollution in some river basins. This can cause eutrophication which threatens aquatic life and a project is ongoing to map and combat this. As of 2023 73% of Turkey's water supply is used for irrigation, and it has been estimated that this is double what it would be if all farmers used drip irrigation. Farmers are reluctant because of the installation cost of drip installation, and more government support has been suggested. Shrinking lakes have been blamed both on reduced precipitation due to climate change and incorrect crops using more water, such as corn and sugar beet. Most irrigation is managed by unions. Charging for water used by agriculture has been suggested. Some farmers complain that drip irrigation is too expensive. Olives need less irrigation than pistachios, almonds and grapes. There is much more scope for water efficiency improvements in agriculture than other sectors.

== Efficiency ==
The level of non-revenue water (physical and commercial water losses) in Turkish cities is much higher than in other OECD countries except for Mexico. For example, in 2006 it was 45% in Kayseri, 51% in Diyarbakir and 69% in Adana. The level of non-revenue water in Istanbul decreased from more than 50% prior to 1994 to 34% in 2000 due to large investments in pipe replacement.

== Financial aspects ==
=== Tariffs and cost recovery ===
Water and sanitation tariffs in Turkish cities are set by local governments. For residential users most cities charge increasing-block tariffs. Commercial users and public institutions are charged a linear tariff that is close to or higher than the highest block of the residential tariff. During the 1990s, a period of high inflation in Turkey, some cities have indexed tariffs to inflation to prevent an erosion of tariffs. Under the indexation system tariffs are automatically increased every three months in line with the increase of the consumer price index. The level of cost recovery of utilities in Turkey is generally high, and some of them post moderate profits. Tariffs vary across cities, for example Ankara charges a flat rate per litre whereas Istanbul and İzmir charge an increasing rate. Charging for water used by agriculture has been suggested.

=== Investment ===
Annual investments in the Turkish water and sanitation sector at the beginning of the 2000s stood at about US$1 billion per year, or about US$13 per capita and year. The cost for Turkey to comply with the Environmental Acquis Communautaire in water supply and sanitation has been estimated to be in the order of €34 billion for 2007-23 or annual investments of about €2 billion. Additional investments in industrial pollution control would be in the order or €15 billion.

== External Cooperation ==
The major external partners of Turkey in water supply and sanitation are the European Union, France and Germany.

=== European Union ===
The European Union provides 134.3 million Euro of grants in 2007-09 for water supply and sanitation as part of its Instrument for Pre-Accession Assistance (IPA). The first project to be approved under IPA for water and sanitation in Turkey was for a Wastewater Treatment Plant in Ordu. A priority for IPA is the reduction of water losses.

The European Investment Bank also provides loans for water supply and sanitation in Turkey. As of 2010 it had several projects under implementation, of which the most recent one is the Samsun wastewater project signed in 2005 supported with a Euro 30 million loan. In addition, an Environmental Framework Loan for Iller Bank estimated to reach Euro 150 million for water, sanitation and solid waste management was under preparation in 2010.

=== France ===
France provides subsidized loans for municipal infrastructure in Turkish cities through the Agence Française de Développement (AFD). In 2009 AFD provided loans to the cities of Istanbul (120 million Euro), Kayseri (22 million Euro) and Konya (50 million Euro) for urban development, including water supply and sanitation. France also provides a 16 million Euro loan for the treatment of sludge from a wastewater treatment plant in Bursa.

=== Germany ===
Between the late 1980s and 2006 the German government and the state-owned development Bank KfW provided 780 million Euros in grants and soft loans for water supply and sanitation in Turkey with a particular focus on cities in the poorer parts of Turkey. German development cooperation is being implemented by GIZ (technical cooperation) and KfW (financial cooperation) on behalf of the German government.

Germany has financed sanitation projects in Isparta, Tarsus, Siirt, Batman, Van and Diyarbakir, Fethiye and Malatya as well as water supply projects in Istanbul and Adana. In Ankara and Kayseri both water supply and sanitation projects have been supported. Projects are also under implementation in Sivas, Siirt, Batman and Van. The first mechanical-biological wastewater treatment plant in a Turkish metropolitan city, commissioned in 1997 in Ankara, has been financed by German financial cooperation.

GIZ has supported capacity development of staff working in municipal utilities in commercial and technical aspects through a project implemented from 2002 to 2006 in cooperation with the training institute TODAIE.

=== World Bank ===
The World Bank currently finances a municipal services project implemented by Iller Bank. The project, initially approved in 2005, received a first loan of US$275 million and additional financing of US$240 million in 2010. The project finances investments in the cities of Antalya (water supply and sewerage), Denizli(water supply, sewerage and storm water drainage), Mersin (water supply), Beypazari (water supply, sewerage and wastewater treatment), Istanbul (sewerage in the Akfirat area), Kayseri (solid waste landfill) and Kirsehir (water, sewerage and storm water drainage).

The Istanbul Municipal Services Project, supported through a US$336 million loan and approved in 2007, had 43% of its proceeds earmarked for water supply and sanitation.

In the past the World Bank financed, among others, water and sanitation projects in Istanbul from the 1970s to the 1990s, in İzmir and Ankara in the late 1980s and 1990s, as well as in Antalya and Bursa in the late 1990s as well as in the early 2000s. The outcome of the project in Antalya, which involved a public-private partnership, was rated by the World Bank as unsatisfactory, because it was too big, had too many objectives, because of poor risk allocation between the public and the private partners and because there was a mismatch between revenues in local currency and debt in foreign currency.

== Provinces ==
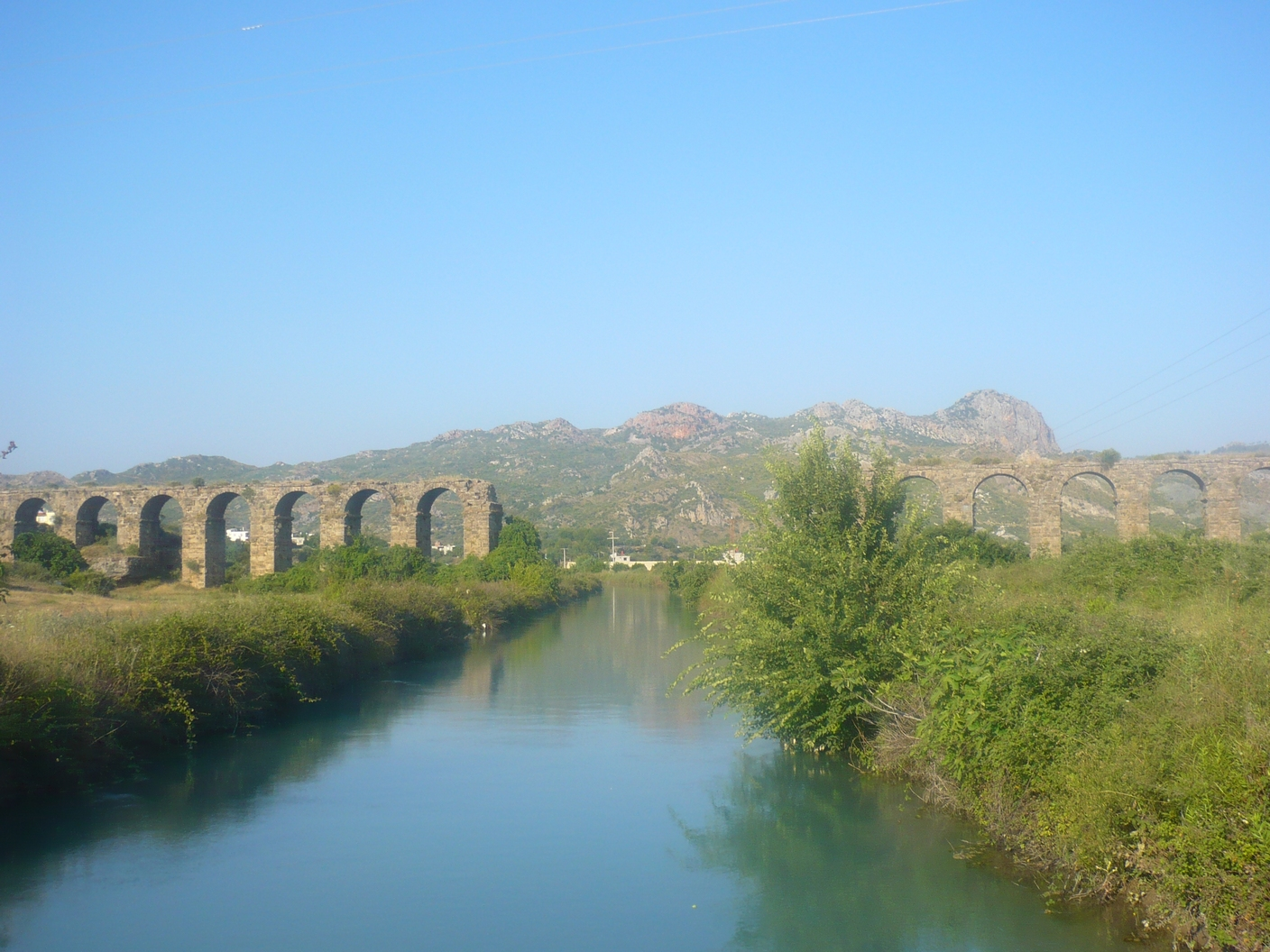
Aqueduct near Aspendos

=== Ankara ===
Per person water use is higher than the global average.

=== Istanbul ===
Water supply and sanitation in Istanbul is stressed by the expansion of the city. It is the responsibility of the public utility ISKI (Istanbul Su ve Kanalizasyon Idaresi) created in 1981.

==== Water sources ====
Nearly all of Istanbul's drinking water (97%) comes from surface water collected in reservoirs. Its most important water sources are the Omerli-Darlik system on the Asian side and the Terkos-Alibeykoy system on the European side. Both systems consist of dams, reservoirs, water treatment plants and pipelines. Many of the reservoirs that supply Istanbul are located within the metropolitan area and are exposed to pollution from settlements without adequate sanitation. Water quality is theoretically controlled by conservation zones around the reservoirs which limit construction and industrial activities in four concentric buffer zones with increasingly strict regulations the closer the zones are to the reservoirs. However, there is little enforcement of these regulations in the face of rapid and often unplanned urbanization. Illegal settlements sprang up around the reservoirs, fueled by land speculation. Subsequently they became de facto legalized with their own municipal administrations elected mayors.

==== Water pollution crisis and response ====
In 1993/94, a severe water shortage had occurred after health authorities forbade ISKI to use water from the Elmali reservoir because of its high concentration of ammonium caused by the discharge of untreated wastewater into the reservoir. ISKI responded by planning and building new reservoirs located further away from the city and associated water treatment plants and pipelines, notably the Istranca dams in the Black Sea basin on the European side of the Bosphorus, and the Yeşilçay Regulator in the Black Sea basin on the Asian side. With these and other investments the available water supply was increased to 1,170 million m^{3} per year.

==== The Melen system ====
However, given the growth of Istanbul, additional water resources were still needed. Therefore the Melen System is being developed to cover the long term water demand of İstanbul. The first stage supplying 268 million m3 was completed in 2007 with Japanese financing. A second and third stage are expected to bring a total of 1,180 billion m^{3} for all three phases to meet the water demand of the city until the year 2040, doubling the amount of water supplied prior to the Melen system. Also, a 5.5 km tunnel under the Bosporus will transfer water to the European side. According to monitoring by four metropolitan agencies drinking water quality is good, reportedly surpassing Turkish as well as EU standards. According to a 2004 survey, 35% of customers stated that they drink water from the tap, up from only 10% in 2000. During that period water quality had improved due to network repairs and the completion of new drinking water treatment plants.

==== Sanitation ====
In 2004 Istanbul's wastewater system consisted of 9,602 km of sewers, 17 pumping stations, 7 pre-treatment plants and 5 biological wastewater treatment plants. 95% of the wastewater collected was being treated. Treated wastewaters are discharged into the Bosphorus. They are discharged into the lower layer, where the flow is towards the Black Sea in the North. The Black Sea has a much greater assimilative capacity than the ecologically more sensitive Marmara Sea to the South. For discharges into the Marmara Sea more expensive tertiary treatment is needed, while primary treatment is sufficient for disposal into the Black Sea. The sewer system consists, in principle, of separate sanitary sewers and stormwater drains. However, in reality there are illegal cross-connections so that untreated wastewater reaches the stormwater drains and contributes to the pollution of drinking water reservoirs.

=== İzmir ===
İzmir is at risk of shortages.

== History and culture ==
The Hittites built Eflatun Pınar. Salt Research is attempting to integrate the arts and sciences in 2025.

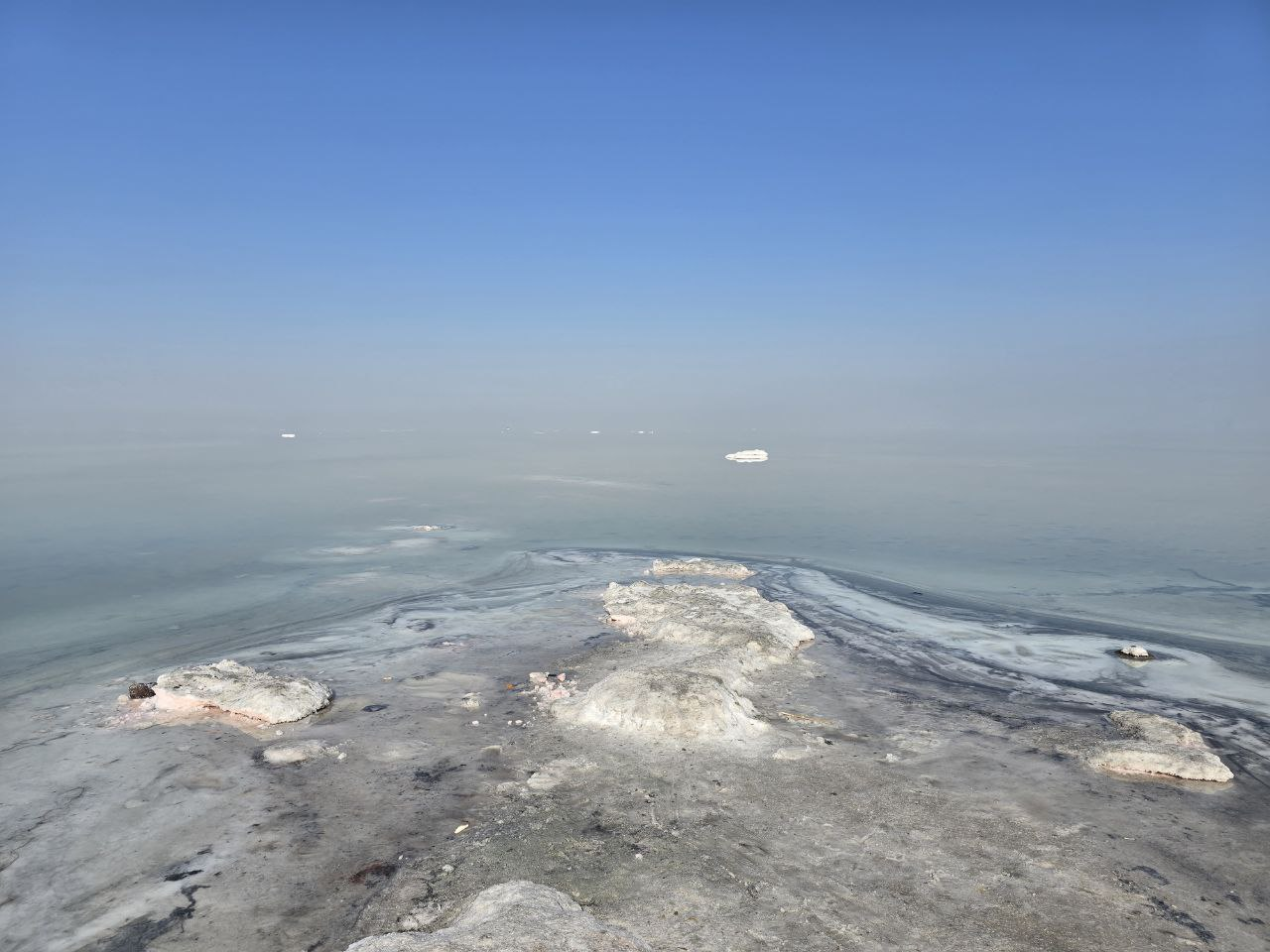
Salt deposits at Lake Urmia, which has dried significantly in the 21st century

A severe water shortage took place in Turkey in 2025. The shortage was caused by climate change, ongoing droughts, mismanagement of water resources, and urban expansion. It affected almost the entire country, including sectors such as agriculture, industry and urban population. As the decline of rainfall and depletion of reservoirs continues, UN experts claim that 88% of Turkey faces desertification in the near future.

== Background ==
The country has been suffering for many years from water shortage, but in 2025 the worst drought in Turkey in over 50 years occurred. In comparison to the previous three decades, rainfall dropped by about 27%, while in some areas in the country, there was 71% less rain than in 2024. The rain shortage caused many reservoirs in major cities like Ankara, Istanbul and İzmir, along with areas like Tekirdağ, the Konya Plain, and southeastern Anatolia, to drop to levels of less than 10%.

The water crisis went beyond an urban water shortage, and had an effect on agriculture, irrigation systems and energy production. All are under significant stress, while at the same time, ecosystems are breaking up, and wetlands and lakes are drying up, leaving animals and vegetation at risk. A 2025 UN report concluded that 88% of Turkey's land area faces desertification by the year 2030. The report says that without taking drastic measures Turkey will face major environmental damage, and water and food shortages.

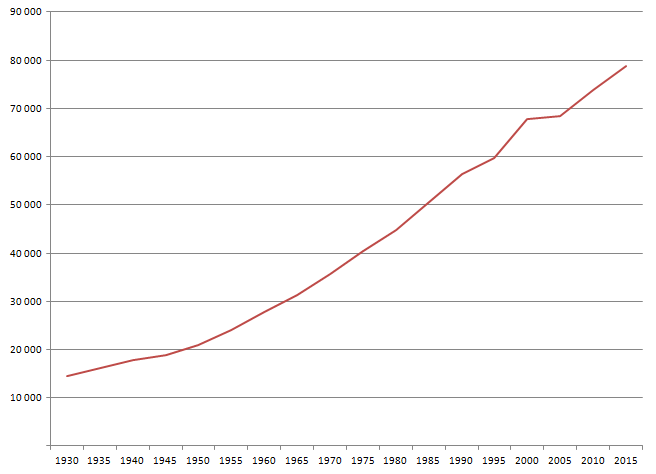
Turkish population in thousands, 1930 to 2015. By 2025 it had reached 86 million.

Reports show there has been a decline in rainfall of 27% in Turkey in comparison to the previous 30 years' average. This is connected to global climate change, and a rise in temperature that increases water evaporation and demand for water. Turkey's growing population, especially in major cities like Istanbul, is weighing heavily on the country's water resources. So are the water demands for the agricultural and industrial sectors. Turkey suffers from water loss through its distribution pipeline networks, resulting in an increase of water shortage. Turkey has no centralized water management system; a large number of agencies manage it separately. This makes it hard for the government to establish water management planning. As water reservoirs in northwestern provinces like Tekirdağ are depleted, causing water shortage, there is growing competition as water curbs and rationing are imposed.

== Impact ==
Istanbul, the largest city in Turkey, suffered from a water shortage in 2025. In September 2025, its reservoir water was just 30% of capacity, when in April it was at 82%. The sharp decline in water level was caused by lack of rainfall and the extreme summer heat. The Naip Dam in Tekirdağ, northwestern Turkey, was emptied by August 2025 due to a 95% decline in rainfall. Local authorities took emergency steps that included digging new wells and diverting irrigation water to domestic use, thus meeting water demand. In the Konya Basin, the 21st century increase in production of water-intensive crops like sugar beet, corn, and alfalfa is part of the reason for the groundwater level dropping by more than a metre a year. By September many of the province's dams had dropped to critical levels.

The drought has had a grave effect on agriculture, mainly in central and southern Turkey. Crop yield has been reduced and 75% of the country's lakes have disappeared in the past 60 years, increasing environmental damage. The dried up areas are in danger of becoming deserts. According to experts, if this situation continues, Turkey will face reduced harvests and nature damage in the near future. Without significant reforms and climate adaptation strategies, Turkey will become a water scarce country by 2050. Central Anatolia, Turkey's main agricultural area, is extremely vulnerable to desertification.

== Sinkholes ==
During 2025, Turkey’s key farming region in Konya province saw an alarming rise in hundreds of sinkholes, numbers are close to 700, across farmland that grows maize, wheat and sugar beet. This surge is linked to extreme drought, climate change and rapidly falling groundwater levels, that are estimates say they are dropping around 4–5 m per year. As water shortage is a growing problem, farmers are drilling many unlicensed wells, that are depleting aquifers and worsening land collapse.

== Response ==
The government's response to the water crisis includes emergency measures of water rationing, especially during periods in which water pipelines are repaired. In March 2025 the government launched a National Water Efficiency Initiative. Its purpose is to save water through education and new tariffs. Heavy users will be charged more than conservative users, so the population will avoid non-essential uses, like watering gardens and washing cars. In September 2025, Turkey with World Bank support launched a $600 million project to manage floods and droughts. It will build new facilities, use nature-based solutions, improve monitoring, and add early warning systems.

== See also ==
- Yeşilçay Drinking Water Plant
