= Life zones of the Mediterranean region =

Mediterranean life zones

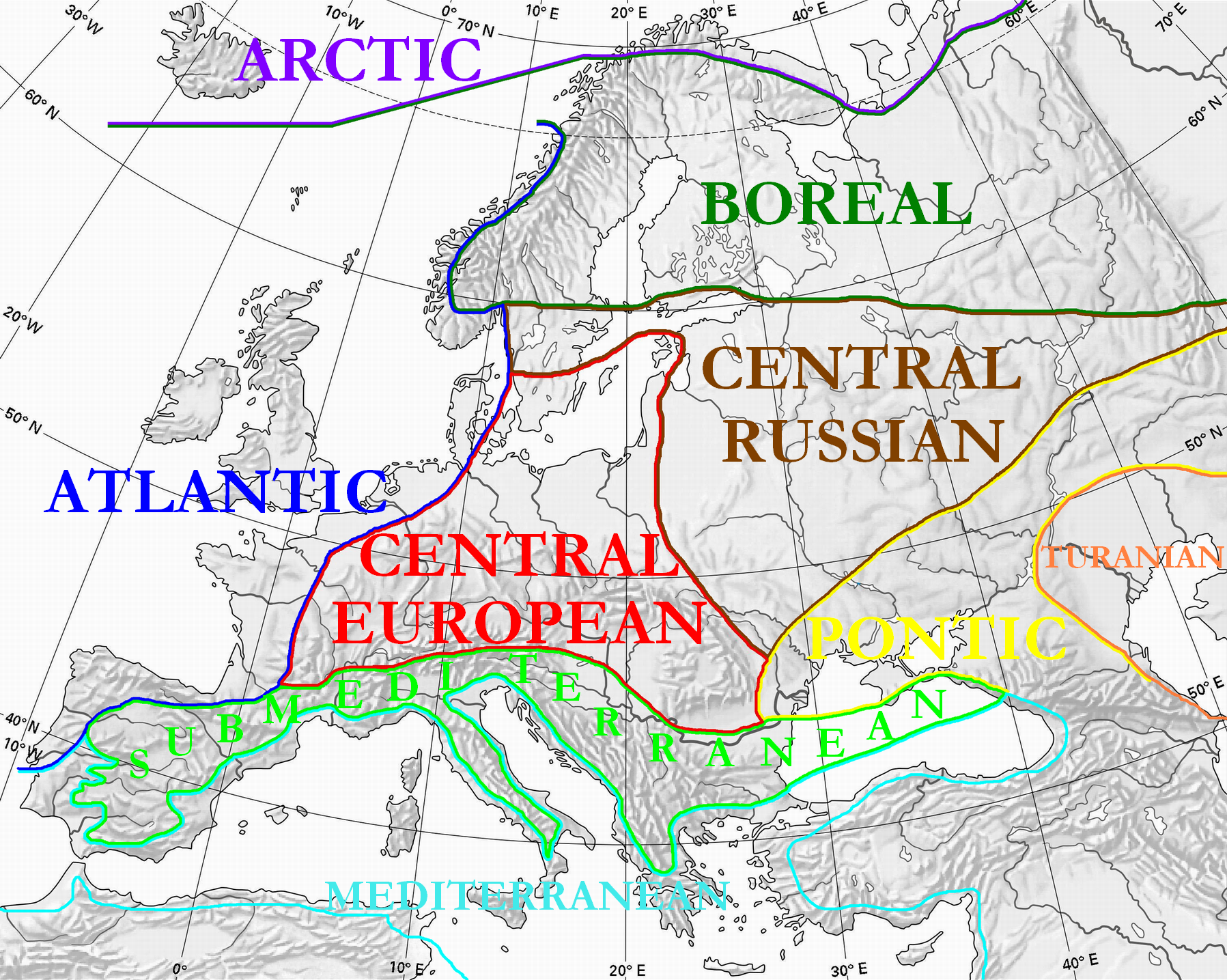
Floristic regions of Europe

The climate and ecology of land immediately surrounding the Mediterranean Sea is influenced by several factors. Overall, the land has a Mediterranean climate, with mild, rainy winters and hot, dry summers. The climate induces characteristic Mediterranean forests, woodlands, and scrub vegetation. Plant life immediately near the Mediterranean is in the Mediterranean Floristic region, while mountainous areas further from the sea supports the Sub-Mediterranean Floristic province.

An important factor in the local climate and ecology of the lands in the Mediterranean basin is the elevation: an increase of elevation by 1,000 metres (3,300 ft) causes the average air temperature to drop by 5 C/ 9 F and decreases the amount of water that can be held by the atmosphere by 30%. This decrease in temperature and increase in rainfall result in altitudinal zonation, where the land can be divided into life zones of similar climate and ecology, depending on elevation.

Mediterranean vegetation shows a variety of ecological adaptations to hot and dry summer conditions. As Mediterranean vegetation differ both in species and composition from temperate vegetation, ecologists use special terminology for the Mediterranean altitudinal zonation:

- Eu-mediterranean belt: 20- 16 °C (avg annual temperature)
- Sub-mediterranean belt: 15- 12 °C
- Hilly region: 11- 8 °C
- Mountainous belt: 7- 4 °C
- Alpine belt: 3- 0 °C
- Subnival belt: 0- minus 4 °C

Even within the Mediterranean Basin, differences in aridity alter the life zones as a function of elevation. For example, the wetter Maritime and Dinaric Alps have a North-Mediterranean zonation pattern, while the southern Apennine Mountains and the Spanish Sierra Nevada have a moderate Eu-Mediterranean zonation pattern. Finally, the drier Atlas Mountains of Africa have a Xero-Mediterranean pattern.

== See also ==
- Köppen climate classification
- Altitudinal zonation
- Biome
- List of terrestrial ecoregions (WWF)
