= Climate change in Turkey =

Impact of global warming on Turkey, mitigation of and adaptation to it

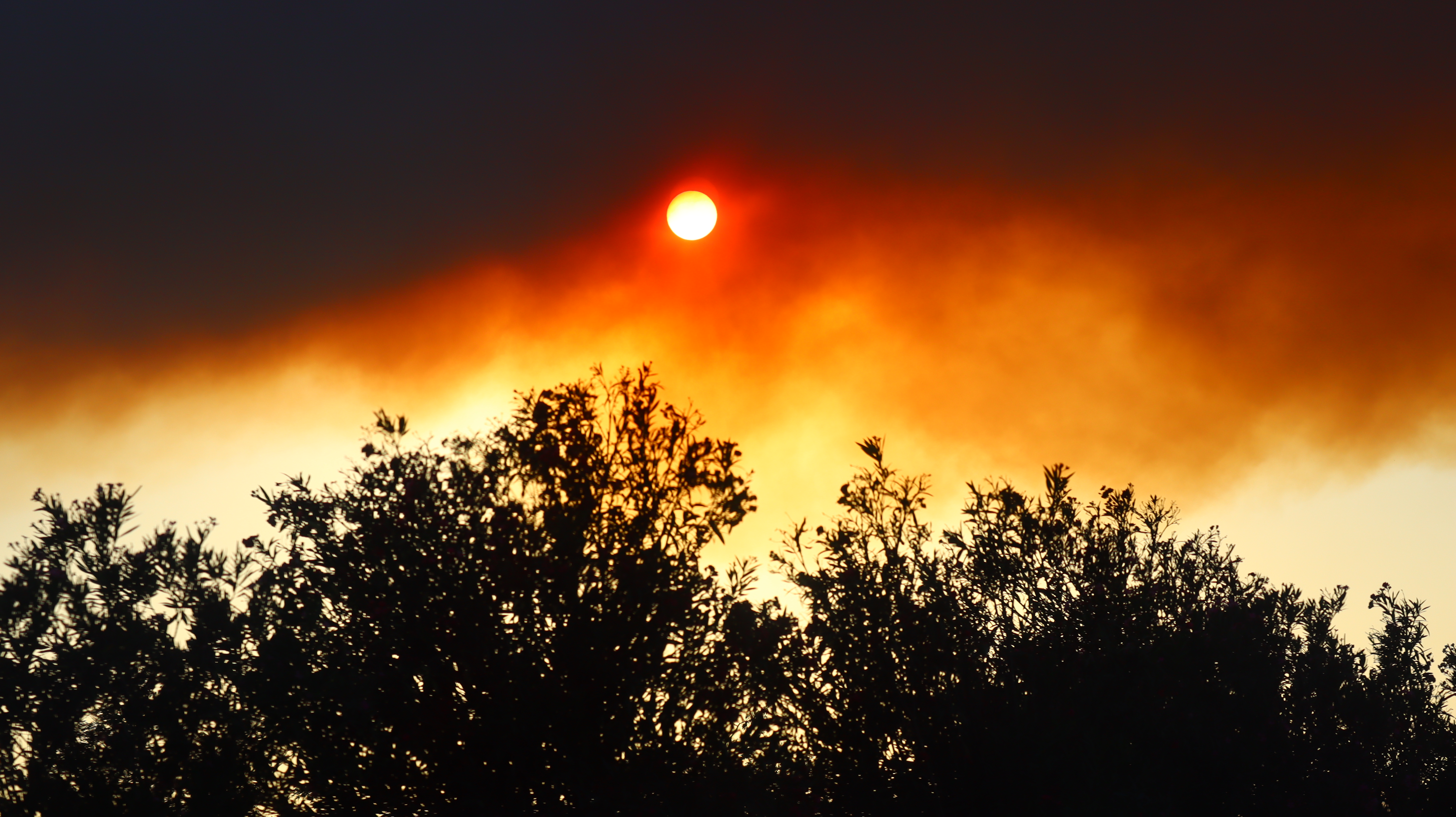
Smoke from a wildfire in 2025: heatwaves are more frequent and longer

Heatwaves and droughts in Turkey are the main hazards due to its climate getting hotter. The temperature has risen in the 21st century, exceeding 50 °C (122 °F) in 2025, and there is more extreme weather. Due to differing geography effects vary across the country. Water supply to some cities is threatened. Turkey will host the 2026 United Nations Climate Change Conference and its president Murat Kurum says that climate finance is the most important issue.

Turkey's annual greenhouse gas emissions are over 1% of the global total, and energy policy includes subsidizing both fossil gas and coal. Per person emissions since the late-2010s have varied around six and a half tonnes a year, which is about the global average. However historical emissions are less than 1% of the global total.

The Directorate of Climate Change co-ordinates adaptation to climate change, which has been planned for water resources by river basin, and for agriculture. Certificate caps in the emission trading system are unclear as of 2026. Housing is not energy efficient, the pathway to the 2053 net zero target is unclear, and there is no plan for coal phase-out.

== Greenhouse gas emissions ==
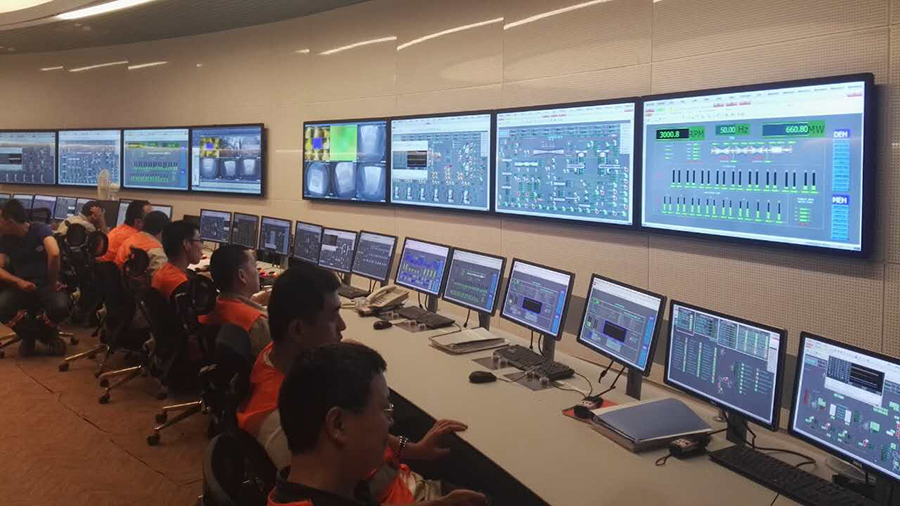
Coal-fired power stations, such as the ZETES power stations, are the largest source of greenhouse gas.

Coal, cars and lorries vent more than a third of Turkey's annual greenhouse gas emissions, which total about six hundred million tonnes. They are mostly carbon dioxide and part of the cause of climate change in Turkey. A quarter of the emissions are from electricity generation.

The government estimated 2024 emissions at 517.4 Mt with and 584.5 Mt without Land use, land-use change, and forestry (LULUCF), and uncertainty at 7.9%, or 5.1% without LULUCF. Climate Trace estimate 646 million tonnes (Mt) of greenhouse gas (GHG) was emitted in 2025 excluding LULUCF, and 43 Mt from LULUCF. Their estimate of 72 Mt of GHG from waste in 2023 and 2024 and 2025 is much higher than the official figure of 15 Mt in 2023 and 2024. Official figures do not detail individual sources, but the largest in 2025 according to Climate Trace were ZETES power stations, Istanbul Airport, Cenal power station, İÇDAŞ Biga power station and Isdemir Payas steel plant. The Transnational Institute estimated 2023 military emissions at 4.7 million tonnes, but this estimate may not have used official NATO methodology.

The energy sector, including transport, emitted 420 million tonnes in 2024. The nation's coal-fired power stations emit the most carbon dioxide, and road vehicles running on petrol or diesel are also significant. After coal and oil the third most polluting fuel is fossil gas; which is burnt in Turkey's gas-fired power stations, homes and workplaces. Much methane is belched by livestock; cows alone produce half of the greenhouse gas from agriculture in Turkey.

Economists say that major reasons for Turkey's greenhouse gas emissions are subsidies for coal-fired power stations, and the lack of a price on carbon pollution.

Turkey's share of current global greenhouse gas emissions is slightly over 1%. Annual per person emissions are six and a half tonnes, which is around the global average. Although greenhouse gas totals are reported some details, such as the split between cars and lorries, are not published.

The government supports reforestation, electric vehicle manufacturing and low-carbon electricity generation; and is aiming for net zero carbon emissions by 2053. But its long-term plan omits coal phase-out, and there is no clear pathway to net zero. Turkey's nationally determined contribution to the Paris Agreement on limiting climate change is 643 million tonnes in 2035, which has been criticized as an increase on current emissions. In 2024 environment minister Murat Kurum said that by Turkey's net zero year of 2053 half of primary energy would be from renewables and 30% from nuclear, but did not explain how the remaining 20% could be decarbonized. Although carbon emission trading is due to start its pilot phase, unless Turkey's climate and energy policies are changed the 2053 net zero target may be missed.

Coal-fired power stations emit the most, followed by diesel fuel burned in lorries and other road vehicles.

Turkey emitted 585 Mt of GHG in 2024. Istanbul Policy Center has suggested a total national carbon budget of about 13 Gt after 2023, as a part of the global carbon budget to keep below 2 degrees. Per-person emissions are around the world average, at around 7 t in 2024. Turkey's cumulative CO_{2} emissions are estimated at around 13 Gt, which is less than 1% of the world's cumulative total (Turkey's population is about 1% of world population). Turkey's emissions can be looked at differently to the standard IPCC classification: for example a 2021 study by Izmir University of Economics estimated that food, "from farm to fork", accounts for about a third of national emissions, which is similar to the global emissions share of food.

=== Monitoring, reporting and verification ===
As in most countries carbon dioxide, mostly from burning fossil fuels, is the main GHG

Monitoring, reporting and verification (MRV) includes tracking national GHG emissions and action to limit them, and sharing information and lessons learned. The Directorate of Climate Change and Turkish government's Statistical Institute (Turkstat) follow the United Nations Framework Convention on Climate Change (UNFCCC) reporting guidelines, so use production-based GHG accounting to compile the country's greenhouse gas inventory. Using consumption-based accounting would give a similar total. Turkstat sends the data to the UNFCCC annually during the second year following the reported year, for example 2023 emissions were reported in 2025 in the annual National Inventory Document (NID) and Common Reporting Tables (CRT). In years when a Biennial transparency report (BTR) is submitted to the UNFCCC the data may be included with the report, as was done in 2024 with Turkey's first BTR. Emissions from fuels sold in the country for international aviation and shipping are accounted separately in reports to the UNFCCC, and are not included in a country's total. In 2024 jet kerosene, supplied at Turkish airports and burnt by international flights, emitted 15 Mt CO_{2}e (carbon dioxide equivalent); (there are also indirect effects from contrails and ozone) and diesel oil and residual fuel oil from Turkish ports powering international shipping 2 Mt CO_{2}e.

The Intergovernmental Panel on Climate Change (IPCC) defines three methodological tiers to measure emissions. Tier 1 uses global defaults and simplified assumptions, so is the easiest but least accurate. Tier 2 uses country specific values and more detailed data. Tier 3 uses the most detailed data and modelling, so is the most difficult to compile but the most accurate. To make best use of human resources each nation may decide to only use higher tiers to estimate its particular "key categories". Turkstat selects these categories depending on either the absolute level of emissions from that category, or whether it is trending, or uncertain. For example, CO2 from lime production was a key category for 2024 solely because of its quickly rising emissions: most of the key categories selected in 2024 are both trending up and the largest emitting sectors, cement production for example. Turkey uses Tier 2 and Tier 3 methodology for some key categories, for example a power plant might analyse the lignite it burns, which differs from mine to mine. Turkey has a high rate of car ownership even in urban areas,and although road transport is a key category, it is not split between cars and lorries as is done in some countries. In 2021 the UNFCCC asked Turkey why it reported negligible indirect GHGs (carbon monoxide, nitrogen oxides, non-methane volatile organic compounds and sulfur oxides) in 2018. Legislation for the Turkish Emissions Trading System to monitor some private sector emissions was passed in 2026, but does not include methane from biomass such as waste.

=== Greenhouse gas sources ===
==== Fossil fuels ====
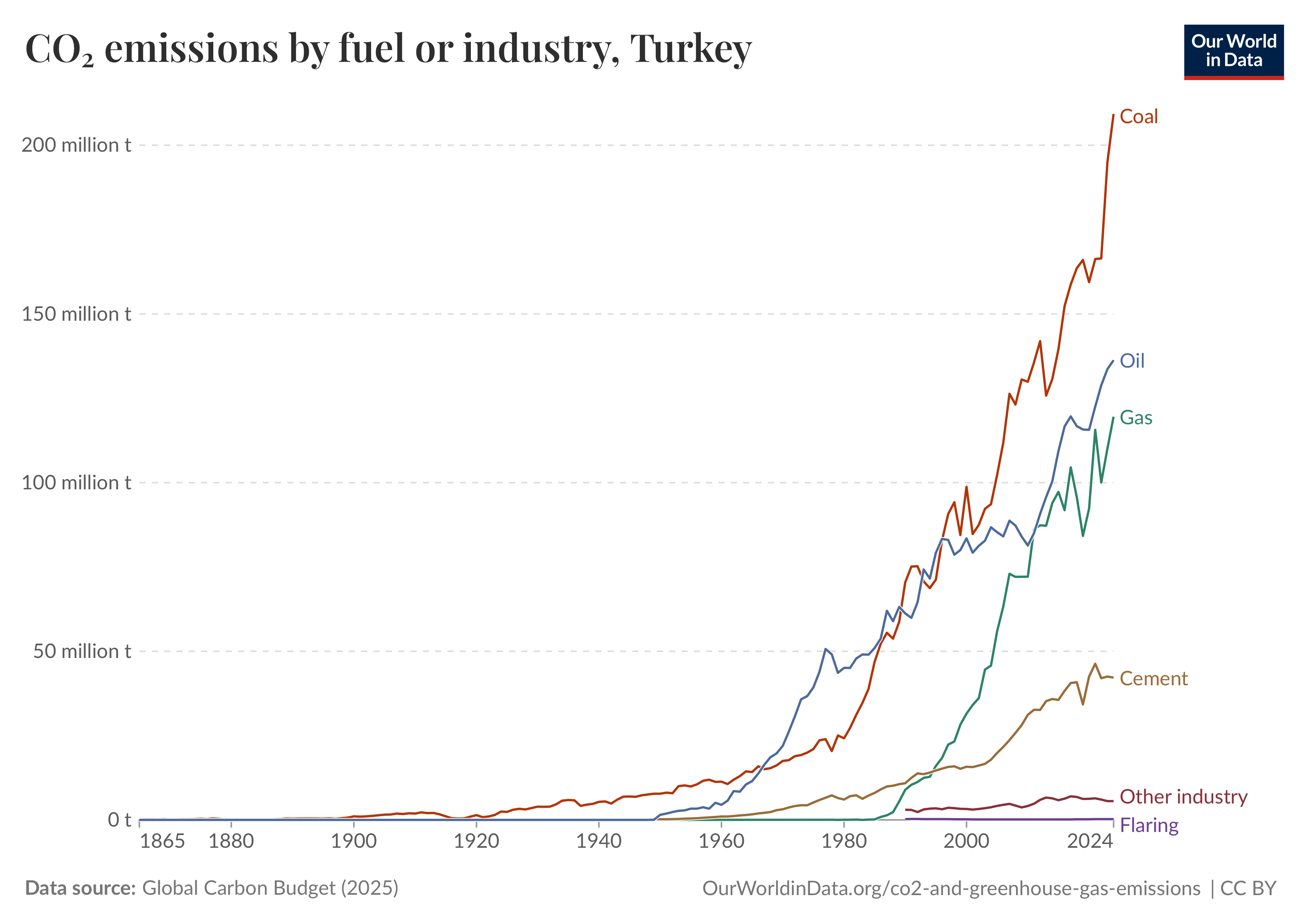
Emissions from gas increased, but remain far below coal. Emissions from oil products, such as petrol and diesel, increased more slowly than gas and coal.

Burning coal in Turkey was the largest emitter in 2024, followed by oil then gas. That year, Turkey's energy sector emitted over 70% of the country's GHG, mostly through electricity generation, followed by road transport. (Note: Under IPCC guidelines, the energy sector includes fuel for transport.) In contrast agriculture contributed 13% of emissions and industrial processes and product use (IPPU) also 13%. Carbon capture and storage is not economically viable. The GHG emission intensity of energy consumption is higher than in the EU.

Turkey expects to greatly increase gas production. In 2021, IEA head Fatih Birol called for fossil-fuel producing countries to include limits on methane leaks in their climate pledges, but as of 2026 Turkey has not signed the global methane pledge.

Production of public heat and electricity emitted 150 megatonnes of CO_{2}e in 2024, mainly through coal burning. (Note: The carbon content (t/TJ), oxidation factor and CO_{2} emission intensity (t/TJ NCV), respectively, of lignite burnt in Turkish power stations in 2021 was as follows: lignite: 30, 0.97, 104; The extremely low-quality lignite is explained in detail in Coal in Turkey. The CO_{2} emission intensity (or emission factor) shown above is the mass of CO_{2} emitted for each unit of heat produced by burning a fuel. In contrast, the grid emission intensity is the mass of CO_{2}e produced per unit of electricity supplied to the electrical grid. Because thermal power stations generally convert less than half of the heat energy into electrical energy, their numbers for grid emission intensity are much greater than the emission intensity figures shown above.) Investment in wind and solar is hampered by subsidies for coal.

Subsidized coal burnt by poor families contributes a bit to climate change, and more importantly its soot pollutes local air. Residential fuel, such as natural gas and coal, contributed 51 Mt CO_{2}e in 2024. Burning fossil fuels such as coal and natural gas for commercial and institutional buildings, such as for heating, emitted 13 Mt CO_{2}e in 2024. According to the Ministry of Energy and Natural Resources, "The energy sector, which is an emission-intensive and resource-intensive sector, will be one of the sectors that will be most affected by the regulations brought or to be brought by [the Paris and UNFCCC] agreements. In this context, our country is determined to use its energy resources effectively, efficiently and with the least impact on the environment, within the framework of sustainable development goals.". (Note: The goals they are referring to may be Sustainable Development Goal 7 and Sustainable Development Goal 13)

===== Coal-fired power stations =====
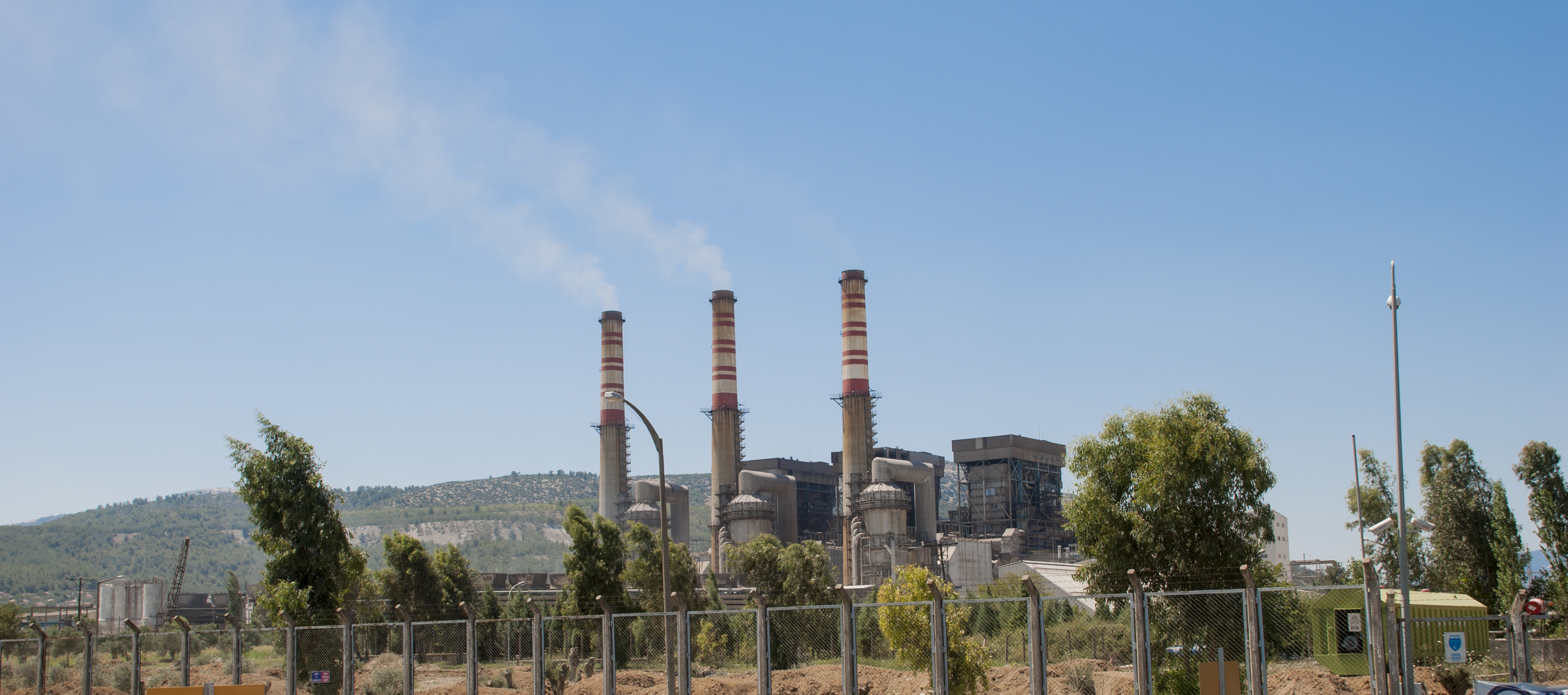
Some old power stations like Yatağan pollute but are subsidized.

Turkey's coal-fired power stations are the largest source of greenhouse gas emissions by Turkey, at 123 Mt (over 20% of national emissions) in 2024. Over a kilogram of CO_{2} is emitted for every KWh of electricity generated in Turkey by coal-fired power stations.

Almost all coal burnt in power stations is local lignite or imported bituminous (hard) coal. Coal analysis of Turkish lignite shows that it is high in ash and moisture, low in energy value and high in emission intensity; that is Turkish lignite emits more CO_{2} than other countries' lignites. When carbon dioxide (CO_{2}) from coal used by industry and for heating buildings, and methane emissions from coal mining, are added to those from coal-fired electricity generation, over 30% of Turkey's annual emissions come from coal. In 2024, burning coal emitted 159 Mt CO_{2} in total. Methane leaks from coal mines in 2024 were equivalent to 7 Mt CO_{2}. Eren Holding (via Eren Enerji's coal-fired ZETES power stations) emits over 2% of Turkey's GHG, and İÇDAŞ emits over 1% from its Bekirli coal-fired power stations. Emissions of black carbon are not published for individual power stations, as Turkey has not ratified the Gothenburg Protocol on air pollution.

===== Gas-fired power stations =====
Gas-fired power stations emitted 27 Mt CO_{2}e in 2024. Electricity generation from gas tends to increase when hydropower is limited by droughts. The cost of natural gas is expected to fall in the late 2020s with the expiry of expensive import agreements with Russia and Iran, and increasing production from the Sakarya Gas Field in the Black Sea.

===== Transport =====
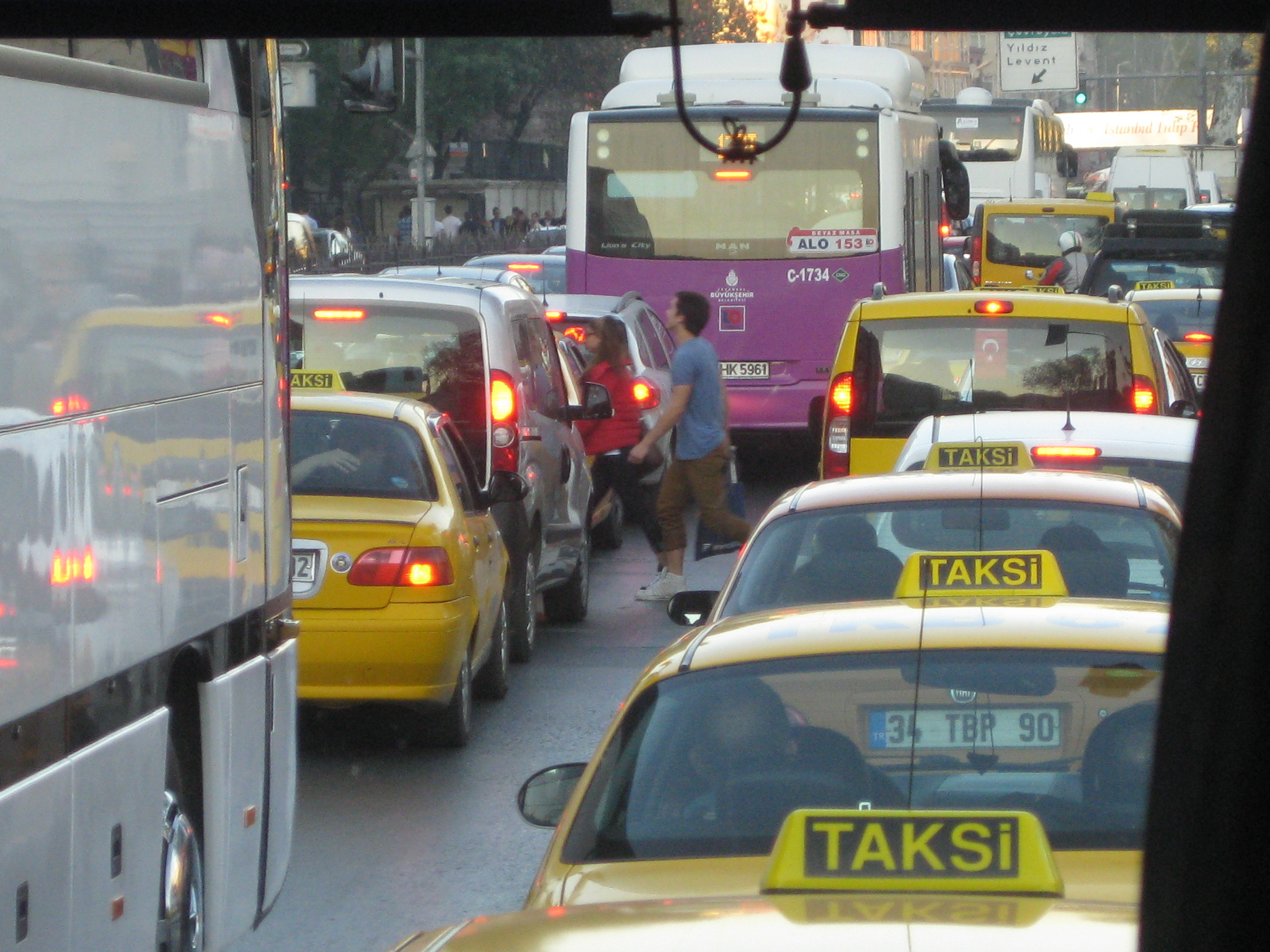
A traffic jam in Istanbul, one of the few major European cities without a low-emission zone.

Transport emitted 101 Mt of CO_{2}e in 2024, a bit over one tonne per person, over 90% from road transport in the country (and agricultural vehicles). Over half of Turkey's transport emissions come from diesel fuel burnt in road vehicles, but the proportion from cars compared to other vehicles such as lorries is not known. The train network is underused and, unlike some other countries, as of 2026 Turkey has no binding transport specific targets. Fuel quality and emissions standards for new cars are less strict than those in the EU. Domestic flights (Note: Emissions from international trips are not included in a country's emissions total, but fuel sales for international aviation can be found in Common Reporting Format category 1.A.3.a.1A. Turkey has joined the Carbon Offsetting and Reduction Scheme for International Aviation.) emitted 4 Mt of CO_{2}e in 2024.

==== Industry ====
In 2024, Turkey's industrial sector emitted 76 Mt (13%) of GHG. IEA head Fatih Birol has said that the country has a lot of potential for renewable energy. Some sugar factories, such as some owned by Türkşeker and Konya Seker, burn coal for the heat needed to make sugar and sometimes to generate electricity. Some industrial companies reach the Global Reporting Initiative GRI 305 emissions standard. CBAM may make fertilizer exports uneconomic.

===== Cement =====
Turkey is the sixth-largest cement producer in the world and the largest in Europe, and by far the largest exporter to the EU. Cement (clinker) production in 2024 emitted 45 Mt CO_{2}, 8% of the country's total GHG. Climate Trace has estimated the contributions of individual factories, sometimes from kiln heat visible from satellites, and says that Nuh, Göltaş, and Medcem cement plants emitted more than 1 Mt each in 2023. Nuh publish information about their emissions and say some of their cement is low emission, and Medcem publishes some figures whereas Göltaş has less GHG info. As of 2026 most producers report about 0.8 tonnes CO2eq per tonne cement.

Turkey's construction sector uses cement. Cement producers in the EU have to buy EU carbon credits, and say the CBAM is needed to protect them from unfair competition, as Turkish companies pay no carbon price as of 2026. The CBAM could be up to 50% on the cement price. The proportion of clinker in publicly procured cement is being reduced.

===== Iron, steel and aluminium =====
Turkish steel, primarily from minimills, averages about one tonne of CO_{2} per tonne of steel produced. Although this average is less polluting than China, three steelworks—Erdemir, İsdemir and Kardemir—use blast furnaces and thus emit more than those using electric arc furnaces. The EU Carbon Border Adjustment Mechanism (CBAM) includes a carbon tariff on Turkish steel produced in blast furnaces, but the CBAM could help arc furnaces compete against products such as Chinese steel. Companies are investing in solar power in Turkey. Aluminium is carbon-intensive at almost 9 tCO₂e per tonne.

==== Agriculture and fishing ====
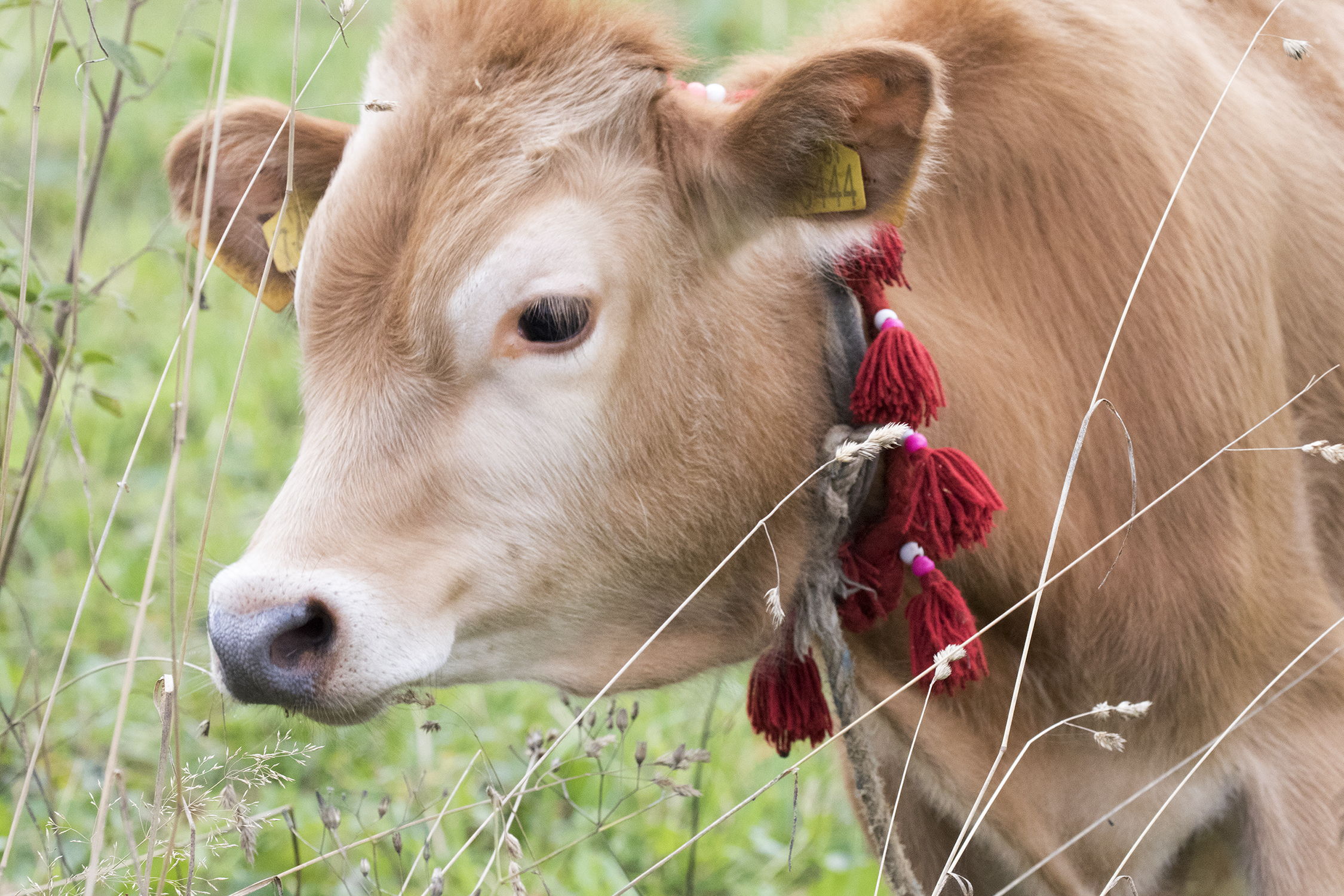
Around half of agricultural emissions are from cows.

Agriculture accounted for 74 Mt which was 13% of Turkey's total 2024 GHG, including 62% of its methane emissions and 78% of its nitrous oxide emissions. These are due primarily to enteric fermentation, agricultural soils, and synthetic fertilizer application. Cattle emit about half of the GHG from agriculture, made up in 2024 of 30 Mt from enteric fermentation and 7 Mt from manure management.

About three quarters of red meat production in Turkey is beef. Turks eat an average of 15 kilograms (33 lb) of beef per person each year (which is more than the world average), and the country produced 1 million tonnes of beef in 2021. Cattle are subsidized by the "Rural Prosperity, Livestock Support Project" until 2028. VAT on meat and dairy is 1% like other "staple foods". Being ruminants sheep, goats and cattle belch methane. Fertilizers can emit the GHG nitrous oxide, but estimates of the effects of government policy on the agricultural and waste sectors' emissions are lacking. Turkey is one of the top ten nitrous oxide emitters. Production of plastic, such as for agriculture, may release significant GHG in future. National GHG inventories do not yet include bottom trawling, such as in parts of the Black Sea, as the IPCC has yet to issue accounting guidelines. Bottom trawling is forbidden in some parts of Marine Protected Areas. In 2024 the government said that farming subsidies would be "reviewed through the lens of climate change".

==== Waste ====
Municipalities collect about 1 kg of waste per person per day. The government says the waste sector contributed 15 Mt (3%) of Turkey's 2024 GHG, with almost half of that from the tenth of waste sent to unmanaged landfills. However Climate Trace estimates CO2e from solid waste disposal at 68 Mt in 2025. Senem Abak at Boğaziçi University has suggested possible reasons for this large discrepancy; perhaps the differences in methodology, or official figures could be missing some open burning. Turkey says that as of 2026 its Zero Waste Project has avoided about 180 Mt of emissions, in part avoiding methane emissions by separate collection, composting and anaerobic digestion.

Satellite methane measurements in 2025 and 2026 highlight landfill sites serving Istanbul (such as one in Seymen, Silivri) and Izmir as large emitters. Completely phasing out the little remaining open dumping is important, and in 2026 an academic claimed that MSW could become a carbon sink by 2035 by recovering materials and energy.

Landfilling is the most common waste-disposal method. Climate Trace estimate Odayeri (even though it has a biogas facility) on the European side of Istanbul to have been by far the biggest single emitter of methane from waste in 2025 with 3.6 Mt CO2e. Organic waste sent to landfills emits methane, but the country is working to improve its waste and resource management. One third of organic waste is composted, but others argue for incineration. Some refrigerants are sent to Turkey from other countries for destruction.

== Climate ==
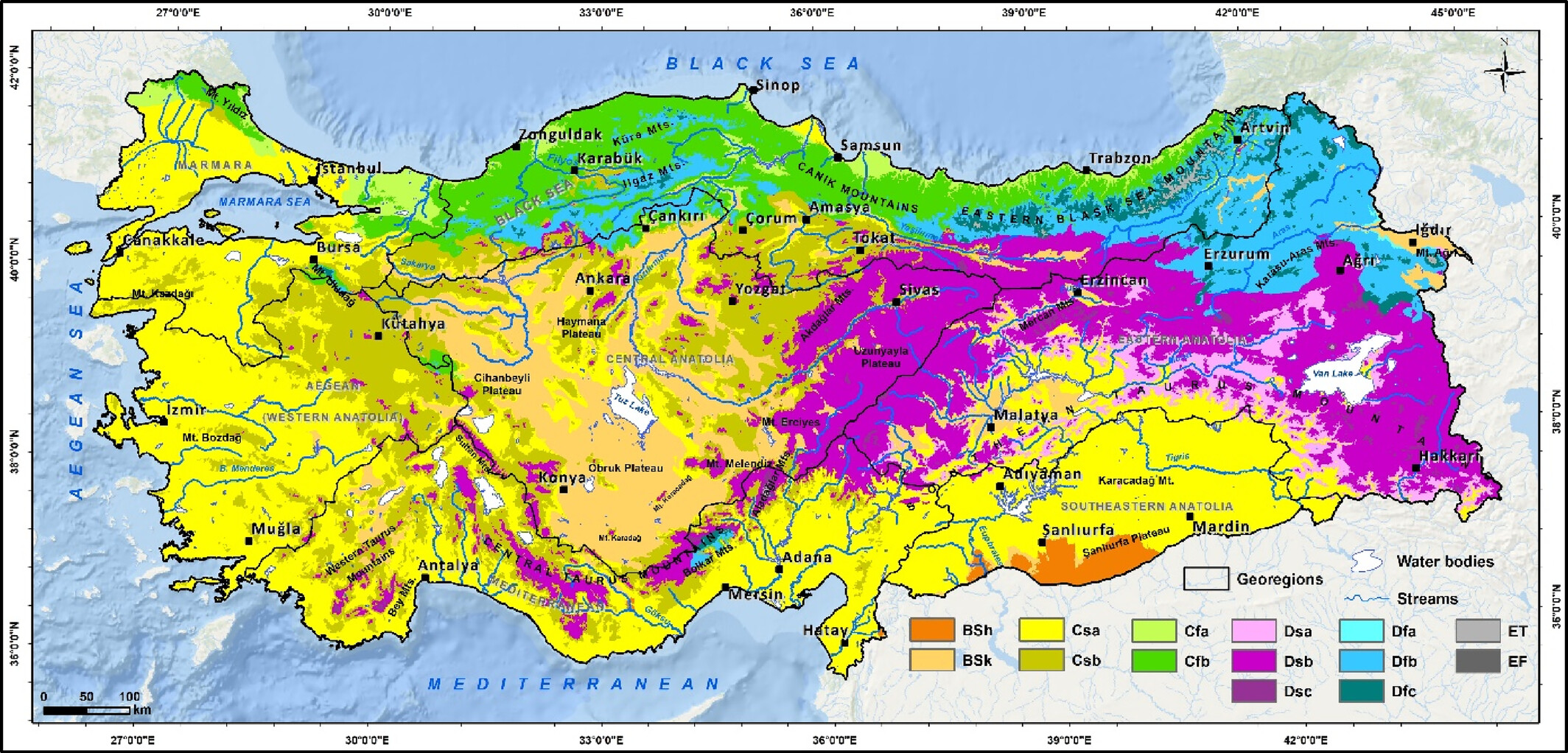
Köppen climate types of Turkey

Turkey's climate is varied and generally temperate, with the regions bordering the Mediterranean and Black Sea heavily affected by the coasts, and the interior being drier and more continental.

Coastal areas in the southern half of the country; including Antalya, İzmir, and Adana; have a typical Mediterranean climate, with hot, dry summers and mild, rainy winters. Coastal areas in the north are cooler and are either humid temperate or sub-Mediterranean, with cool, frequently rainy and occasionally snowy winters, and warm summers.

The lower plateaus of the interior are generally continental, with hot, dry summers, and cold, snowy winters. Winter precipitation varies widely, with lots of snow in areas like Bitlis, while rain-shadowed areas are semi-arid. On higher elevations, plateaus that nevertheless allow permanent settlement, like Kars and Ardahan, are high-continental and sometimes subalpine, with frigid, snowy winters, and mild, rainy summers.

Dry summers in the south and west, along with moderate aridity in the interior makes the country vulnerable to climate change.

== Impacts on the natural environment ==
According to Boğaziçi University's Center for Climate Change and Policy Studies, human-caused climate change in Turkey started in the 1970s. Turkey is forecast to be more severely affected than many other countries, but effects vary considerably across its regions. Coupled Model Intercomparison Project#CMIP Phase 6 (CMIP6) models it well, however the CMIP6 Multi-Model Ensemble Mean is too coarse a resolution (2° × 1.5°) for the higher parts of Turkey.

One example of climate change's impact will be on the distribution of rainfall: the expansion of the Hadley cell (an area of circulation near the equator) may move the descending edge northwards towards Turkey, whose southern border is around 36 degrees north, and this may reduce rainfall.

=== Temperature and weather changes ===
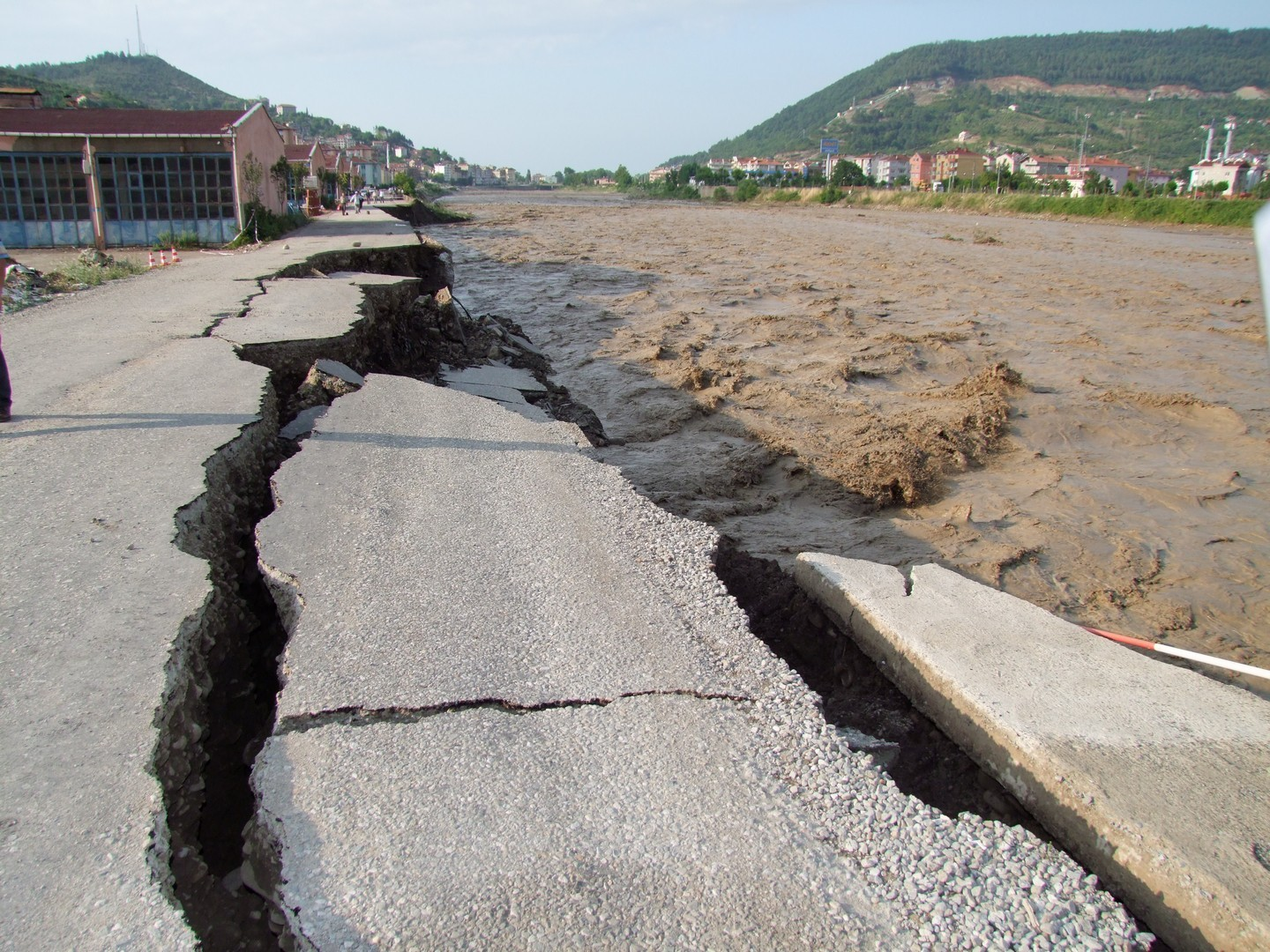
Floods in Turkey may become more frequent in parts of the country, as here in Sinop.

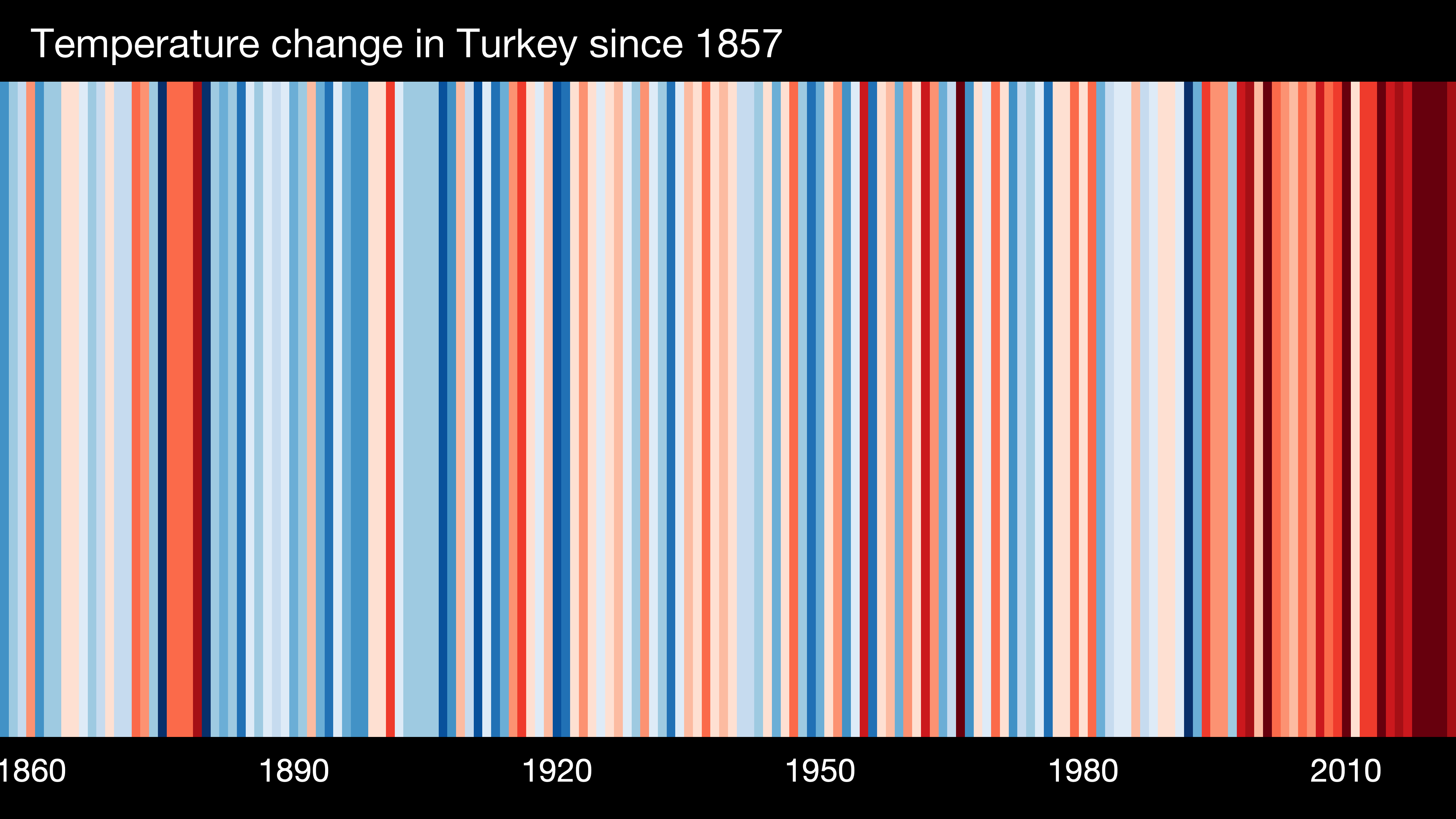
Warming stripes showing variation from the average temperature in Turkey over 120 years

Köppen climate classification map for Turkey, for the current climate period

2071–2100 map under a mid-range, relatively likely climate change scenario

The temperature has been increasing since at least the 1980s. As of 2026, the hottest year (since international standard measurements began in 1971) was 2024, followed by 2010, 2018, 2023 and 2025. As of 2026 the OECD thinks that with a low-carbon scenario the rise can be kept below 1.7 degrees. Heatwaves and droughts are increasing, at least in some parts of the country. Wildfires in Turkey have increased due to climate change, and wind speed is predicted to increase throughout the Marmara region.

The weather is becoming more extreme, especially rainfall, for example in 2021 there were extensive wildfires in the south and floods in the north. More floods are predicted, due to rainfall replacing snow. Total precipitation did not change much in the 35 years before 2025, but may decrease and become more variable.

==== Heatwaves ====
Heatwaves in Turkey are a hazard and are predicted to last much longer due to climate change in Turkey. The definition of a heatwave includes affecting a large area, being at least 5 degrees above normal and lasting at least 2 days, with high humidity. Heat waves have increased since 1950. In July 2025 there were record breaking temperatures, like the 2025 European heatwaves.

=== Water ===
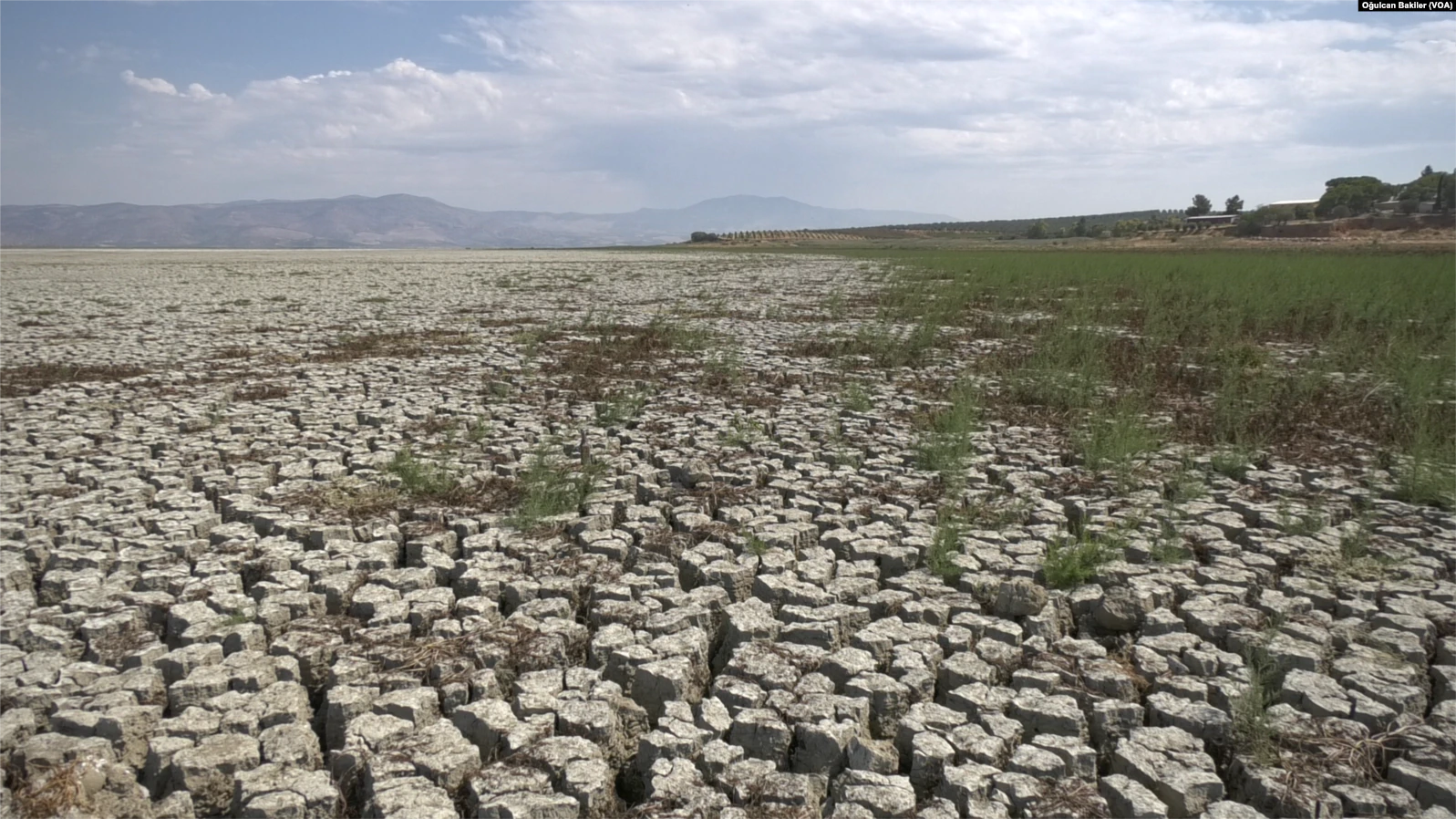
Lake Marmara has completely dried out; perhaps there is not enough rainfall for upstream irrigation dams.

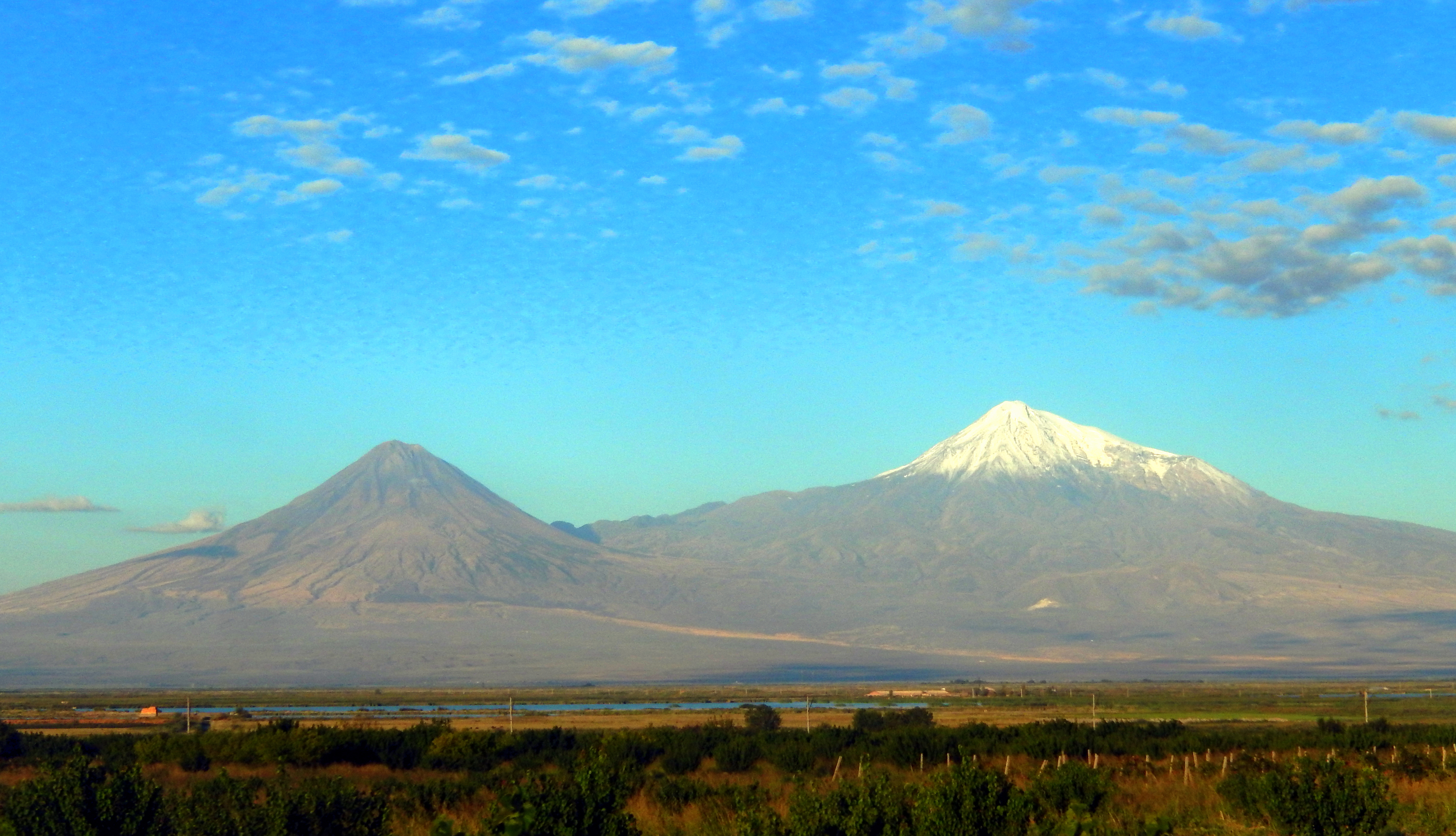
Mount Ararat's glacier is retreating due to climate change, and will be gone before the end of the century.

River basins of Turkey also showing where they extend into neighbouring countries

Climate change has reduced rainfall in some regions and has made it less regular, which has put stress on hydroelectric power plants. Between 1979 and 2019 annual precipitation fluctuated from over 60 cm to under 45 cm, and average annual temperatures varied by 4 degrees. Dams are collecting less drinking water due to reduced pricipitation due to climate change.

Turkey is already a water stressed country, because the amount of water per person is only about 1,500 cubic metres (53,000 cu ft) a year: and due to population increase and climate change it is highly likely the country will suffer water scarcity (less than 1,000 m³) by the 2070s. Higher temperatures can increase evaporation from lakes, making them more saline. Little change has been forecast for water resources in the northern river basins, but a substantial reduction has been forecast for the southern river basins. Konya in central Turkey is also vulnerable. Charging for water used by agriculture has been suggested.

Over 200 thousand people live in areas at risk if sea level rises by 1 meter. The Aegean rose by an estimated 4 mm a year in the early 21st century. Istanbul is at risk from sea level rise; for example, Kadıkoy metro station is threatened with flooding. Tectonic uplift has decreased sea level rise between Samsun and Alanya, whereas several large river deltas have subsided.

=== Ecosystems ===
In coastal areas permanent wetlands, croplands and grassland are affected. Climate models predict that extreme weather events will increase in the Mediterranean Region. Glaciers in Turkey are retreating: the largest remaining are the glaciers on Mount Ararat and these are forecast to be gone before the end of the century, as they are melting much faster than mountain glaciers in many other parts of the world. The Cilo glaciers are also shrinking. Because the climate in the south is forecast to become hotter and drier it may be very difficult to keep the current southern forests in Turkey. In the Marmara and Mediterreanean regions wildfires are associated with the warming trend of the Eastern Mediterranean Basin. The rise in sea surface temperature is one of the causes of marine mucilage in the Sea of Marmara, and is expected to further change marine life in Turkish waters. The sea surface temperature of the Black Sea has increased by almost 2 degrees. There are concerns of brown bears not hibernating, and some white storks no longer migrate south in winter. Soil in Turkey continues to be eroded and is forecast to increase.

== Impacts on people ==
=== Health impacts ===
Climate change may impact health in Turkey, for example due to increased heatwaves, especially elderly and chronically ill people and children. Wildfires in Turkey were the worst in the history of the republic in 2021 and killed several people and injured hundreds. Droughts risk mosquito borne diseases. The Health Ministry will plan.

=== Economic impacts ===
Although climate related economic losses are much lower than in the EU they increased over the early 2020s. Environment Minister Murat Kurum estimated in 2021 that losses due to disasters, such as floods, caused by climate change would amount to billions of lira (hundreds of millions of dollars). The World Bank has estimated the cost and benefits of stopping net carbon emissions, but has suggested government do far more detailed planning. Companies which responded to the Carbon Disclosure Project in 2025 saw somewhat more climate opportunity than risk.

According to the United Nations Development Programme, decreasing rainfall is exacerbating the wide social and regional disparities within Turkey, and the gap between south-eastern provinces and the rest of the country is widening.

==== Agriculture ====
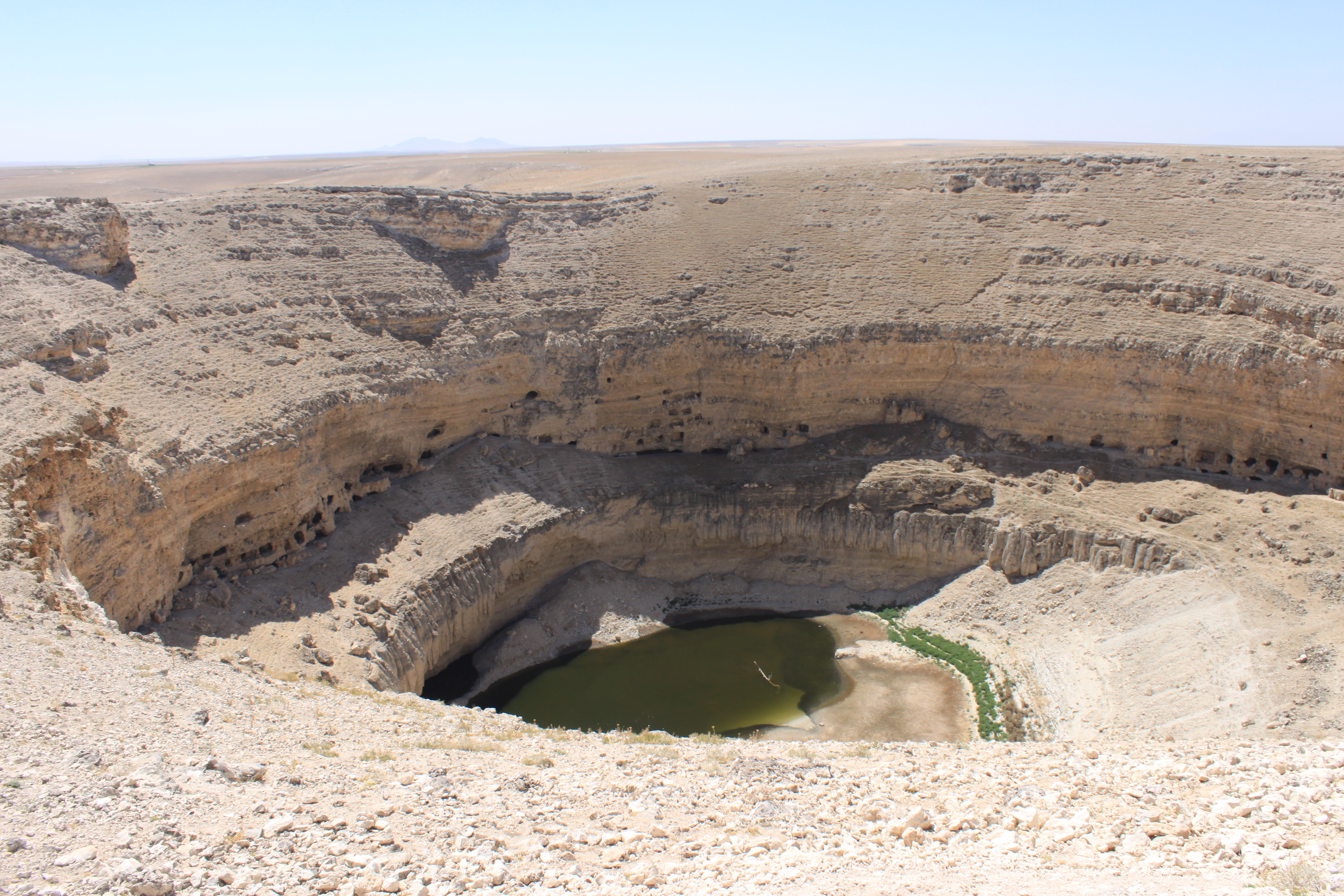
Karst lakes like Çıralı Lake are drying due to climate change and excessive groundwater extraction

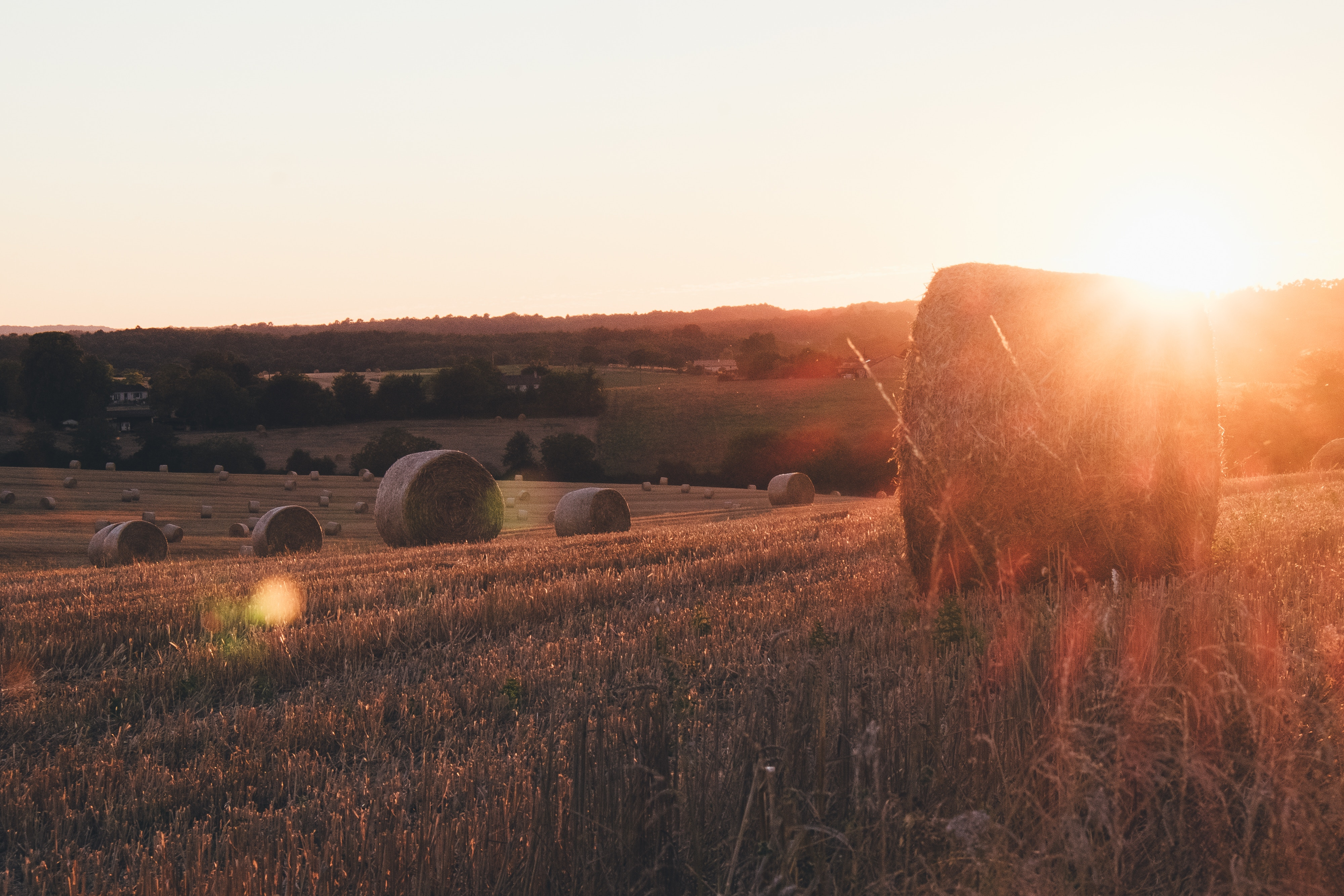
Wheat may be severely affected.

Unless global emissions are greatly reduced agriculture in Turkey, such as wheat, is expected to be severely affected after the late 2030s, especially in areas with rain fed agriculture. Arid and semi-arid areas are at risk of desertification. Water is lost through evaporation due to outdated irrigation techniques used by the Southeastern Anatolia Project, increasing the risk of severe water shortage.

Damage to agriculture is predicted to greatly increase, for example due to "false spring" germination or blossoming followed by a cold snap. The increase in early blooming, which is happening due to climate change, can be a problem for crops such as fruit trees. Vineyards in Thrace are being affected.

A significant decline in agricultural production is transmitted throughout the economy and reduces national welfare. More agritech co-operation with the EU and UAE has been suggested.

==== Hydropower ====
Reduced precipitation and hydroelectricity in Turkey is forecast. Ember estimates that drought costs $1.8bn/year on average due to reduced hydro being replaced by gas. Turkish dams in the Tigris and Euphrates river basins are reducing cross-border flow and exacerbating drought due to climate change in Iraq.

==== Fisheries and aquaculture ====
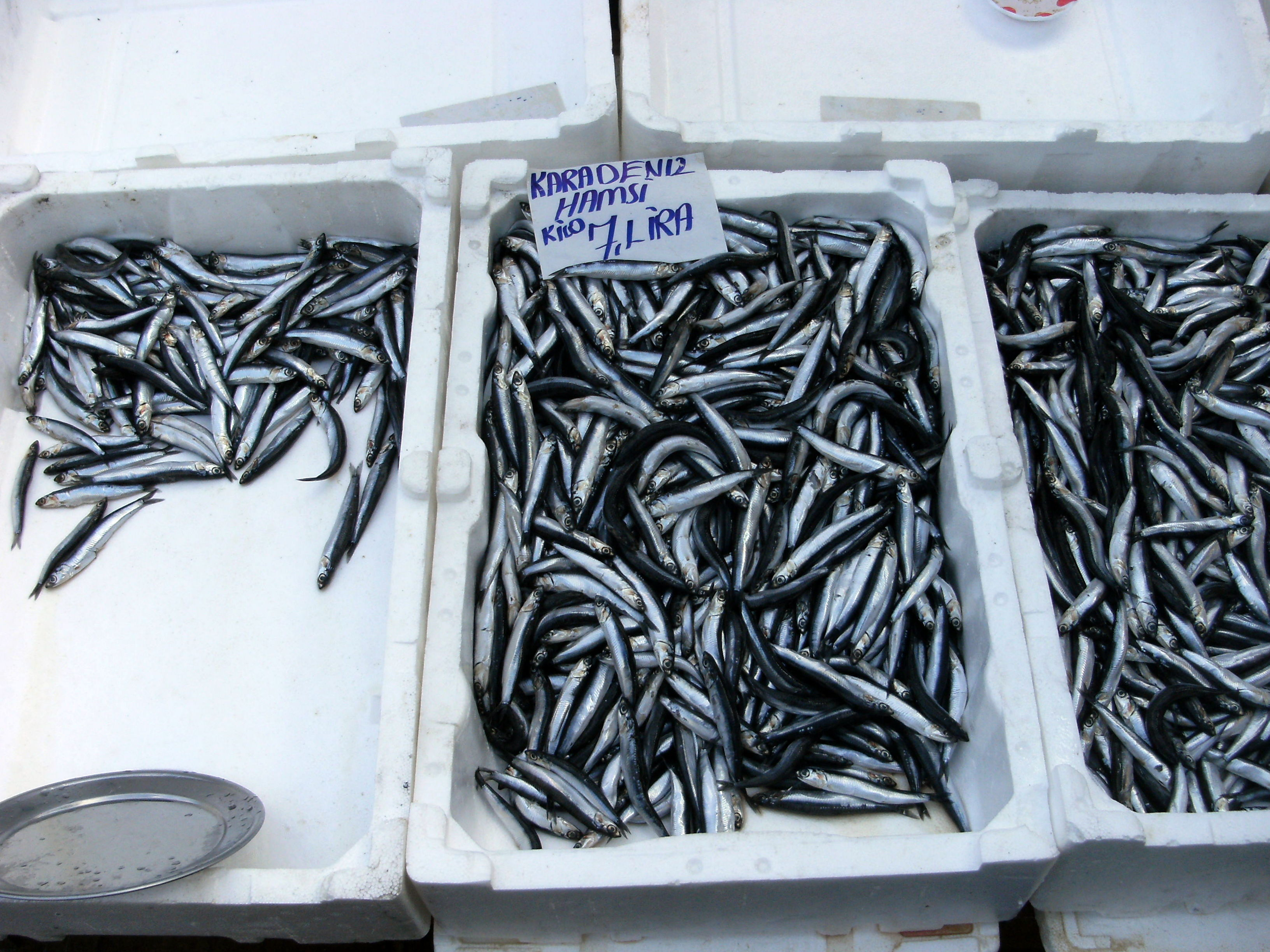
Anchovies may no longer grow properly in Turkish waters.

Warming seas and invasive marine species, such as from the Red Sea, have received little media coverage. Fishing in the Black Sea is sensitive to the impacts of climate change, and according to the Turkish Marine Research Foundation all Turkish seas will be affected. Lake Van is shrinking due to climate change.

==== Tourism ====
Tourism in Turkey may become too hot in the summer for some people, for example Antalya could become too hot for some visitors during some school holidays. Development of ski resorts in the Central Taurus and eastern Black Sea region mountains may not be possible.

=== Impacts on housing ===
New highways and building concrete are hindering absorption of floodwater by the land. Urban heat islands are also a problem. Because of the increase in temperature, existing buildings will need more energy for cooling.

== Mitigation ==
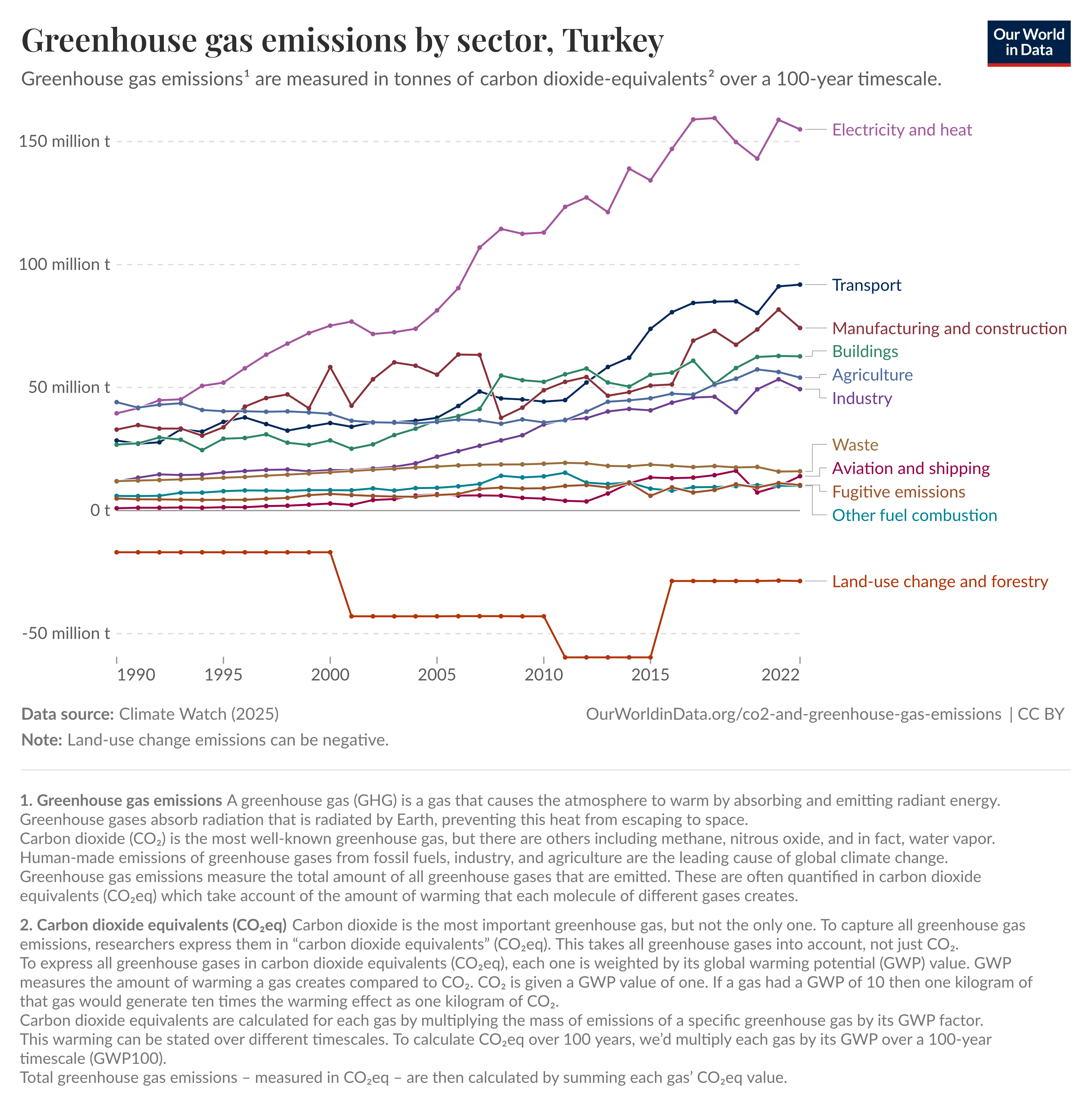

The Intergovernmental Panel on Climate Change (IPCC) defines mitigation (of climate change) as "a human intervention to reduce emissions or enhance the sinks of greenhouse gases".According to Climate Action Tracker Turkey's GHG emissions are not in line with the Paris Agreement objective to limit temperature rise to well below 2 °C.

A long-term climate strategy was published in 2024 but omits coal phase-out. The United Nations Environment Programme says a faster decarbonisation is needed, and emissions per person per year should be cut by more than half to about 2–2.5 t CO_{2}e by 2030.The government intended to complete its review of long-term (2030 to 2050) policy, (Note: In 2015, Turkey submitted its emissions target to the United Nations Framework Convention on Climate Change (UNFCCC), "up to 21 percent reduction in greenhouse gas (GhG) emissions from the Business as Usual level by 2030" and aiming to emit 929 Mt of CO_{2} (before subtracting CO_{2} absorbed by forests) in 2030. The country will probably meet this "unambitious" Intended Nationally Determined Contributions (INDC) which it submitted to the UNFCCC.) and publish a new National Climate Change Action Plan with sector specific targets and monitoring mechanisms by 2023, but as of 2025 the plan ends in 2030.

Unless Turkey's energy policy is changed, European Union (EU) emissions per person are forecast to fall below Turkey's during the 2020s. Since the EU is Turkey's main trading partner, a comparison with targets in the European Green Deal is important to help Turkish businesses avoid future EU carbon tariffs, on exports such as steel and cement. Public and private sector working groups discussed the European Green Deal, and the Trade Ministry published an action plan in response to its Carbon Border Adjustment Mechanism. A green taxonomy has been published, but criticized for including fossil gas, cement and blast furnaces.

Burning coal, petrol, diesel and natural gas is putting far more carbon dioxide into the air than forests can take out. There is some correlation with the economic history of Turkey, such as a dip during the 2001 economic crisis.

Greenhouse gas per person, before and after absorption by forests. The greater net dip in 2019 is because forest cover was resurveyed and found to be more than previously thought.

Turkey is aiming for net zero carbon emissions by 2053. The World Bank has estimated the cost and benefits, but has suggested government do far more detailed planning. The long-term climate change strategy published by the Ministry of Environment, Urbanisation and Climate Change in 2024 does not specifically mention coal, but says that the "infrastructure of existing fossil fuel-based facilities will be reviewed".

Thinktank Istanbul Policy Center doubts that the target of 643 million tonnes in 2035 is compatible with the 2053 net zero target, and several NGOs criticized the 2035 target as being set without consultation and an increase on 2023 emissions.

=== Energy ===
Emissions could be reduced considerably by switching from coal to existing gas-fired power stations: as there is enough generating capacity to allow the decommissioning of all coal-fired power stations and still meet peak energy demand, as long as hydropower as well as gas is used to meet peaks in demand. Solar and wind power are the cheapest generating technologies, but are underdeveloped. In 2026 Ember suggested that permitting should be improved for hybrid solar and for solar and wind with storage. The Istanbul Policy Center said in 2025 that coal power could be phased out by 2053, and that half of 2053 electricity generation could solar and a quarter wind.

Fossil fuel subsidies risk carbon lock-in, but if they were scrapped (as suggest by former environment minister Şimşek) wind and solar power could expand faster. A large amount of battery storage is in the pipeline, but relying simply on battery storage would be insufficient to decarbonize electricity, as periods of high and low demand last for two to three weeks. Ramping down nuclear power in Turkey will be technically possible, at times when solar or wind increases or electricity demand drops, but would be expensive because of high fixed costs and lost sales revenue. However, after upgrading, repowering and adding a small amount of pumped-storage hydroelectricity, there are enough hydropower dams in Turkey to provide dispatchable generation to balance variable renewable energy, even allowing for more frequent droughts in Turkey in the future because of climate change. Solar farms are being co-located with hydropower to maintain generation in case of drought. Turkey is in the top ten countries for geothermal energy. National and international investments in renewable energy and energy efficiency are being made; for example, the EBRD is supporting the installation of smart meters. Along with cement the electricity sector is forecast to be the hardest hit by the CBAM. There are subsidies for manufacturers of heat pumps and grid scale batteries.

=== Transport ===
In the 2000s transport emission intensity improved, but this gain was partially lost in the 2010s due to the growing preference for sport utility vehicles. Turkey has several manufacturers of electric buses and many are exported, few were in use in the country in 2021. A 2024 analysis said that government was prioritising vehicle production and exports over electric vehicle use. Ebikes are manufactured, but cities could be improved to make cycling in Turkey safer.

Although Turkey's ferries (unlike some other countries') are still fossil-fuelled, the world's first all-electric tugboat began working in Istanbul's harbour in 2020, and electric lorries are manufactured. Eti Mine Works produces small quantities of lithium carbonate locally, and plans to increase production for use in batteries. A battery factory is planned and Ford Otosan started making electric vans in 2022. Over a quarter of a million charging stations are planned by 2030. Building codes are being changed to mandate electric car charging points in new shopping centres and car parks.

As of 2024 2% of cars on the road are hybrid and 1% fully electric, but there are almost no commercial EVs. Chinese EVs are subject to a 50% import tariff. Turkey's automotive industry makes electric cars locally, which have incentives. However the special consumption tax^{(Turkish)} is 10% or more. As well as cutting GHG, creation of a domestic electric vehicle market by TOGG is hoped to reduce vehicle running costs, create jobs, and reduce oil imports. Introducing smart charging is important to avoid overloading Turkish electricity distribution networks.

Petrol and diesel taxes are lower than in the neighbouring EU but higher than in oil-producing countries to the south. Taxis could be better integrated with public transport. However Istanbul taxi regulations are politically deadlocked. The central government has drafted enabling regulations for low-emission zones, but as of 2025 no municipality has created one. According to Shura three-quarters of emissions in the transport sector come from road freight transport. Sales of fossil-fuelled road vehicles will be banned from 2040.

Using International Civil Aviation Organization methodology Turkish Airlines offers carbon offsets certified to Verified Carbon Standard and Gold Standard. Turkey is participating in the Carbon Offsetting and Reduction Scheme for International Aviation. Flights between Turkey and the EU may be charged in the EU ETS unless they avoid creating contrails. In 2024 the UNFCCC again asked Turkey to separate international from national aviation and shipping in its inventory.

=== Buildings ===
There are almost 10 million buildings in Turkey, and as they are the largest energy consumers there are substantial opportunities for energy savings in both new build and renovations. There is a roadmap, which says that as of 2021 three quarters of building stock is pre-21st century, that is pre energy standards. A typical residential building emits almost 50 kgCO2eq/m2/year, mostly due to the energy used by residents. The Organisation for Economic Co-operation and Development (OECD) has said that more could be done to improve the energy efficiency of buildings, and that tax incentives offered for this would create jobs. Turkey was a co-leader of the group discussing zero-carbon buildings at the 2019 UN Climate Action Summit, and the city of Eskişehir has pledged to convert all existing buildings to zero emissions by 2050. Such energy efficiency improvements can be made in the same programme as increasing resilience to earthquakes in Turkey. However, as of 2026 gas is subsidized. Increasing the proportion of passive houses has been suggested, as has adopting some EU building standards. Thinktank Ember said in 2023 that rooftop solar should be mandatory on new buildings, and say that installation on apartment block roofs is hindered by bureaucracy. To improve the energy efficiency of buildings it has been suggested that green building principles and technologies should be applied.

Istanbul Policy Center estimate that most of the additional cost of net zero is for buildings. Although low-energy houses, zero-energy buildings and zero carbon housing will be encouraged, the 2024 long-term plan said that "The existing natural gas transmission and distribution infrastructure will be strengthened, and natural gas access will be provided in areas where renewable sources and waste heat-based district heating/cooling systems are not technically or economically feasible." In rural areas without a piped gas supply, heat pumps could be an alternative to wood, coal and bottled gas: but buying a heat pump is rare as it is very expensive for householders as there is no subsidy. As well as more insulation help for poor rural people, subsidies for communal heat pumps and solar panels have been suggested for any villages where they would be technically suitable. Owners of larger properties such as shopping centres, schools and government buildings have shown more interest in heat pumps. Direct geothermal heating (not to be confused with heat pumps) installed capacity totaled 3.5 GW thermal (GWt) in 2020, with the potential for 60 GWt.

There is no data on the carbon intensity of cement. Emissions from cement production could be lessened by reducing its clinker content—for example, by making Limestone Calcined Clay Cement, which is only half clinker. The second-largest reduction could be made by switching half the fuel from hard coal and petroleum coke (petcoke) to a mixture of rubber from waste tires, refuse-derived fuel and biomass. Although the country has enough of these materials, most cement kilns (there are 54) use coal, petcoke or lignite as their primary energy source. More cross-laminated timber could be used for building, instead of concrete. Further decarbonisation of cement production would depend heavily on carbon capture, perhaps storing in a salt dome near Lake Tuz or in Diyarbakır Province.

=== Industry, agriculture and fishing ===
Restriction of hydrofluorocarbons (HFC) under the Kigali Amendment to the Montreal Protocol, which limits emissions of fluorinated gases, began in 2024 aiming for 10% reduction by 2029 and 80% by 2045. However as of 2026, HFC smuggling from China to the EU via Turkey remains a problem. Electric motors in small and medium-sized enterprises are becoming more efficient. Low-carbon hydrogen and ammonia could help with hard to decarbonize industries; such as fertilizer and petrochemicals. As of 2021 there are almost no supporters of the Task Force on Climate-Related Financial Disclosures, to provide information to investors about the risks of climate change to companies. Some manufacturers which export to the EU are adding their own solar power to reduce emissions, and the Turkish Industry and Business Association has asked the EU for funding to help strengthen alignment with the CBAM.

Climate-smart agriculture is being studied and financed, and agrivoltaics has been suggested as suitable for maize and some other shade-loving vegetables. The Istanbul Policy Center suggests electrification of agricultural machinery, no-till farming, improving animal feed to reduce enteric fermentation, capturing biomass from manure, reducing fertilizer use, and growing more legumes. Most marine protected areas are “Special Environmental Protection Areas”, of which 13 are marine as of 2025.

=== Carbon sinks ===
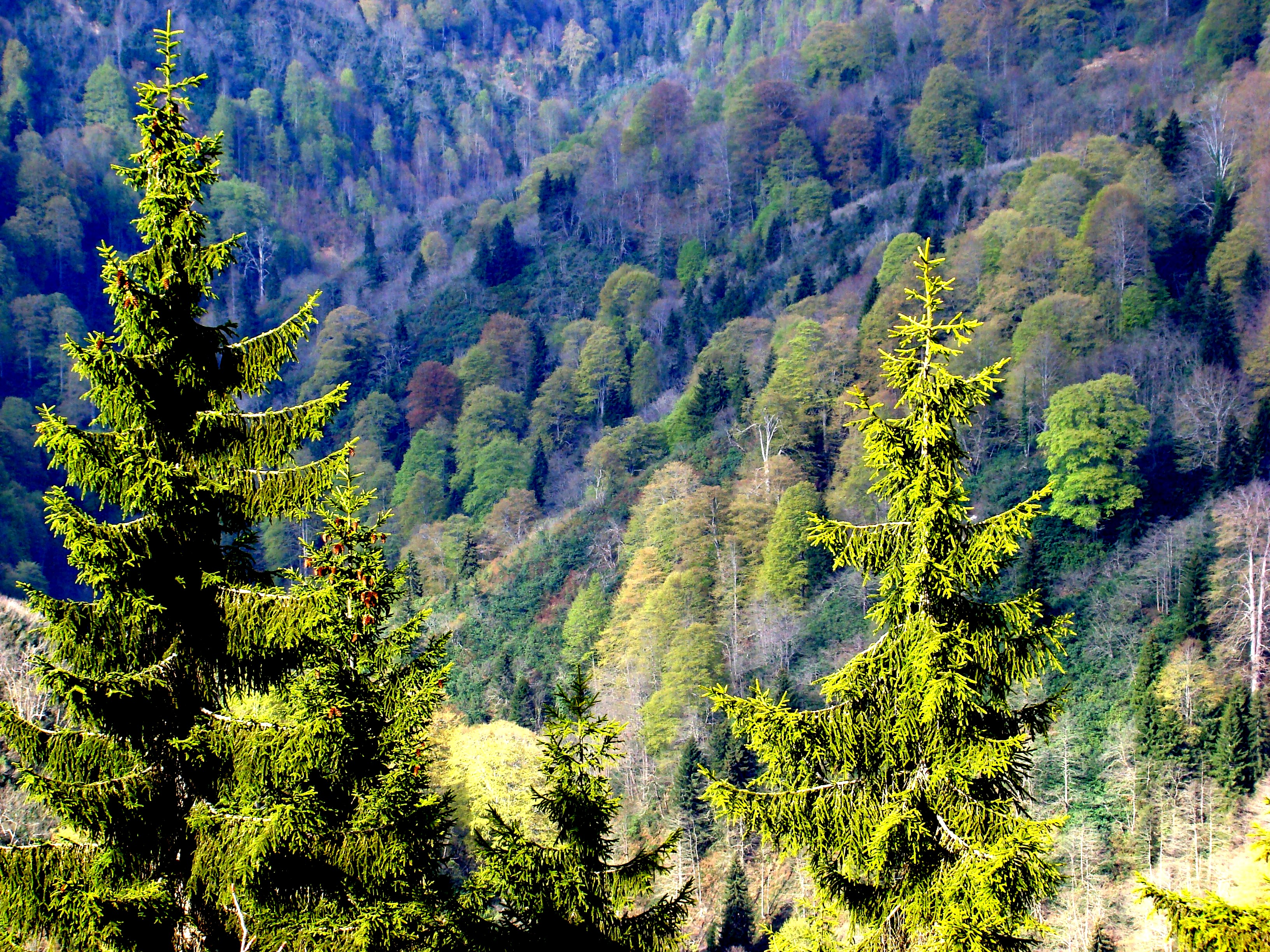
These existing trees are being added to by reforestation.

Turkey has 23 million hectares of forest covering quarter of the country, though over 40% is degraded woodland. Turkey's forests are its main carbon sink and offset 55 Mt of the country's emissions in 2024. The government said in 2015 that by 2050 "forests are envisioned to stretch across over four-fifths of the country's territory". However warmer and drier air in the south and west may make it difficult to sustain the present forest cover. Due to forest fires and reduced productivity due to climate change trees are becoming less of a sink but, despite regional variations, forests are expected to remain an overall carbon sink. Almost all Turkey's forest land belongs to the state and cannot be privatized. Private afforestation permits have been issued however, to encourage tree planting in areas where tree density is low. Civil society organizations, such as the Turkish Foundation for Combating Soil Erosion and the Foresters' Association of Turkey, are also encouraging reforestation. In 2019, an annual "National Forestation Day" every 11 November was established by President Erdoğan. Junipers have been suggested for reforestation because of their hardiness, but are said to need help to regrow quickly. But, according to Ege University associate professor Serdar Gökhan Senol, the Ministry of Agriculture and Forestry sometimes replants when it should wait for regrowth instead. In 2024 about 14 Mt was locked up in wood products. Wildfires emit carbon dioxide such as 10 Mt in 2021.

Soil in Turkey contains soil organic carbon, which is estimated to total 3.5 billion tonnes at 30 centimetres (12 in) soil depth, with 36 t/ha in agricultural fields. Soil organic carbon has been mapped: this is important because carbon emissions from soil are directly related to climate change, but vary according to soil interaction with low levels of soil organic carbon increasing the risk of soil erosion. Turkey is a major producer of marble; it has been suggested that waste from the industry could capture carbon (such as from cement production) by calcium looping.

=== Economics ===
Recent economic growth emits less carbon dioxide

During the late 20th and early 21st centuries, growth of the Turkish economy, and to a lesser extent population, caused increased emissions from electricity generation, industry and construction, as described by the environmental Kuznets curve hypothesis. And from the 1990s to the 2010s they were correlated with electricity generation. But during the 2010s economic growth and the increase in emissions decoupled somewhat. Since the 1970s the energy intensity of economic growth has fluctuated around 1 kWh per 2011 USD, whereas the carbon intensity of energy has fallen from 300g per kWh to 200g per kWh. Carbon Tracker says that it is possible to decouple economic growth and emissions, by expanding the country's renewable-energy capacity and investing in energy efficiency with a sustainable energy policy.

On average the consumption-based CO_{2} emissions of one of the richest 10% of people in Turkey is more than double that of someone in the rest of the population, as richer people tend to fly more. Turkey's high income inequality may cause higher CO_{2} emissions.

The long-term strategy says that public procurement will prioritize low-carbon products and services. Turkey has received climate finance from the Global Environment Facility, the Clean Technology Fund, and various bilateral funding, but is not eligible for the Green Climate Fund because of its status as a developed country under the UNFCCC.

Worldwide, marginal abatement cost studies show that improving the energy efficiency of buildings and replacing fossil fuelled power plants with renewables are usually the most cost-effective ways of reducing carbon emissions. A 2020 study said that the electricity sector is key, and that low cost abatement is possible in the building sector. The same study said that low levels of abatement in agriculture would be cheap, but high levels very expensive. A 2021 study by Shura said that energy transition could increase national income by more than 1%, the largest part being wage increases due to higher skilled jobs, such as in wind and solar power. According to the study socioeconomic benefits, such as better health and wages, would be three times the financial cost.

Turkey's carbon emissions are costly, even without carbon tariffs from other countries. The short-term health co-benefits of climate change mitigation have been estimated at $800 million for Turkey in the year 2028 alone. Investment in green energy is far smaller than the country's potential. Academics have estimated that if Turkey and other countries invested in accordance with the Paris Agreement, Turkey would break even around 2060. A 2023 IMF working paper says that carbon pricing can be designed to support poor people.

==== Fossil fuel subsidies ====
According to the OECD, fossil fuel subsidies in 2019 totalled over 25 billion lira (US$4.4 billion), nearly 1% of GDP. Economics professor Ebru Voyvoda has criticized growth policies based on the construction and real estate sectors, and said that moving from fossil fuels to electricity is important. According to a 2020 report by the International Institute for Sustainable Development: "Turkey also lacks transparency and continues to provide support for coal production and fossil fuel use, predominantly by foregoing tax revenue and providing state-owned enterprise investment." A MWh of electricity from Turkish lignite emits over a tonne of CO_{2}. Some electricity from these power stations is purchased by the state electricity company at a guaranteed price of US$50–55/MWh until the end of 2027, despite coal power subsidies being economically irrational. Coal miners' wages are subsidised.

The Petroleum Market Law provides incentives for investors to explore for oil and produce it. According to the OECD, in 2019 the fuel tax exemption for naphtha, petroleum coke and petroleum bitumen was a subsidy of 6.7 billion lira (US$1.2 billion), the largest of Turkey's fossil fuel subsidies that year. Petcoke is used in cement production. In other countries fossil fuel subsidies have been successfully scrapped by good communication from government, immediate cash transfers to poor people, energy price smoothing and energy transition support for households and firms.

==== Carbon pricing ====
The Turkish Emissions Trading System is the carbon emission trading system expected to cover almost half of greenhouse gas emissions by Turkey, with a 50 thousand tCO₂e/year threshold. Reporting started in 2026, with a free pilot phase including industries such as cement. Exporters have to pay the EU Carbon Border Adjustment Mechanism from 2026 until the Turkish ETS starts charging. The implementation phase is due to run from 2027 to 2034. A law was passed in 2025 but allowances have not yet been decided, and it has not yet clear whether the country will join the Cooperative Mechanisms under Article 6 of the Paris Agreement. In 2026 Carbon Market Watch criticised the free allocations, the lack of transparency and the lack of guaranteed absolute emissions reductions. Furthermore, legal scholars have warned that implementing domestic carbon pricing and regulating fossil fuels could expose Turkey to investor-state dispute settlement (ISDS) claims under its older bilateral investment treaties and the Energy Charter Treaty, prompting experts to suggest that the balance between climate regulation and investor protection is increasingly being managed through domestic legislation and individual contracts rather than international treaty amendments.

== Politics ==
Chart showing results of the Peoples' Climate Vote 2024 survey, regarding support for a quick transition away from fossil fuels

Article 56 of the Turkish Constitution states:

Everyone has the right to live in a healthy and balanced environment. It is the duty of the State and citizens to improve the natural environment, to protect the environmental health and to prevent environmental pollution.

A similar clause in the constitution of the US state of Montana has been used to declare laws that support fossil fuels unconstitutional.

=== 2000s ===
The Justice and Development Party (AK Party), led by Recep Tayyip Erdoğan, was elected to government in 2003 and has been in power almost continuously since then. Turkey ratified the UNFCCC in 2004, but said it was unfair that it was included amongst the Annex I (developed) countries. When the treaty was signed in 1992 Turkey had much lower emissions per person, and no historical responsibility for greenhouse gas emissions. So, the Foreign Ministry argue that Turkey should have been grouped with non-Annex developing countries, which can receive climate finance from the Green Climate Fund. Turkey ratified the Kyoto Protocol in 2009.

=== 2010s ===
In a 2011 dispute over air pollution in Turkey, the main opposition Republican People's Party criticized the government for prioritising fossil fuels. The Climate Change and Air Management Coordination Board (Turkish: İklim Değişikliği ve Hava Yönetimi Koordinasyon Kurulu) was a government agency of the Republic of Turkey, responsible for coordinating policy against air pollution in Turkey and climate change in Turkey; board meetings were chaired by the Minister of Environment and Urban Planning. The Climate Change and Air Management Coordination Board was created to coordinate government departments, and included three business organisations. The Environment Ministry chaired it, though other ministries have considerable influence over climate change policy. The Energy Ministry has an Environment and Climate Department (responsible for the GHG inventory) and the Ministry of Treasury and Finance leads on climate financing. Despite the Energy Ministry being represented on the board, in 2018 the European Commission criticized the lack of co-ordination between the climate change policy and energy policy of Turkey. Energy policy included mining more coal and subsidizing coal-fired power stations. The board's decisions were not binding.

In 2018 a report outlining carbon market policy options for Turkey was submitted to the board.

Turkey signed the Paris Agreement in 2016 but did not ratify it. In 2015 Turkey declared its intention to achieve "up to a 21% reduction in GHG emissions from the Business as Usual level by 2030". But because "Business as Usual" was assumed to be such a large increase, the "21% reduction" would have been an increase of over 7% per year to around double the 2020 level.

In 2019, Ümit Şahin, who teaches climate change at Sabancı University, said that Turkey saw industrialized Western countries as solely responsible. While discussing their limited actions on climate change, Turkey and other countries cited the forthcoming United States withdrawal from the Paris Agreement. Turkey was the 16th largest emitting country in 2019. (Note: Overtaken by Greenhouse gas emissions by Australia)

During the 2019 UN Climate Action Summit on achieving carbon neutrality by 2050, Turkey co-led the coalition on the decarbonization of land transport. As of 2019, the government aimed to keep the share of coal in the energy portfolio at around the same level in the medium and long term. This was explained, in part, because of Turkey's desire to have a diverse mix of energy sources. Rather than increase imports of gas, it wanted to retain domestic coal, albeit with safeguards to reduce the impact on human health and the environment. İklim Haber (Climate News) and KONDA Research and Consultancy found in 2018 that public opinion on climate change prefers solar and wind power.

=== 2020s ===
==== Local politics and a just transition ====
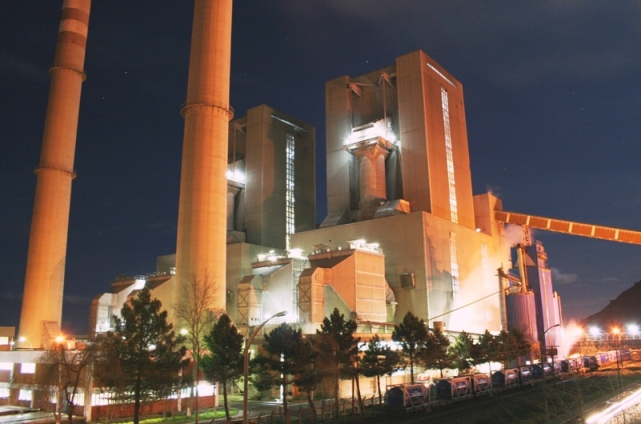
Çatalağzı power station in Zonguldak: Turkey's first coal mining region would need help to give up.

Each province will prepare a climate action plan to start in 2028. Although the transition to clean energy increases employment in Turkey as a whole, for example in wind and solar power and energy efficiency of buildings, lost jobs may be concentrated in certain locations and sectors. For example, closing Şırnak Silopi power station and the coal mines in Şırnak Province could increase already high unemployment there. Because carbon pricing would be somewhat regressive economists say that poor people should be compensated. In 2024 the government said it will make a national policy for a just transition; policy to quit high-carbon, such as coal, is lacking. Similarly, it is hard for livestock farmers to make a profit, so a sudden removal of subsidies would be an economic shock. But, unlike in neighbouring Greece, there have been no public debates about a just transition.

According to former Economy Minister Kemal Derviş, many people will benefit from the green transition, but the losses will be concentrated on specific groups, making them more visible and politically disruptive.At the municipal level, Antalya, Bornova, Bursa, Çankaya, Eskişehir Tepebaşı, Gaziantep, İzmir, Kadıköy, Maltepe, Nilüfer and Seferihisar have sustainable energy and climate plans. A 2021 academic study of local climate change politics said that "local climate action planning takes place independent from the national efforts yet with a commitment to international agreements" and that better co-ordination between local and national government would help planning for climate change adaptation. Turkey ratified the Paris Agreement in 2021: according to Politico the country was persuaded by a 3.2 billion dollar loan from France and Germany for its energy transition, and Turkey's chief negotiator said the threat of the EU CBAM was a factor.

==== National Politics ====
Turkish citizens took individual and political action on climate change to the streets and online, including children demanding action and petitioning the UN. Turkey's Green Party called for an end to coal burning and the phasing out of all fossil-fuel use by 2050.

After the 2020/21 droughts, the Nationalist Movement Party (the smaller party in the governing coalition) said that climate change is a national security issue. The threat of climate change had already been securitized by Environment Minister Murat Kurum back in 2019. Also following on from the droughts, a Parliamentary Research Commission wrote a report.

The national energy plan published in 2022 expected 1.7 GW more coal power to be built, but the opposition CHP had already said that no more fossil fuel power plants should be built and that there should be carbon trading. Businesses say the country needs to decarbonize so that money which would otherwise be lost to the CBAM remains in the country: NGOs and academics have such plans, however a February 2022 government-led "Climate Council" of all those groups and others issued over 200 recommendations, but not one for coal phase out. European Climate Action Network Turkey complained that civil society is not properly represented in decision making and in particular that there were no organizations such as theirs in the " Emission Reduction Commission" of the Climate Council.

The government says that "Türkiye’s approach to tackling climate change is based on reducing greenhouse gas emissions and adapting to the impacts of climate change; these two policy areas are pursued simultaneously and within a holistic framework."

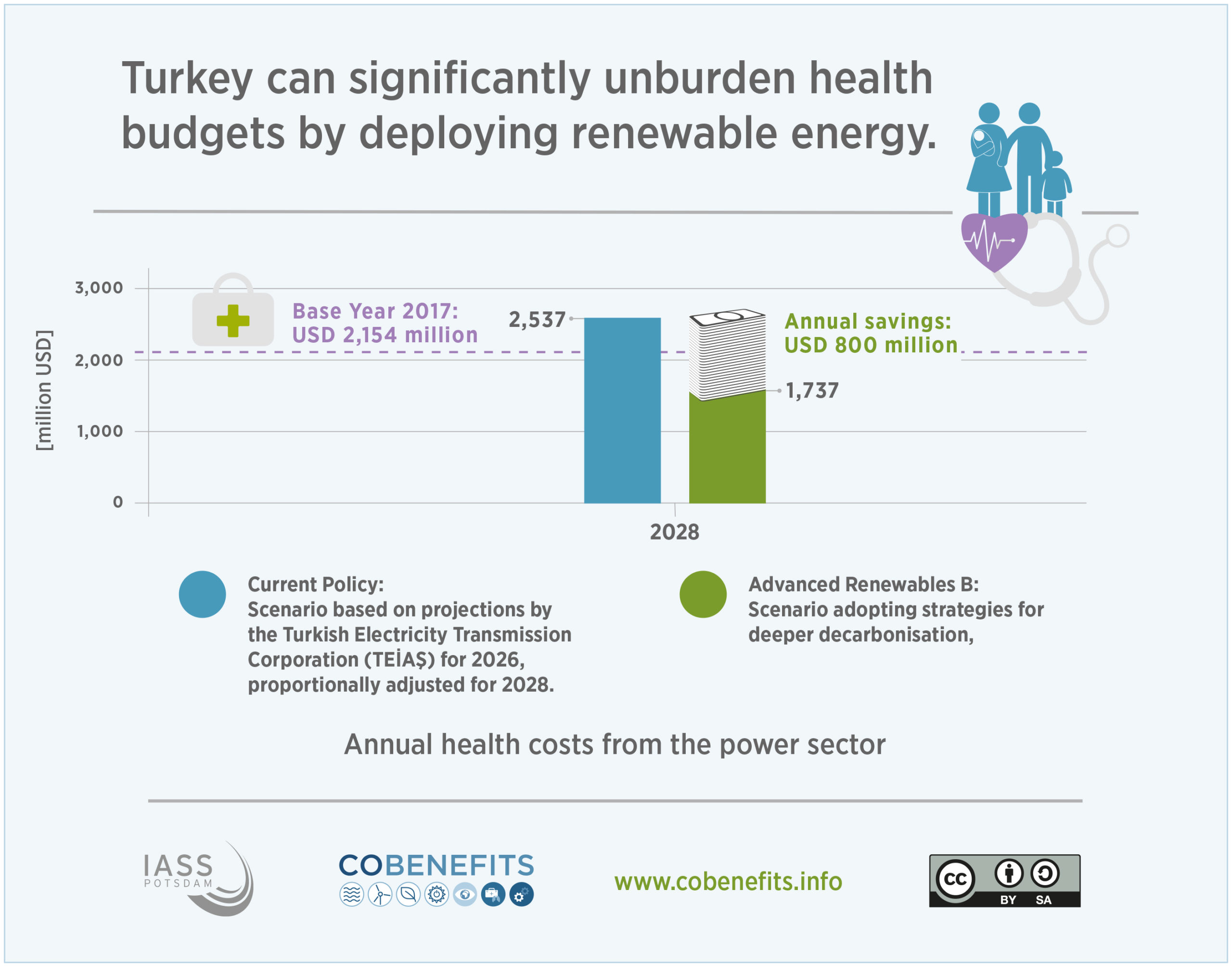
Renewable energy reduces health costs in Turkey

As of 2019 the Health Ministry is not actively involved in the permitting of industrial facilities, such as coal-fired power stations, which cause deaths due to air pollution.

Although the Health and Agriculture Ministries coordinate with each other, there is no formal agreement between Health and Energy or Transport as of 2022.

The board was replaced with the Climate Change and Adaptation Coordination Board (CCAMC) for a short time, and a Climate Change Presidency was created, (also translated as “Directorate of Climate Change”).

==== International politics ====
Turkey and some other member countries say the Energy Charter Treaty should be changed to help with decarbonization, but because changes must be unanimous this is unlikely to happen. Turkish Petroleum Corporation (TPAO) is in discussions with private-sector companies about investment in Black Sea fossil gas. China funded Emba Hunutlu coal-fired power station started up in 2022.

The government says that, as a developing country having less than 1% responsibility for historical greenhouse gas emissions, Turkey's position under the UNFCCC and Paris Agreement is not fair at all. However some academics say that low historical greenhouse gas emissions can only be used as a fairness justification under international environmental law by least developed countries and small island developing states. They say that almost all G20 countries, including Turkey, should reduce their emissions below the 2010 level. Nevertheless, the same academics say that countries with higher historical emissions should reduce emissions more.

Environmental lawyers became more active in the 2020s. The Paris Agreement was ratified by parliament shortly before the 2021 United Nations Climate Change Conference.

Hakan Mining and Generation Industry & Trade Inc. constructed Gisagara peat-fired power station in Rwanda, which was delayed by climate change, but started supplying the grid in 2021.

Academics doubt that emissions could be reduced from a 2038 peak to zero by 2053, and say that delaying Turkey's energy transition is more expensive than starting it at once. The 2053 target was reportedly set without consulting the Energy Ministry, and as of 2023 that ministry has not published a decarbonization roadmap. Before Turkey hosted the 2026 United Nations Climate Change Conference, President Erdoğan said ".... Türkiye prioritises green industrialisation and the transition to clean energy, strengthens its efforts to reduce greenhouse gas and methane emissions, and makes our cities more resilient to the impacts of climate change." The climate diplomacy book published before the conference has 2 pages on Turkey's energy transition, but they do not mention coal, oil or natural gas. However later it says that the EU CBAM increasingly links market access to the carbon content of Turkey's exports.

== Adaptation ==
The Ministry of Environment, Urbanisation and Climate Change coordinates activities to combat climate change in Turkey. The Twelfth Development Plan (2024–2028) mentions adaptation. A national strategy and action plan for 2024 to 2030 adaptation to climate change has been published, but as of 2026 Turkey has yet to submit a National Adaptation Plan to the UNFCCC.

Agriculture Minister Bekir Pakdemirli said in 2023 that irrigation was being modernized and that thirsty crops, such as corn, were being swapped out of agriculture in Turkey. Water-conserving landscaping of green spaces in cities has been suggested, and Istanbul has a climate change action plan. A 2023 study suggested that local climate change plans should be better integrated with local spatial plans. The World Bank is funding flood control infrastructure.

== Society and culture ==
=== Education, research and access to information ===
Climate change education is an option in 6th, 7th and 8th grades of education in Turkey. As of 2025 there is not much teacher training or school materials, however there is higher education and research at Boğaziçi University's Center for Climate Change and Policy Studies. In 2025 results will be measured by the Programme for International Student Assessment. The government said in 2026 that it is "Integrating Türkiye’s net-zero emissions target into every level of the education system". İklim Masası (Climate Desk) is a news platform with experts writing for the public and as a reference for journalists.

Sabancı University's Shura Energy Transition Center is researching decarbonization pathways. Linear regression, expert judgement and local integrated assessment modelling is used for non-energy projections. Emissions from industry have been modelled by the Energy Ministry and the Scientific and Technological Research Council of Turkey using TIMES-MACRO. A "Climate Change Platform" is planned to share studies and data.Although the OECD praised the government's monitoring, reporting and verification (MRV) system and said in 2021 that it covers half of total emissions, unlike the public sharing of data in the EU emission trading system, much detailed emissions data in Turkey is not public. However in 2025 Hayrettin Kurt, Chairman of the Audit Committee at the World Energy Council Turkish National Committee, said that facility level data from the Turkish Emissions Trading System will be disclosed to the public. Quantitative estimates of the impact of individual government policies on emissions have not been made or are not publicly available; neither are projections of long-term policy impacts. An expert review of Turkey's GHG report published in 2023 noted that over 50 recommendations made in previous expert reviews had not yet been addressed. Space-based measurements of the signs of emissions has allowed public monitoring of the megacity of Istanbul and high emitting power plants since the early-2020s.

=== Activism ===
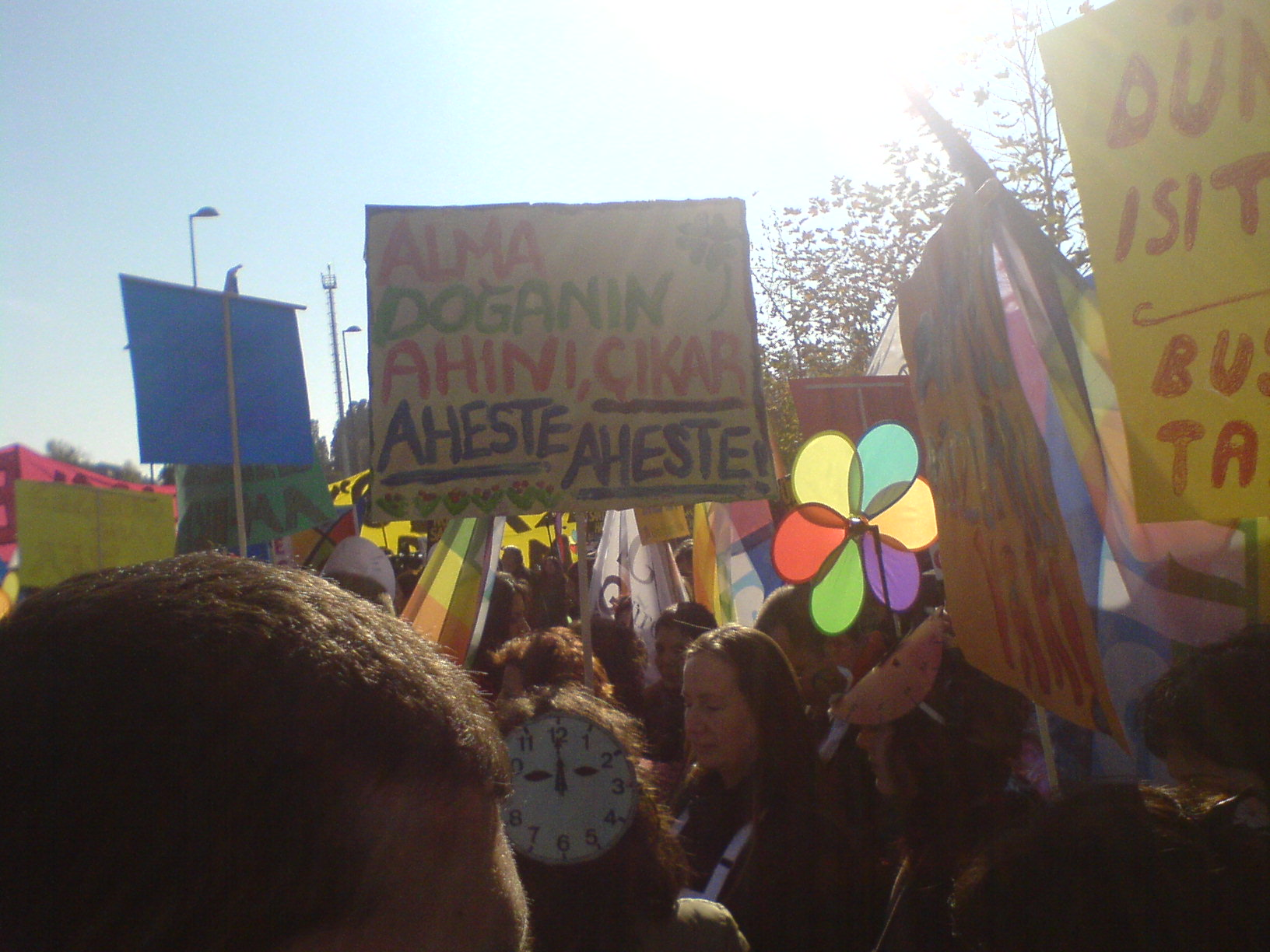
A 2007 climate change protest in Istanbul.

Climate Network Türkiye is a coalition of civil society organisations.

Muslim environmentalists and academics quote the Quran in support of their environmentalism. In Istanbul in 2015, Islamic leaders urged the world's 1.6 billion Muslims to help defeat climate change.

In 2026 first lady Emine Erdoğan called for reducing excessive consumption and waste. In 2019 some Turkish schoolchildren joined the School Strike for Climate.

==== Lawsuits ====
Article 56 of the Constitution of Turkey says that, "Everyone has the right to live in a healthy and balanced environment. It is the duty of the State and citizens to improve the natural environment, to protect the environmental health and to prevent environmental pollution." Turkey has ratified the Paris Agreement and says that its greenhouse gas emissions will be net zero by 2053, but the government has no plan to phase out coal. Several cases have been filed, some of which are ongoing.

In 2023 young climate activists opened a case alleging that the nationally determined contribution (NDC) was inadequate. The three youth climate activists filed a lawsuit against President Erdoğan and the Ministry of Environment, Urbanisation and Climate Change because Turkey's Nationally Determined Contribution is not to reduce its greenhouse gas emissions. They alleged that there is no effective climate action plan for energy. They alleged that these violate their human rights stated in the constitution, such as the environmental clause in the constitution. The Council of State rejected the case on the grounds that it was an ‘annulment of an administrative action’ case but the NDC is not an administrative action. As of 2026 the case is at the Constitutional Court.

In 2022 and 2023 cases were brought about Lake Marmara drying up. In 2024 a court decided to pause the process of reclassifying the land as not wetland, on the grounds that it could be rewetted: Doğa are calling for the court to annul the reclassification.

==== Media and arts ====
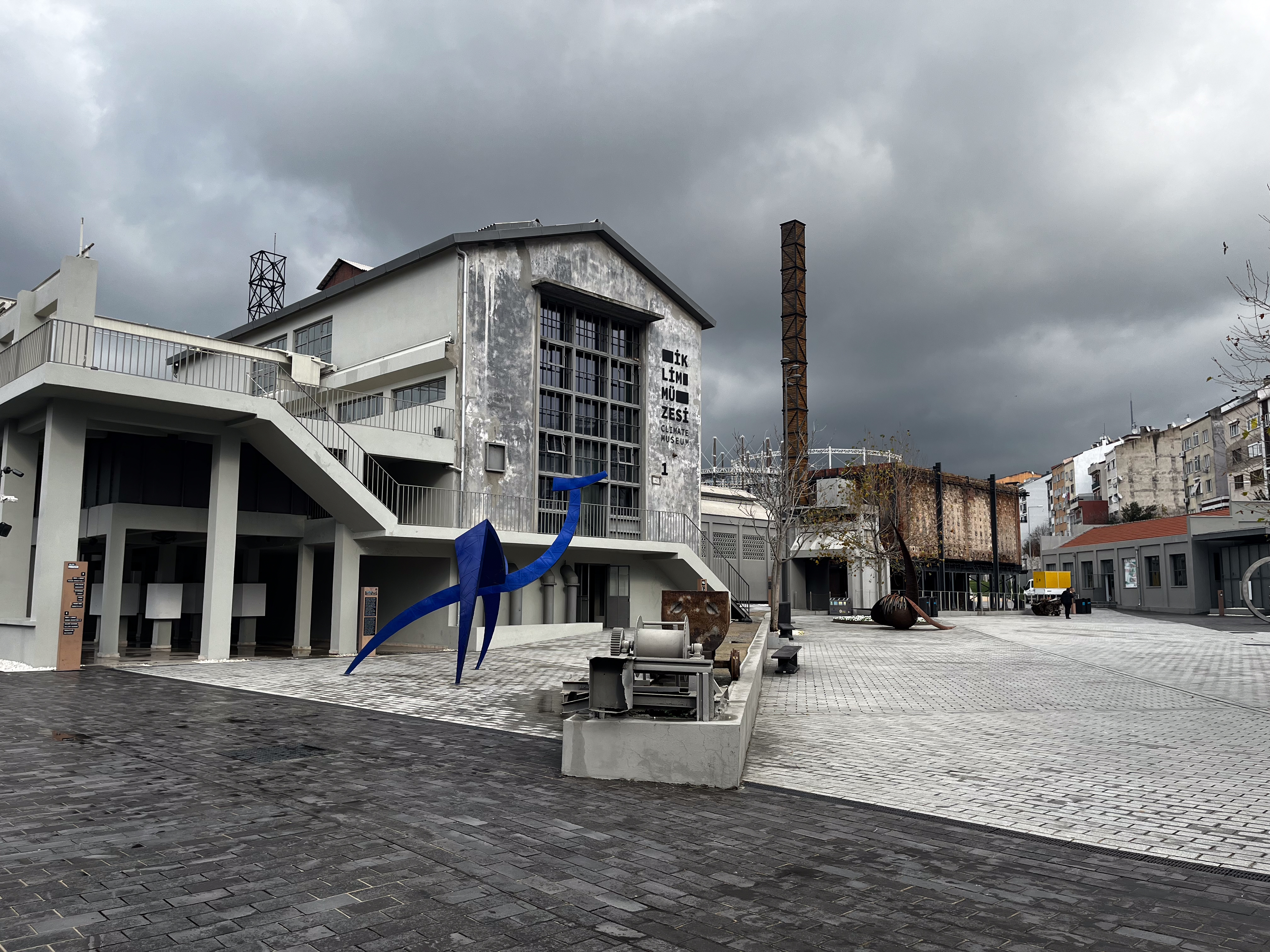
Müze Gazhane in Kadıköy is the first climate change museum in Turkey.

In the 1990s independent Açık Radyo (Open Radio) broadcast some of the first media coverage of climate change, and its founder Ömer Madra (in Turkish) emphasizes "The three Y's in the fight on climate change: Yerel (local) Yatay (horizontal) and Yavaş (slow, no resort to violence)." The station continues, and İklim Haber (Climate News) also covers climate change issues in Turkish and English. The climate impact of coal power is rarely discussed, and nearly all Turkish media owners have financial interests in fossil fuels. The media covers climate change only during extreme weather events, with insufficient expert opinions or civil-society perspectives. Some think tanks, such as Ember, are respected by both industry and environmentalists. Ufuk Alparslan, Ember's regional lead, says that readers are enthused by solar power increasing energy independence and reducing import costs, but are not much interested in the climate benefits. The arts are raising awareness of climate change (although some are sponsored by companies whose environmental policies have been criticized), and education is supported by the EU. Protests against opencast coal mining, such as at Akbelen Forest, have been covered by small media outlets such as Yeşil Gazete and Kaldıraç Magazine.

=== Public perception ===
2023 Survey - I expect to be displaced by climate change - Ipsos

Individual action on climate change is not properly understood (in a survey of primary school teachers many erroneously prioritized using less cosmetics) and neither are government choices on climate change mitigation (in the same survey only a minority correctly prioritized curbing fossil fuel use). Future warming of seawater by Akkuyu Nuclear Power Plant is wrongly thought by some to be relevant to climate change.

İklim Haber (Climate News) and KONDA Research and Consultancy found in 2018 that over three-quarters of public opinion on climate change thinks that extreme weather has increased. Over 70% of the public acknowledge that current climate crisis is a result of human activities. Some construction companies have been accused of greenwashing, advertising their buildings as environmentally friendly without obtaining any green building certificates.

In a 2019 E3G poll of six Belt and Road Initiative countries (including Turkey), solar was the most popular energy source and coal the least popular. Twenty-four Turkish cities committed to the Paris Agreement targets that year, and the United Nations Development Programme partnered with the Turkish Basketball Federation in 2020 to raise public awareness of the fight against climate change. A 2020 study found that the level of public support for a potential carbon tax does not depend on whether the proceeds are used for mitigation and adaptation. In 2023 a draft law was proposed including public information and adding climate change to education in Turkey. In 2024 a climate portal was created and Turkish citizens can log in to it. Similar to global public opinion most Turks favour climate action.

=== International cooperation ===
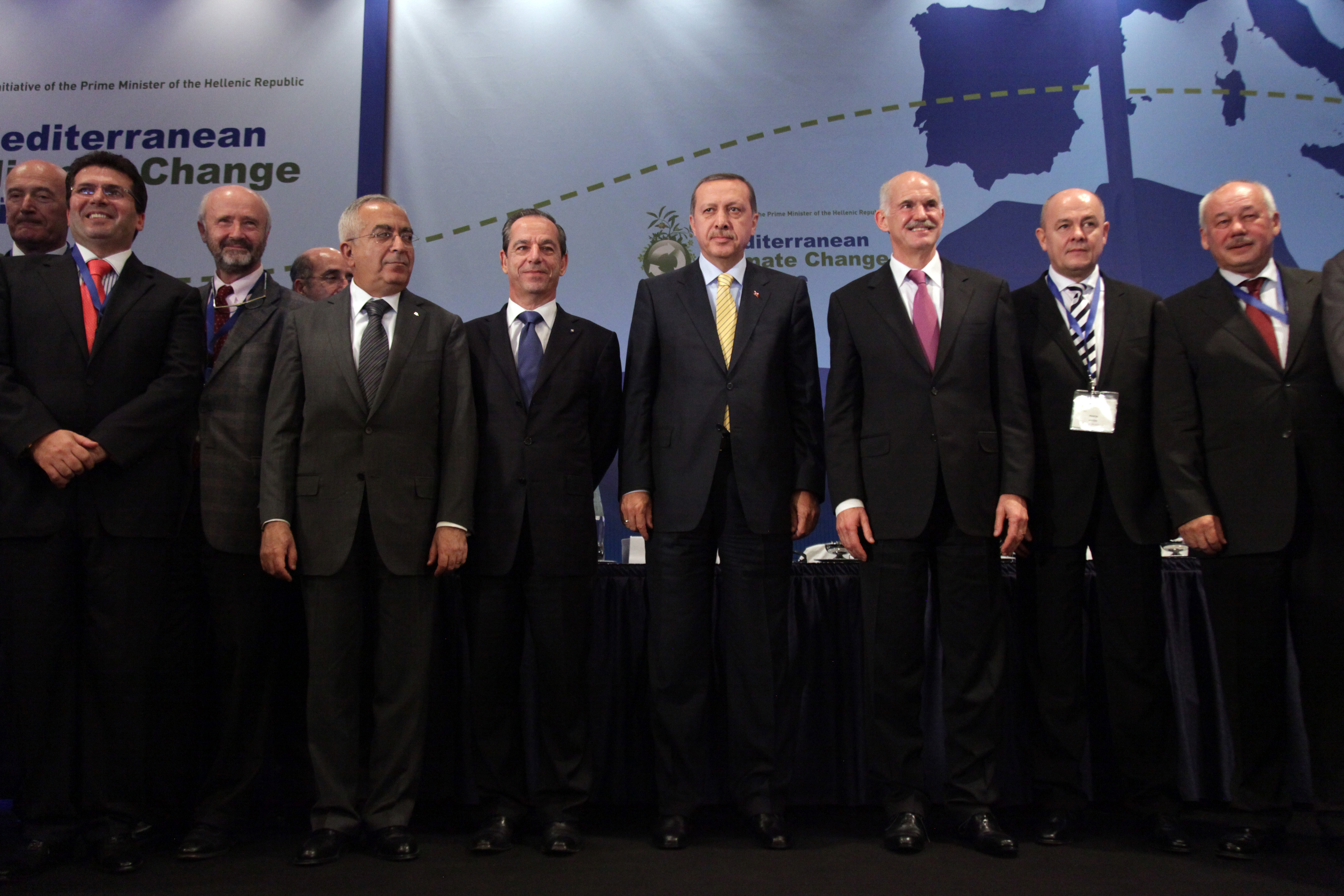
Turkish President Recep Tayyip Erdoğan with other country leaders at a meeting of the Mediterranean Climate Change Initiative in 2010.

According to the Ministry of Energy and Natural Resources, climate change is one of the world's biggest problems. Turkey was the fifth-largest recipient of multilateral climate funds between 2013 and 2016, receiving $231 million through channels such as the Clean Technology Fund (CTF) and the Global Environment Facility (GEF).

In 2021, Turkey ratified the Paris Agreement, with all parliamentary members voting to ratıfy. Prior to this, it was one of the last few remaining countries, alongside neighboring country Iran, to not have ratified the agreement. It was the last of the G20 countries to ratify. Their reason for delay, according to the current presidency at the G20 summit in 2020, was the countries "negligible historical responsibility for greenhouse gas emissions (less than 1%)". Turkey is not party to the Convention on Environmental Impact Assessment in a Transboundary Context (Espoo Convention). In 2021 Turkey ratified the Kigali Amendment to reduce production and use of hydrofluorocarbons. Armenia says that dam construction in Turkey has combined with climate change to reduce flow in the Araks River basin. Turkey will host the 2026 United Nations Climate Change Conference.

Turkey sent over a thousand representatives to the 2023 United Nations Climate Change Conference and joined various initiatives, such as decarbonizing cement production. However it was criticized for not voting to phase-out fossil fuels, with Umit Şahin at Sabancı University Istanbul Policy Center saying that would be good for the economy as Turkey is a fossil fuel importer.

The 2026 United Nations Climate Change Conference or Conference of the Parties to the UNFCCC, more commonly known as COP31, is being held at the Expo Center in Antalya, Turkey, from 9 to 20 November 2026. It is the 31st session of the United Nations Climate Change Conference, part of the United Nations Framework Convention on Climate Change (UNFCCC).

== See also ==
- Turkish State Meteorological Service
- Climate change in Cyprus
- Climate change in Europe
- Climate change in Asia
- Climate change in the Middle East and North Africa
