= Soil in Turkey =

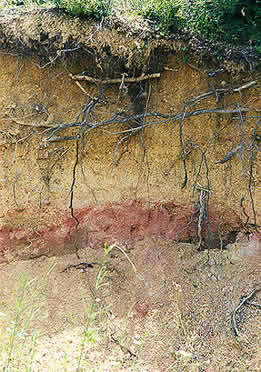
Soil profile with oxidation in Manisa Province, Turkey

The main types of soil in Turkey are calcisols, cambisols and leptosols, and fluvisols. The government says that "Soil is an indispensable form of natural capital for food security, sustainable water resources, biodiversity conservation, carbon storage and adaptation to climate change."

By the mid-20th century erosion had reduced the amount of arable land, but the government is combating desertification and erosion in various ways. However, soil erosion continues in the 21st century and is forecast to increase with climate change, with about 30% occurring on agricultural land. Degraded soil could be improved.Soil surveys have been done at least since the 1950s, and the Ministry of Agriculture has published soil maps.

The Turkish Foundation for Combating Soil Erosion is a non-governmental organization as is the Soil Science Society of Turkey. A 2016 study said soil had been degraded and that there was great potential to sequester carbon. There is a soil database (Toprak Bilge Sistem) but a user-id is required for the website. Increasing soil organic carbon (SOC) in agricultural soils is important, and in 2017 total SOC down to 0.7 m was estimated at 9.23 Pg. Another estimate is slightly under 3000 tonnes/km^{2}. SOC is being measured and mapped. Accumulation of soil organic matter depends partly on cultivation but can be hindered by aridity.
