= Climate change in Cyprus =

Emissions, impacts and responses of Cyprus related to climate change

Climate change is predicted to lead to rising temperatures (along with other negative effects of climate change) at a swifter rate in Cyprus than many other areas of the planet. Cyprus is an island nation geographically situated in the Middle East, with low levels of rainfall.

== Greenhouse gas emissions ==
The average carbon emission per person in Cyprus for energy production in 2018 was 6.8 tonnes of CO_{2}.

The country plans to expand the incentive scheme for electric cars since there is a lack of charging stations for electric cars.

== Impacts on the natural environment ==
=== Temperature and weather changes ===
Köppen climate classification map for Cyprus for 1980–2016

2071–2100 map under the most intense climate change scenario. Mid-range scenarios are currently considered more likely

Due to location, Cyprus has always enjoyed an unusually high number of sunny days, with the sun shining for an annual average of 75% of daylight hours.

The climate has changed significantly over the 20th century. Measurements taken in the capital city of Nicosia show an increase in average temperature from 18.9 °C at the beginning of the 20th century, to 19.7 °C at its end, an increase of 0.8 °C. According to the Meteorological Service, rainfall has also declined at a rate of 1 mm per year over the 20th century. Deep water temperatures have also increased by 0.12 °C (0.22 °F) between 1959 and 1989.

Projected increases in temperature range between a minimum increase of 3.6 °C and 5 °C by the end of the century. The number of very hot days on the island is projected to increase by more than two additional weeks per year, with the likely effect of creating an additional 9 days without rainfall per year.

=== Water resources ===
Cyprus is situated in the Eastern Mediterranean and is described as "amongst the geographic areas that are most vulnerable to climate change". Because of the short residence time of waters, the Mediterranean Sea is considered a hot-spot for climate change effects. According to climate projections, the Mediterranean Sea could become warmer. The decrease in precipitation over the region could lead to more evaporation ultimately increasing the Mediterranean Sea salinity. Because of the changes in temperature and salinity, the Mediterranean Sea may become more stratified by the end of the 21st century, with notable consequences on water circulation and biogeochemistry.

== Impacts on human health ==
Changes in climate patterns have facilitated the spread of diseases like malaria, dengue, and West Nile virus. Cyprus now hosts Aedes and Anopheles mosquitoes, vectors for dengue, chikungunya, Zika, and malaria. Ecological and socioeconomic factors contribute to these conditions, making disease surveillance and public health measures crucial. Additionally, climate change has worsened air quality in Cyprus, leading to increased respiratory illnesses and premature deaths.

== Mitigation and adaptation ==
=== Policies and legislation ===
==== Paris Agreement ====
The Paris Agreement is a legally international agreement adopted at the COP 21, its main goal is to limit global warming to below 1.5 degrees Celsius, compared to pre-industrial levels. The Nationally Determined Contributions (NDC's) are the plans to fight climate change adapted for each country. Every party in the agreement has different goals based on its own historical climate records and country's circumstances. All the goals for each country are stated in their NDC. In the case for member countries of the European Union the goals are very similar and the European Union work with a common strategy within the Paris agreement.

== See also ==
- Climate change in Turkey
