= Heatwaves in Turkey =

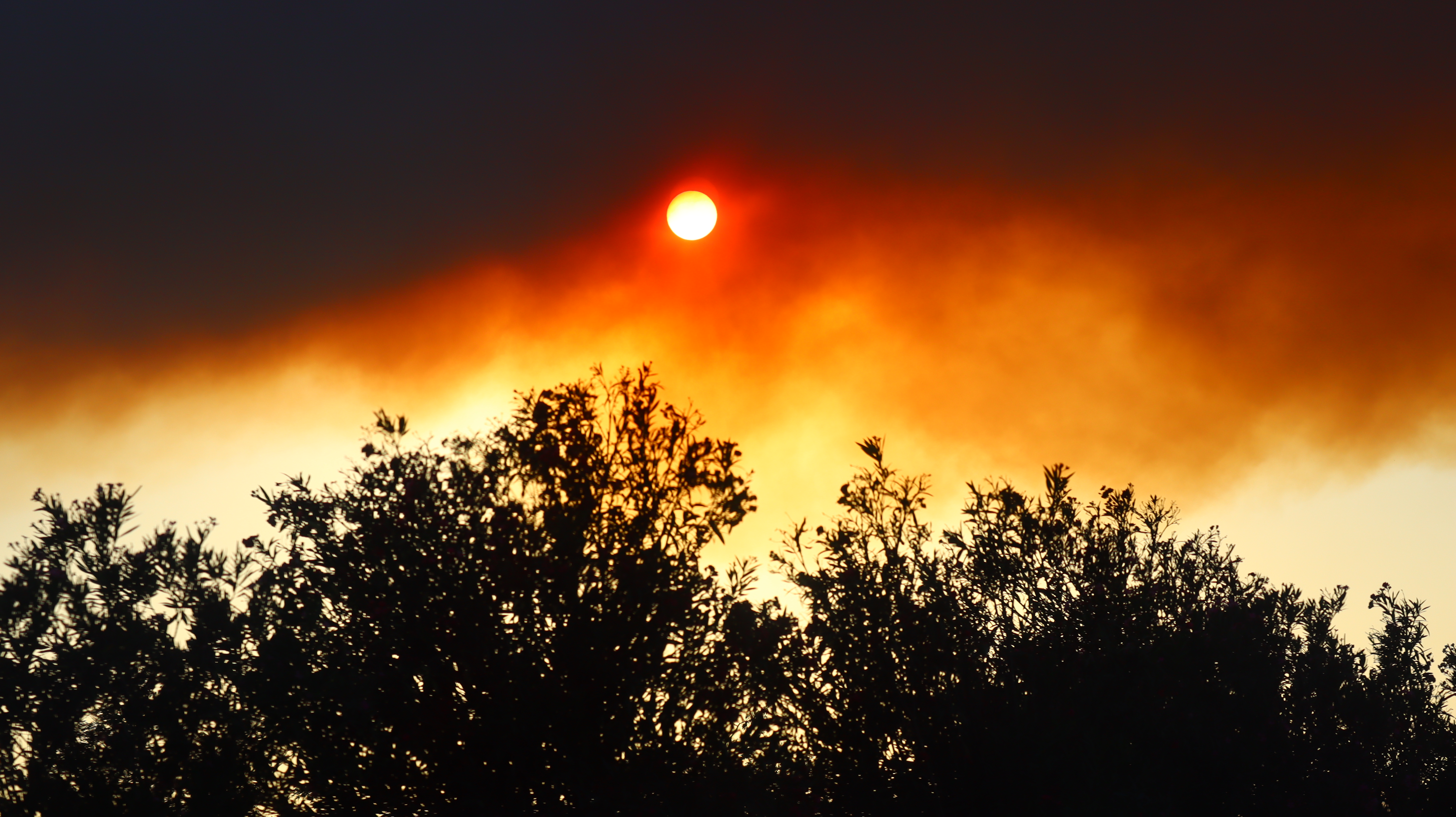
Smoke from a wildfire in July 2025

Heatwaves in Turkey are a hazard and are predicted to last much longer due to climate change in Turkey. The definition of a heatwave includes affecting a large area, being at least 5 degrees above normal and lasting at least 2 days, with high humidity. Heat waves have increased since 1950. In July 2025 there were record breaking temperatures, like the 2025 European heatwaves.
