= Turkish Emissions Trading System =

Market in Turkey for greenhouse gas emissions

The Turkish Emissions Trading System is the carbon emission trading system expected to cover almost half of greenhouse gas emissions by Turkey, with a 50 thousand tCO₂e/year threshold. Reporting started in 2026, with a free pilot phase including industries such as cement. Exporters have to pay the EU Carbon Border Adjustment Mechanism from 2026 until the Turkish ETS starts charging. The implementation phase is due to run from 2027 to 2034. A law was passed in 2025 but allowances have not yet been decided, and it has not yet clear whether the country will join the Cooperative Mechanisms under Article 6 of the Paris Agreement. In 2026 Carbon Market Watch criticised the free allocations, the lack of transparency and the lack of guaranteed absolute emissions reductions. Furthermore, legal scholars have warned that implementing domestic carbon pricing and regulating fossil fuels could expose Turkey to investor-state dispute settlement (ISDS) claims under its older bilateral investment treaties and the Energy Charter Treaty, prompting experts to suggest that the balance between climate regulation and investor protection is increasingly being managed through domestic legislation and individual contracts rather than international treaty amendments.
