= Construction and contracting industry in Turkey =

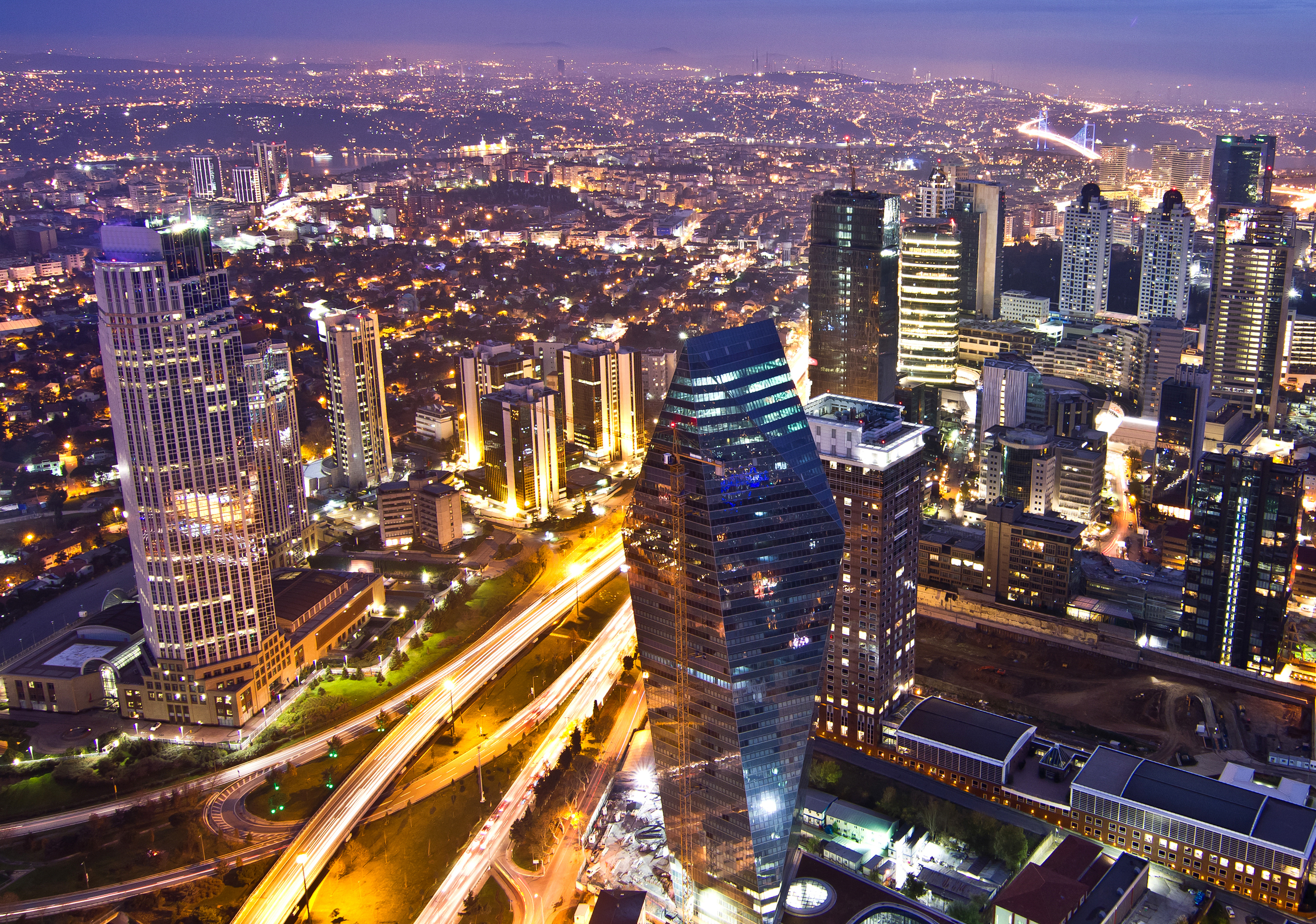
Skyline of Levent business district in Istanbul

The Turkish construction and contracting industry is one of the key sectors of Turkey's economy.

== Earthquakes ==
Some contractors and construction companies in Turkey have been accused of corruption for their lack of compliance with the latest safety regulations and laws, causing many deaths in earthquakes.

== Climate change ==
Turkey is the sixth-largest cement producer in the world and the largest in Europe, and by far the largest exporter to the EU. Cement (clinker) production in 2021 emitted 44 Mt CO_{2}, 8% of the country's total GHG. Climate Trace has estimated the contributions of individual factories, sometimes from kiln heat visible from satellites, and says that Nuh, Göltaş, and Medcem cement plants emitted more than 1 Mt each in 2023. Nuh publish information about their emissions and say some of their cement is low emission, and Medcem publishes some figures whereas Göltaş has less GHG info.

Turkey's construction sector contracted at the end of 2018 and so used less cement. Cement producers in the EU have to buy EU carbon credits, and say the CBAM is needed to protect them from unfair competition from Turkish companies as they pay no carbon price. The CBAM could be up to 50% on the cement price. The proportion of clinker in publicly procured cement is being reduced.

There are almost 10 million buildings in Turkey, and as they are the largest energy consumers there are substantial opportunities for energy savings in both new build and renovations. There is a roadmap, which says that as of 2021 three quarters of building stock is pre-21st century, that is pre energy standards. A typical residential building emits almost 50 kgCO2eq/m2/year, mostly due to the energy used by residents. The Organisation for Economic Co-operation and Development (OECD) has said that more could be done to improve the energy efficiency of buildings, and that tax incentives offered for this would create jobs. Turkey was a co-leader of the group discussing zero-carbon buildings at the 2019 UN Climate Action Summit, and the city of Eskişehir has pledged to convert all existing buildings to zero emissions by 2050. Such energy efficiency improvements can be made in the same programme as increasing resilience to earthquakes in Turkey. However, as of 2023 gas was subsidized. Increasing the proportion of passive houses has been suggested, as has adopting some EU building standards. Thinktank Ember said in 2023 that rooftop solar should be mandatory on new buildings, and say that installation on apartment block roofs is hindered by bureaucracy. To improve the energy efficiency of buildings it has been suggested that green building principles and technologies should be applied.

Although low-energy houses, zero-energy buildings and zero carbon housing will be encouraged, the 2024 long-term plan said that "The existing natural gas transmission and distribution infrastructure will be strengthened, and natural gas access will be provided in areas where renewable sources and waste heat-based district heating/cooling systems are not technically or economically feasible." In rural areas without a piped gas supply, heat pumps could be an alternative to wood, coal and bottled gas: but buying a heat pump is rare as it is very expensive for householders as there is no subsidy. However, owners of larger properties such as shopping centres, schools and government buildings have shown more interest. Direct geothermal heating (not to be confused with heat pumps) installed capacity totaled 3.5 GW thermal (GWt) in 2020, with the potential for 60 GWt.

There is no data on the carbon intensity of cement. Emissions from cement production could be lessened by reducing its clinker content—for example, by making Limestone Calcined Clay Cement, which is only half clinker. The second-largest reduction could be made by switching half the fuel from hard coal and petroleum coke (petcoke) to a mixture of rubber from waste tires, refuse-derived fuel and biomass. Although the country has enough of these materials, most cement kilns (there are 54) use coal, petcoke or lignite as their primary energy source. More cross-laminated timber could be used for building, instead of concrete. Further decarbonisation of cement production would depend heavily on carbon capture, perhaps storing in a salt dome near Lake Tuz or in Diyarbakır Province.

== Turkish contracting in the international market ==
During the periods in which investments slowed down in the public and private sectors, foreign contracting services gained importance. The shrinking of the economy in Turkey and the bottleneck in the construction sector resulting from it, has forced construction companies to concentrate more on business abroad.

The opening of the Turkish contractors to foreign markets started at the beginning of the 1970s. The first country to which Turkish contractors exported their services was Libya, where they started their projects by importing the necessary technology from European countries.

Later on, the growing Turkish contracting services expanded to other foreign markets such as Iraq, Jordan, Saudi Arabia, Kuwait, the United Arab Emirates, Yemen and Iran. Particularly during the 1970s, 90% of the expatriate works undertaken were realized in Arab countries. Since the beginning of the 1980s, the Turkish Contractors have oriented themselves more towards the former Soviet Union countries. In the 1990s, due to the economic depression and the political uncertainties in the Middle Eastern and North African countries, the Turkish Contractors have focused predominantly on the Commonwealth of Independent States, Eastern Europe and Asian countries. In this framework, they have undertaken important projects in the Russian Federation, Ukraine, the Caucasus, the Central Asian Republics, Germany, Pakistan and the Far East.

From the beginning of the 1970s to the end of 2022, Turkish contractors have completed more than 11,605 projects in 133 countries. Their business volume abroad has reached 472 billion US Dollars in 2022. The Turkish Contractors Association (TCA) currently has 139 members from Turkeys main contracting companies. 90% of the members of TCA is composed of engineers and architects. These are responsible for the realisation of 70% of domestic construction works and 80% of over 4,200 projects undertaken in 69 countries.

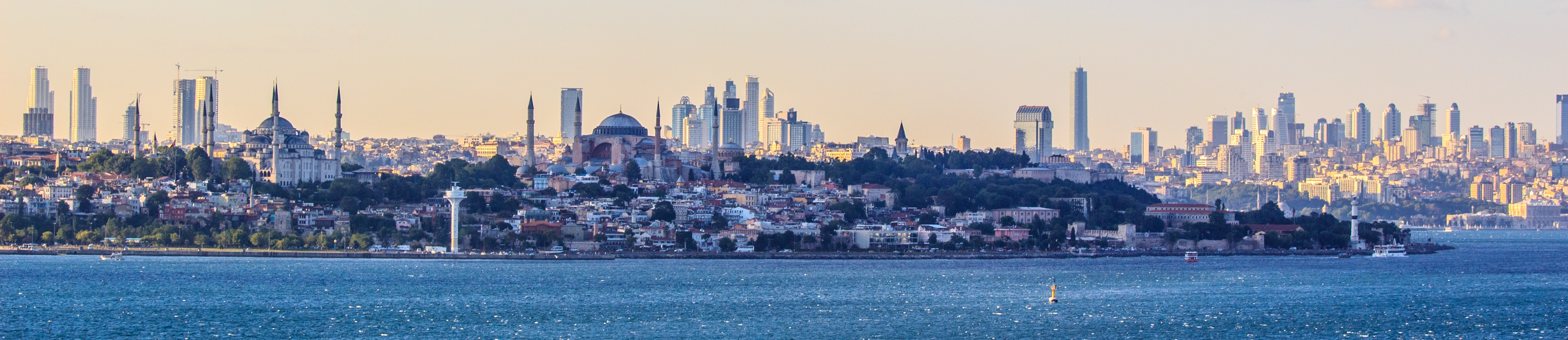
High rises can be seen in the skyline of Istanbul, the most populated city in Turkey and Europe

== See also ==
- Baku–Tbilisi–Ceyhan pipeline
- Kashagan Field
- Samsun-Ceyhan Pipeline
