= Turkish Electricity Distribution Corporation =

Turkish state-owned distribution network operator for electricity

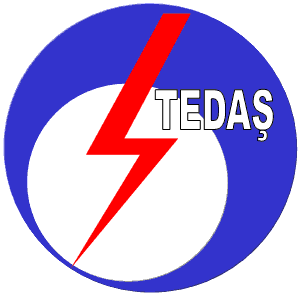
- Native name: Türkiye Elektrik Dağıtım A.Ş. (TEDAŞ)
- Company type: State-owned enterprise
- Website: http://www.tedas.gov.tr

Turkish Electricity Distribution Corporation (Turkish: Türkiye Elektrik Dağıtım A.Ş. or TEDAŞ) is a distribution network operator for electricity covering Turkey. It has Electricity Distribution Companies across the country. In 2021 it was criticized for its accounting.
