= Economy of Turkey =

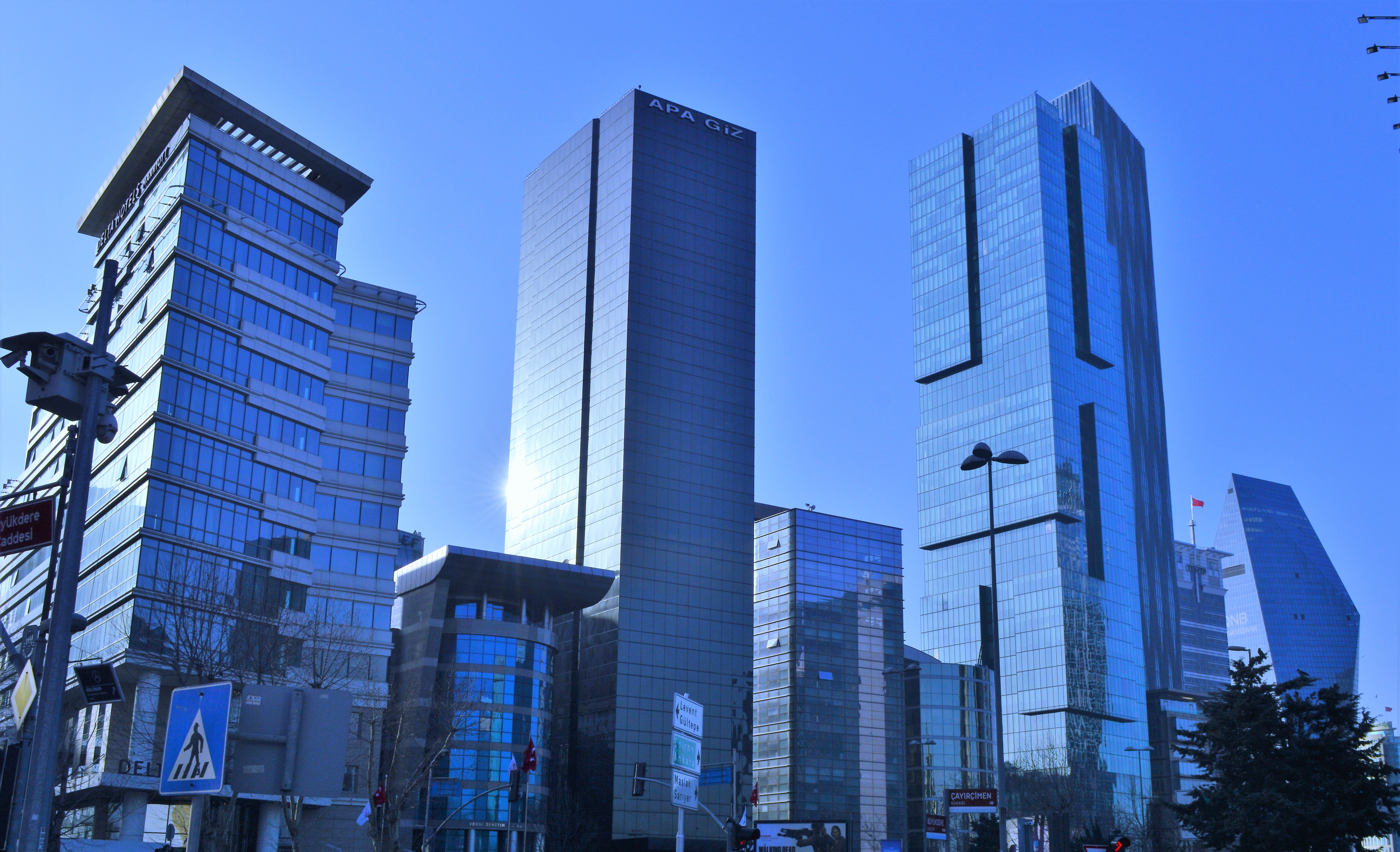
- Istanbul is the largest city in Europe (Note: Istanbul straddles both Europe and Asia, with its commercial and historical centre and two-thirds of the population in Europe, the rest in Asia. Istanbul total (2023) = 15,655,924 European side (25 districts) = 10,030,990 Anatolian side (14 districts) = 5,624,934) and the chief financial and economic center of Turkey.
- Currency: Turkish lira (TRY, ₺)
- Fiscal year: Calendar year
- Trade organisations: G-20; OECD; BSEC; MIKTA; ECO; EU Customs Union; OTS; WTO, and others
- Country group: Developing country; Upper middle-income economy; Newly industrialized country; Diversified, industrializing economy; Industrial country

Statistics
- Population: ▲86,320,602 (2026)
- GDP: ▲$1.817 trillion (nominal, 2026); ▲$4.026 trillion (PPP, 2026)
- GDP rank: 16th (nominal, 2026); 11th (PPP, 2026)
- GDP growth: ▲3.7% (2025); ▲2.7% (2026)
- GDP per capita: ▲$21,079 (nominal; 2026); ▲$46,679 (PPP; 2026)
- GDP per capita rank: 59th (nominal; 2026); 57st (PPP; 2026)
- GDP per capita growth: ▲3.2% (2025)
- GDP by sector: Manufacturing: 15.6%; Wholesale and retail trade: 12.9%; Real estate activities: 9.2%; Transport and storage: 7.6%; Construction: 5.9%; Agriculture, forestry and fishing: 5.2%; (2025)
- Inflation (CPI): ▲31% (2025) (TÜİK); ▲56% (2025) (ENAG)
- Population below national poverty line: ▼13.0% at 50% of the median equivalised income (2025); ▼29.8% at risk of poverty or social exclusion (AROPE 2025)
- Gini coefficient: ▼43.9 (2025)
- Human Development Index: ▼0.853 (2023, 51st); ▼0.708 (2023, IHDI 60th)
- Corruption Perceptions Index: ▼31 out of 100 points (2025; 124th rank)
- Labour force: ▲35,034,000 (2026); About 3 million Turks work abroad.; ▼48.1% employment rate (2026)
- Labour force by occupation: Agriculture, forestry and fishing: 13.7%; Secondary sector: Industry: 19.7%; Secondary sector: Construction: 6.8%; Services: 59.8% (2026)
- Unemployment: ▼7.6% (2026)
- Youth unemployment: ▼15.3% (2025)
- Average gross salary: ₺47,346 / €1,334 (per month, 2024)
- Average net salary: ₺33,913 / €956 (per month, 2024)
- Main industries: Machinery; tourism; textile; electronics; construction; shipbuilding; autos; mining; metalworking; defence; petroleum; food processing; cotton

External
- Exports: ▲$396.8 billion (Note: Goods) (2025 goods and services)
- Export goods: Transport equipment; machinery; metal manufactures; apparel; electronics; foodstuffs; textile; plastic
- Main export partners: Germany 8.3%; United Kingdom 5.9%; United States 5.5%; Italy 5.2%; France 4.4%; Iraq 4.3%; Spain 4.2%; Romania 3.3%; Netherlands 3%; United Arab Emirates 2.8% (2025)
- Imports: ▲$424.5 billion (2025 goods and services)
- Import goods: Fuels; machinery; chemicals; semi-finished goods; transport equipment
- Main import partners: China 14.1%; Germany 8.8%; Russia 8.3%; Italy 6.1%; United States 5.1%; France 4%; Switzerland 3.2%; Spain 2.9%; South Korea 2.9%; United Kingdom 2.4% (2024)
- FDI stock: ▲$180.3 billion (31 December 2017 est.); ▲ Abroad: $47.44 billion (31 December 2017 est.)
- Current account: ▼ −0.77% of GDP (2024)
- Gross external debt: ▲$500 billion (2024) (28th)

Public finance
- Government debt: ▼29.5% of GDP (2024)
- Foreign reserves: ▼$144.343 billion (2025) (22nd)
- Budget balance: ▼ −5.4% (of GDP) (2023)
- Revenue: $234.9 billion (2022 est.)
- Spending: $269.1 billion (2022 est.)
- Economic aid: donor: $8.399 billion, 0.79% of GNI (2018)
- Credit rating: Standard & Poor's: BB-; Outlook: Stable (March 2024); Moody's: B1; Outlook: Positive (December 2024); Fitch: BB-; Outlook: Positive (May 2025); Scope: BB-; Outlook: Stable (December 2025*)
- All values, unless otherwise stated, are in US dollars.

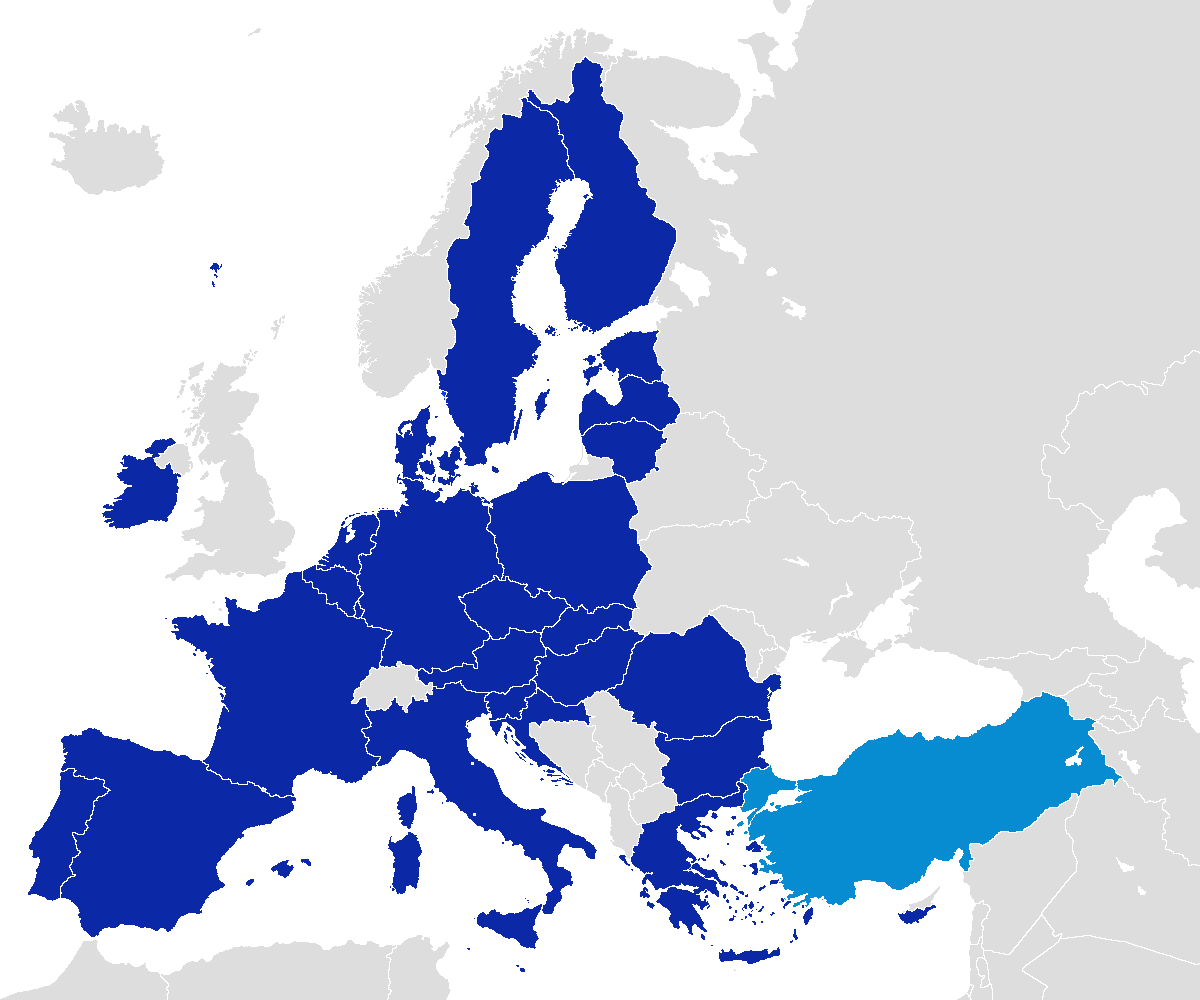
After becoming one of the early members of the Council of Europe in 1950, Turkey became an associate member of the EEC in 1963, joined the EU Customs Union in 1995 and started full membership negotiations with the European Union in 2005.

Turkey has an emerging free-market economy. It ranked as the 16th-largest in the world and 7th-largest in Europe by nominal GDP in 2025. It also ranked as the 11th-largest in the world and 5th-largest in Europe by PPP in 2025. Turkey is a founding member of the OECD and G20. Ratified in 1995, the European Union–Turkey Customs Union is a free trade area between Turkey and the European Union.

Turkey experienced an economic boom since the 2000s, later curtailed and moderated by a protracted downturn since 2018. It is the fourth-most-visited destination in the world, with its tourism sector generating 10-15% of total GDP. Turkish inflation has been a perennial challenge since the 1970s due to historic pro-growth economic and monetary policies.

== History ==
The economy of the Ottoman Empire was characterised by international trade and commerce, silk and textile weaving, agriculture, dairy farming and pastoralism. The Empire's economy began to stagnate in the 18th century, after it lost important territories in Central and Eastern Europe. By then, the Empire had also lost its monopoly in spice and silk trade between Asia and Europe, as a result of the discovery of new maritime routes which increasingly replaced the Ottoman-controlled land routes. Several other factors also led to the relative economic obsolescence of the late Ottoman Empire, such as its failure to immediately adapt to the innovative methods in industrial production that were introduced with the First Industrial Revolution in the 18th and 19th centuries; though improvements in industrial production took place during and after the Tanzimat reforms, in the late 19th and early 20th centuries. The National Economy (Millî İktisat) program implemented by the Committee of Union and Progress at the end of the Ottoman Empire — which involved the expropriation of Christian property and the elimination of Christians from the economy — exerted a major and enduring influence on the political economy of the Republic of Turkey.

The economic history of the modern Republic of Turkey has four eras. The first era's development policy, put into motion with Atatürk's reforms, was defined by the transition from a mainly agricultural economy into a more diversified and industrialized economy. It emphasized on private accumulation between 1923 and 1929. The second era's focus was on state accumulation in a period of global crises between 1929 and 1945. The third era focused on state-guided industrialization based on import-substituting protectionism between 1950 and 1980. The fourth and current era began with the opening of the economy to liberal trade in goods, services, and financial market transactions on January 24, 1980. Under Prime Minister Turgut Özal, the administration devalued the lira, liberalized trade and deepened the financial sector, and successfully integrated Turkey into global markets that created a robust, export-oriented business class. However, it was also marred by macroeconomic instability, volatile inflation and recurrent fiscal crises through the 1990s.

Following a deep banking recession in 2001, the government implemented structural reforms under a stringent IMF program, leading to a decade of rapid expansion. Output quadrupled between 2001 and 2013 and Turkey transitioned to an upper-middle-income country with strong exports in automotive, textile and appliances manufacturing that also fueled a construction boom and credit-based domestic consumption.

Since 2018, Turkey under Recep Tayyip Erdoğan has faced significant macroeconomic vulnerabilities as unorthodox monetary policies (Erdoğanomics) such as lowering interest rates through repeated currency interventions despite soaring inflation had led to a sharp depreciation of the Turkish lira and an economic crisis.

== Data ==
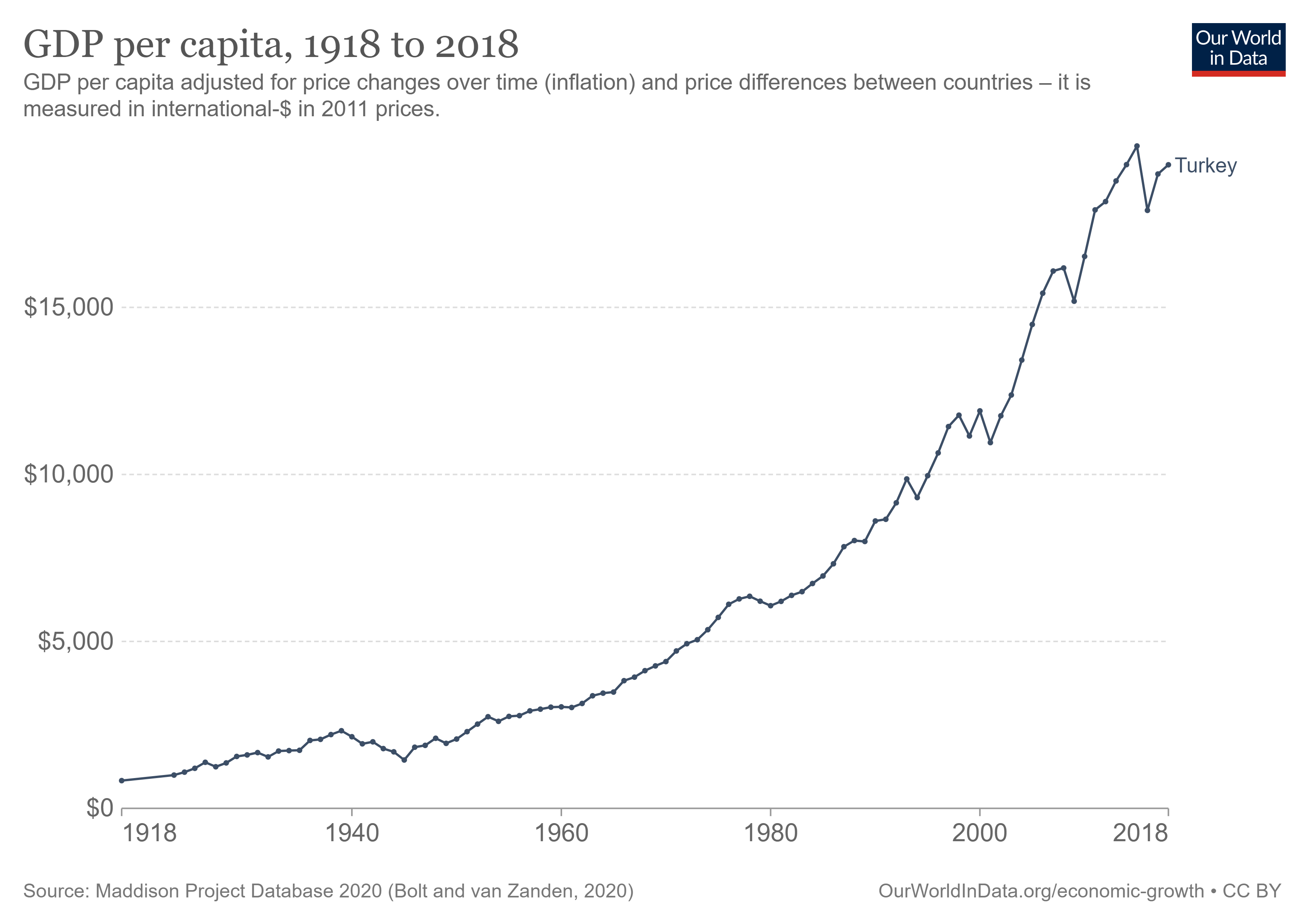
Change in per capita GDP of Turkey, 1913–2018. Figures are inflation-adjusted to 2011 International dollars.

Turkey's CO2 emissions growth compared GDP growth

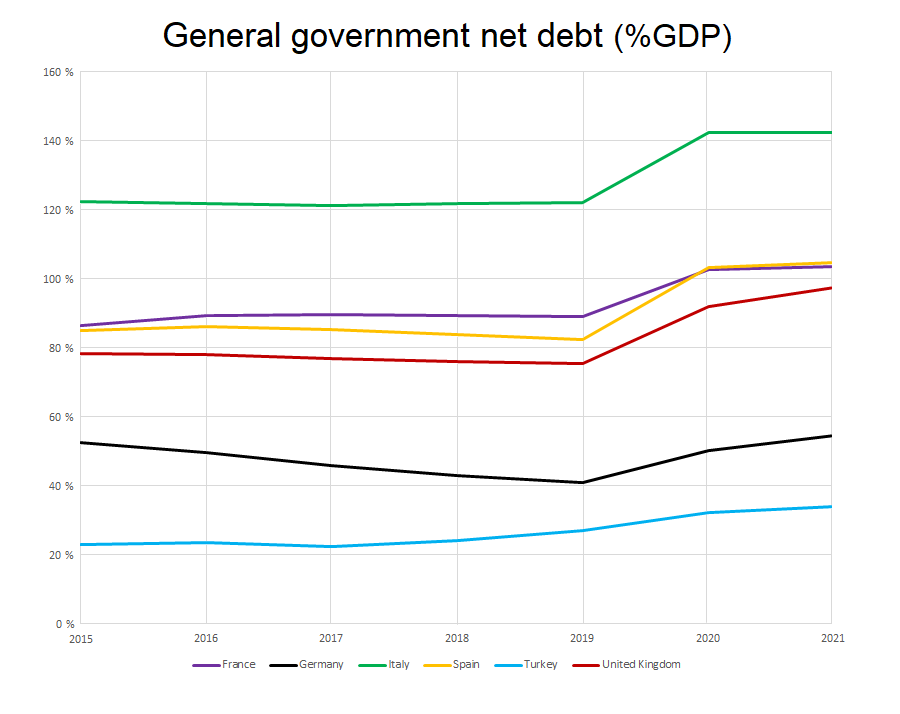
General government net debt as percentage of GDP for selected European countries, including Turkey

The following table shows the main economic indicators from 1980 to 2025 (with IMF staff estimates for 2026–2031).

Year	GDP (in bil. US$PPP)	GDP per capita (in US$ PPP)	GDP (in bil. US$nominal)	GDP per capita (in US$ nominal)	GDP growth (real)	Inflation rate (in percent)	Unemployment (in percent)
1980	161.1	3,584.8	96.6	2,149.7	▼-0.8%	110.6%	7.2%
1981	▲184.1	▲4,003.1	▲97.9	▼2,128.9	▲4.4%	▼36.4%	7.2%
1982	▲202.2	▲4,297.2	▼88.9	▼1,890.7	▲3.4%	▼31.1%	▲7.6%
1983	▲220.1	▲4,573.8	▼85.0	▼1,766.5	▲4.8%	▲31.3%	▼7.5%
1984	▲243.6	▲4,952.7	▼82.7	▼1,681.0	▲6.8%	▲48.4%	▼7.4%
1985	▲262.0	▲5,216.3	▲92.9	▲1,849.0	▲4.3%	▼44.5%	▼6.9%
1986	▲285.8	▲5,577.8	▲102.4	▲1,997.9	▲6.9%	▼34.6%	▲7.7%
1987	▲322.2	▲6,169.5	▲119.0	▲2,277.6	▲10.0%	▲39.0%	▲8.1%
1988	▲340.7	▲6,403.1	▲125.1	▲2,350.7	▲2.1%	▲73.2%	▲8.7%
1989	▲354.9	▲6,552.9	▲147.8	▲2,728.2	▲0.3%	▼63.2%	▼8.6%
1990	▲402.3	▲7,299.3	▲207.6	▲3,766.2	▲9.3%	▼60.4%	▼8.0%
1991	▲419.8	▲7,488.5	▲208.5	▼3,719.1	▲0.9%	▲66.0%	▼7.7%
1992	▲455.0	▲7,984.9	▲219.3	▲3,847.4	▲6.0%	▲70.1%	▲7.9%
1993	▲503.3	▲8,690.1	▲248.7	▲4,293.6	▲8.0%	▼66.1%	▲8.4%
1994	▼486.0	▼8,259.7	▼179.4	▼3,049.4	▼-5.5%	▲104.5%	▼8.0%
1995	▲531.8	▲8,900.1	▲233.6	▲3,910.0	▲7.2%	▼89.6%	▼7.1%
1996	▲579.5	▲9,551.9	▲250.6	▲4,130.0	▲7.0%	▼80.2%	▼6.1%
1997	▲633.9	▲10,293.5	▲261.9	▲4,253.6	▲7.5%	▲85.7%	▲6.3%
1998	▲660.8	▲10,579.5	▲277.7	▲4,445.7	▲3.1%	▼84.7%	▲6.4%
1999	▼649.7	▼10,254.0	▼254.3	▼4,013.3	▼-3.1%	▼64.9%	▲7.2%
2000	▲710.9	▲11,060.8	▲273.6	▲4,256.6	▲7.0%	▼55.0%	▼6.0%
2001	▼687.2	▼10,545.2	▼203.0	▼3,115.1	▼-5.5%	▼54.2%	▲7.8%
2002	▲742.8	▲11,253.7	▲238.7	▲3,616.1	▲6.4%	▼45.1%	▲9.8%
2003	▲801.4	▲11,997.4	▲317.3	▲4,751.0	▲5.8%	▼25.3%	▲9.9%
2004	▲904.6	▲13,381.7	▲408.3	▲6,040.2	▲9.9%	▼8.6%	▼9.7%
2005	▲1,018.0	▲14,874.9	▲506.8	▲7,405.5	▲9.1%	▼8.1%	▼9.2%
2006	▲1,123.5	▲16,213.6	▲554.9	▲8,007.8	▲7.1%	▲9.6%	▼8.7%
2007	▲1,212.9	▲17,288.2	▲686.9	▲9,790.9	▲5.1%	▼8.8%	▲8.9%
2008	▲1,247.6	▲17,559.7	▲787.9	▲11,089.0	▲0.9%	▲10.4%	▲9.8%
2009	▼1,194.0	▼16,575.0	▼656.1	▼9,108.0	▼-4.9%	▼6.2%	▲12.9%
2010	▲1,311.8	▲17,935.0	▲783.0	▲10,705.6	▲8.5%	▲8.6%	▼11.0%
2011	▲1,485.9	▲20,018.7	▲843.3	▲11,361.9	▲11.0%	▼6.5%	▼9.0%
2012	▲1,586.3	▲21,101.2	▲882.4	▲11,738.3	▲4.8%	▲8.9%	▼8.3%
2013	▲1,750.2	▲22,984.7	▲962.5	▲12,639.3	▲8.5%	▼7.5%	▲8.9%
2014	▲1,862.7	▲24,133.3	▼943.3	▼12,222.2	▲4.6%	▲8.9%	▲9.9%
2015	▲1,989.1	▲25,430.0	▼868.2	▼11,099.8	▲5.8%	▼7.7%	▲10.3%
2016	▲2,074.7	▲26,170.2	▲870.3	▼10,978.3	▲3.3%	▲7.8%	▲10.9%
2017	▲2,277.1	▲28,353.4	▼863.9	▼10,756.7	▲7.8%	▲11.2%	10.9%
2018	▲2,331.5	▲28,640.4	▼807.3	▼9,917.1	▲3.5%	▲16.3%	10.9%
2019	▲2,396.2	▲29,016.6	▼775.2	▼9,387.7	▲1.3%	▼15.2%	▲13.7%
2020	▲2,435.6	▲29,209.2	▼730.3	▼8,758.7	▲1.8%	▼12.3%	▼13.1%
2021	▲2,727.4	▲32,412.3	▲827.7	▲9,836.0	▲11.8%	▲19.6%	▼12.0%
2022	▲3,081.2	▲36,257.5	▲924.8	▲10,882.0	▲5.4%	▲72.3%	▼10.4%
2023	▲3,358.0	▲39,354.5	▲1,153.3	▲13,516.3	▲5.0%	▼53.9%	▼9.4%
2024	▲3,563.7	▲41,671.7	▲1,361.0	▲15,914.3	▲3.5%	▲58.5%	▼8.7%
2025	▲3,794.2	▲44,208.4	▲1,602.9	▲18,676.0	▲3.7%	▼34.9%	▼8.3%
Numbers below are 2026 IMF estimates.
2026	▲4,025.8	▲46,678.7	▲1,818.0	▲21,079.3	▲2.7%	▼31.2%	▼8.2%
2027	▲4,301.1	▲49,635.5	▲1,950.8	▲22,512.6	▲3.6%	▼26.5%	▲8.3%
2028	▲4,564.9	▲52,441.1	▲2,073.8	▲23,823.5	▲4.0%	▼20.6%	8.3%
2029	▲4,838.6	▲55,341.4	▲2,187.1	▲25,014.8	▲4.0%	▼17.1%	▼8.2%
2030	▲5,127.0	▲58,394.1	▲2,307.5	▲26,281.2	▲4.0%	▼15.0%	8.2%
2031	▲5,424.7	▲61,406.2	▲2,436.3	▲27,577.8	▲4.0%	▼13.2%	8.2%

== Main economic sectors ==
As of November 2023, there are 1,086,670 registered companies based in Turkey. The sector with the highest number of companies registered in the country is manufacturing, with 241,362. This is followed by wholesale trading and services with 197,476 and 187,325 companies respectively.

=== Agricultural, fishing and forestry sector ===
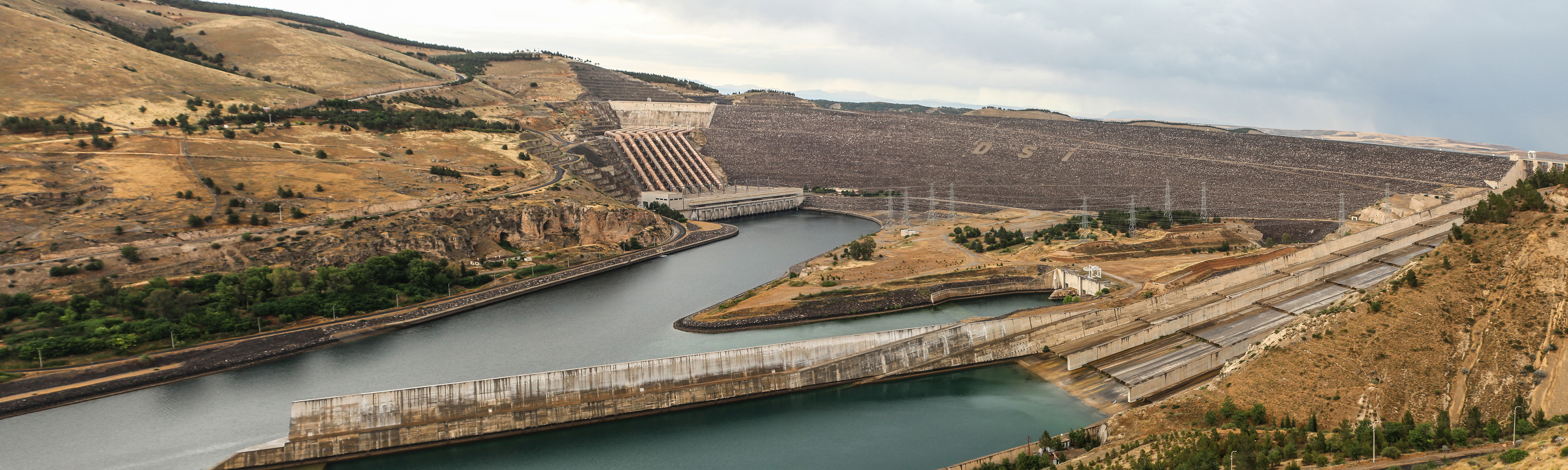
The Atatürk Dam is the largest of the 22 dams in the Southeastern Anatolia Project. The program includes 22 dams, 19 hydraulic power plants, and the irrigation of 1.82 million hectares of land. The total cost of the project is estimated at $32 billion.

Agriculture is still an important sector of Turkey's economy, and the country is one of the world's top ten agricultural producers. Wheat, sugar beet, milk, poultry, cotton, vegetables and fruit are major products; and Turkey is the world's largest grower of hazelnuts, apricots, and oregano. Almost all the seeds used in Turkey are produced domestically.

Half of Turkey's land is agricultural, and farming employs about 15% of the workforce, but under half a million farmers. It provides about 10% of exports and over 5% of gross domestic product (GDP). Over 380 billion lira of agricultural subsidy is budgeted for 2024.

Despite being a major food producer, Turkey is a net wheat importer, much of it coming from Russia and Ukraine. Turkey is the European Union's fourth largest vegetable supplier and seventh largest fruit supplier. Turkey would like to extend the EU Customs Union Agreement to agricultural products.

Around half of Turkey's agricultural greenhouse gas is due to cattle. (Note: Total 72 Mt: 27 Mt enteric fermentation + 61% of 9 Mt manure management = 32 Mt + unknown share of agricultural soils.) According to the World Bank, the sector should adapt more to climate change in Turkey and make technical improvements. The Ministry of Agriculture and Forestry has a strategic plan to 2028.

=== Industry ===
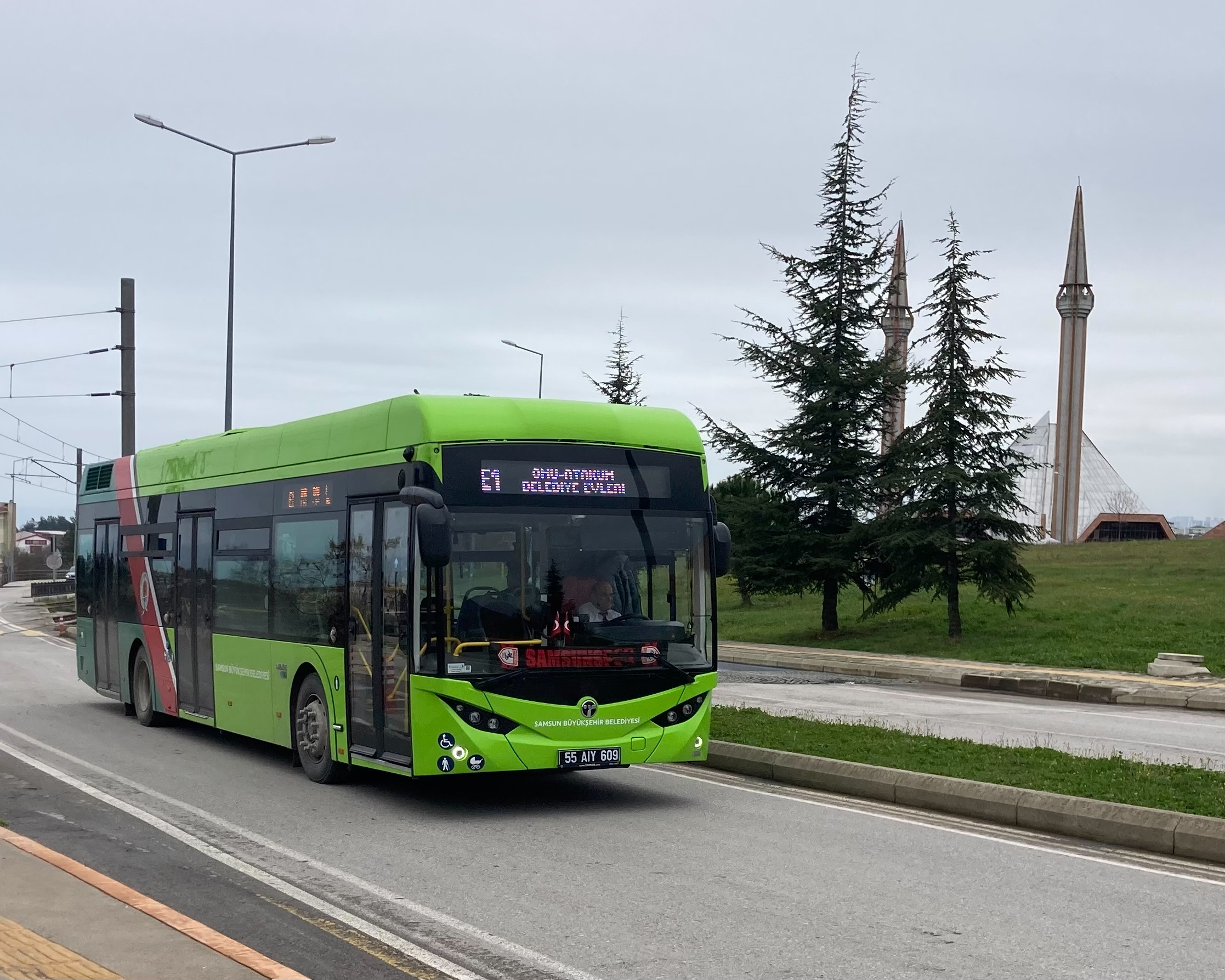
Electric vehicles such as buses are manufactured

Industry is about a quarter of the economy of Turkey, and is mostly manufacturing. Heavy industry is tending to move out of the EU due to Turkey's laxer pollution regulations and cheaper energy. However, there are concerns about authoritarianism in the government of Turkey and lack of progress in decarbonisation.

=== Service sector ===
==== Banking and finance ====
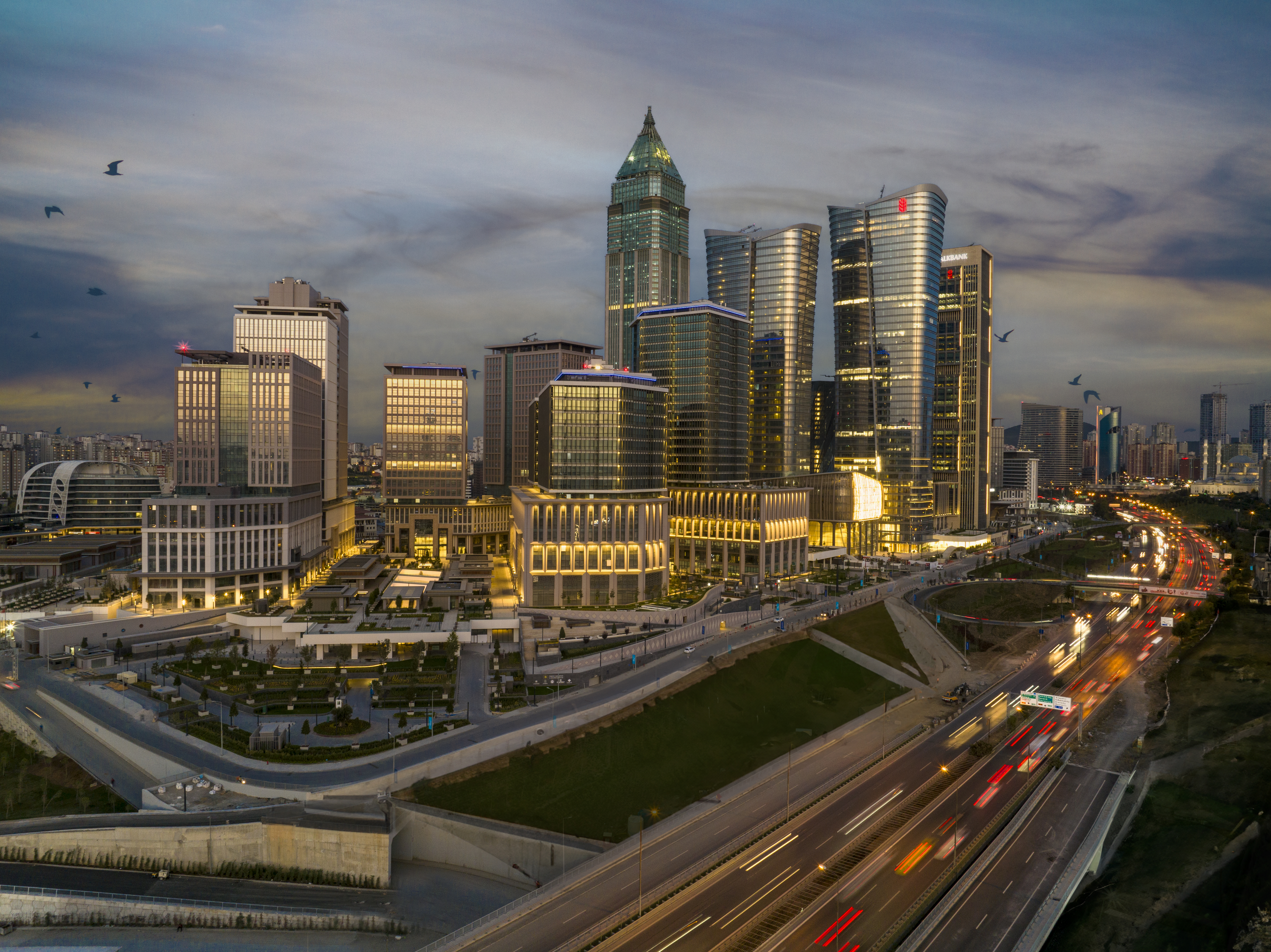
The Turkish Central Bank and other state-owned banks such as Ziraat Bank, VakıfBank and Halkbank have their new headquarters at the Istanbul Financial Center (IFC).

During the 19th and early 20th centuries, Bankalar Caddesi (Banks Street) in Istanbul was the financial center of the Ottoman Empire, where the headquarters of the Ottoman Bank (established as the Bank-ı Osmanî in 1856, and later reorganized as the Bank-ı Osmanî-i Şahane in 1863) and the Ottoman Stock Exchange (1866) were located. Bankalar Caddesi continued to be Istanbul's main financial district until the 1990s, when most Turkish banks began moving their headquarters to the modern central business districts of Levent and Maslak.

Originally established as the Ottoman Stock Exchange (Dersaadet Tahvilat Borsası) in 1866, and reorganized to its current structure at the beginning of 1986, the Istanbul Stock Exchange (ISE) is the sole securities market of Turkey. In 1995, the Istanbul Stock Exchange moved to its current building in the Istinye quarter. The Istanbul Gold Exchange was also established in 1995.

The Central Bank of the Republic of Turkey (Türkiye Cumhuriyet Merkez Bankası) was founded in 1930 as a privileged joint-stock company. The CBRT possesses the sole right to issue notes. It also has the obligation to provide for the monetary requirements of the state agricultural and commercial enterprises.

The "New Turkish lira" (TRY) was introduced on 1 January 2005. On 1 January 2009, the New Turkish lira was renamed once again as the "Turkish lira", with the introduction of new banknotes and coins.

Banking came under stress beginning in October 2008, as a result of the 2008 financial crisis. Turkish banking authorities warned state-run banks against the pullback of loans from the larger financial sectors.

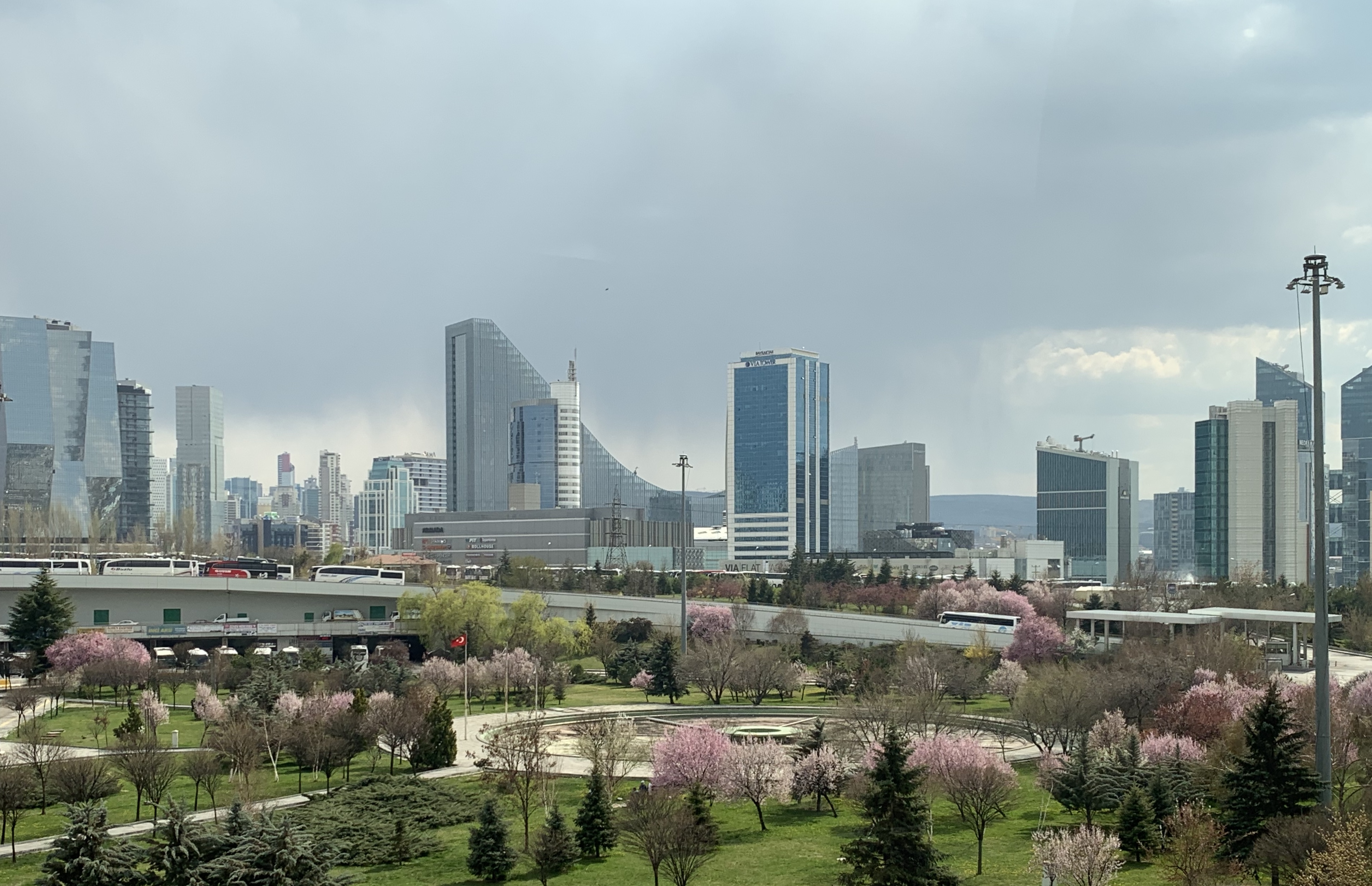
Söğütözü business district in Ankara, Turkey's capital and second largest city

Turkey's economy resumed its growth between 2009 and 2013, which was followed by a period of stagnation and recession between 2014 and 2020. Turkey's GDP began to recover and grow again in the period between 2020 and 2024.

In 2020, the total value of assets of the banking sector in Turkey amounted to more than $800 billion. As of January 2021, there were a total of 48 banks operating with 9,880 branches in Turkey and 71 branches abroad. As of October 2021, the foreign currency deposits of the citizens and residents in Turkish banks stood at $234 billion, equivalent to around half of all deposits. As of October 2024, the foreign currency reserves of the Turkish Central Bank were $85 billion, its gold reserves were $67.4 billion, while its official reserve assets stood at $159.8 billion.

==== Education ====
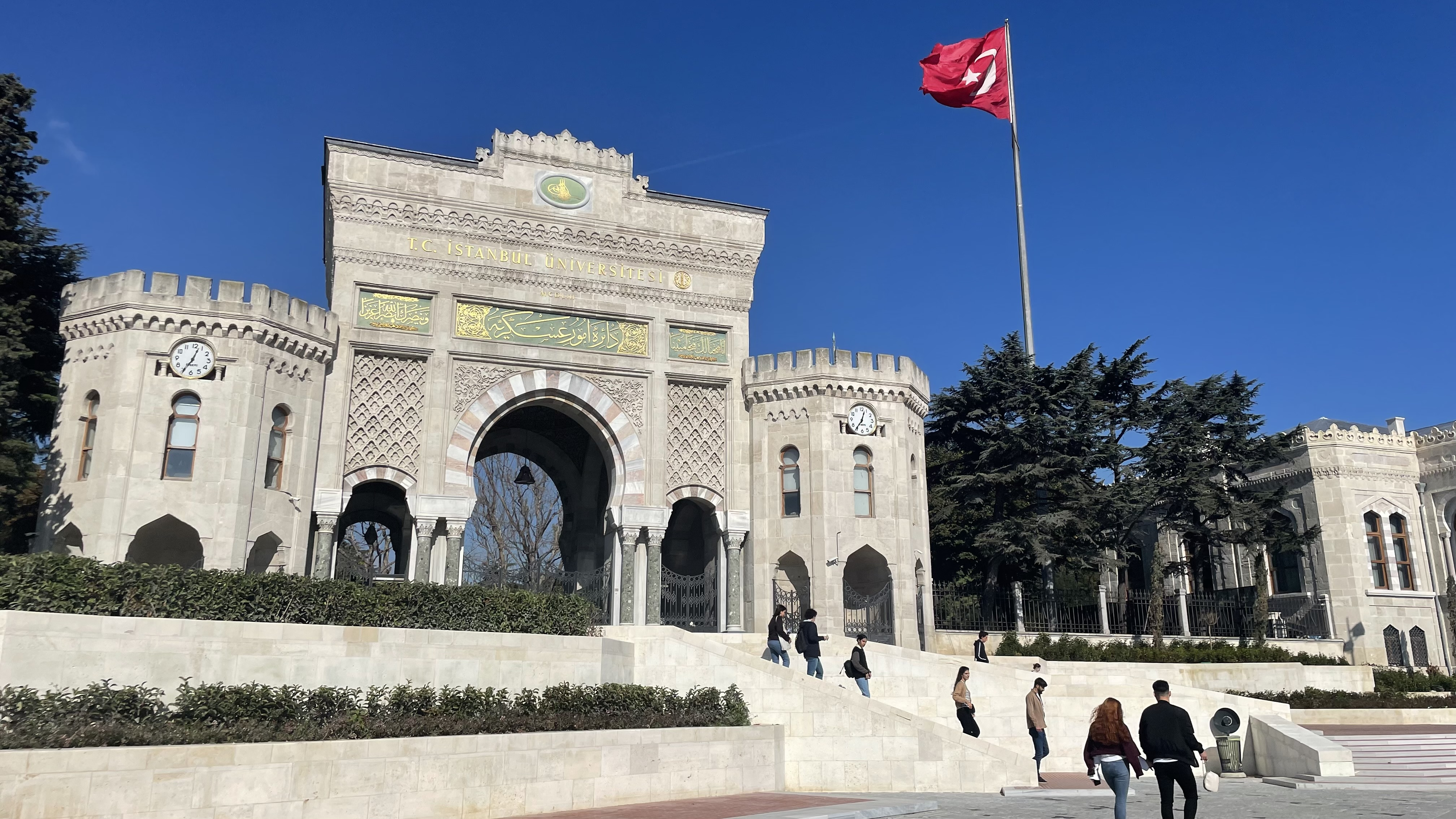
Istanbul University, founded in 1453 by Sultan Mehmed II, was previously known as Darülfünun. On 1 August 1933, as part of Atatürk's reforms, it was reorganized and became the Republic's first modern university.

Education in Turkey is governed by a national system which was established in accordance with Atatürk's Reforms. It is a state-supervised system designed to produce a skillful professional class for the social and economic institutes of the country.

Compulsory education lasts 12 years. Primary and secondary education is financed by the state and free of charge in public schools, between the ages of 6 and 19. Turkey has over 200 universities as of 2022. Students intending to pursue higher education take the ÖSYS exam, after which high school graduates are assigned to universities according to their performance.

Turkey has 97% of primary school enrollment among all eligible children as of 2019. This number has significantly dropped with the Syrian refugee crisis. Many Syrian children left school during the crisis.

In 2002, the total expenditure on education in Turkey amounted to $13.4 billion, including the state budget allocated through the National Ministry of Education and private and international funds. The share of national wealth invested in educational institutions is higher in Turkey than the average among OECD countries. The Scientific and Technological Research Council of Turkey is the main national body of R&D in Turkey.

The Human Rights Measurement Initiative (HRMI) finds that when taking into consideration Turkey's income level, the nation is achieving 61.7% of what should be possible based on its resources (income) for primary education and 86.1% for secondary education.

==== Healthcare ====
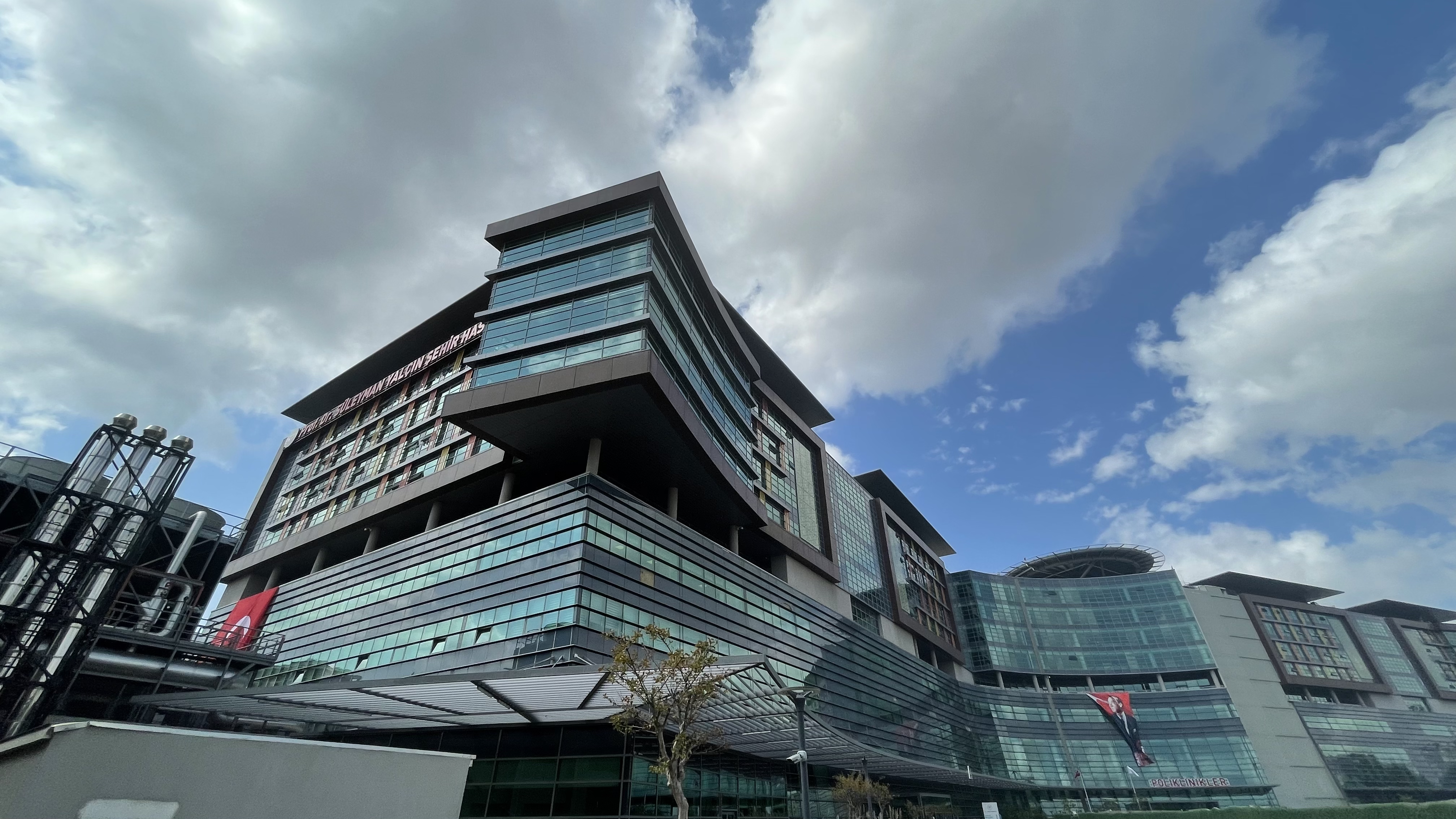
Göztepe Prof. Dr. Süleyman Yalçın City Hospital in Istanbul

Healthcare in Turkey consists of a mix of public and private health services. Turkey introduced universal health care in 2003. Known as Universal Health Insurance Genel Sağlık Sigortası, it is funded by a tax surcharge on employers, currently at 5%. Public-sector funding covers approximately 75.2% of health expenditures.

Despite universal health care, total expenditure on health as a share of GDP is the lowest among OECD countries at 6.3% of GDP, much lower than the OECD average of 9.3%. Median age in Turkey is 30 years compared to 43.9 average in EU countries. Aging population is the prime reason for higher healthcare expenditure in Europe. Life expectancy is 78.5 years, compared with the EU average of 81 years.

==== Telecommunications and media ====
As of 2008, there were 17,502,000 operational landline telephones in Turkey, which ranked 18th in the world; while there were 65,824,000 registered mobile phones in the country, which ranked 15th in the world during the same year. The largest landline telephone operator is Türk Telekom, which also owns TTNET, the largest internet service provider in Turkey. The largest mobile phone operators in the country are Turkcell, Vodafone Turkey, Avea and TTNET Mobil.

The telecommunications liberalisation process started in 2004 after the creation of the Telecommunication Authority, and is still ongoing. Private sector companies operate in mobile telephony, long-distance telephony and Internet access. Additional digital exchanges are permitting a rapid increase in subscribers; the construction of a network of technologically advanced intercity trunk lines, using both fiber-optic cable and digital microwave radio relay, is facilitating communication between urban centres.

The remote areas of the country are reached by a domestic satellite system, while the number of subscribers to mobile-cellular telephone service is growing rapidly.

The main line international telephone service is provided by the SEA-ME-WE 3 submarine communications cable and by submarine fiber-optic cables in the Mediterranean Sea and Black Sea that link Turkey with Italy, Greece, Israel, Bulgaria, Romania, and Russia. In 2002, there were 12 Intelsat satellite earth stations; and 328 mobile satellite terminals in the Inmarsat and Eutelsat systems.

Türksat A.Ş. is the primary communications satellite operator of Turkey, controlling the Turksat series of satellites. Göktürk-1, Göktürk-2 and Göktürk-3 are Turkey's earth observation satellites for reconnaissance, operated by the Turkish Ministry of National Defense. BILSAT-1 and RASAT are the scientific observation satellites operated by the TÜBİTAK Space Technologies Research Institute, which (together with Turkish Aerospace Industries and Aselsan) also takes part in the production of Turkey's satellites.

As of 2001, there were 16 AM, 107 FM, and six shortwave radio stations in the country.

As of 2015, there were 42,275,017 internet users in Turkey, which ranked 15th in the world; while as of 2012, there were 7,093,000 internet hosts in the country, which ranked 16th in the world.

==== Transport ====
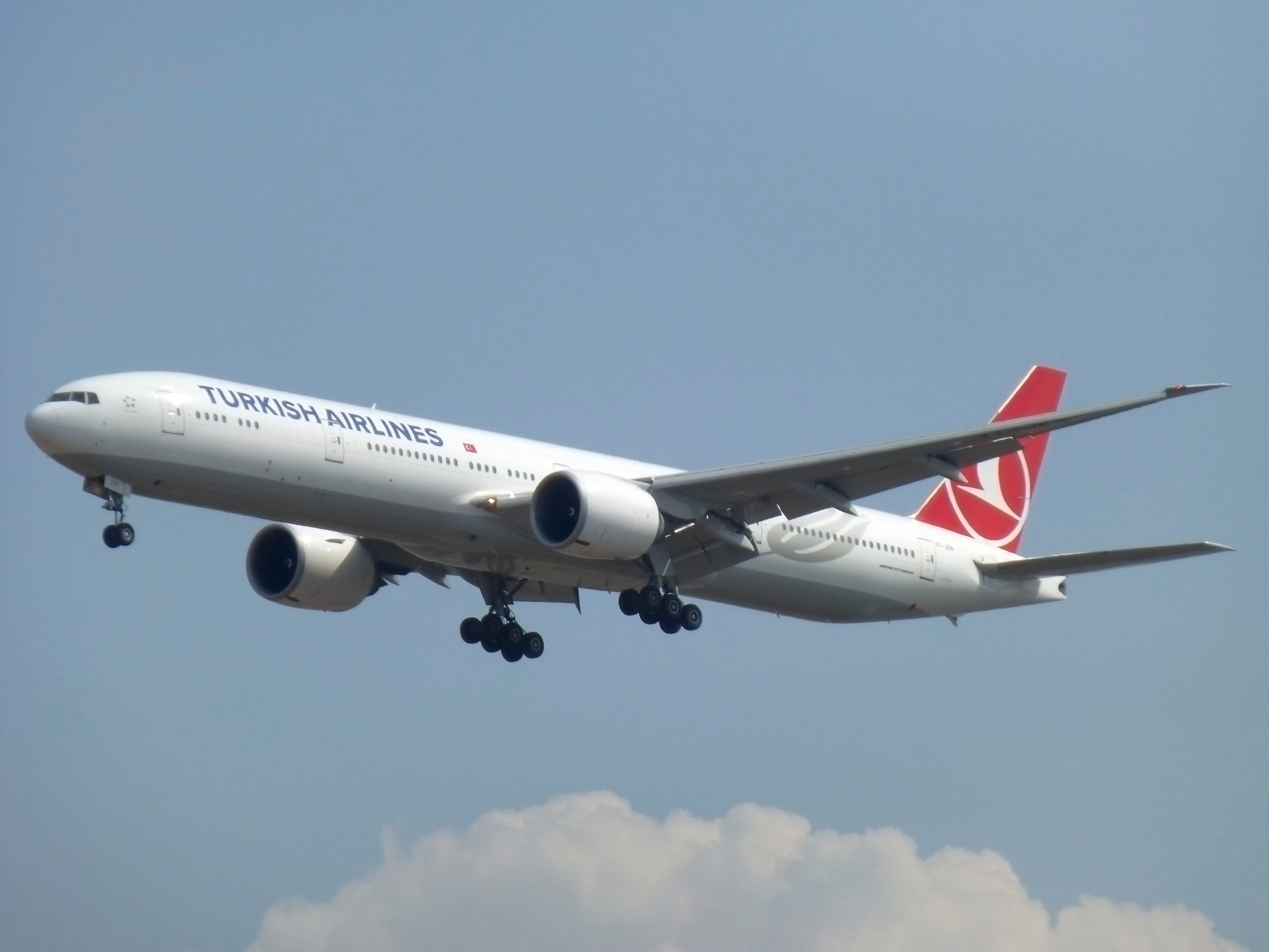
Turkish Airlines, flag carrier of Turkey, has been selected by Skytrax as Europe's best airline for five years in a row (2011–2015). With destinations in 129 countries worldwide, Turkish Airlines is the largest carrier in the world by number of countries served as of 2024.

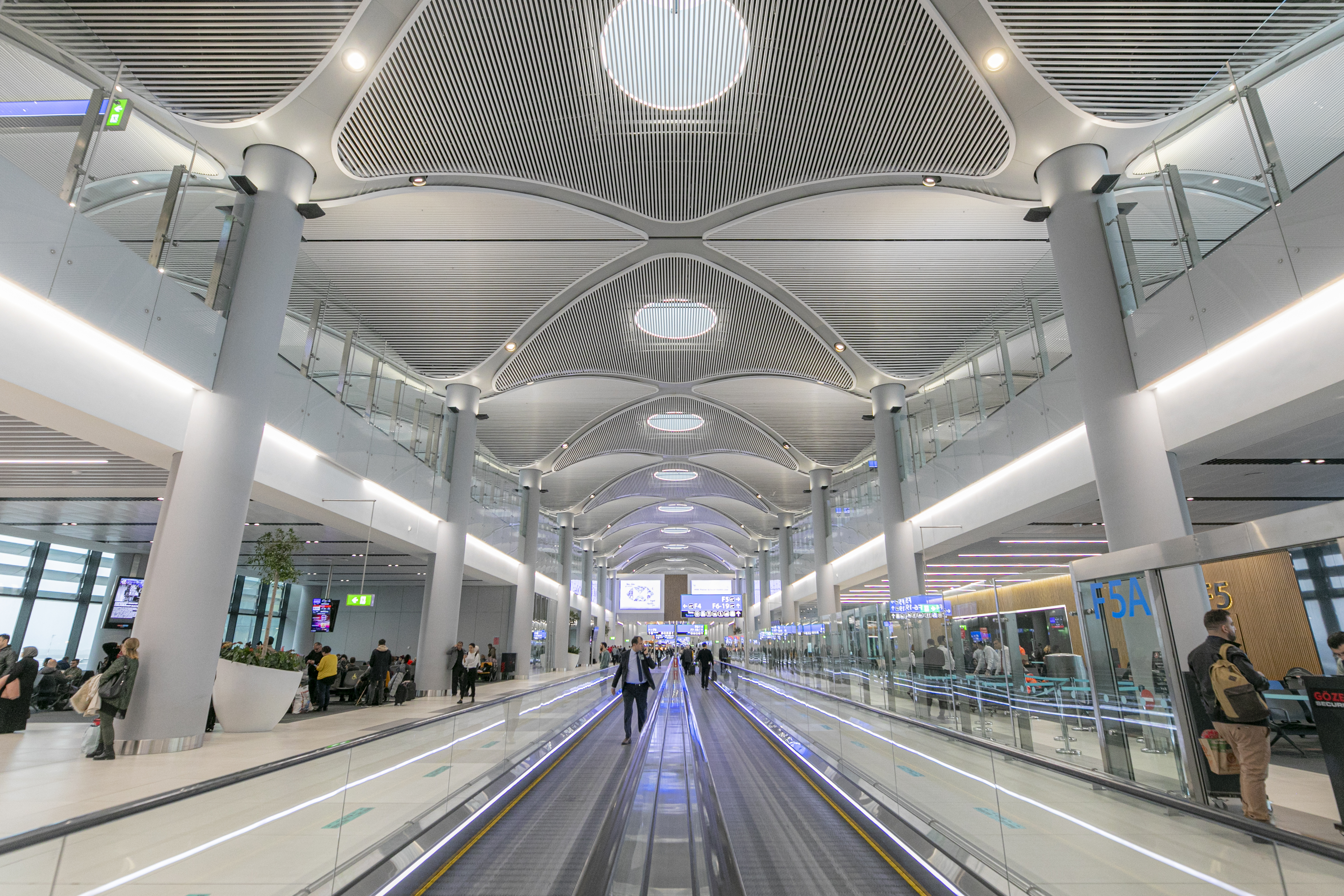
Istanbul Airport is the main international airport serving Istanbul, Turkey. It is a major hub in the world.

In 2013 there were 98 airports in Turkey, including 22 international airports. As of 2015, Istanbul Atatürk Airport was the 11th busiest airport in the world, serving 31,833,324 passengers between January and July 2014, according to Airports Council International. The new (third) international airport of Istanbul is planned to be the largest airport in the world, with a capacity to serve 150 million passengers per annum.

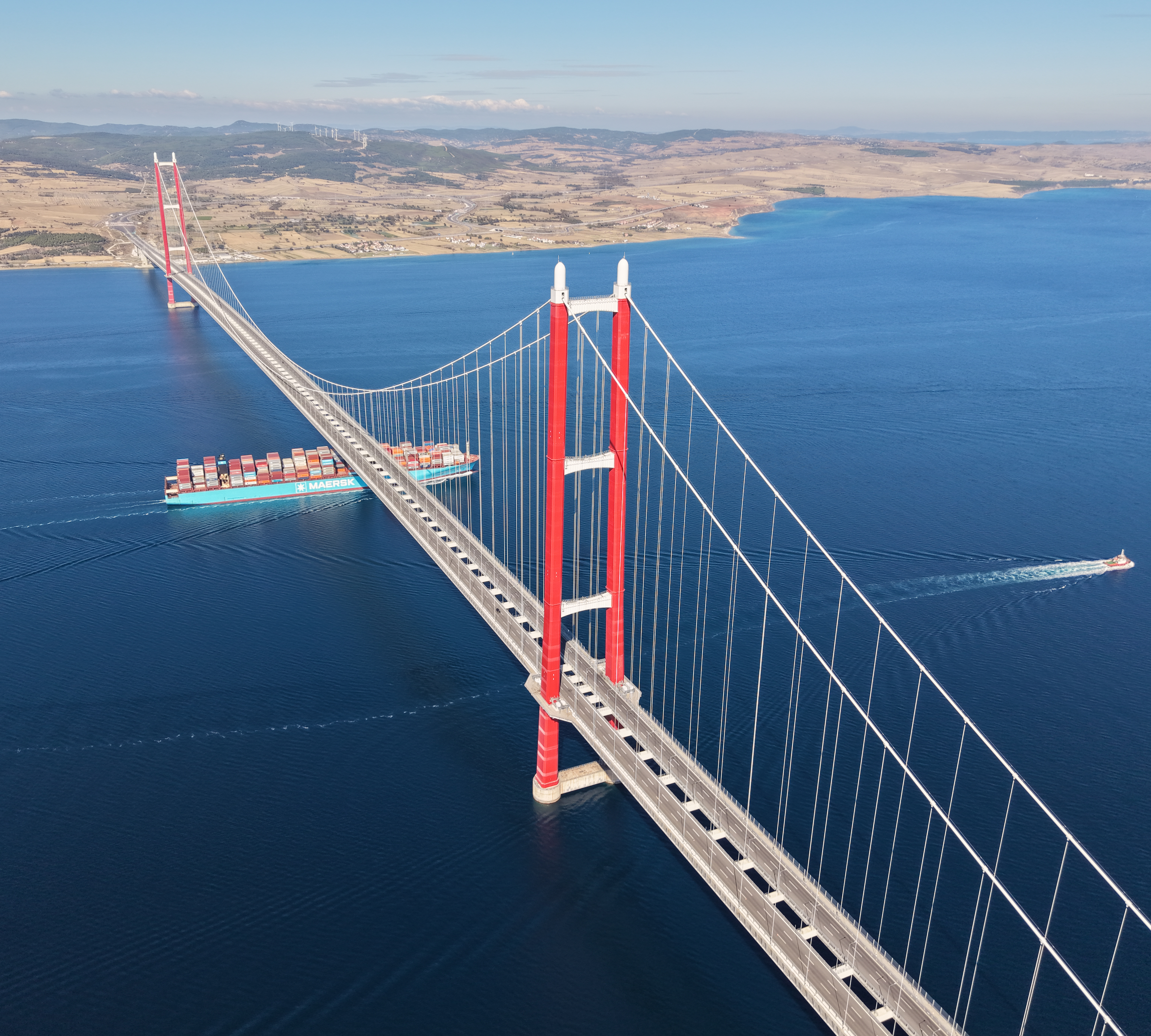
The 1915 Çanakkale Bridge on the Dardanelles strait, connecting Europe and Asia, is the longest suspension bridge in the world.

The state-owned utility Turkish State Railways operates the 12,740–km railway network, 23rd longest in the world. Since 2003, Turkish State Railways has also been investing in high-speed rail lines, which at 2,175 km (1,353 mi) ranked ninth longest in the world.

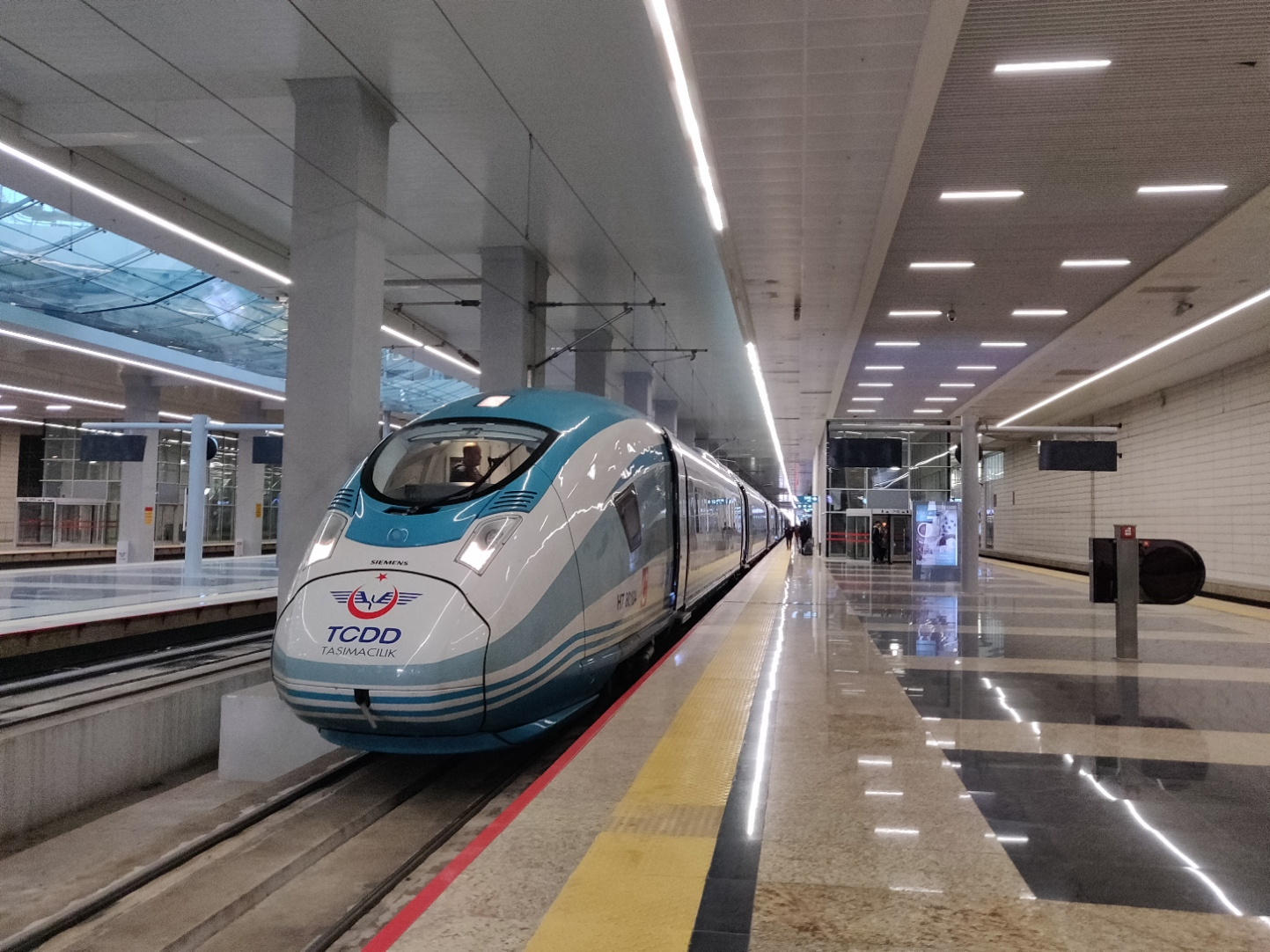
A TCDD HT80000 high-speed train of the Turkish State Railways at the ATG terminal in Ankara

As of 2010, the country had a roadway network of 426,951 km, including 2,080 km of expressways and 16,784 km of divided highways.

As of 2010, the Turkish merchant marine included 1,199 ships (604 registered at home), ranking 7th in the world. Turkey's coastline has 1,200 km of navigable waterways.

In 2008, 7,555 kilometres (4,694 mi) of natural gas pipelines and 3,636 kilometres (2,259 mi) of petroleum pipelines spanned the country's territory.

==== Tourism ====
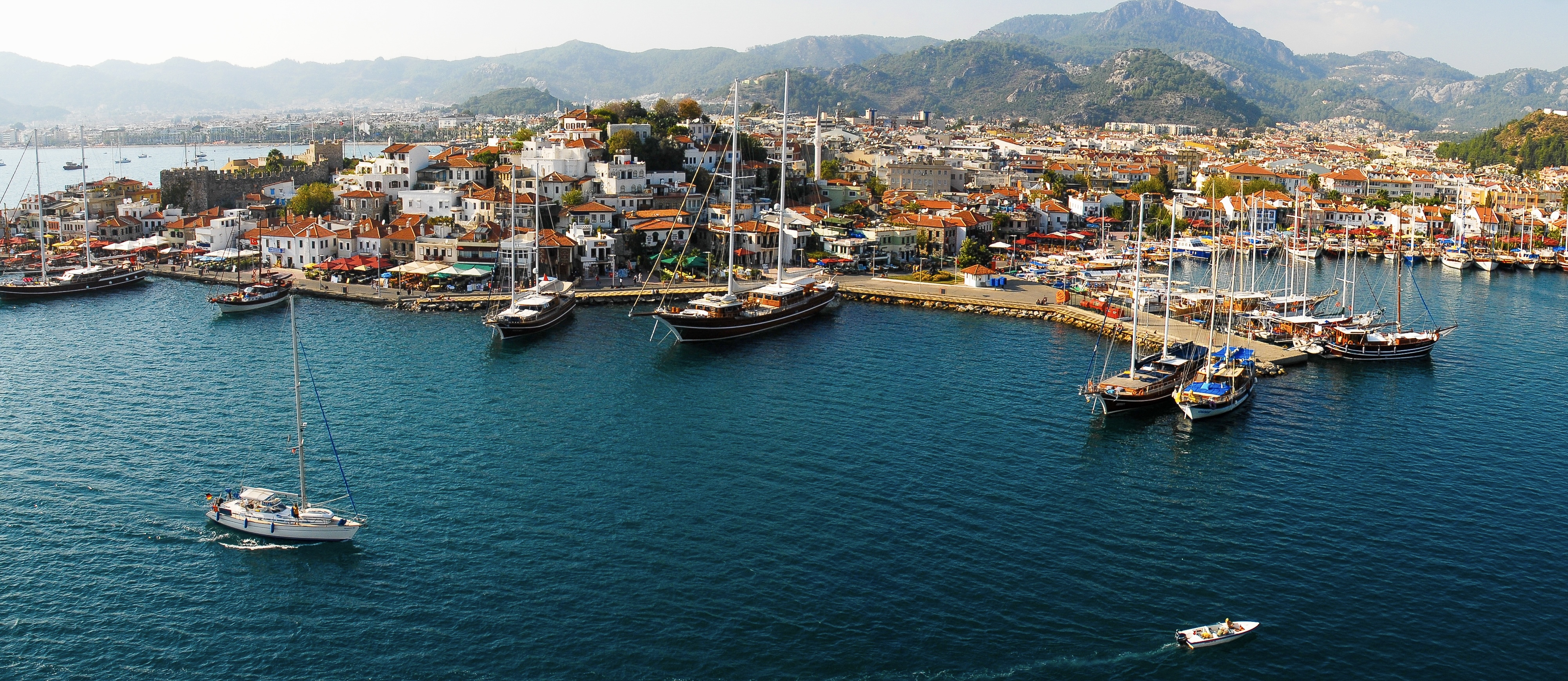
Marmaris in the Turkish Riviera

In 2023, Turkey was the fifth most visited destination in the world, with 55.2 million foreign tourists visiting the country. In 2019, Turkey ranked sixth in the world in terms of the number of international tourist arrivals, with 51.2 million foreign visitors.

Over the years, Turkey has emerged as a popular tourist destination for many Europeans, competing with other Mediterranean countries such as Greece, Italy and Spain. Resorts in provinces such as Antalya and Muğla (which are located on the Turkish Riviera) have become very popular among tourists.

===== Medical tourism =====
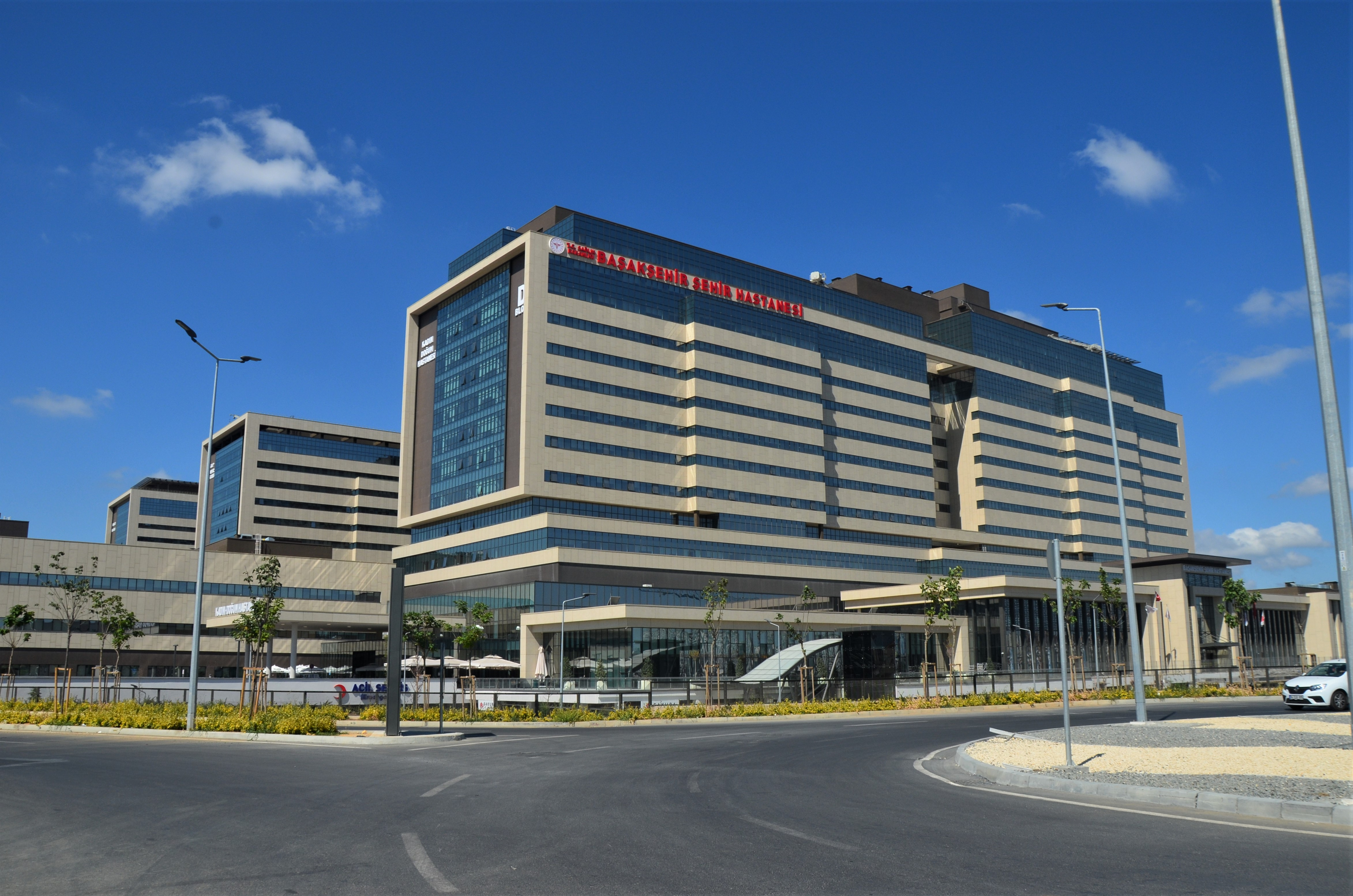
Başakşehir Çam and Sakura City Hospital in Istanbul

There are numerous private hospitals in Turkey, which has benefited from medical tourism in recent years. Health tourism generated revenues worth $1 billion in 2019 for Turkey's economy. A total of 662,087 patients were treated at Turkish hospitals in 2019 within the scope of health tourism, with around 60% of the income being obtained from plastic surgeries.

== Science and technology ==
Turkey boasts over 80 technoparks where around 6,000 national and multinational companies engage in R&D activities. TÜBİTAK is the leading agency for developing science, technology and innovation policies in Turkey. The Turkish Academy of Sciences is an autonomous scholarly society acting to promote scientific activities in Turkey. TAEK is the official nuclear energy institution of Turkey. Its objectives include academic research in nuclear energy, and the development and implementation of peaceful nuclear tools.

Turkish government companies for research and development in military technologies include Turkish Aerospace Industries, ASELSAN, HAVELSAN, ROKETSAN, MKE, among others. Turkish Satellite Assembly, Integration and Test Center is a spacecraft production and testing facility owned by the Ministry of National Defence and operated by the Turkish Aerospace Industries. The Turkish Space Launch System is a project to develop the satellite launch capability of Turkey. It consists of the construction of a spaceport, the development of satellite launch vehicles as well as the establishment of remote earth stations.

== Infrastructure ==
=== Energy ===
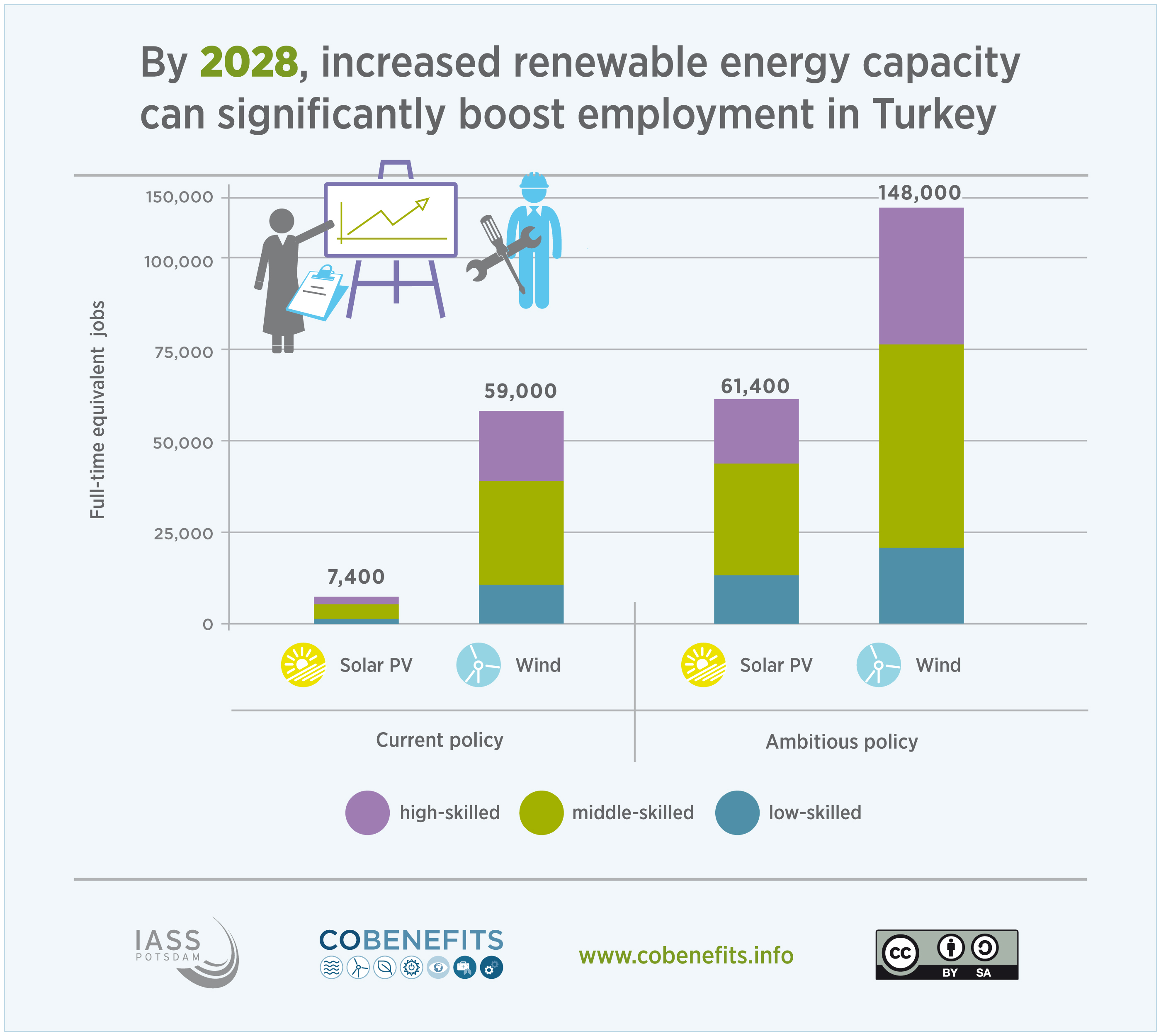
According to some studies, a coal-phase out in favour of renewable energy would increase employment.

Turkey's energy trade deficit was over US$80 billion in 2022, causing a large foreign trade deficit. Europe supports energy efficiency and renewable energy via the €1 billion Mid-size Sustainable Energy Financing Facility (MidSEFF) to finance investments in these areas. Energy subsidies amounted to 200 billion lira in 2021. Up to 150 kWh per month of free electricity is provided to two million poor families.

Fatih Birol, the head of the International Energy Agency said in 2019 that, because of its falling price, the focus should be on maximizing onshore wind power in Turkey. The economics of coal power has been modelled by Carbon Tracker. They estimate that for new plants both wind and solar is already cheaper than coal power. They forecast that existing coal plants will be more expensive than new solar by 2023 and new wind by 2027.

Most energy deals in 2019 were for renewables, and over half the investment in these was from outside the country. The external costs of fossil fuel consumption in 2018 has been estimated as 1.5% of GDP. The government sets the price of residential gas and electricity, and as of 2018, for residential consumers, "high cost is the most important problem of Turkey's energy system".

In 2022, the energy import bill was 97 billion USD. Keeping consumer prices low is a political priority. In 2024, Shura estimated the costs of moving to clean energy at about half the benefits, which are mostly due to reduced air pollution and carbon emissions.

==== Renewable energy ====
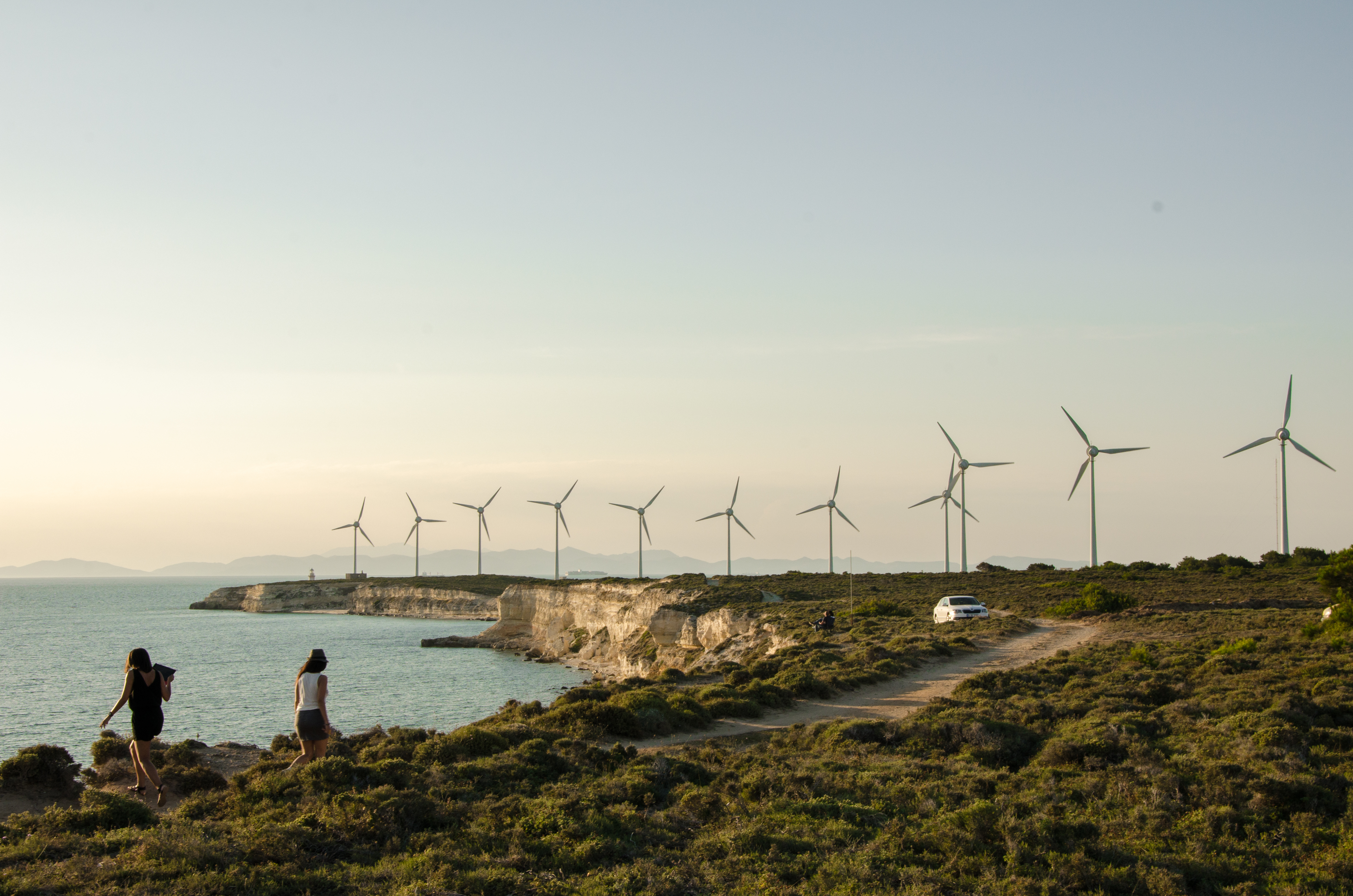
Wind turbines on the island of Bozcaada in the far west

Renewables supply a quarter of energy in Turkey, including heat and electricity. Hot water from underground warms many spas and greenhouses, and some houses have rooftop solar water heating. In parts of the west hot rocks are shallow enough to generate electricity as well as heat. Wind turbines, also mainly near western cities and industry, generate a tenth of Turkey’s electricity. Hydropower, mostly from dams in the east, is the only modern renewable energy which is fully exploited. Hydropower averages about a fifth of the country's electricity, but much less in drought years. Apart from wind and hydro, other renewables; such as geothermal, solar and biogas; together generated almost a tenth of Turkey’s electricity in 2022. Over half the installed capacity for electricity generation is renewables.

Turkey has a long history of wood burning, windmills, and bathing in hot springs. Many dams were built from the mid-20th to early 21st century, but some say that governments have not allowed civil society enough influence on energy policy, leading to protests against building dams, geothermal power plants, and at least one wind farm. Despite Turkey’s sunny climate solar power is underdeveloped. As the electricity system is already flexible increasing to 70% renewables is easily feasible.Solar power could be expanded more quickly if the electricity grid was improved faster and energy policy revised, especially by abolishing fossil fuel subsidies.

Many hybrid power plants are planned, and batteries are being integrated. Companies with a lot of renewables include the state electricity generation company (mainly hydro), Aydem, and Kalyon. If renewables could help phase-out coal by 2030, instead of by the national net zero greenhouse gas emissions target year of 2053, that would have significant health benefits and reduce inflation in Turkey. As of 2022 renewables are not sufficient to meet that target year. Various electric vehicles are being manufactured, which will use some of the increased renewable generation and help reduce air pollution. As of 2024, renewables made up 44% of Turkey's electrical power production, consisting of 22% hydro, 8% solar, 11% wind, and 3% other. They are important for the country’s energy security.

=== Electrical ===
Turkey uses more electricity per person than the global average, but less than the European average, with demand peaking in summer due to air conditioning. Most electricity is generated from coal, gas and hydropower, with hydroelectricity from the east transmitted to big cities in the west. Electricity prices are state-controlled, but wholesale prices are heavily influenced by the cost of imported gas.

Each year, over 300 terawatt-hours (TWh) of electricity is used, which is almost a quarter of the total energy used in Turkey. On average, about four hundred grams of carbon dioxide is emitted per kilowatt-hour of electricity generated (400 gCO_{2}/kWh); this carbon intensity is slightly less than the global average. As there is 100 GW of generating capacity, far more electricity could be produced. Although only a tiny proportion is exported; consumption is forecast to increase, and there are plans for more exports during the 2020s.

Turkey's coal-fired power stations are the largest source of the country's greenhouse-gas emissions. Many brown coal power stations are subsidized, which increases air pollution. Imports of gas, mostly for Turkey's power stations, are one of the main expenses for the country. In winter, electricity generation is vulnerable to reductions in the gas supply from other countries. Solar and wind power are now the cheapest generators of electricity, and more of both are being built. If enough solar and wind power is built, the country's hydroelectric plants should be enough to cover windless cloudy weeks.

Renewables generate a third of the country's electricity, and academics have suggested that the target of 32% renewable energy by 2030 be increased to 50%, and that coal power should be phased out by the mid-2030s. Increased use of electric vehicles is expected to increase electricity demand. Modernizing the grid is important for the country’s energy security. 36% electrification is targeted for 2040.

=== Water supply and sanitation ===
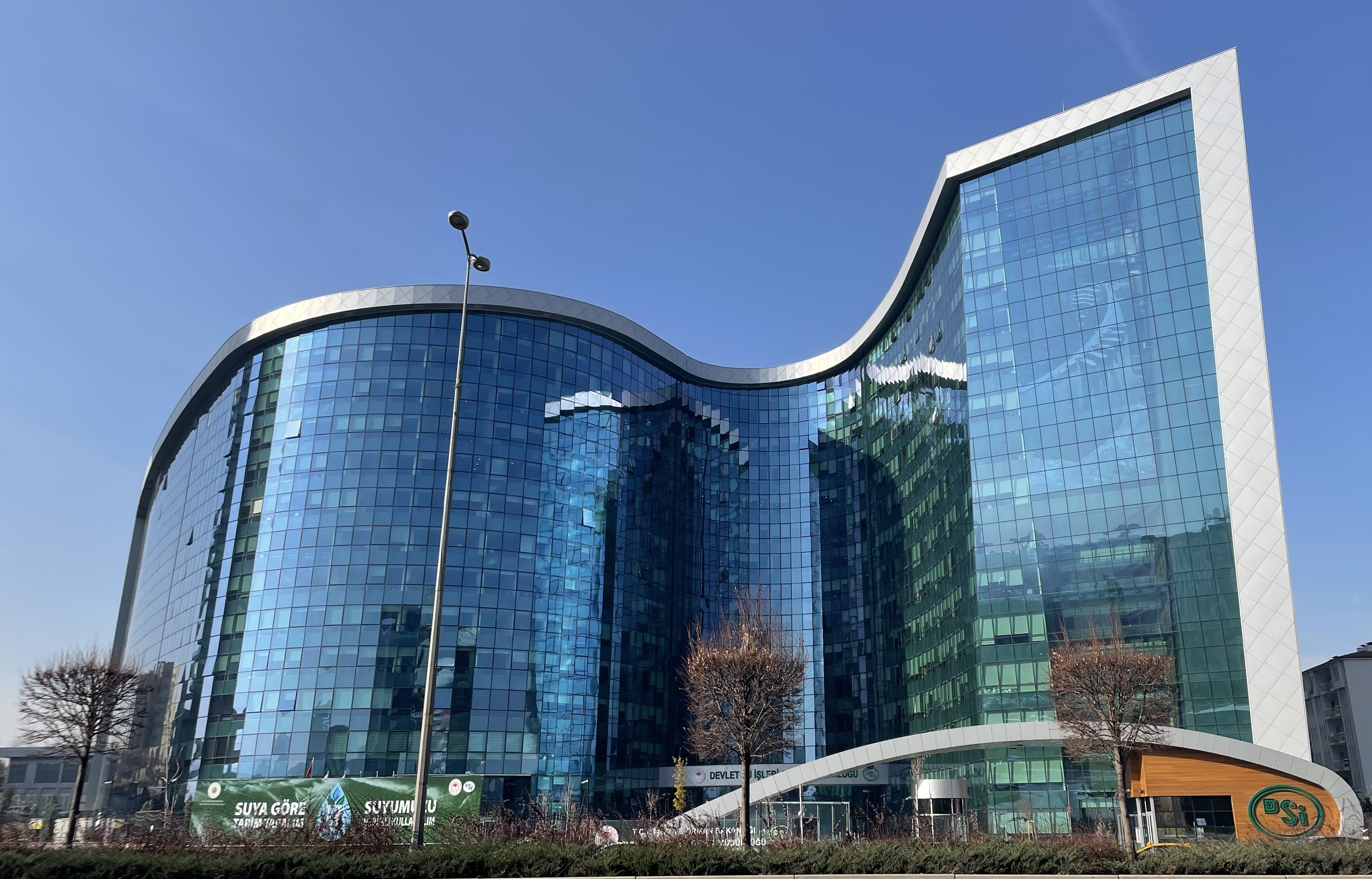
State Hydraulic Works Headquarters

Tap water is drinkable in some parts of Turkey. Water supply in the country is stressed and may become scarce by the 2030s, with most of the country vulnerable to desertification.

Both sit and squat toilets usually have integrated or add-on bidets, and almost all mosques have public toilets. However sewage is not always properly treated before being discharged, and this is one of the causes of pollution of the seas.

Water supply and sanitation in Turkey is characterized by achievements and challenges. Over the past decades access to drinking water has become almost universal and access to adequate sanitation has also increased substantially. Autonomous utilities have been created in the 16 metropolitan cities of Turkey and cost recovery has been increased, thus providing the basis for the sustainability of service provision. Intermittent supply, which was common in many cities, has become less frequent.

Turkey has between 2,500 and 1,350 cubic metres of water available per person per year, but this varies a lot by region, with some areas short such as water supply and sanitation in Istanbul, partly due to urbanisation and climate change in Turkey. Over three-quarters of the freshwater used is by agriculture, and charging for it has been suggested.

Remaining challenges include the need to further increase wastewater treatment, to reduce the high level of non-revenue water hovering around 50% and to expand access to adequate sanitation in rural areas. Turkey is aiming for good water status under the EU Water Framework Directive by 2027.

There is a water management plan to 2028. Institutionally the sector is fragmented. Policy, regulatory and planning functions are dispersed between five Ministries, the State Hydraulic Works (DSI) and the State Planning Organization under the Prime Minister's Office. Service provision is the responsibility of about 2,400 municipalities and 16 utilities in the largest cities. External cooperation has played and continues to play a major role for water and sanitation in Turkey. Germany, France, the European Union and the World Bank are the major external partners.

== Largest companies ==
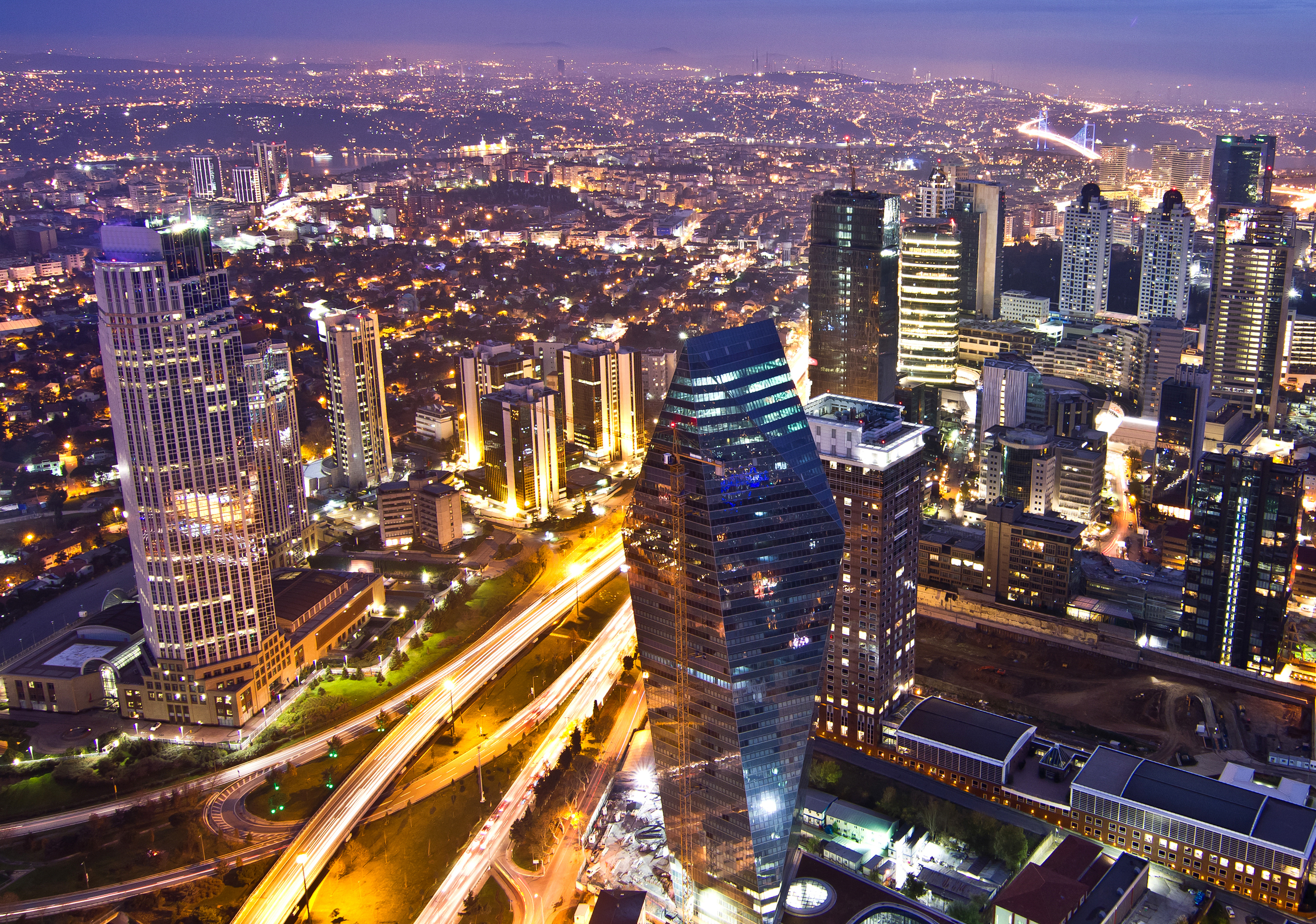
Levent business district on the European side of Istanbul

In 2025, ten publicly traded Turkish companies were listed in the Forbes Global 2000 list – an annual ranking of the top 2000 public companies in the world by Forbes magazine.

The banking industry leads with four companies in the list, followed by the airline, automotive and retailer industries with one company each. There are also three conglomerates.

As of 2025, the listed public companies were:

World rank	Company	Industry	Revenue (billion $)	Profits (billion $)	Assets (billion $)	Market Value (billion $)
616	Turkish Airlines	Airline	22.68	3.45	39.58	11.37
685	VakıfBank	Banking	24.85	1.5	115.77	5.49
700	İş Bankası	Banking	25.37	1.39	109.18	6.97
793	Akbank	Banking	18.52	1.29	75.03	6.97
837	Koç Holding	Conglomerate	66.63	0.03	110.52	9.6
885	Halkbank	Banking	22.24	0.67	88.91	3.73
1027	Sabancı Holding	Conglomerate	26.81	-0.43	86.92	4.23
1215	Ford Otosan	Automotive industry	17.13	1.12	9.24	8.48
1737	BIM	Retailer	14.94	0.53	6.67	7.22
1870	Anadolu Grubu	Conglomerate	16.21	0.14	15.38	1.81

== Long-term GDP forecasts ==
The following "OECD Long Term Projections" table was published in February 2022 for the 16 largest economies by GDP using PPP exchange rates from 2030 to 2060.

The top 16 largest economies in the world (GDP at 2010 constant PPP in billions USD)
Country	2021	Country	2030	Country	2040	Country	2050	Country	2060
China	26,656	China	36,977	China	47,306	China	54,765	China	62,140
United States	22,675	United States	24,302	United States	28,063	India	33,363	India	42,204
India	10,181	India	16,603	India	25,083	United States	32,119	United States	36,527
Japan	5,585	Japan	5,632	Indonesia	7,507	Indonesia	9,846	Indonesia	12,320
Germany	4,743	Indonesia	5,309	Japan	5,908	Japan	6,060	Turkey	7,068
Russia	4,328	Germany	4,566	Germany	4,914	Turkey	5,934	Japan	6,333
Indonesia	3,507	Russia	4,233	Turkey	4,776	Germany	5,362	Germany	5,891
Brazil	3,328	Brazil	3,759	Russia	4,624	Brazil	5,168	Brazil	5,746
France	3,231	Turkey	3,653	Brazil	4,492	Russia	4,882	Mexico	5,407
United Kingdom	3,174	United Kingdom	3,375	Mexico	3,832	Mexico	4,620	Russia	5,340
Turkey	2,749	France	3,267	United Kingdom	3,800	United Kingdom	4,249	United Kingdom	4,768
Mexico	2,613	Mexico	3,073	France	3,679	France	4,148	France	4,736
Italy	2,610	South Korea	2,675	South Korea	2,866	Italy	2,959	Italy	3,366
South Korea	2,436	Italy	2,499	Italy	2,692	South Korea	2,880	Australia	3,104
Canada	2,027	Spain	2,094	Canada	2,370	Saudi Arabia	2,698	Saudi Arabia	3,066
Spain	1,959	Canada	2,062	Saudi Arabia	2,362	Canada	2,694	Canada	3,046

== External trade and investment ==
Exports of Turkey by product category (2019) Chemical products Transportation Machines Mineral products Plastics and rubbers Metals Foodstuffs Precious metals Textiles Instruments Animal products Vegetable products Paper goods Footwear and headwear Miscellaneous Stone and glass Wood products Animal and vegetable bi-products Animal hides Arts and antiques Weapons

As of 2016, the main trading partners of Turkey are the European Union, Russia, the United Kingdom, the UAE, Iraq, and China, many being top in both export as well as import. Turkey has taken advantage of a customs union with the EU, signed in 1995, to increase industrial production for exports, while benefiting from EU-origin foreign investment into the country. In addition to the European-Turkish Customs Union, the Turkish government has signed free-trade agreements with 22 countries.

A very large aspect of Turkey trade revolves around the automotive industry, where its top exports are cars, accounting for $13.2 billion. Other top exports from the country are gold, delivery trucks, vehicle parts and jewelry, which are respectively, $6.96 billion, $5.04 billion, $4.64 billion, and $3.39 billion. These values are calculated using the 1992 revision of the Harmonized System classification. Comparatively, it imports many of the same industries, such as, gold valued at $17.1 billion, refined petroleum at $9.8 billion, cars at $8.78 billion, vehicle parts at $6.34 billion and scrap iron at $5.84 billion.

The construction and contracting companies, such as Enka, Rönesans Holding and Tekfen, have been significant players in the country's economy. The Turkish emissions trading system is a response to the EU Carbon Border Adjustment Mechanism but is handicapped by technological lock-in - for example coal power plants built in the 2010s. The Turkish ETS regulation entered into force in August 2026.

Turkey had many improvements in the ease of doing business index. Its rank increased from 68th in 2017 to 33rd in 2020. As of 2021, it was performing better than countries like the Netherlands and Belgium.

Trade statistics
Year	1975	1980	1985	1990	1995	2000	2005	2010	2015	2020	2023
Goods exports, billion US$	1.5	2.9	8.3	13.0	22.0	30.9	78.5	121.0	154.9	168.4	251.0
Goods imports, billion US$	4.5	7.5	11.2	22.5	35.1	52.9	111.4	177.3	203.9	206.3	337.3
Net trade, billion US$	−3.0	−4.6	−2.9	−9.5	−13.1	−22.0	−32.9	−56.3	−49.0	−37.9	−86.3

== Natural resources ==
=== Fossil fuels ===
The Right to Clean Air Platform has estimated that the lack of a legal limit on fine particulate air pollution has cost the economy 10% of GDP in 2024.

==== Gas ====
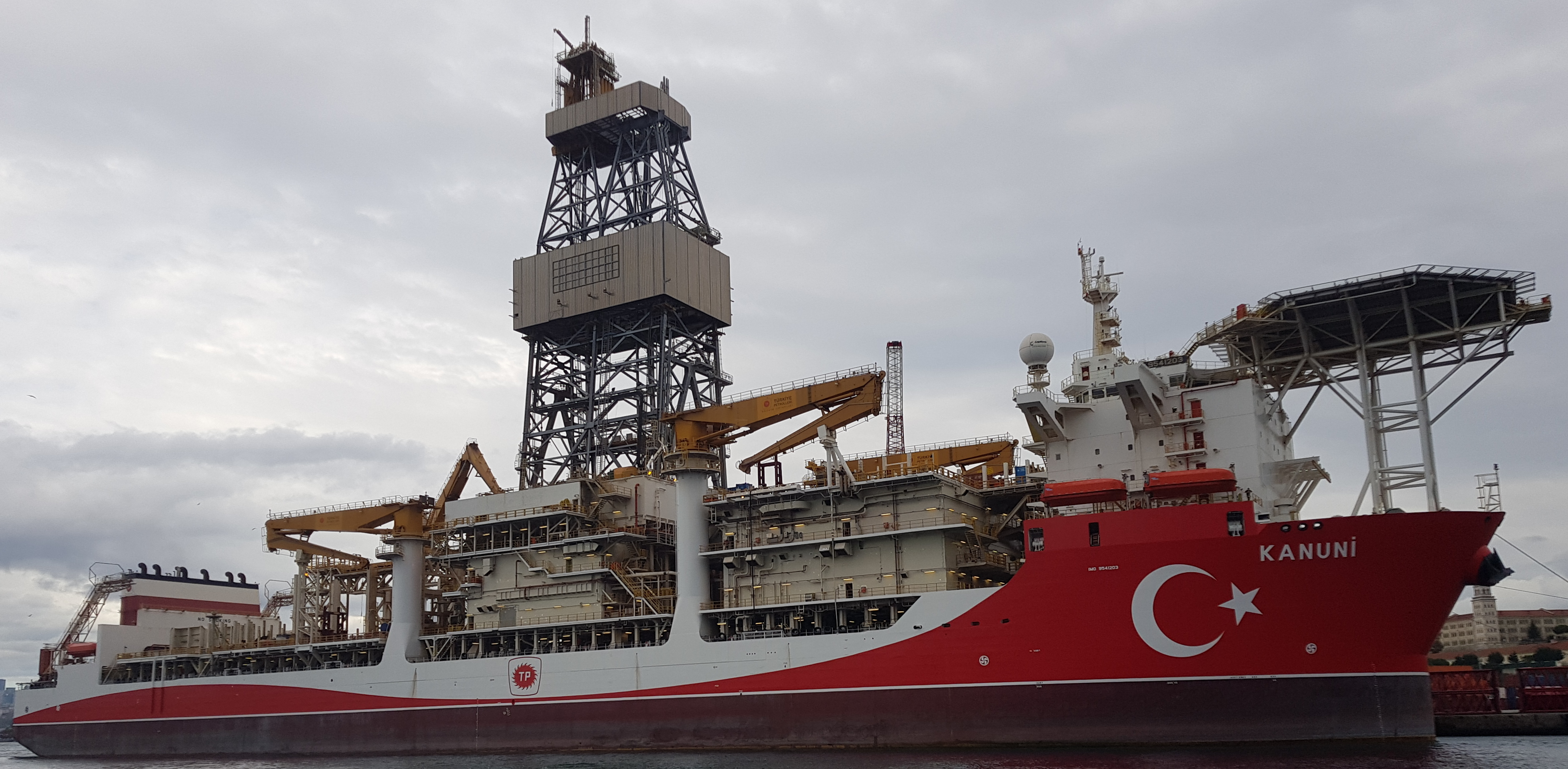
The Kanuni has drilled in the Black Sea.

Natural gas supplies over a quarter of Turkey's energy. The country consumes 50 to 60 billion cubic metres of natural gas each year, nearly all of which is imported. A large gas field in the Black Sea started production in 2023.

After the 2022 Russian invasion of Ukraine several European countries stopped buying Russian oil or gas, but Turkey's relations with Russia are good enough that it continues to buy both. Turkey receives much gas from Russia, which is cheaper than LNG. Households buy the most gas, followed by industry and power stations. Over 80% of the population has access to gas, and it supplies half the country's heating requirements. As the state-owned oil and gas wholesaler BOTAŞ has 80% of the gas market, the government can and does subsidize residential and industrial gas consumers. All industrial and commercial customers, and households using more than a certain amount of gas, can switch suppliers.

==== Oil ====
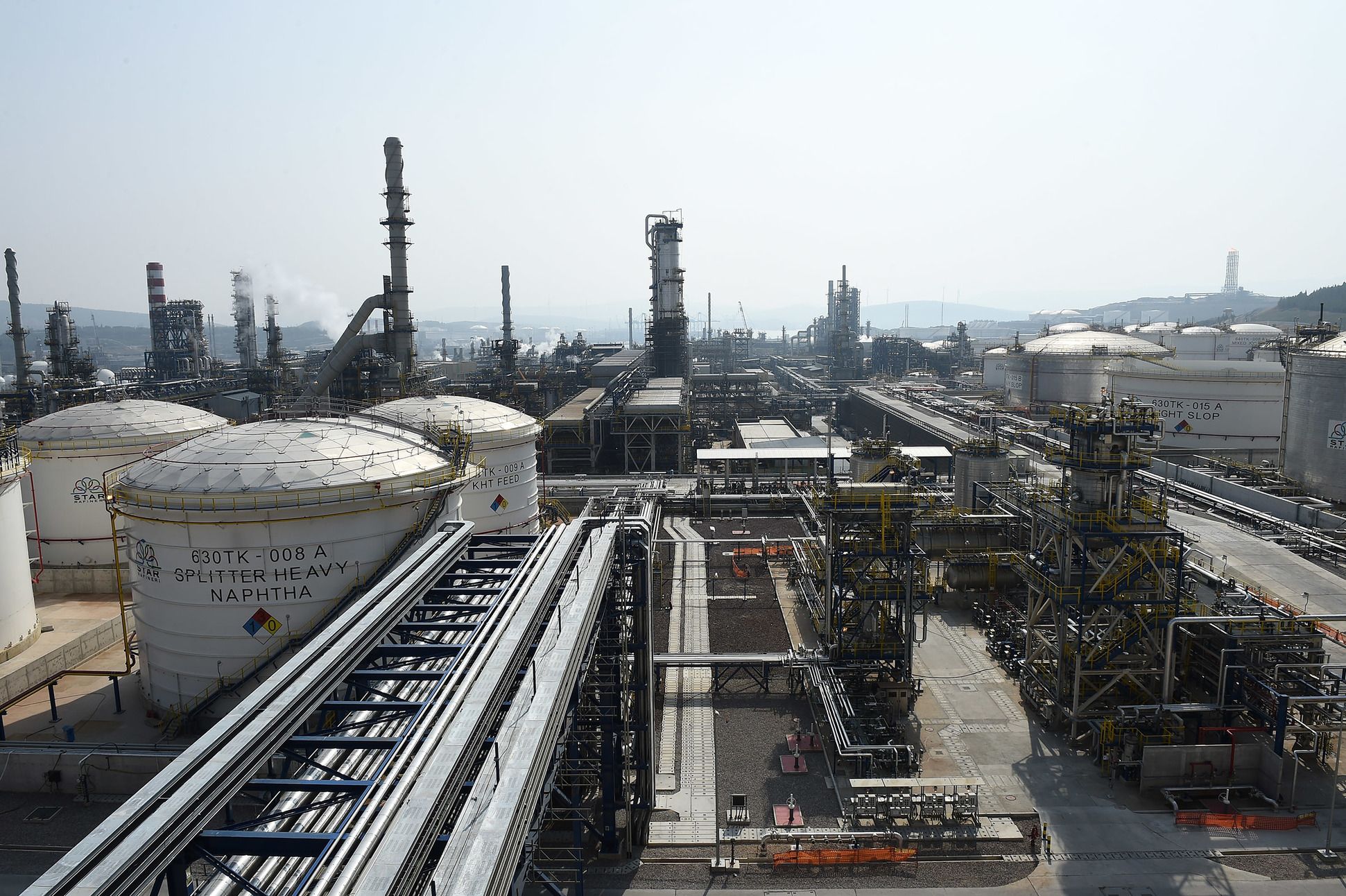
The Star Aegean refinery in İzmir belongs to SOCAR (the state-owned oil company of Azerbaijan), and produces mostly diesel from Azeri oil.

Oil supplies over a quarter of Turkey's energy. The country consumes about a million barrels a day. Because the country produces little oil, it depends on imports of crude oil and diesel. Over half of oil is burnt in the country's road vehicles. Turkey is one of the world's largest users of liquefied petroleum gas, mainly as autogas.

Because Turkey produces only 15% of the crude oil it consumes, the country's total imports are worth more than its exports, which is a problem for its economy. After the 2022 Russian invasion of Ukraine, several European countries stopped buying Russian oil, but Turkey's relations with Russia are such that it supplied most oil imports in 2025, and diesel imports continue.

Exhaust from diesel-fuelled lorries pollutes roads with nitrogen dioxide, carbon monoxide and soot.

==== Coal ====
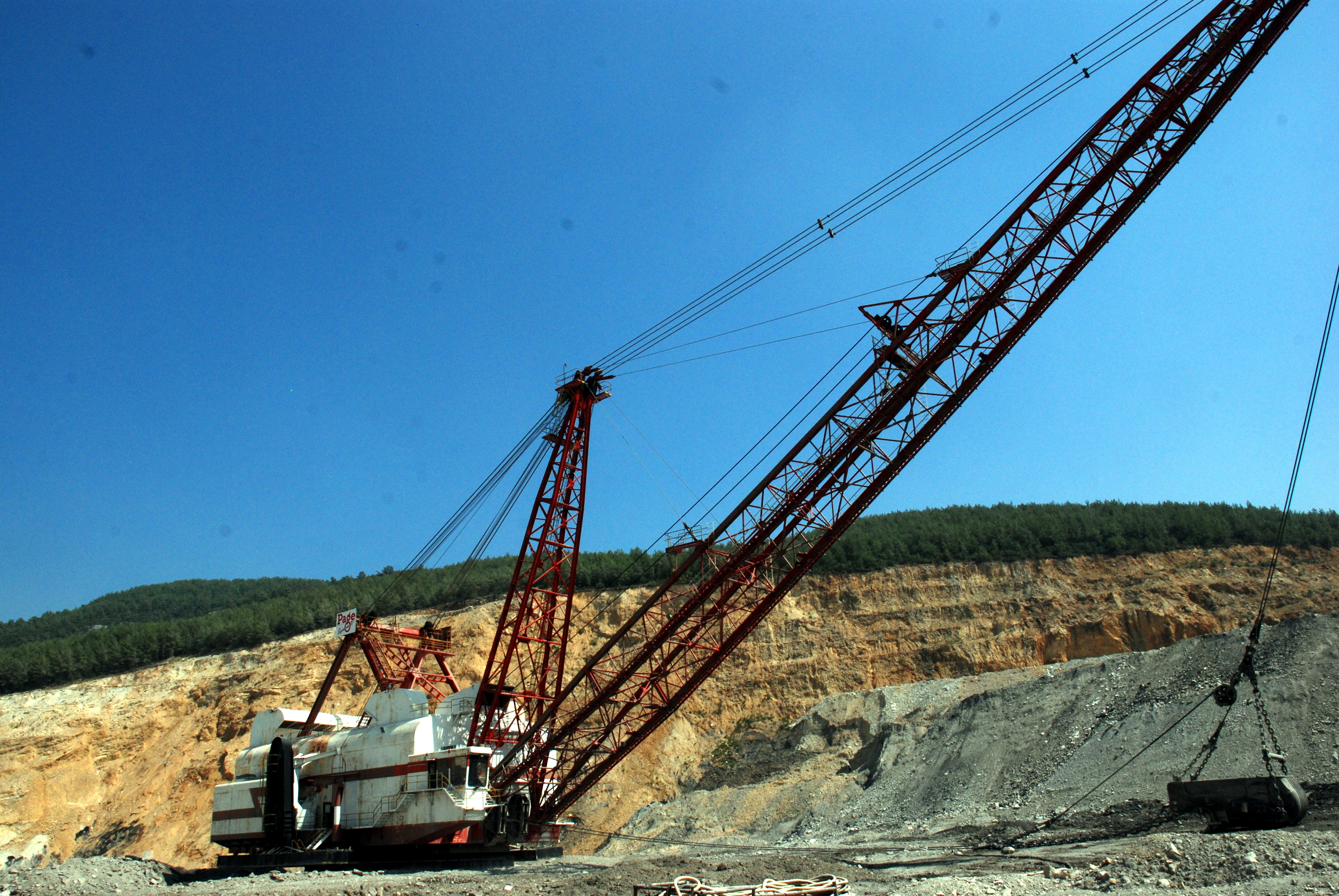
Government-owned Turkish Coal Operations Authority mine in Yeniköy, Milas

Coal supplies a quarter of Turkey's primary energy, and the country is one of the largest consumers in the world. The subsidised coal industry generates a third of the country's electricity and emits over a quarter of Turkey's greenhouse gases.

Coal is a major contributor to air pollution, and damages health across the nation, being burnt even in homes and cities. Most coal is burnt in power stations, and it is estimated that a phase out of coal power in Turkey by 2030 instead of by the 2050s would save over 100 thousand lives. Flue gas emission limits are in place, but data from mandatory reporting is not made public.

Over 90% of coal mined in Turkey is lignite (brown coal), which is more polluting than other types of coal. Turkey's energy policy encourages mining lignite for coal-fired power stations in order to reduce gas imports; and coal supplies over 40% of domestic energy production. Coal burning peaked in 2018, and mining in 2022 at about 100 million tonnes. Most coal is imported, as in contrast to local lignite production, Turkey imports most of its bituminous coal from Russia. The largest coalfield in Turkey is Elbistan. Turkey will host the 2026 United Nations Climate Change Conference, in which getting agreement on coal phase-out will be very important.

=== Minerals ===
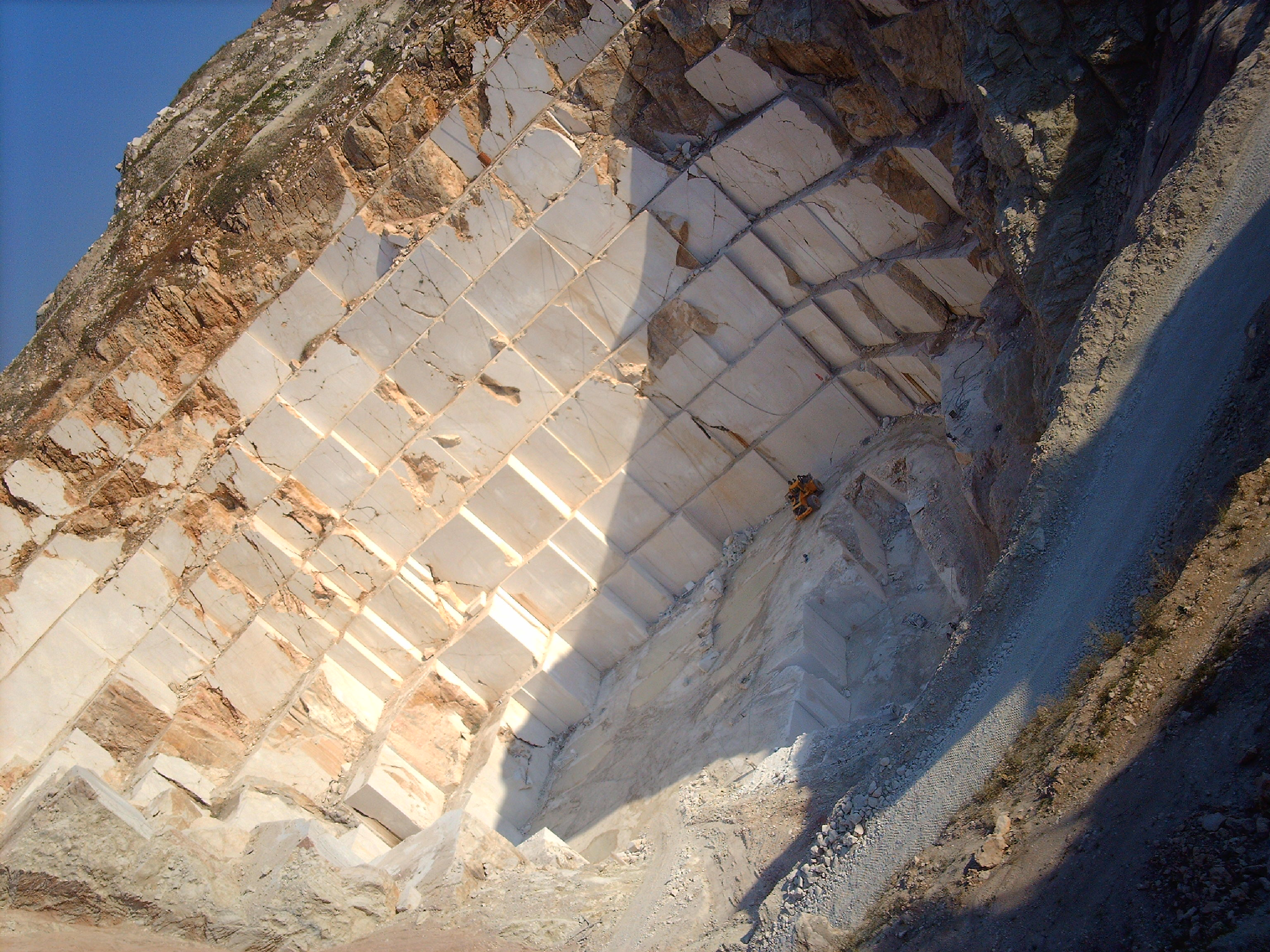
Marble quarries in Turkey

In 2019, the country was the world's 2nd largest producer of chromium; the largest producer of boron; 6th largest producer of antimony; 9th largest producer of lead; 13th largest producer of iron ore; 11th largest producer of molybdenum; 4th largest producer of gypsum; 15th largest producer of graphite; in addition to being the 11th largest producer of salt.

As a gold producer Turkey is currently ranked 22nd globally. Hosting some of the largest gold deposits on the European continent it is currently Europe's largest gold producer, producing 42 tonnes of gold in 2020. World class deposits include Kisladag Mine 17Moz and Copler 10Moz.

== Employment and labor ==
The minimum wage in Turkey is ₺ 28,075 (US$ 652.41) as of 1 January 2025. In 2022 the daily median income was US$19.94 (PPP).

TurkStat estimated unemployment at 9.4% in 2023. The province with the highest unemployment rate was Hakkari at 23.3% and the province with the lowest unemployment rate was Sinop at 4.8%.

In 2021, trade unions complained that according to TurkStat data the unemployment rate was falling, whereas the data provided by the government's Employment Agency (İŞKUR) showed that it was rising. Environmentalists argue that some actions to improve the environment would also benefit the economy. For example, investing in wind power in Turkey and solar power in Turkey would create jobs and is competitive with fossil fuels.

== Poverty ==
Turkey made steady progress in reducing poverty from the early 2000s to the mid-2010s, after which the trend levelled off. In 2022, social security expenditure stood at 12.4% of GDP according to OECD data.

== Regional disparities ==
According to Eurostat data, Turkish GDP per capita adjusted by purchasing power standards stood at 64 percent of the EU average in 2018. Istanbul has the largest GDP, while Kocaeli comes first in GDP per capita.

The country's wealth is mainly concentrated in the northwest and west, while the east and southeast suffer from poverty, lower economic production and higher levels of unemployment. However, in line with the rapid growth of Turkey's GDP during the first two decades of the 21st century (with brief periods of stagnation and recession), parts of Anatolia began reaching a higher economic standard. These cities are known as the Anatolian Tigers.

=== Richest and poorest NUTS-2 regions (GDP PPP 2022) ===
	Region	GDP per capita 2022	
	Region	in euros	As % of EU-28 average
Turkey		23,800	67%
Richest	Istanbul	38,700	109%
	Kocaeli	31,500	89%
	Ankara	31,100	88%
	Tekirdağ	29,700	84%
	Izmir	29,500	83%
	Bursa	25,700	73%
	Antalya	23,900	68%
	Balıkesir	21,600	61%
	Aydın	20,900	59%
	Manisa	20,000	56%
	Adana	20,000	56%
	Konya	19,100	54%
	Zonguldak	18,700	53%
	Kırıkkale	17,700	50%
	Kayseri	17,500	49%
	Gaziantep	17,400	49%
	Kastamonu	16,700	47%
	Hatay	15,700	44%
	Samsun	14,000	39%
	Erzurum	13,900	39%
	Trabzon	13,200	37%
	Malatya	12,900	37%
	Mardin	12,200	34%
	Ağrı	9,800	28%
	Şanlıurfa	9,100	26%
Poorest	Van	8,600	24%

Source: Eurostat – ESA

=== Richest and poorest NUTS-1 regions (GDP PPP 2022) ===
	Region	GDP per capita 2022	
	Region	in euros	As % of EU-28 average
Turkey		23,800	67%
Richest	Istanbul	38,700	109%
	East Marmara	28,600	81%
	West Anatolia	27,400	77%
	West Marmara	25,800	73%
	Aegean	24,200	68%
	Mediterranean	19,900	56%
	Central Anatolia	17,600	50%
	West Black Sea	15,500	44%
	East Black Sea	13,200	37%
	Southeast Anatolia	12,500	35%
	Northeast Anatolia	11,800	33%
Poorest	Central East Anatolia	10,500	30%

Source: Eurostat – ESA

== Environment ==
Almost all "post-COVID" stimulus was detrimental to the environment, with Russia being the only worse country. In the 21st century, Turkey's fossil fuel subsidies are around 0.2% of GDP, including at least US$14 billion (US$169 per person) between January 2020 and September 2021. Data on finance for fossil fuels by state-owned banks and export credit agencies is not public. As of 2023 fossil gas is subsidized more than electricity - equalizing the subsidies would benefit the environment.

== See also ==
- List of companies of Turkey
- List of companies listed on the Borsa Istanbul
- List of Turkish people by net worth
- List of Turkish provinces by GDP
- Anatolian Tigers
- Capital Markets Board of Turkey
- Central Bank of the Republic of Turkey
- Copyright law of Turkey
- Corruption in Turkey
- Economy of Ankara
- Economy of Istanbul
- European Union–Turkey Customs Union
- Ministry of Treasury and Finance
- Public Oversight, Accounting and Auditing Standards Authority
- Privatization Board of Turkey
- Southeastern Anatolia Project
- Taxation in Turkey
- Turkey and the World Bank
- Turkey Wealth Fund
- Turkish Revenue Administration
- U.S.-Turkey Business Council
- Economy of the Middle East
- Economy of Asia
- Economy of Europe
