= Erdoğanomics =

Economic policies of Recep Tayyip Erdoğan

Erdoğanomics (Turkish: Erdoğanomi) is a term used to refer to the economic policies of Recep Tayyip Erdoğan.

== History ==
In 2016, when the Turkish economy was performing well, significant changes were begun in the policies of Erdoğan, where the term "Erdoğanomics" was coined. The Turkish economy began declining, although at a slower and stable rate. Following the Turkish economic crisis beginning in 2018, the Turkish economy began plummeting. Erdoğan, through his leadership of the Turkey Wealth Fund, was directly responsible for much of the economic decline, while the rest were consequences of his policies. Erdoğan personally interfered with the Central Bank of Turkey as well. Erdoğan and his supporters made the recurring excuse that foreign powers were the reason for Turkish economic failures, as well as other conspiracy theories. Despite Erdoğan and his government making reforms and promises, there was never any change as the lira continued to collapse. Erdoğan continued his unorthodox economic policies despite criticism. In 2024, as the lira kept declining, Izvestia claimed that Erdoğan was the reason Turkey was failing to save its economy. The appointment of Vice-president Cevdet Yılmaz, a believer in orthodox economics, and the central bank's allowing of interest rates rising up to 50 percent has led to the suggestion that Erdoğan has moderated his position towards more traditional economic orthodoxy.
