= Taxation in Turkey =

Taxation is an important part in the Turkish economy. Turkey has a 41.65% tax to GDP ratio (in 2021). Most of the taxes are levied by central government. However some specific taxes are levied by municipalities, with the amount determined by centrally issued legislation. Municipalities have no authority to make their own tax laws.

== Tax Procedure Law ==
Taxation system in Turkey is regulated by the Tax Procedure (TP) Law. It regulates the rights, burdens, carrying out duties along with principals of accrual. This law consist of procedural and official provisions of all tax laws. The TP has five main sections: taxation, taxpayer duties, valuation, penalty provisions and tax cases.

== Taxes ==
The Turkish tax legislation can be divided into three main categories:

1. Income taxes
2. Taxes on expenditure
3. Taxes on wealth

=== Income taxes ===
The Turkish tax legislation has two types of income taxes, the individual income tax and corporate income tax. Many rules and provisions are the same for individual income tax and corporations, especially in terms of income elements and the determination of net income. However the individual income tax and corporate income tax are regulated by different laws.

==== Individual income tax ====
The subject of individual income tax is the real people. The meaning of income is the net amount of revenues derived by a person within a year. According to Income Tax Law, incomes may be listed such as:

- Business profits
- Agricultural profits
- Salaries and wages
- Income from independent personal services
- Income from immovable property and rights (rental income)
- Income from movable property (income from capital investment)
- Other income and earnings

Variety of individual income tax rate is between 15% and 35%.

Residency criterion is the key point for the taxes. Residents in Turkey are liable at tax on their worldwide income and they are considered as "full tax liable". Non-residents are only subject to taxes on their revenues gained in Turkey and they are considered as "limited tax liable". Residents are individuals with legal permanent residence and those who reside in Turkey for more than six months during one year.

==== Corporate income taxes ====
If the income elements listed in the Income Tax Law are derived by corporations, taxation is enforceable on the legal entities of these corporations. Corporate taxpayers has been described as:

- Capital companies
- Cooperatives
- Public economic enterprises
- Economic enterprises owned by associations and foundations
- Joint ventures

If the legal headquarters or effective management of corporations are located in Turkey, they are subject to taxes derived from world-wide business. They are also called as resident companies.

=== Taxes on expenditure ===
==== Value Added Tax (VAT) ====
Generally, the VAT rate varies from 1%, 8% to 18%. There is a huge range of subject subject to VAT such as industrial, commercial, agricultural, independent professional goods and services.

People who has to pay VAT are described as:

- Those supplying goods and services,
- Those importing goods or services,
- Those required to complete customs formalities in case of transit of goods through Turkey,
- General Directorates of Postal Services (PT and Telecom) and radio and television corporations,
- Organizers of any kind of chance and gambling,
- Organizers of shows, concerts and sporting events with the participation of professional artists and professional sportsmen,
- Lessors of goods and rights stated in Article 70 of the PIT Law,
- Applicants for optional tax liability
- VAT is also taken from Special Consumption Tax (SCT) where SCT is applied (taxation of tax)

==== Special Consumption Tax (SCT) ====
The goods which are subject to SCT is on the list below. For these products, the Special Consumption Tax is collected only once. Generally 4 product groups are subject to SCT at different rates:

- Petroleum products
- Automobiles and other vehicles
- Tobacco and tobacco products, alcoholic beverages
- Luxury products
  - Household appliances (washing machines, dishwashers, etc.), cellular phones and gaming consoles are considered luxury products

==== Banking and Insurance Transaction Tax ====
The transactions and services performed by banks and insurance companies are subject to this tax. This tax is paid by banks, bankers and insurance companies, regardless of the nature of the transaction, they are all subject to BITT. Taxes are levied on the money they collect as interest, commission and expenditure. Bankers' certain transactions and services as defined in the Law No. 6802 are subject to this tax. Bankers' other transactions are subject to VAT.

==== Stamp duty ====
There are many documents that are subject to stamp duty such as contracts, letter of credit, letter of guarantee, financial statements, payrolls. The stamp tax is collected at a rate of 0.89% to 0.948% as a percentage of the value of the document and is collected at a fixed price (a predetermined price) for some documents.

=== Taxes on wealth ===
==== Inheritance and gift tax ====
The subject of this tax is Turkish citizens who have international assets. Foreigners who have a permanent residency are liable to inheritance and gift tax on assets located in Turkey and assets and income received from Turkish citizens. Foreigners who do not have permanent residency are liable to this tax on assets located in Turkey. There is a progressive tax rate that varies from 10% to 30% and 1% to 10% on the items received as gift or inherited.

==== Property tax ====
Property tax is levied on buildings and lands in Turkey. Per annum, property tax is calculated at rates ranging from 0.1% to 0.3% by the said municipality. Within the metropolitan cities, these rates have increased by 100%.

Owner of the building/land is the taxpayer and has any usufruct right on the building/land or if neither of these exists anyone that uses the building/land is regarded as its owner.

==== Motor vehicle tax ====
The subjects of the tax are vehicles registered to traffic bureaus or offices such as land motors and also helicopters and airplanes registered to the Directorate General of Civil Aviation.

Taxpayers are civil and legal persons who own motor vehicles registered in their own names in the traffic register and civil aviation records kept by the Ministry of Transport, Maritime Affairs and Communications.

Every year, at the beginning of January, MVT is assessed and accrued. There are two equal installments in January and July each year.

There are three categories for motor vehicles that are taxable:

1. cars, motorcycles and terrain vehicles etc.
2. minibuses, panel vans, motorized caravans, busses, trucks etc.
3. planes and helicopters

== See also ==
- Varlık Vergisi
