= 2000s Turkish economic boom =

The Turkish economic boom of the 2000s (also known as the Turkish economic miracle) was a period of stabilization and growth following the 2001 Turkish economic crisis. Between 2002 and 2007, Turkey's economy experienced an average growth rate of 7.2%, much higher than the average growth rate during the nineties. The Turkish economy saw relative prosperity during the 2008 financial crisis and the Great Recession and grew 8.8% in 2010, and 9.2% in 2011.

Turkey saw a decrease in unemployment rates, an increase in education rates, and higher life expectancy throughout the country. Turkey's continued economic growth throughout the 2000s was due to multiple factors, including a string of reforms inaugurated by then-Minister of Economic Affairs, Kemal Derviş.

== Recovery and progression after the 2001 economic crisis ==
=== The launch of new economic programs ===
In the spring of 2001, the Turkish government launched a number of macroeconomic policies under the new economic program. These new medium-term policies led to recovery within the country and the later rise of real GDP in the second quarter of 2002. The most significant contributor to the rise in real GDP was the recovery of domestic demand due to the resurgence of the investment sector.

=== New government structure and work with the International Monetary Fund ===
The Turkish government changed significantly after the 2002 Turkish General elections, when the new AKP political party was elected, removing the DSP, ANAP and MHP parties who had political power in the 1990s. Following this election, the political landscape of Turkey became much less varied, as the AKP had a majority of the power. This new government partnered with the International Monetary Fund, an organization made up of 189 countries whose goals include promoting low unemployment, economic stability, financial security, and increasing international trade. In 2002, the International Monetary Fund agreed to lend Turkey roughly $16 billion over the following three years in an attempt to lower governmental debts by creating a surplus in budget revenues. The Turkish government went on to implement a number of public reforms, with the most significant being the adoption of a public sector primary surplus 6.5% of the nation's GNP target for 2003 onward.

== Indications of long term growth after 2004 ==
=== Increase in private investments, labor productivity, and continued growth ===
Despite the rapid changes seen following the 2001 financial crisis, there were strong indications of subsequent long-term growth post-2004. There was a double-digit increase in private investment in 2002 and 2003. Although this growth occurred in 2002 and 2003, private investment can be a sign of long term growth to follow within a country.

Along with the increase in private investments in Turkey, the country also saw an increase in labor productivity within the labor markets. The increases in private investments and the productivity of workers were two relevant factors that likely contributed to the long term economic growth in Turkey in 2004 and beyond.

=== Increased number of exports ===
During this time in 2002 and 2003, Turkey also saw an improvement in external financing. With the improvement in external financing came positive portfolio flows combined with the funds provided by the International Monetary Fund, an overall increase in investments and an increase in gross foreign reserves occurred within the country. The external finance adjustments and improvements that were made, combined with the increase in labor productivity, domestic production within Turkey rose significantly. In the early 2000s, the Turkish Lira experienced significant depreciation, and along with the improvement in external competitiveness and finance, Turkey saw a rise in their total exports. In total, the number of products and goods and services exported from Turkey, in terms of volume, rose roughly 7% in both 2002 and 2003. This increase in exports plausibly played a role in Turkey's growth through the 2000s and it also served as an indicator for future growth to follow post-2004.

== Results of macroeconomic stabilization ==
The economic growth that Turkey experienced was unlikely, was it not for the macroeconomic stabilization that the country implemented between 2002 and 2007. From 2001 to 2007, Turkey was able to reduce its public sector borrowing from roughly 12% of GDP to almost 0% by 2007. Additionally, Turkey achieved a central budget surplus of around 3% between 2002 and 2007, which enabled the country to have a near-balanced central budget beginning in 2006.

The macroeconomic stabilization also saw support from the monetary side of the country. The central bank decided to make price stability in the country a priority and succeeded as the annual inflation rate declined from 54.2% in 2001 to around 8.8% in 2007. This monetary success was another piece of the economic stabilization that Turkey achieved from 2002 until 2007.

== Subsequent crisis ==
Turkey experienced a renewed currency and debt crisis beginning in 2018.

== See also ==
- Anatolian Tigers
