= Public Oversight, Accounting and Auditing Standards Authority =

- KGK
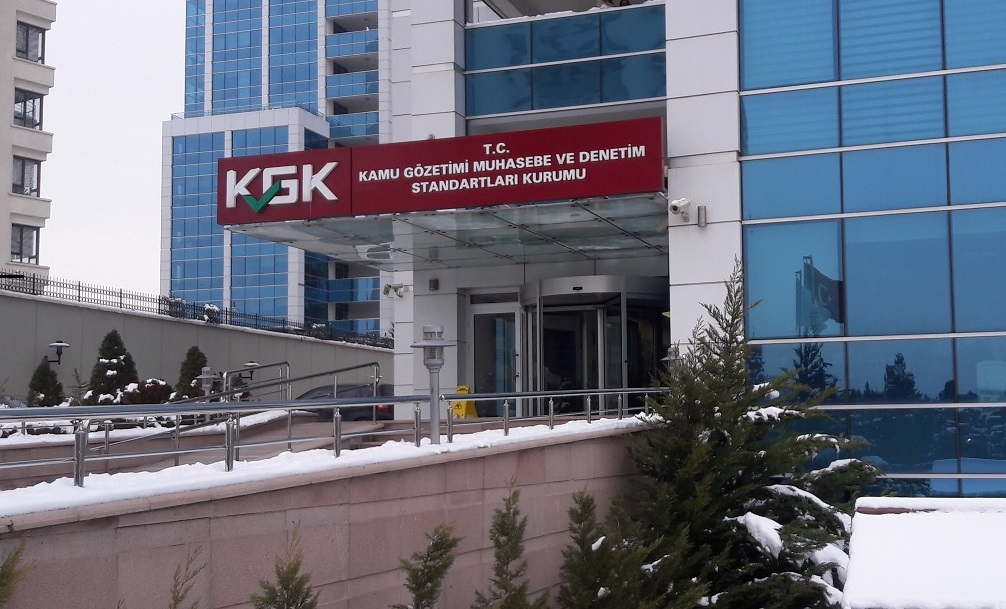
- Headquarters of Public Oversight, Accounting and Auditing Standards Authority in Ankara, Turkey.

Agency overview
- Formed: November 2, 2011
- Preceding agency: Turkish Accounting Standards Board
- Headquarters: Söğütözü Mah. 2177 Sok. No:4 Çankaya, Ankara, Turkey
- Website: kgk.gov.tr

The Public Oversight, Accounting and Auditing Standards Authority (Turkish: Kamu Gözetimi, Muhasebe ve Denetim Standartları Kurumu, KGK) is a government organization in Turkey with responsibility for regulation of determining auditing standards and ethics, authorizing independent auditors and audit companies under a public oversight system and monitoring their activities within the frame of quality assurance in the process of EU negotiations.
