= Currency interventions under Erdoğan administration =

The currency interventions under Erdoğan administration started as a result of the sale of foreign exchange reserves of the Central Bank of the Republic of Turkey (CBRT).

From 2019 to 2020, the CBRT sold foreign currency amounting to estimated $128bn to bolster the weakening Turkish lira. The opposition parties alleged that this was a violation of floating exchange rate regime and that the former chairman of the central bank Naci Ağbal was sacked for investigating the incident. Further allegations are lack of transparency over the intervention data and insider trading.

Turkish President Recep Tayyip Erdoğan called the accusations "hullabalo" and "treachery" intended to scare away foreign investors. CBRT does not publish its net foreign reserves, but independent estimates put it around negative $50bn after the sale.

In March 2025, the CBRT sold another $12 billion, after the arrest of Ekrem İmamoğlu, President Erdoğan's main political rival, which triggered panic among investors. The action was taken after lira plunged 11% against the US dollar on 19 May.

== Monetary policy ==
Interest makes the rich richer and the poor poorer. Interest is the cause of the inflation.

— Recep Tayyip Erdoğan

Erdoğan, an ardent opponent of high interest rates, prevented the central bank officials from rising policy rates. This left policymakers with limited options to curb the inflation. According to the estimates made by Kerim Rota, former banker and the vice-chairman of the Future Party, CBRT sold $33bn in 2019 and $93.3bn in 2020.

Turkish economist Mahfi Eğilmez estimated that the central bank reserves were reduced to negative $39.6bn after excluding the swaps. According to the former chairmain of the central bank Durmuş Yılmaz, the reserves were at negative $55bn. The estimates provided by Goldman Sachs put it at negative $60bn.

Throughout the fall of 2021, the Monetary Policy Board reduced the policy rates from 19% to 14%. Despite selling billions of dollars from the central bank savings, lira depreciated from TL8.30 for $1 in early September to TL17.50 for $1 in mid December. On December 21, the government announced the Exchange Rate Protected Time Deposits (Kur Korumalı Vadeli Mevduat) scheme to make lira more attractive, after which $/TL parity plateaued at around TL13.50.

The Exchange Protected Deposits ensured account holders that any increase in the dollar/TL parity which is higher than the policy rate would be compensated by the Treasury. Some economists called this an "implicit rate rise" and warned that it could burden the public finance.

== Reception ==
The opposition campaigned against the government's currency policy under the slogan "What happened to the $128bn?" The leader of main opposition party, Kemal Kılıçdaroğlu claimed that the president committed a fraud and pledged to hold Erdoğan responsible.

The government argued that the depreciation of the currency was deliberately undertaken to boost the exports and encourage growth, but this is contradictory to the fact that CBRT sold billions of dollars to bolster lira.

Erdoğan appealed to nationalist sentiment and stated that the country was fighting an "economic war of independence", referring to the military campaigns of 1919-22. Foreign media called the situation an "economic experiment."

== Aftermath ==
The disastrous currency intervention hardened the conditions of the Turkish economics crisis. The low policy rates along with the effects of the coronavirus pandemic caused the inflation to rise as high as 80% according to the official figures.

In June 2023, the government backtracked from the currency policy and CBRT started to raise the policy rates. As of July 2023, it is speculated that the central bank continues the foreign currency sale, albeit at smaller amounts.
