= Turkey and the World Bank =

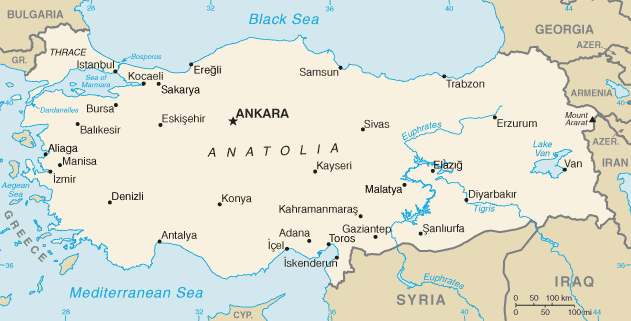
Map representing the numerous regions comprising Turkey in relation to their Sea borders on three sides.

The World Bank Group (WBG) has been lending aid and providing means of promoting development to Turkey since July 1950, which began with the implementation of a series of port construction and development projects meant to ignite commercial economy and cultivate stability within the region. These established ports have been integral to the development and success of economic growth and stability throughout the republic as it is surrounded by water on three sides. Through the efforts and involvement by the WBG, Turkey has become one of the larger developing middle tier countries in regards to income associated with the group, as well as one of the most established economies around the globe today. From 1950 to 2017 the efforts championed by the World Bank in and around the extensive regions comprising the Republic of Turkey have been oriented towards environmental preservation, economic growth and stability, establishing infrastructure, promoting education and cultivating an interest in energy and sustainability.

The International Bank for Reconstruction and Development (IBRD) has pledged a net commitment of $4.2 billion primarily for the further development of energy development and pipeline accessibility as well as health care, urban stability, and private Investment. There are currently 11 projects being developed and executed in accordance with Turkey's National Development Plan strategy for promoting the country both technologically and financially on the world stage.

In 2012, the Country Partnership Strategy (CPS) ran a systematic diagnostic that broke down the data to show action necessary for ensuring economic success and avoidance of national stagnation. Analyzing both private and public sectors of the workforce, business development, and social groups, the Turkish governments along with the cooperation of the World Bank plan to utilize this information to make fully informed decisions regarding national development plans. CPS traditionally supports the implementation of select individual objectives, first, increased employment ratings, second, improved equity throughout public domains, and lastly, the further establishment of sustainable development. The economic climate is proving to create a strong opportunity for Turkey to dominate the energy industry and establish themself as the leading power in regards to alternative hydro, wind, geothermal and other forms of sustainable energy outlets.

On November 1, 2016, the World Bank Organization approved Turkey's Geothermal Energy Development Project, committing $250 million of the $352 million necessary to complete the project. This project is projected to reach completion by December 2022 and will aid in pursuing renewable and more sustainable way of energy production. The Geothermal Development Project aims to reduce industry impact of natural resources, atmospheric pollution, and create a more sustainable avenue for energy production. With Turkey's rising economy, pursuing modern techniques for energy production may give additional stability and prestige to the country's presence internationally on the world stage.
