= Climate change in Europe =

Emissions, effects, and responses of Europe related to climate change

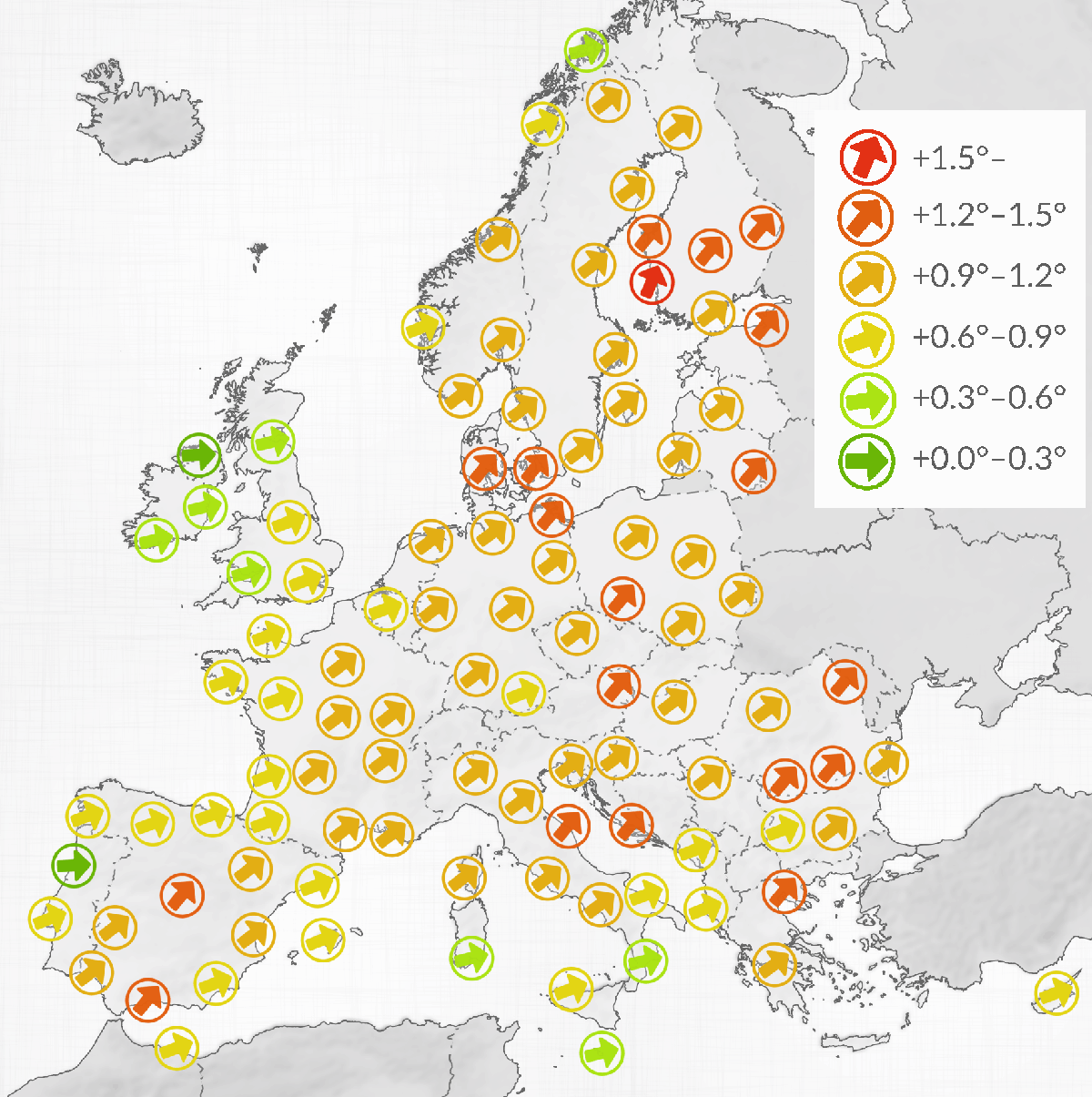
Increase of average yearly temperature (2000–2017) above the 20th century average in selected cities in Europe

Climate change has resulted in an increase in temperature of 2.3 °C (4.14 °F) (2022) in Europe compared to pre-industrial levels. Europe is the fastest-warming continent in the world. Europe's climate is getting warmer due to anthropogenic activity. According to international climate experts, global temperature rise should not exceed 2 °C to prevent the most dangerous consequences of climate change; without reduction in greenhouse gas emissions, this could happen before 2050. Climate change has implications for all regions of Europe, with the extent and nature of effects varying across the continent.

Effects on European countries include warmer weather and increasing frequency and intensity of extreme weather such as heat waves, bringing health risks and effects on ecosystems, for example, the 2026 European drought. European countries are major contributors to global greenhouse gas emissions; however, the European Union and governments of several countries have outlined plans to implement climate change mitigation and an energy transition in the 21st century, the European Green Deal being one of these.

Public opinion in Europe shows concern about climate change; in the European Investment Bank's Climate Survey of 2020, 90% of Europeans believe their children will experience the effects of climate change in their daily lives. Climate change activism and businesses shifting their practices has taken place in Europe.

== Greenhouse gas emissions ==
Development of CO_{2} emissions in the European Union.

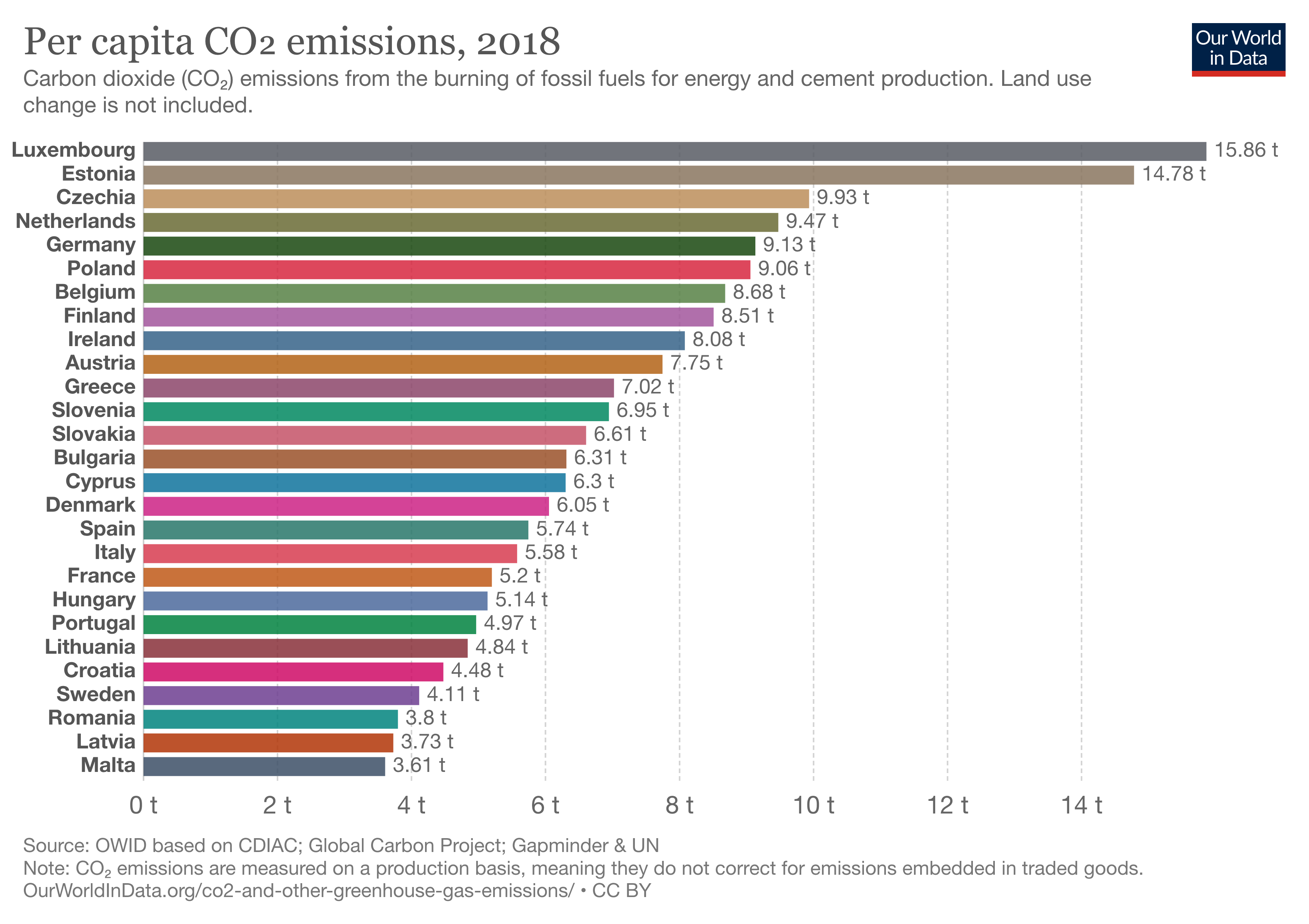
CO_{2} emissions per capita in the European Union.

As a source of electric power in the EU, renewables overtook fossil fuels by 2020, and solar and wind together exceeded fossil fuels by 2025.

The share of electricity coming from renewable sources continues to vary widely among European nations. A few countries generate more electricity from renewables than is consumed in total.

EU-27 contributes about 6.4% of global greenhouse gas emissions.

A 2016 European Environment Agency (EEA) report documents greenhouse gas (GHG) emissions between 1990 and 2014 for the EU-28 individual member states by IPCC sector. Total greenhouse gas emissions fell by 24% between 1990 and 2014, but road transport emissions rose by 17%. Cars, vans, and trucks had the largest absolute increase in CO_{2} emissions of any sector over the last 25 years, growing by 124 Mt. Aviation also grew by 93 Mt over the same period, a massive 82% increase.

In 2019 European Union emissions reached 3.3 Gt (3.3 billion metric tons), 80% of which was from fossil fuels.

In 2021, the European Parliament approved a landmark law setting GHG targets for 2050. The law aims to achieve carbon neutrality and, after 2050, negative emissions and paves the way for a policy overhaul in the European Union. Under the law, the European Union must act to lower net GHG emissions by at least 55% by 2030 (compared to 1990). The law sets a limit of 225 Mt of CO_{2} equivalent to the contribution of removals to the target. According to Swedish lawmaker Jytte Guteland, the law would allow Europe to become the first carbon-neutral continent by 2050.

In 2023, EU greenhouse gas emissions fell by 8.3% — the largest drop since 2020's pandemic-driven 9.8% decline. Emissions are now 37% below 1990 levels, while GDP has grown by 68%, indicating the decoupling of emissions from economic growth. According to the European Commission, the EU remains on track to meet its 2030 goal of cutting emissions by 55%.

=== Energy consumption ===
==== Coal ====
The coal consumption in Europe was 26,060 petajoules (7,239 TWh) in 1985 and has fallen to 9,400 PJ (2,611 TWh) in 2020. The coal consumption in the EU was 18,450 PJ (5,126 TWh) in 1985 and has fallen to 5,850 PJ (1,624 TWh) in 2020. The height of CO_{2} emissions from coal in Europe were in 1987 with 3.31 billion tonnes, and in 2019 with 1.36 billion tonnes.

Russia had the most CO_{2} emissions from coal in Europe in 2019 (395.03 Mt), Germany had the second most CO_{2} emissions from coal in Europe (235.7 Mt). Iceland's CO_{2} emissions from coal grew 151%, Turkey's CO_{2} emissions from coal grew 131% between and Montenegro CO_{2} emissions from coal grew 13% between 1990 and 2019, the rest of the European countries had a decrease in coal consumption in that period of time.

From 2012 to 2018 in the EU coal fell by around 180 PJ (50 TWh), compared to a rise of 110 PJ (30 TWh) in wind power and solar energy generation and a rise of 110 PJ (30 TWh) in gas generation. The remaining 36 PJ (10 TWh) covered a small structural increase in electricity consumption. In 2019 coal generation will be about 12% of the EU's 2019 greenhouse gas emissions.

==== Fossil gas/other methane ====
The EU classifies fossil gas as a "green" energy for investment purposes under the taxonomy, although it is a fossil fuel. According to Global Energy Monitor plans to expand infrastructure contradict EU climate goals.

The EU used 14,280 PJ (3,966 TWh) in 2021 and Europe as a whole used 36,270 PJ (10,074 TWh) in 2021.

The decline in methane emissions from 1990 to 1995 in the OECD is largely due to non-climate regulatory programs and the collection and flaring or use of landfill methane. In many OECD countries, landfill methane emissions are not expected to grow, despite continued or even increased waste generation, because of non-climate change-related regulations that result in mitigation of air emissions, collection of gas, or closure of facilities. A major driver in the OECD is the European Union Landfill Directive, which limits the amount of organic matter that can enter solid waste facilities. Although the organic matter is expected to decrease rapidly in the EU, emissions occur as a result of total waste in place. Emissions will have a gradual decline over time.

=== Agriculture ===
Greenhouse gases are also released through agriculture. Livestock production is common in Europe, responsible for 42% of land in Europe. This land use for livestock does affect the environment. Agriculture accounts for 10% of Europe's greenhouse gas emissions, this percentage being even larger in other parts of the world. Along with this percentage, agriculture is also responsible for being the largest contributor of non carbon dioxide greenhouse gas emissions being emitted annually in Europe. Agriculture has been found to release other gases besides carbon dioxides such as methane and nitrous oxide. A study claimed that 38% of greenhouse gases released through agriculture in Europe were methane. These farms release methane through chemicals in fertilizers used, manure, and a process called enteric fermentation. These gases are estimated to possibly cause even more damage than carbon dioxide, a study by Environmental Research Letters claims that "CH_{4} has 20 times more heat-trapping potential than CO_{2} and N_{2}O has 300 times more." These emissions released through agriculture are also linked to soil acidification and loss of biodiversity in Europe as well.

Europe is attempting to take action. The Land Use Change and Forestry (LULUCF) was created, focusing on lowering the amount of greenhouse gas emissions through land use in Europe. Some success was seen, between 1990 and 2016, greenhouse gases emitted through agriculture in Europe decreased by 20%. However, the European Union has a plan to become carbon neutral by 2050. If more policies are not implemented or if there is no dietary shift, it has been concluded the European Union may not reach this goal.

According to the European Green Deal, it is critical to minimize reliance on pesticides and antimicrobials, eliminate excess fertilization (particularly nitrogen and phosphorus), promote organic farming, improve animal welfare, and reverse biodiversity loss. The introduction and successful implementation of sustainable agriculture can assist developing nations improve their food security, as well as strengthening soil and plan carbon sinks globally.

=== Transport ===
==== Road ====
Road transport emits about a fifth of EU greenhouse gas.

==== Aviation ====
Aviation is taxed less than train travel.

==== Shipping ====
Greenhouse gas emissions from shipping equal the carbon footprint of a quarter of passenger cars in Europe. Shipping is not covered by the Paris Agreement but is subject to the EU ETS, and will be subject to the UK ETS from 2026.

=== Other greenhouse gases ===
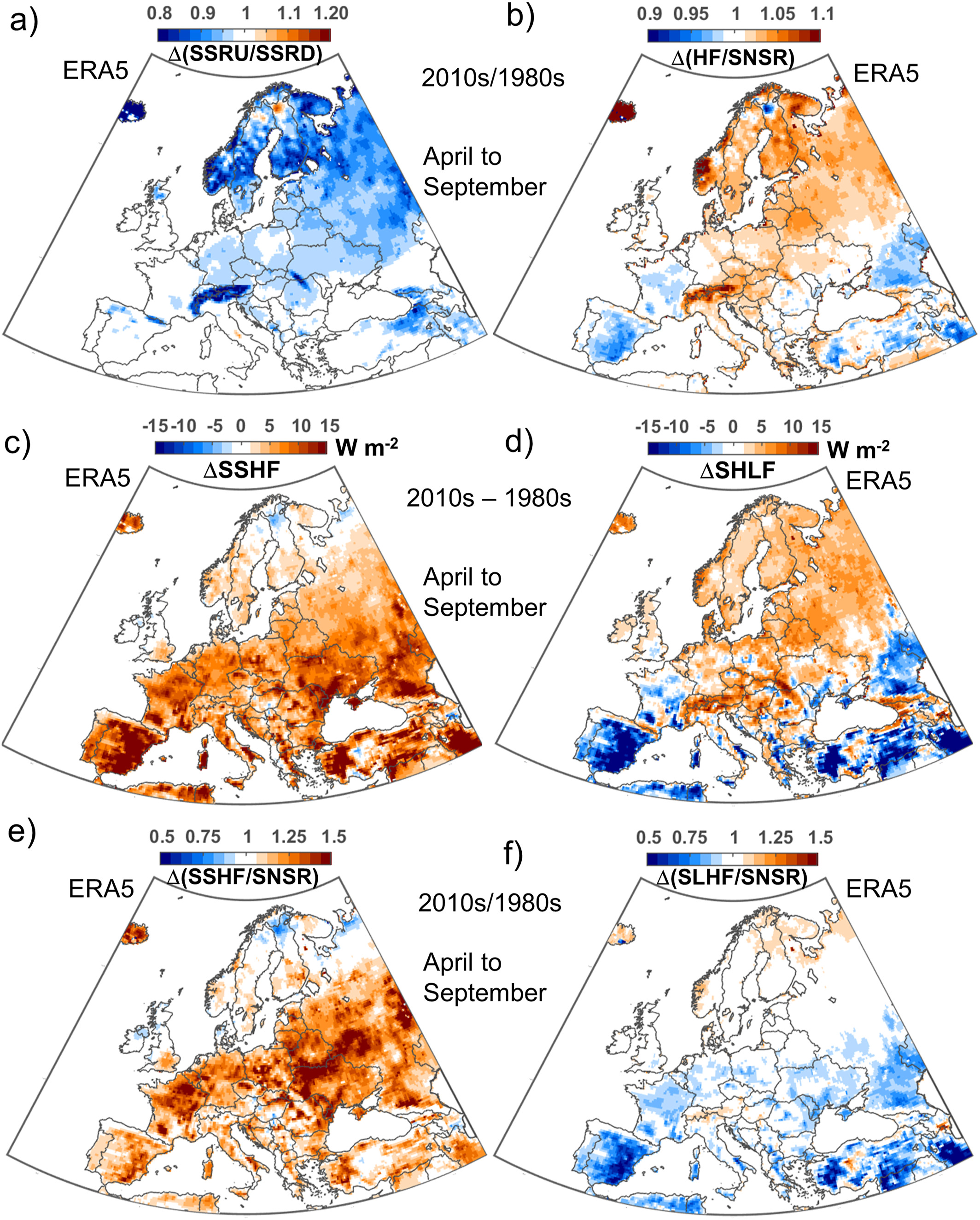
Between 1980s and 2010s, the reduction in aerosol density over Europe (colloquially known as global dimming) had lowered the difference between thermal energy entering from the atmosphere and radiating off the ground (top left, blue), and increased the net amount of heating (other graphics, red)..

==== Hydrofluorocarbons ====
Trifluoromethane (HFC-23) is generated and emitted as a byproduct during the production of chlorodifluoromethane (HCFC-22). HCFC-22 is used both in emissive applications (primarily air conditioning and refrigeration) and as a feedstock for production of synthetic polymers. Because HCFC-22 depletes stratospheric ozone, its production for non-feedstock uses is scheduled to be phased out under the Montreal Protocol. However, feedstock production is permitted to continue indefinitely.

In the developed world, HFC-23 emissions decreased between 1990 and 2000 due to process optimization and thermal destruction, although there were increased emissions in the intervening years.

The United States (U.S.) and the European Union drove these trends in the developed world. Although emissions increased in the EU between 1990 and 1995 due to increased production of HCFC-22, a combination of process optimization and thermal oxidation led to a sharp decline in EU emissions after 1995, resulting in a net decrease in emissions of 67 percent for this region between 1990 and 2000.

== Effects on the natural environment ==
=== Temperature and weather changes ===
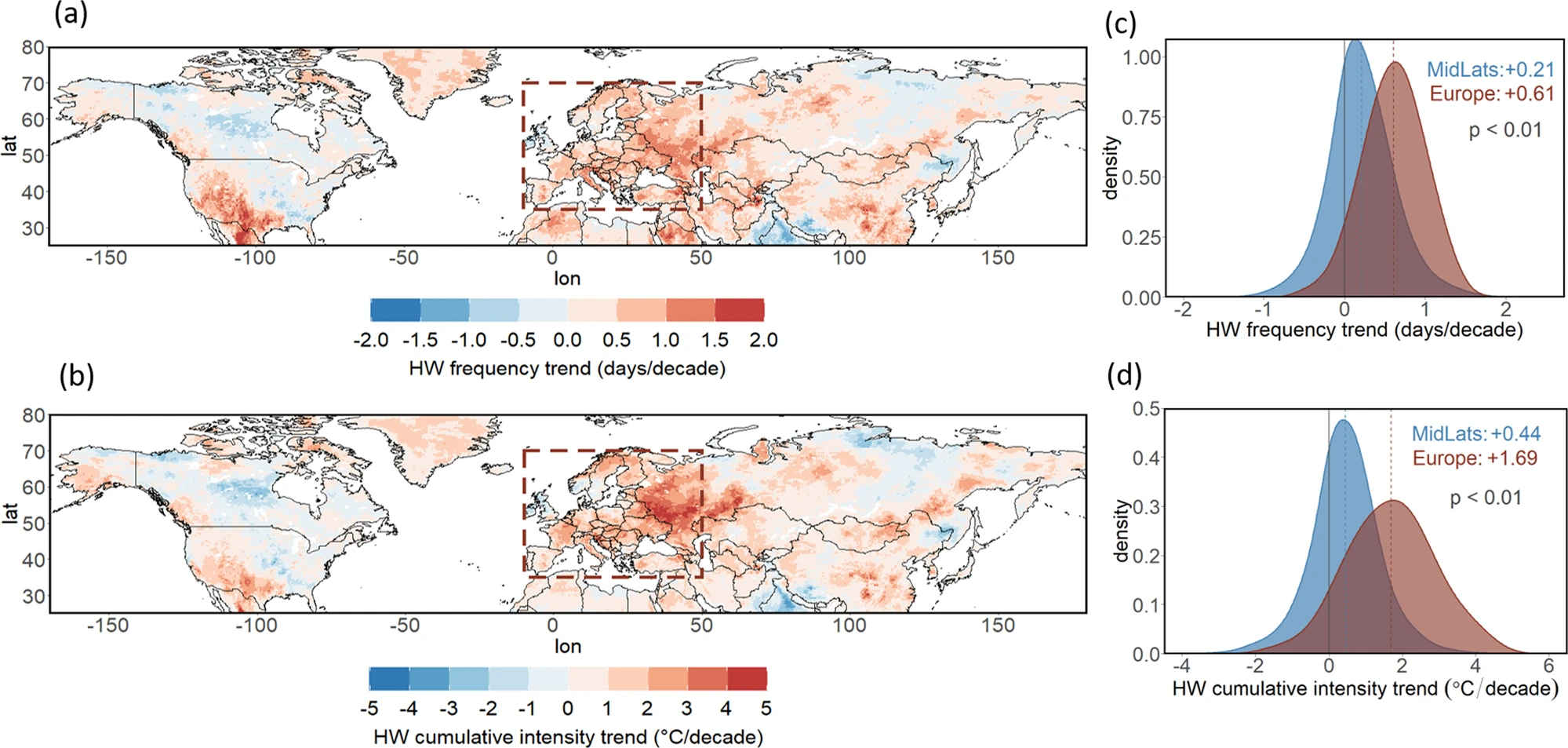
Map of increasing heatwave trends (frequency and cumulative intensity) over the midlatitudes and Europe, July–August 1979–2020. In western Europe, heatwaves have been increasing "three-to-four times faster compared to the rest of the northern midlatitudes over the past 42 years".

Köppen climate classification map for Europe for 1980–2016

2071–2100 map under the most intense climate change scenario. Mid-range scenarios are currently considered more likely

The World Meteorological Organization's State of the Climate 2021 stated that temperatures in Europe increased at more than twice the global average over the preceding 30 years–the highest increase of any continent in the world. The European Environment Agency stated that from pre-industrial times, European land temperatures have increased by 1.94–1.99 °C, faster than the global average increase of 1.11–1.14 °C.

The Arctic sea ice decreased 33.000 km^{2} between 1979 and 2020 per year during the winter and 79.000 km^{2} per year during the summer in the same period of time. If temperatures are kept below 1.5 °C warming ice free Arctic summers would be rare but it would be a frequent event with a 2 °C warming.

In the Baltic Sea ice melting has been seen since 1800 and with an acceleration happening since the 1980s. Sea ice was at a record low in the winter of 2019–2020.

These extreme weather changes may increase the severity of diseases in animals as well as humans. The heat waves will increase the number of forest fires. Experts have warned that climate change may increase the number of global climate refugees from 150 million in 2008 to 800 million in the future. The International agreement of refugees does not recognize climate change refugees. From 2012 to 2022, according to the European Environment Agency, extreme weather events cost Europe more than €145 billion in economic damages. Climate-related economic losses grew by about 2% each year throughout the same time.

A study of future changes in flood, heat-waves, and drought effects for 571 European cities, using climate model runs from the coupled model intercomparison project Phase 5 (CMIP5) found that heat-wave days increase across all cities, but especially in southern Europe, whilst the greatest heatwave temperature increases are expected in central European cities. For the small effect scenario, drought conditions intensify in southern European cities while river flooding worsens in northern European cities. However, the large effect scenario projects that most European cities will see increases in both drought and river flood risks. Over 100 cities are particularly vulnerable to two or more climate effects.

==== Extreme weather events ====
Record meteorological events In Europe.
| When | Where | What | Cost |
|---|---|---|---|
| 2003 | Europe | hottest summer in at least 500 years | 70,000 deaths |
| 2000 | England and Wales | wettest autumn on record since 1766 | £1.3 billion |
| 2007 | England and Wales | wettest July on record since 1766 | £3 billion |
| 2007 | Greece | hottest summer since 1891 | wildfires |
| 2010 | Russia | hottest summer since 1500 | $15 billion. 55,000 deaths |
| 2011 | France | hottest and driest spring since 1880 | grain harvest down by 12% |
| 2012 | Arctic | sea ice minimum | |
Costs are estimates

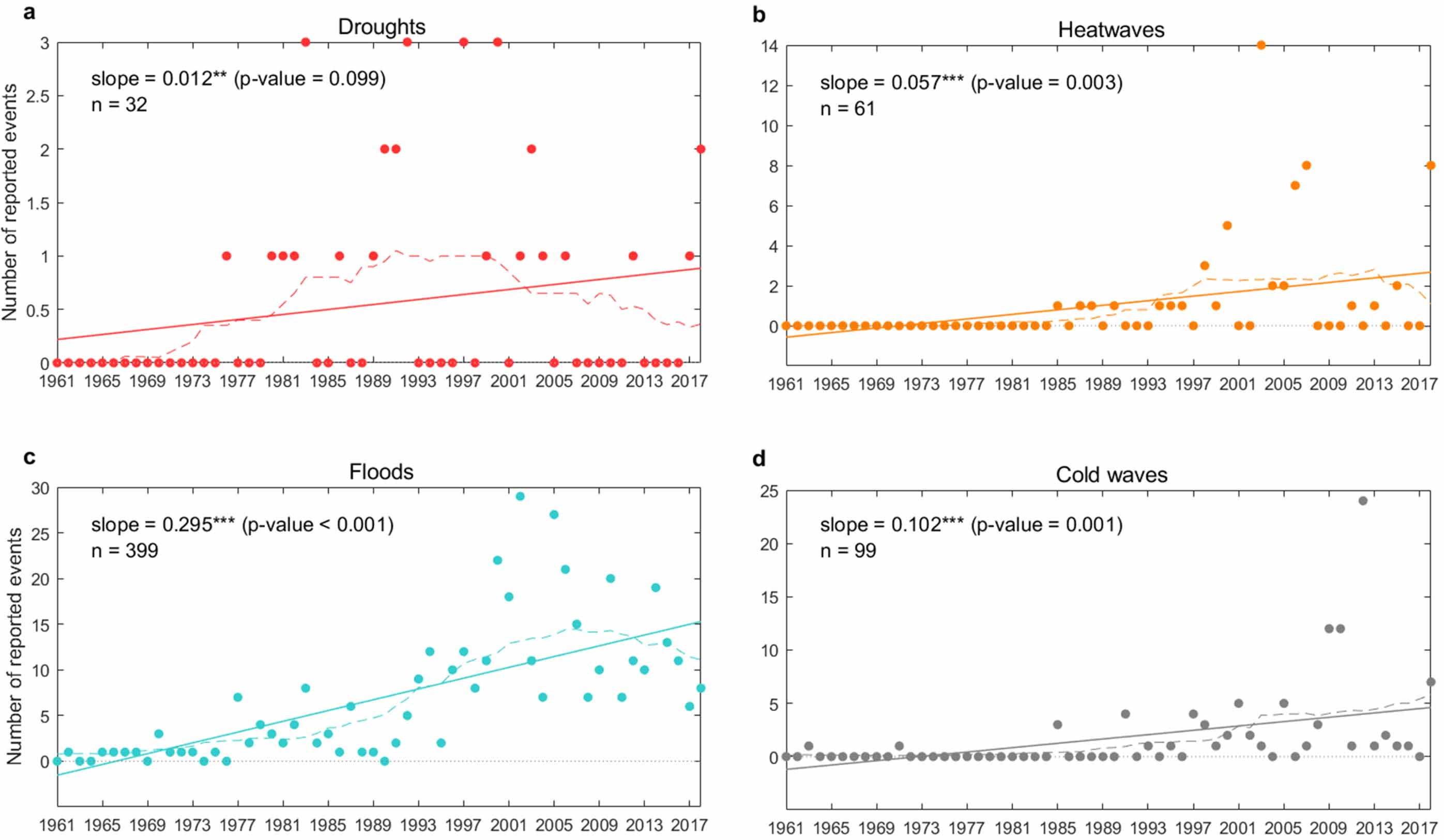
The observed increase in extreme weather events in Europe, from 1964 to 2015.

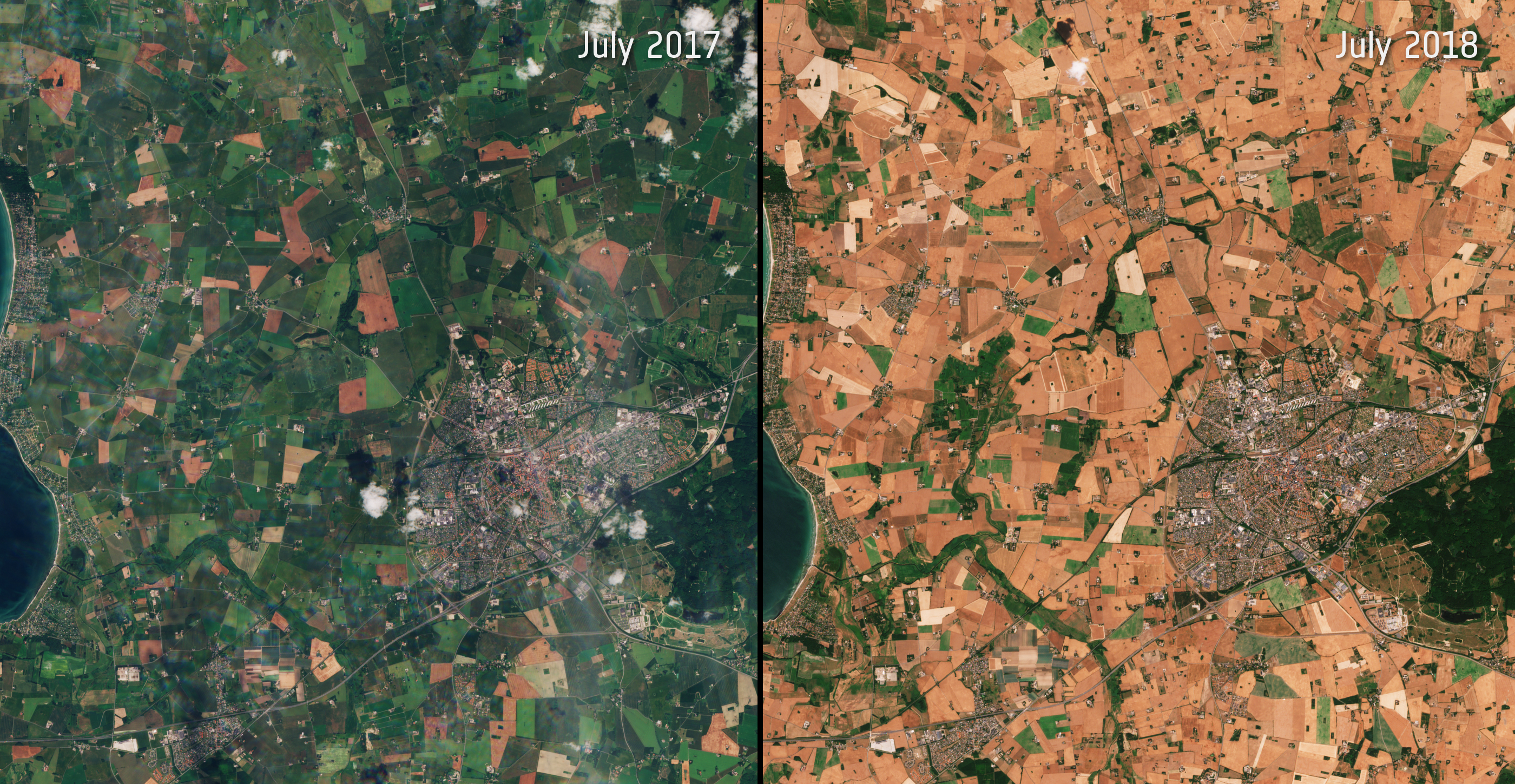
Satellite image comparison showing the effect of the 2018 heat wave on agricultural fields in Slagelse, Denmark.

The summer of 2019 brought a series of high temperature records in Western Europe. During a heat wave a glaciological rarity in the form of a previously unseen lake emerged in the Mont Blanc Massif in the French Alps, at the foot of the Dent du Géant at an altitude of about 3400 meters, that was considered as evidence for the effects of global warming on the glaciers.

The summer of 2023 was the warmest on record globally, the average European temperature that summer was 0.0.83 °C above average.

In June 2026, a widespread European heatwave pushed daytime temperatures above 40 °C in parts of southern and central Europe, with unusually high overnight temperatures persisting in many areas. The World Meteorological Organization reported that large parts of the continent experienced conditions far above seasonal norms, while attribution studies linked the severity of the event to human-caused climate change. The heatwaves created drought. Climate change made it 80 times more likely in western Europe and 40 times more likely in eastern Europe. Many countries have restricted water use, wildfires spread across Europe and agriculture was hit hard. The drought reduced the flow of water in the rivers, cutting the generation of hydropower and reducing the movement of ships, which can increase food and energy prices.

=== Effects on flora ===
In the aftermath of the 2003 heat wave, researchers noted how the alpine ecosystems of Italy were affected. Namely, the heat wave "triggered a rapid expansion of vascular plant species at the expense of mosses in peatlands". Peatlands are known to be supreme carbon-storing environments, and thus alterations caused by anthropogenic climate change poses a threat to long-term climate stability.

== Effects on people ==
Climate change severely endangers the population in Europe, according to the EAA risk assessment, while "climate threats " are growing faster than our societal preparedness,". Those effects are felt in southern and central Europe. It includes heat waves, flooding, transmission of diseases by mosquitos and more.

=== Health effects ===
==== Heat waves ====
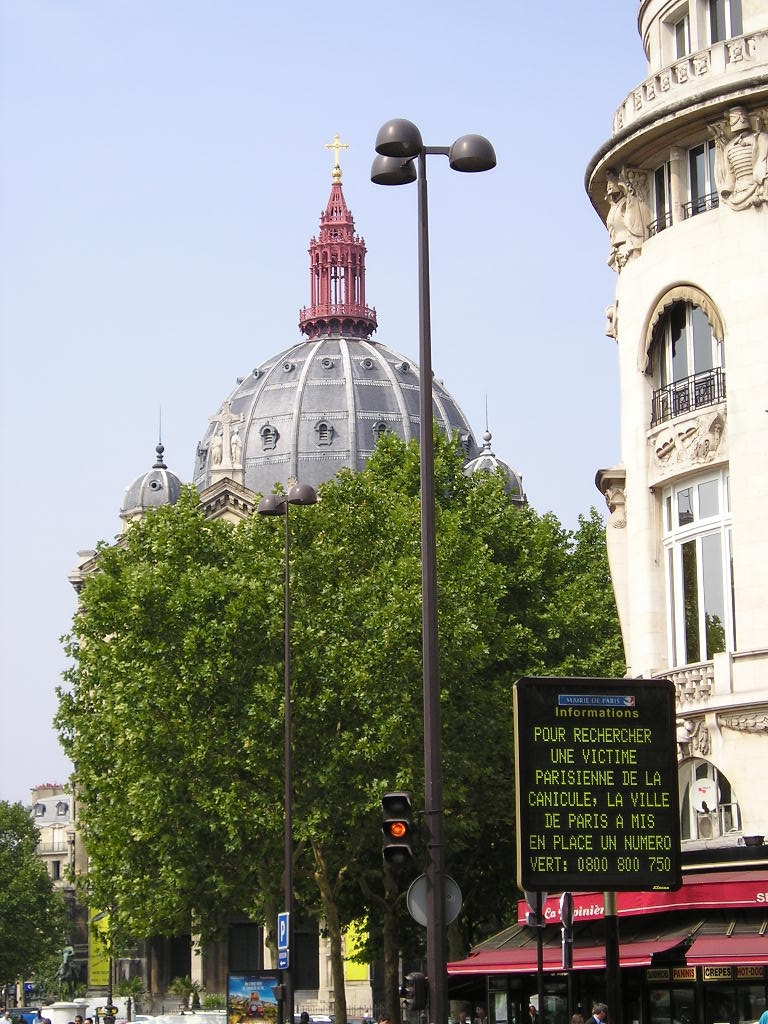
A road sign in Paris giving details of a toll-free phone number to call in the event of death during the 2003 European heat wave.

Due to climate change temperatures rose in Europe and heat mortality increased. From 2003–12 to 2013–22 alone, it increased by 17 deaths per 100,000 people, while women are more vulnerable than men.

In the absence of climate change, extreme heat waves in Europe would be expected to occur only once every several hundred years. In addition to hydrological changes, grain crops mature earlier at a higher temperature, which may reduce the critical growth period and lead to lower grain yields. The Russian heat wave in 2010 caused grain harvest down by 25%, government ban wheat exports, and losses were 1% of GDP. The Russian heat wave 2010 estimate for deaths is 55,000.

The summer of 2003 was probably the hottest in Europe since at least AD 1500, and unusually large numbers of heat-related deaths were reported in France, Germany and Italy. It is very likely that the heat wave was human-induced by greenhouse gases.

These extreme weather changes may increase the severity of diseases in animals as well as humans. The heat waves will increase the number of forest fires. Experts have warned that climate change may increase the number of global climate refugees from 150 million in 2008 to 800 million in future; however, the Convention Relating to the Status of Refugees does not recognize climate change refugees.

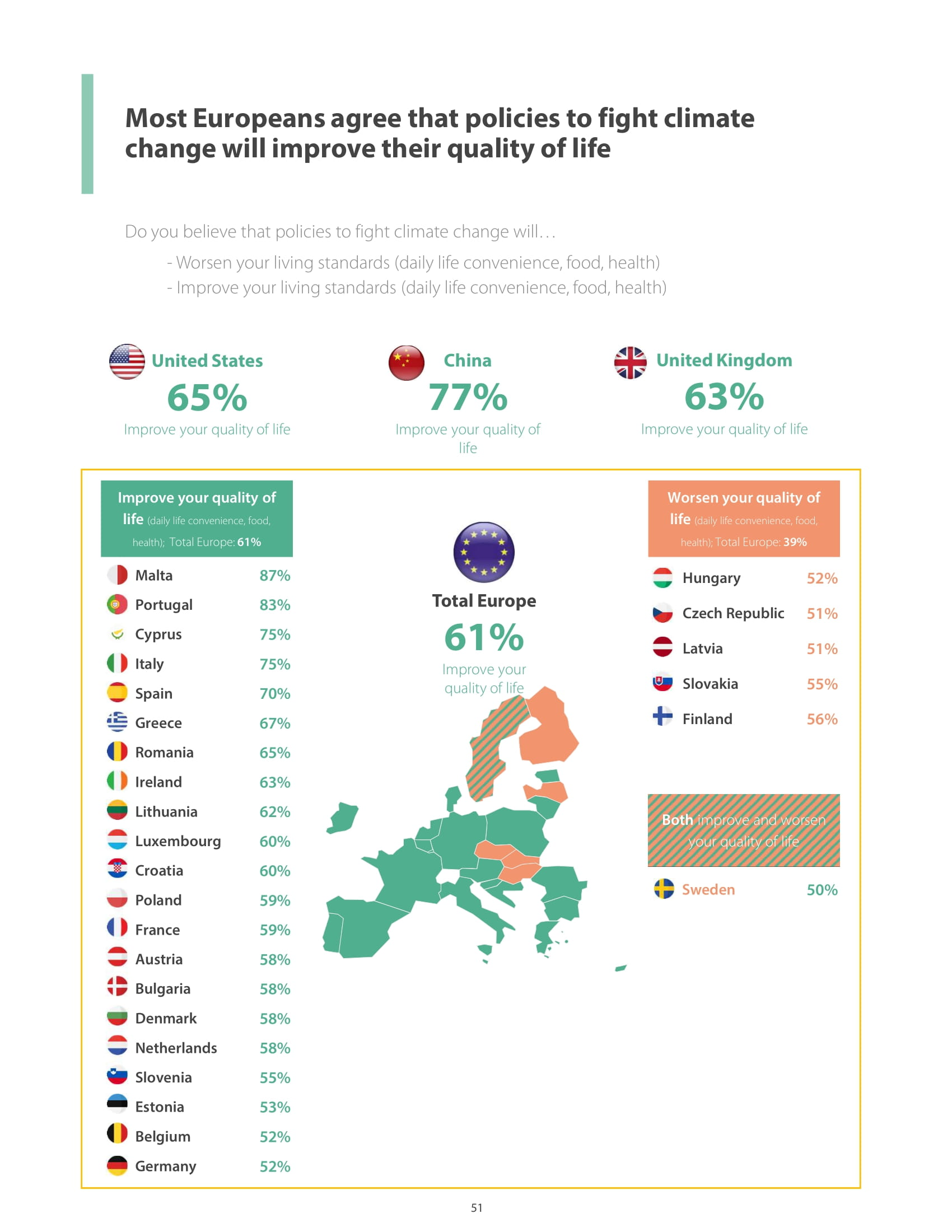
Most European respondents to the 2021-2022 climate survey conducted by the European Investment Bank agree that policies to fight climate change will improve their quality of life

The heat wave in 2018 in England, which would take hundreds of lives, would have had 30 times less of a chance of happening, without climate change. By 2050, such patterns would occur every 2 years if the current rate of warming continues.

The heat wave in summer of 2019 as of June 28, claimed human lives, caused closing or taking special measures in 4,000 schools in France only, and big wildfires. Many areas declared state of emergency and advised the public to avoid "risky behaviour" like leaving children in cars or jogging outside in the middle of the day". The heatwave was made at least 5 times more likely by climate change and possibly even 100 times.

In 2022, severe heatwaves occurred in Western Europe. Wildfires emerged in different places and burned vast territories causing tens of thousands of people to flee their homes. In Spain 510 people died from heat between 10 and 16 July.

68% of European respondents have experienced at least one direct effect from an extreme weather event. Among these effects, 21% faced transportation disruptions, 20% encountered power outages or energy supply challenges, and another 20% dealt with health-related issues. Additionally, 19% reported the destruction of forests or natural areas near their residences.

==== Diseases ====
In 2019 for the first time, cases of Zika fever were diagnosed in Europe not because people traveled to tropical countries like Brazil, but from local mosquitos. Evidence indicating that the warming climate change in the area is the primary cause of this fever. It is thought that climate change could lead to dengue fever epidemics in Europe by 2100 if Aedes mosquito vectors become established.

== Mitigation ==
In the beginning of the 21st century the European Union, began to conceive the European Green Deal as its main program of climate change mitigation. The European Union claims that it has already achieved its 2020 target for emission reduction and has the legislation needed to achieve the 2030 targets. Already in 2018, its GHG emissions were 23% lower than in 1990.

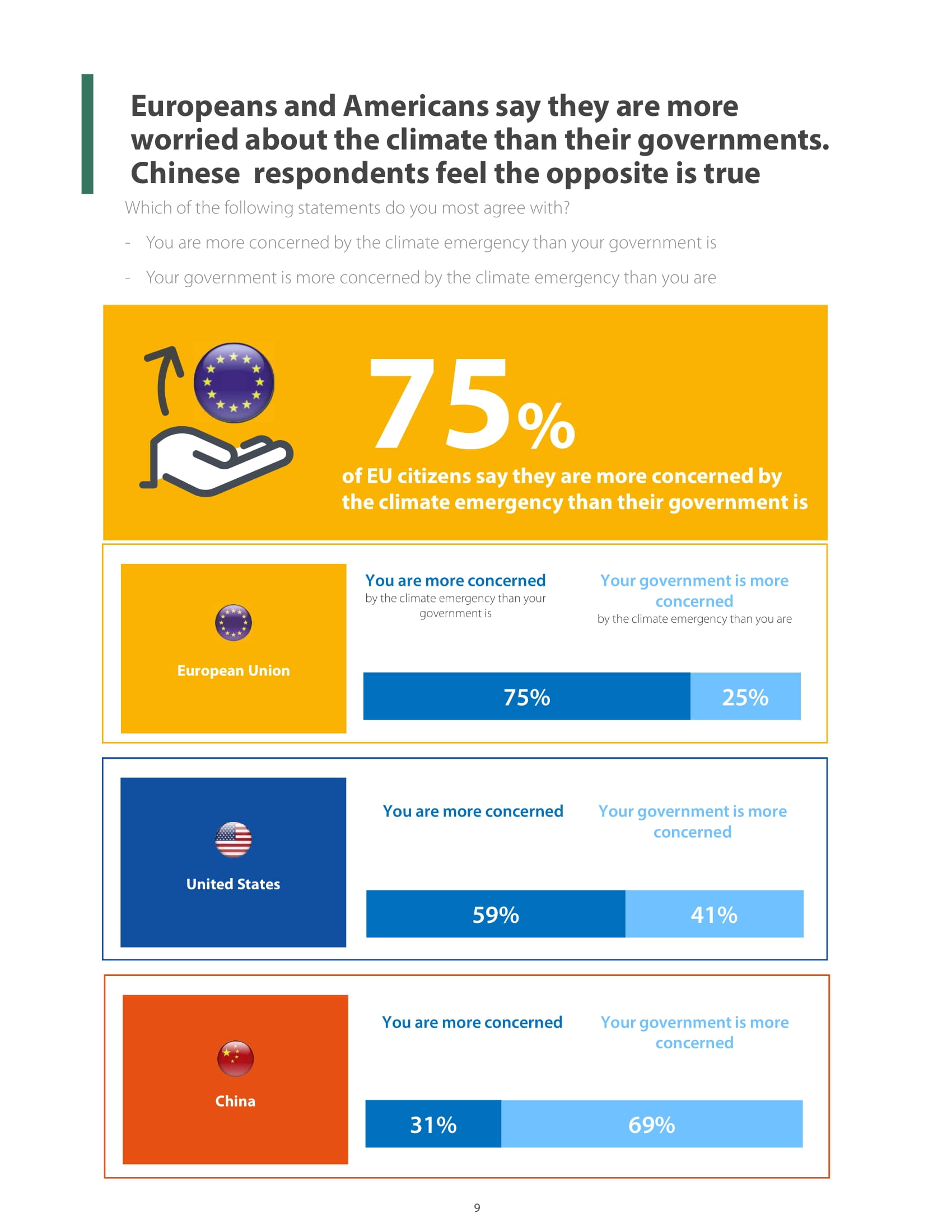
Europeans (and Americans) believe they are more worried about the climate than their governments, as found in the European Investment Bank's climate survey 2021–2022.

In May 2024, a report has been published summarizing the main achievements of the European Union in the environmental domain from 2019.

=== Paris Agreement ===
On April 22, 2016, the Paris Climate Accords were signed by all but three countries around the world. The conference to talk about this document was held in Paris, France. This put Europe in the epicenter of talks about the environment and climate change. The EU was the first major economy that decided to submit its intended contribution to the new agreement in March 2015. The EU ratified the Paris Agreement on October 5, 2015.

In these talks the countries agreed that they all had a long-term goal of keeping global warming to well below 2 degrees Celsius. They agreed that global emissions need to peak as soon as possible, and recognize that this will take longer for developing countries. On the subject of transparency the countries agreed that they would meet every five years to set ambitious goals, report their progress to the public and each other, and track progress for their long-term goals throughout a transparent and accountable system.

The countries recognized the importance of non-party stakeholders to be involved in this process. Cities, regions, and local authorities are encouraged to uphold and promote regional and international cooperation.

The Paris Agreement is a legally international agreement, its main goal is to limit global warming to below 1.5 degrees Celsius, compared to pre-industrial levels. The Nationally Determined Contributions (NDC's) are the plans to fight climate change adapted for each country. Every party in the agreement has different targets based on its own historical climate records and country's circumstances and all the targets for each country are stated in their NDC.

==== National determined goals based on NDC's ====
In the case for member countries of the European Union the goals are very similar and the European Union work with a common strategy within the Paris agreement. The NDC target for countries of the European Union against climate change and greenhouse gas emissions under the Paris agreement are the following:

- 40% reduction in Greenhouse gas emissions until 2030, compared to 1990. This reduction is covered in these four sections;
1. European Union Emission Trading System
2. Outside the EU emissions trading system
3. Land use, land-use change, and forestry (LULUCF)
4. Domestic institutional legislation and mitigation measure
- 55% reduction of greenhouse gases by domestic binding target without contribution from international credits, until 2030 compared to 1990.
- Gases covered in reduction: Carbon Dioxide (CO_{2}), Methane (CH_{4}), Nitrous oxide (N_{2}O), Hydrofluorocarbon (HFCs), Perfluorinated compound (PFCs), Sulfur hexafluoride (SF_{6}) and Nitrogen trifluoride (NF_{3}).
- 40% reduction of emissions from outside the European Union Emission Trading System (EU ETS) until 2030, compared to 2005.

==== Strategy to achieve NDCs ====
Each country has different ways to achieve the established goals depending on resources. In the case of the European union the following approach was established:

- Each member state must report land use and subsequently report compensatory measures for the removal of carbon dioxide from the atmosphere.
- Targets for improved energy efficiency and an increased amount of renewable energy have been established. Until the year 2030, energy consumption will be improved by 32.5%.
- The CO_{2} emission per km must be reduced by 30–37.5% depending on vehicles by 2030
- Limit sales of F-gas, prohibited products and prevent emissions in existing products with F-gases. This is expected to reduce emissions of F-gases by 66% by 2030 compared to 2014.
- Multiannual Financial Framework (MFF) for 2021–2027. MFF will finance climate action, such as policies and programs. MFF shall contribute to climate neutrality by 2050 and to achieving the 2030 climate targets.
- Within the European Union Emission Trading System (EU ETS) a cap on the maximum allowable amount of emissions established. From year 2021 this will also be applied in aviation. The EU ETS is an important tool in EU policy to reduce Greenhouse gas emission in a cost effective way. Under the 'cap and trade' principle, a maximum (cap) is set on the total amount of greenhouse gases that can be emitted by all participating installations.

A survey conducted by the European Investment Bank in 2020 found that although 45% of EU companies have invested in climate change mitigation or adaptation measures, compared to 32% in the US, fewer companies plan future investment in the next three years. 40% of European companies want to invest in climate initiatives during the next three years. The proportion of investment in 2020 varies from 50% in Western and Northern Europe to 32% in Central and Eastern Europe. The majority of European companies, 75%, say regulatory and tax uncertainty is preventing them from investing in climate-related projects.

According to their 2020 Municipality Survey, 56% of European Union municipalities increased climate investment, while 66% believe their climate investment over the previous three years has been insufficient.

According to a study from 2022, while renewables as a whole and specifically hydroelectricity and geothermal energy do reduce emission in European countries, there is a problem with biomass, solar power and wind power as the process of their production also emit big amounts of CO_{2}. The study did not check other greenhouse gases like methane. The authors called to ensure that the energy sources will really reduce emissions.

=== Climate targets ===
The climate commitments of the European Union are divided into 3 main categories: targets for the year 2020, 2030 and 2050. The European Union claim that its policies are in line with the goal of the Paris Agreement. The programm of response to climate change in Europe is called European Green Deal. In April 2020, the European Parliament called to include the European Green Deal in the recovery program from the COVID-19 pandemic.

Targets for the year 2020:

- Reduce GHG emissions by 20% from the level in 1990.
- Produce 20% of energy from renewable sources. Result: 22 percent renewable sources in 2020.
- Increase Energy Efficiency by 20%.
- 10 percent renewable fuels in the transport sector. Result: 10 percent of fuels were renewable on average in the EU27 in 2020.

Targets for the year 2030:

- Reduce GHG emission by 55 percent from the level in 1990.
- Produce 45 percent of energy from renewables.
- Increase energy efficiency by 32.5% from a historical baseline.
- 14 percent renewable fuels in the transport sector.
- CO_{2} emissions per kilometer from passenger cars sold in the EU must decrease by an average of 37.5 percent from 2021 levels.
- 14 percent of the fuel in the transport sector must be renewable.

Target for the year 2035:

- Phase-out of fossil fuel vehicles in new car sales, including plug-in hybrid electric vehicles.

Target for the year 2050:

- On 9 December 2025, the European Union Parliament announced a provisional political agreement of a 90% reduction target for greenhouse gas emissions by 2040 compared with 1990 levels, to achieve net-zero emissions in the EU by 2050.

=== Policies and legislation for mitigation ===
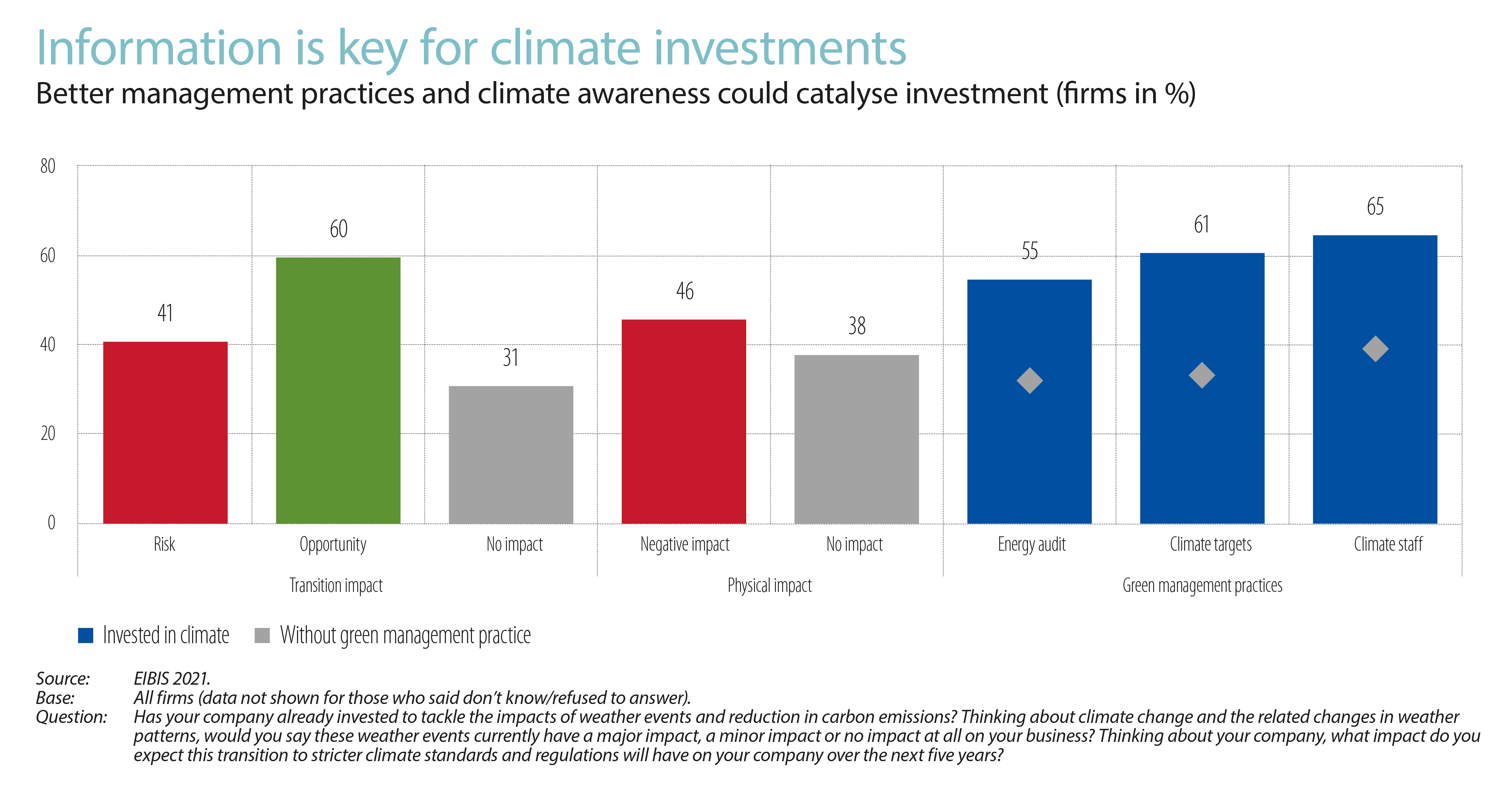
Expectations of consequences of stricter climate standards and regulations for EU firms.

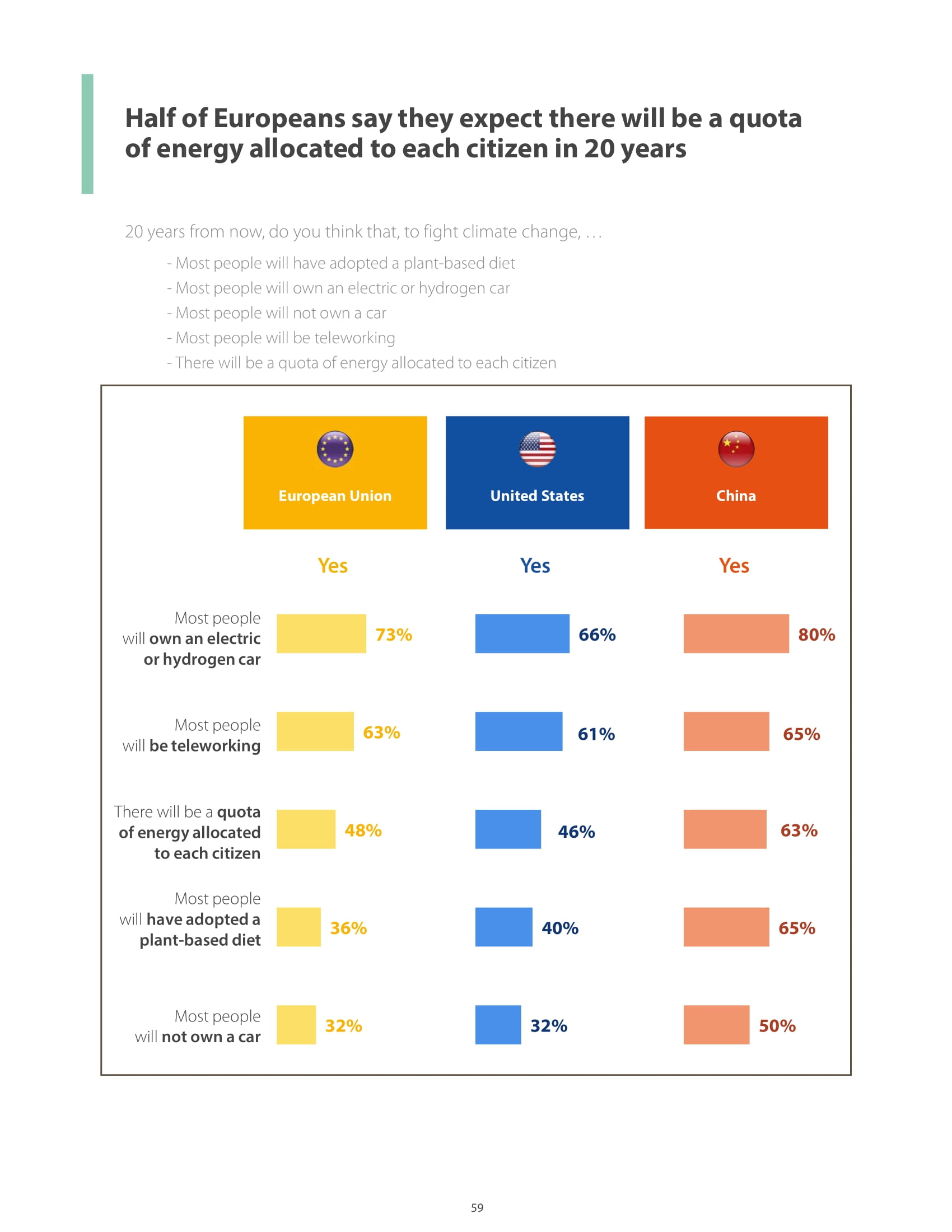
In the climate survey of 2021–2022, half of Europeans say they expect there will be a quota of energy allocated to each citizen in 20 years.

There is in place national legislation, international agreements and EU directives. The EU directive 2001/77/EU promotes renewable energy in electricity production. The climate subprogramme will provide €864 million in co-financing for climate projects between 2014 and 2020. Its main objectives are to contribute to the shift towards a low carbon and climate resilient economy and improve the development, implementation and enforcement of EU climate change policies and laws.

In March of the year 2020 a draft of a climate law for the entire European Union was proposed. The law obliges the European Union to become carbon neutral by 2050 and adjust all its policies to the target. The law includes measures to increase the use of trains. The law includes a mechanism to check the implementation of the needed measures. It also should increase the climate ambitions of other countries. It includes a Carbon Border Adjustment Mechanism, that will prevent Carbon leakage. Greta Thunberg and other climate activists have criticized the draft saying it has not enough strong targets.

In July 2021 the European Union published several drafts describing concrete measures to achieve climate neutrality by 2050. Those include tax on jet fuel, a ban on selling cars on petrol and diesel by 2035, border tax, measures for increase energy efficiency in buildings and renewable energy.

Climate initiatives, according to 56% of Europeans, are a source of economic growth. 56% of Europeans also believe that climate change mitigation will produce more employment. 61% of Europeans believe that climate change policies will improve their quality of life.

In May 2022 the European Commission proposed a plan that includes measures for speeding emission reduction. The plan includes reducing energy consumption by 13% by the year 2030, reducing oil and gas use by 5% with behavioural changes already in the short time, increase use of biogas and heat pumps. According to the plan, 45% of energy in the European Union should come from renewable sources by 2030.

In the summer of 2022 the leaders of the union adopted basic elements of the proposition of the European Commission aiming to reduce the emissions of the union by 61% by the year 2030.

The European Commission predicted in 2020 that extra investment of €260 billion year, or around 2% of EU GDP, would be needed to meet the 2030 climate and energy objectives. Since then, the aim for reducing greenhouse gas emissions for the year 2030 has grown (from -40% to -55%), necessitating both more investment and the acceleration of some expenditures.

An increase in natural disasters and damage to the environment are the biggest climate change-related concerns for Europeans surveyed by the European Investment Bank (2020–2021).

Approximately 57% of EU businesses are investing in energy efficiency, 64% in reducing and recycling trash, and 32% in less polluting industries and technologies. Roughly 40% of businesses made investments in energy efficiency in 2021. About 90% of EU businesses previously made an effort to cut greenhouse gas emissions. In 2023, physical climate change risks were found to affect around 64% of EU businesses, with just 36% of those businesses taking action to adapt to these risks, through investments in preventing or limiting exposure. Only 13% of businesses purchased insurance to deal with climate-related losses. The largest proportion of firms citing weather events as affecting their operations was found in Spain, with 80%, Portugal 79% and Italy 73%. Denmark, Luxembourg and Latvia (firms) were found to have the fewest weather events affecting them.

The Netherlands has the largest share of companies that have already invested in addressing climate change in the European Union, while Lithuania has the highest share of firms planned to invest in the next three years (following 2023). Cyprus and Greece have the lowest percentage of enterprises in terms of both investments made and planned investments.

The European Union's key efforts are investments in energy efficiency (59%) and trash minimization and recycling (67%).

==== European Union Emissions Trading System ====
The European Union Emissions Trading System is a major pillar of EU energy policy. It was the first large greenhouse gas emissions trading scheme in the world and was launched in 2005 to fight global warming. In 2022, the EU ETS covers emissions from power and heat generation, energy-intensive industrial sectors and commercial aviation within Europe.

Under the "cap and trade" principle, a maximum (cap) is set on the total amount of greenhouse gases that can be emitted by all participating installations. EU Allowances for emissions are then auctioned off or allocated for free, and can subsequently be traded. Installations must monitor and report their CO_{2} emissions, ensuring they hand in enough allowances to the authorities to cover their emissions. If emission exceeds what is permitted by its allowances, an installation must purchase allowances from others. Conversely, if an installation has performed well at reducing its emissions, it can sell its leftover credits. This allows the system to find the most cost-effective ways of reducing emissions without significant government intervention. The current EU ETS cap aims to reduce GHG emissions by 43% in 2030 against 2005 emissions, but in the "Fit for 55" package, the EU commission proposes to increase the reduction target for 2030 to -61% compared to 2005 emissions.

==== Stern report 2006 ====
British government and economist Nicholas Stern published the Stern report in 2006. The Review states that climate change is the greatest and widest-ranging market failure ever seen, presenting a unique challenge for economics. The Review provides prescriptions including environmental taxes to minimize the economic and social disruptions. The Stern Review's main conclusion is that the benefits of strong, early action on climate change far outweigh the costs of not acting. The Review points to the potential effects of climate change on water resources, food production, health, and the environment. According to the Review, without action, the overall costs of climate change will be equivalent to losing at least 5% of global gross domestic product (GDP) each year, now and forever. Including a wider range of risks and effects could increase this to 20% of GDP or more.

No-one can predict the consequences of climate change with complete certainty; but we now know enough to understand the risks. The review leads to a simple conclusion: the benefits of strong, early action considerably outweigh the costs.

==== Climate emergency ====
The EU parliament declared a climate emergency in November 2019. It urged all EU countries to commit to net zero greenhouse gas emissions by 2050. MEPs backed a tougher target of cutting greenhouse gas emissions by 55% by 2030. The vote came as scientists warned that the world may have already crossed a series of climate tipping points, resulting in "a state of planetary emergency". The parliament also calls to end all fossil fuel subsidies by 2020, increase at least twice the payments to the green climate fund, make sure that all the legislation and the European budget will be in line with the 1.5 degrees target, and reduce emissions from aviation and shipping.

==== Divestment from fossil fuels and sustainable investments ====
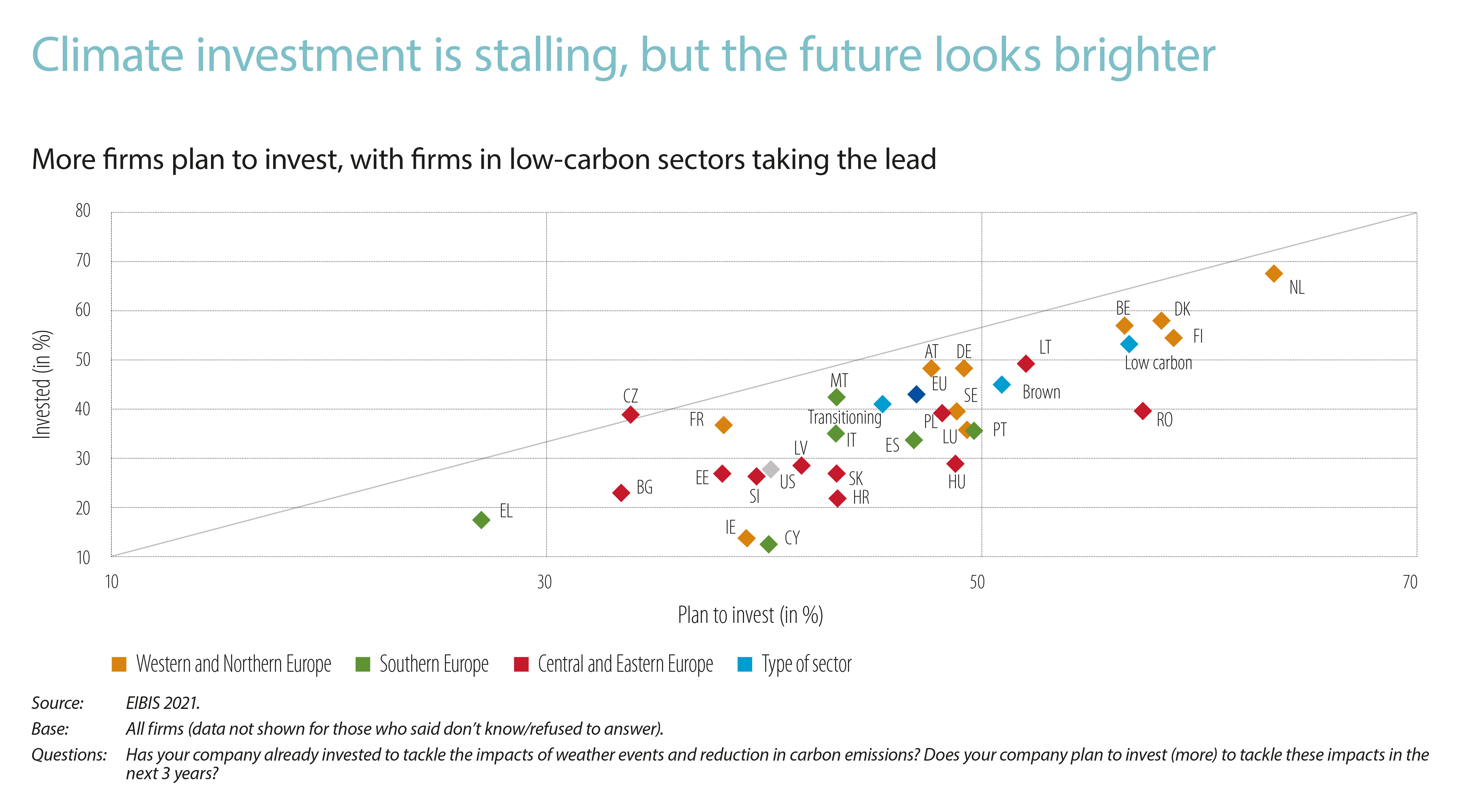
More firms are planning investments in climate change mitigation as of 2021.

The European Investment Bank declared that it will divest almost completely from fossil fuels from the year 2021 and started to phase out acceptance of new projects in 2019.

The central bank of Sweden sold its bonds in the provinces of Queensland, Western Australia in Australia and the province Alberta from Canada because of severe climate effects from those provinces.

In November 2019, the European parliament adopted resolutions calling to end all subsidies of fossil fuels by 2020.

In 2019 the European Parliament created rules for identification of sustainable investments. The measure should help achieve climate neutral Europe.

27% of companies in less developed areas report that climate change is having a big effect on their business, while 40% have a slight effect. Only 19% and 43%, respectively, of businesses in transition zones claim that climate change is significantly affecting their business. Less developed regions also have the lowest percentage of businesses who have made investments to combat climate change or reduce their carbon emissions (46%).

==== Green recovery from the COVID-19 pandemic ====
In May 2020, the €750 billion European recovery package and the €1 trillion budget were announced, the European Green Deal being part of it. The money will be spent only on projects that meet some green criteria; 25% of all funding will go to climate change mitigation. Fossil fuels and nuclear power are excluded from the funding. The recovery package should also restore some equilibrium between rich and poor countries in the European Union. In July the recovery package and the budget were generally accepted, and budget allocation going to climate action was raised to 30%. The plan includes some green taxation on European products and on imports. Critics say it is still not enough for achieving the climate targets of the European Union and it is not clear how to ensure that all the money will really go to green projects.

==== Nature restoration and agriculture ====
In May 2020, the European Union published 2 plans that are part of the European Green Deal: The EU Biodiversity Strategy for 2030 and From Farm to Fork.

In the official page of the EU Biodiversity Strategy for 2030 is cited Ursula von der Leyen, President of the European Commission, saying that:

"Making nature healthy again is key to our physical and mental wellbeing and is an ally in the fight against climate change and disease outbreaks. It is at the heart of our growth strategy, the European Green Deal, and is part of a European recovery that gives more back to the planet than it takes away."

The biodiversity strategy is an essential part of the climate change mitigation strategy of the European Union. From the 25% of the European budget that will go to fight climate change, large parts will go to restore biodiversity and nature based solutions.

The EU Biodiversity Strategy for 2030 includes the next targets:

- Protect 30% of the sea territory and 30% of the land territory especially Old-growth forests.
- Plant 3 billion trees by the year 2030.
- Restore at least 25,000 kilometers of rivers, so they will become free flowing.
- Reduce the use of Pesticides by 50% by the year 2030.
- Increase Organic farming.
- Increase Biodiversity in agriculture.
- Give €20 billion per year to the issue and make it part of the business practice.

According to the page, approximately half of the global GDP depends on nature. In Europe many parts of the economy that generate trillions of Euros per year, depend on nature. Only the benefits of Natura 2000 in Europe are €200 - €300 billion per year.

In the official page of the program From Farm to Fork is cited Frans Timmermans the Executive Vice-president of the European Commission, saying that:

"The coronavirus crisis has shown how vulnerable we all are, and how important it is to restore the balance between human activity and nature. At the heart of the Green Deal the Biodiversity and Farm to Fork strategies point to a new and better balance of nature, food systems and biodiversity; to protect our people's health and well-being, and at the same time to increase the EU's competitiveness and resilience. These strategies are a crucial part of the great transition we are embarking upon."

The program include the next targets:

- Making 25% of EU agriculture organic, by the year 2030.
- Reduce by 50% the use of Pesticides by the year 2030.
- Reduce the use of Fertilizers by 20% by the year 2030.
- Reduce nutrient loss by at least 50%.
- Reduce the use of antimicrobials in agriculture and antimicrobials in aquaculture by 50% by 2030.
- Create sustainable food labeling.
- Reduce food waste by 50% by 2030.
- Dedicate to R&I related to the issue €10 billion.

In 2022 the Environment Ministers of the European Union backed a new law aiming to increase carbon sinks such as forests.

==== Forests ====
In 2022 the European parliament approved a bill aiming to stop the import linked with deforestation. The bill may cause to Brazil, for example, to stop deforestation for agricultural production and begun to "increase productivity on existing agricultural land". The legislation was adopted with some changes by the European Council in May 2023 and is expected to enter into force several weeks after. The bill requires companies who want to import certain types of products to the European Union to prove the production of those commodities is not linked to areas deforested after 31 of December 2020. It prohibits also import of products linked with Human rights abuse. The list of products includes: palm oil, cattle, wood, coffee, cocoa, rubber and soy. Some derivatives of those products are also included: chocolate, furniture, printed paper and several palm oil based derivates.

Wood harvesting and supply have reached around 550 million m3 per year, while the total increasing stock of European forests has more than quadrupled during the previous six decades. It now accounts for around 35 billion m3 of forest biomass. Since the beginning of the 1990s, the amounts of wood and carbon stored in European forests have increased by 50% due to greater forest area and biomass stocks. Every year, European woods adsorb and store around 155 million tonnes CO_{2} equivalent. This is comparable to 10% of all other sectors' emissions in Europe.

The forestry industry tries to mitigate climate change by boosting carbon storage in growing trees and soils and improving the sustainable supply of renewable raw materials via sustainable forest management.

==== Transport ====
The European Investment Bank's Climate Survey 2020 - 2021 found that in Europe, more people want public transport and electric cars to reduce emissions.

In 2022, the leaders of the union agreed to ban sales of cars emitting CO_{2} from the year 2035.

In December 2022 the European Commission approved a law forbidding flights on planes in France, if people can pass the distance on a train in 2.5 hours. Greenpeace demanded to extend the law, by following the advice of the European Commission to include connecting flights. Greenpeace cited a report according to which, if it will be 6 hours instead of 2.5, it will cut global greenhouse gas emissions by an amount equivalent to 3.5 million tonnes CO_{2} annually.

==== Policies against greenwashing and planned obsolescence ====
The European Parliament is advancing a set of rules intended to:

- Ban presenting the product as green without proof.
- Forbade claiming it is carbon neutral based solely on carbon offsets. Such claim will be approved only for residual emissions.
- Support making more durable products.
- Forbade presenting a product more durable than it is.

=== European Court of Human Rights ===
Verein KlimaSeniorinnen Schweiz v. Switzerland (2024) was a landmark European Court of Human Rights case in which the court ruled that Switzerland violated the European Convention on Human Rights by failing to adequately address climate change. It is the first case in which an international court has ruled that state inaction related to climate change violates human rights.

== Adaptation ==
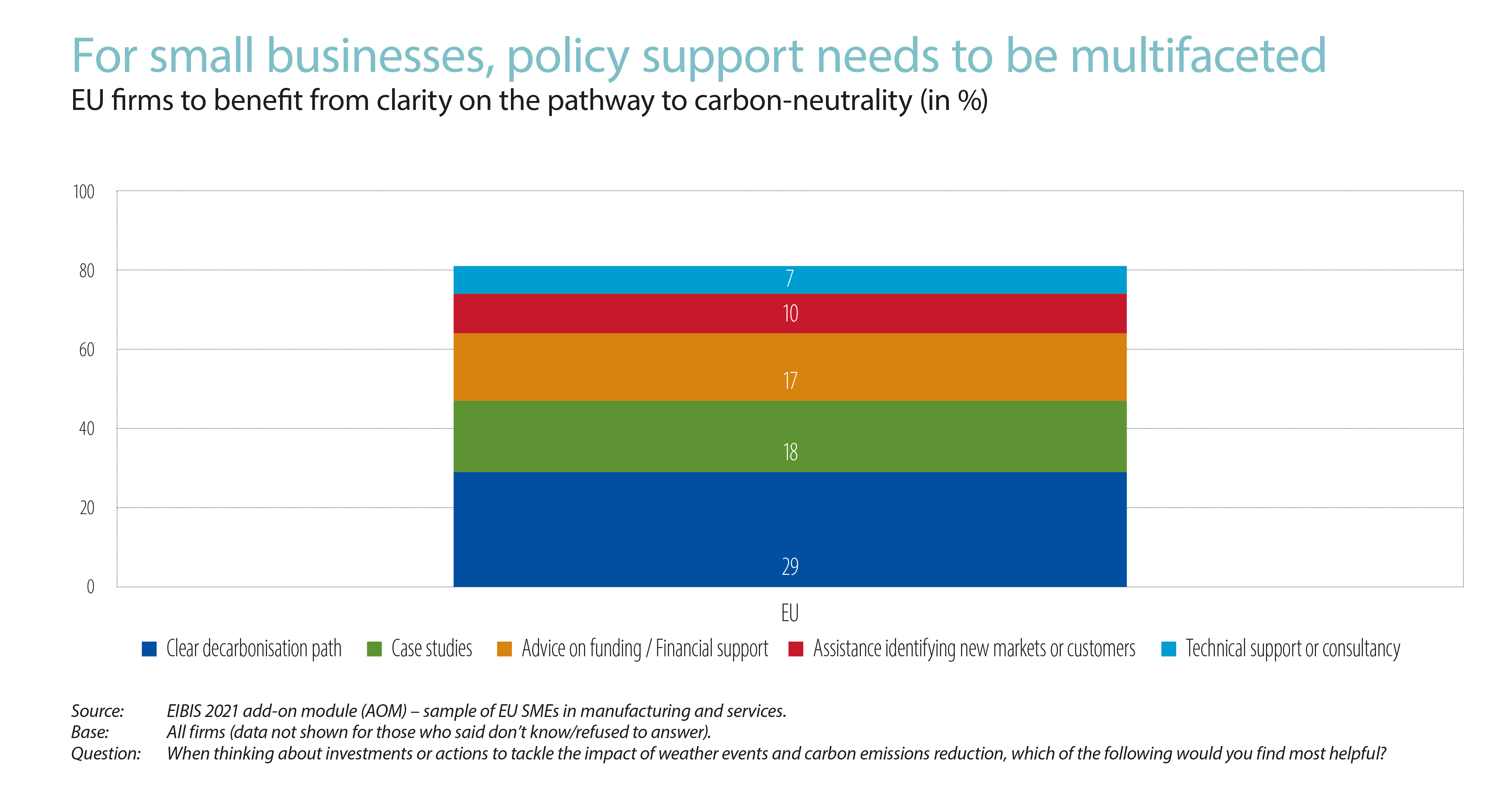
Small businesses in the EU want a clear decarbonization path available to achieve carbon-neutrality.

Climate change threatens to undermine decades of development gains in Europe and put at risk efforts to eradicate poverty. In 2013, the European Union adopted the 'EU Adaptation Strategy', which had three key objectives: (1) promoting action by member states, which includes providing funding, (2) promoting adaptation in climate-sensitive sectors and (3) research.

The Climate Adaptation Investment Advisory Platform (ADAPT) of the European Union helps the public and commercial sectors plan and invest in climate change adaptation and resilience efforts. The European Green Deal is another initiative that aims to make Europe the first climate-neutral continent by 2050. Accelerating the transition to a circular economy is one of the Green Deal's main cornerstones.

== Society and culture ==
=== Public opinion ===
Results of a 2020 European Investment Bank survey on the public opinion on climate change in the EU, United States and China.

33 percent of Europeans surveyed in the European Investment Bank's Climate Survey 2020 - 2021 think the biggest challenge their country is facing is climate change.

The majority of individuals in the eastern EU countries are relatively less positive about the influence of climate measures on the employment market. 55% of Eastern Europeans believe that measures against climate change will result in less jobs. In Western Europe, 60% of respondents believe that policies would generate more jobs. While seeking employment, an increasing number of people are looking at businesses' environmental credentials. Over two-thirds of Europeans (62%) believe that future employers should prioritize sustainability. It is even a high priority for 16% of Europeans.

62% of Europeans believe that the green transition will reduce their buying power.

66% of Europeans believe the climate emergency will be a severe problem by the mid-century, and 30% believe that the climate emergency will be under control by 2050.

Europeans believe climate change is a threat, with 29% of the EU population expecting to be forced to relocate to another area. People of ages 20–29 are concerned about the potential of having to relocate due to climate challenges. Because of climate change, 33% of Europeans feel they will have to relocate to a colder or warmer area or nation, according to the European Investment Bank's climate survey in 2020.

In European Investment Bank's Climate Survey of 2020, 90% of Europeans believe their children will experience the effects of climate change in their daily lives. The survey showed a high concern for the climate from the 30 000 individuals surveyed, explaining that a majority of respondents are also prepared to pay a new tax in accordance with climate laws. Only 9% of Europeans do not think climate change is occurring, compared to 18% in the United States.

=== Activism ===
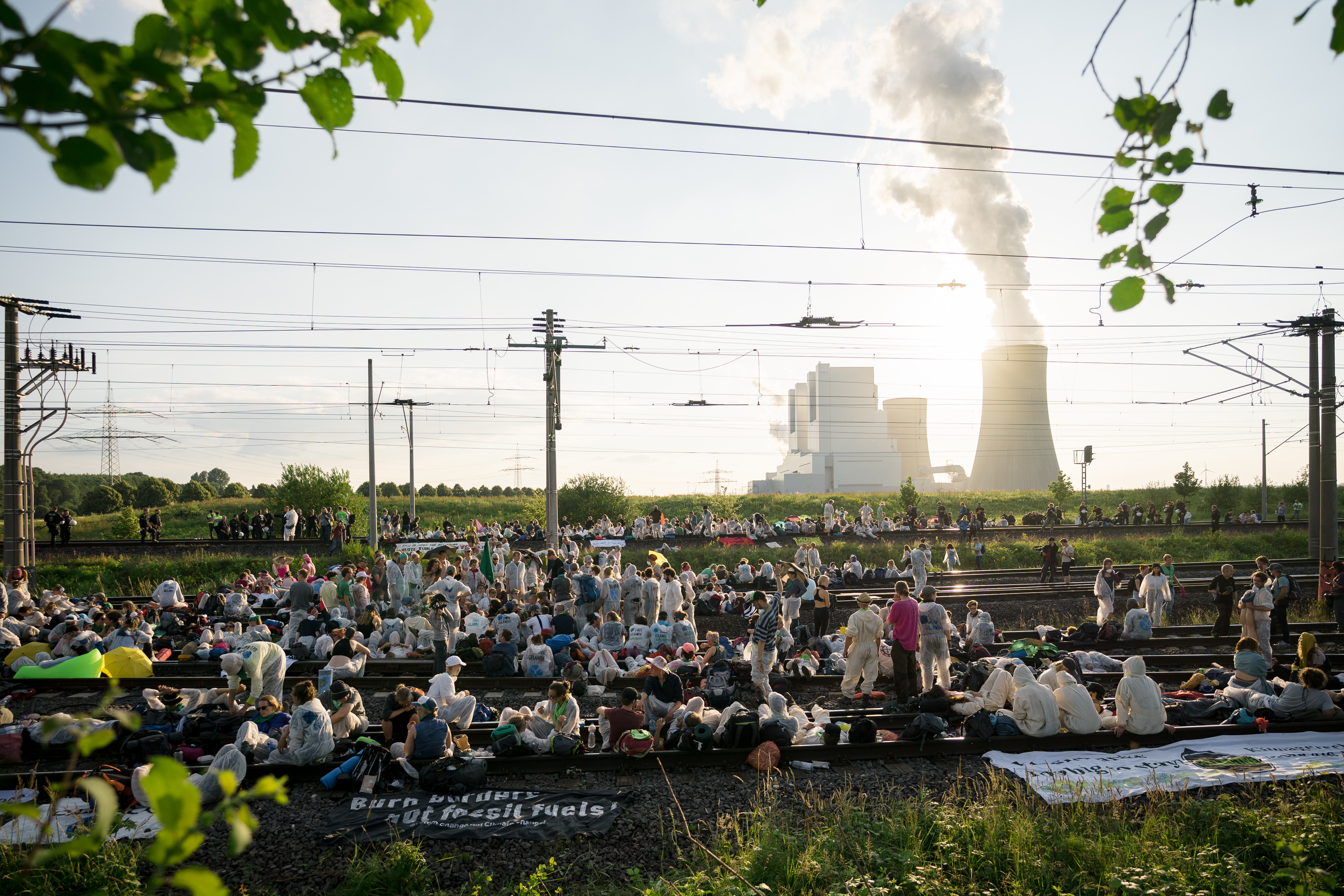
German climate activist group Ende Gelände holding a protest in 2019.

The critics include that European companies, like in other OECD countries, have moved the energy-intensive, polluting, and climate gas-emitting industry to Asia and South America. In respect to climate change there are no harmless areas. Carbon emissions from all countries are equal. The agreements exclude significant factors like deforestation, aviation and tourism, the actual end consumption of energy and the history of emissions. Negotiations are country oriented but the economical interests are in conflict between the energy producers, consumers and the environment.

In the EU, 75% of the population claims they are more worried about the climate crisis than their politicians. 51% of EU citizens cite government inaction as a major difficulty when facing the climate crisis, and 81% cite climate change as the most serious problem of the twenty-first century.

Climate change is also a factor when job searching, according to 54% of young Europeans.

As a form of climate action, 42% of Europeans, specifically 48% of women and 34% of men, invest in second-hand clothing rather than buying new. Younger populations, aged 15 to 29, were found more likely to do so than older generations.

33% of car buyers in Europe will also opt for a petrol / diesel car when purchasing a new vehicle. 67% of them mentioned opting for the hybrid or electric version. In the EU, only 13% of the total population do not plan on owning a vehicle at all.

44% of Europeans aged 20–29 fear they could lose their jobs because of climate change.

Europeans expect lifestyle changes to experience great transformation in the next 20 years. 31% of respondents to an EU climate survey believe that most people will no longer have their own vehicle. 63% believe that teleworking will become the norm in the fight against climate change. 36% of respondents believe most people will no longer consume animal products. 48% predict that energy quotas will be individually assigned. In 2024, 72% of respondents to the same survey acknowledge that they will need to adjust their lifestyle in response to climate change, with the figure rising to 81% among those in southern European countries.

==== School strike for climate ====
School strikes for climate became well known when the Swedish teen Greta Thunberg started to strike in the summer of 2018 and starting from September 2018 she began to strike every Friday. The movement started to pick up in January 2019 with mass strikes happened in Belgium, Germany and Switzerland. In the following months mass strikes were reported in numerous European countries. There were numerous global climate strikes that also took place in Europe on 15 March 2019, 24 May 2019, from 20 to 27 September 2019 (global climate action week), 29 November 2019 and 25 September 2020. The strikes during 2020 were limited because of COVID-19.

==== Extinction Rebellion ====
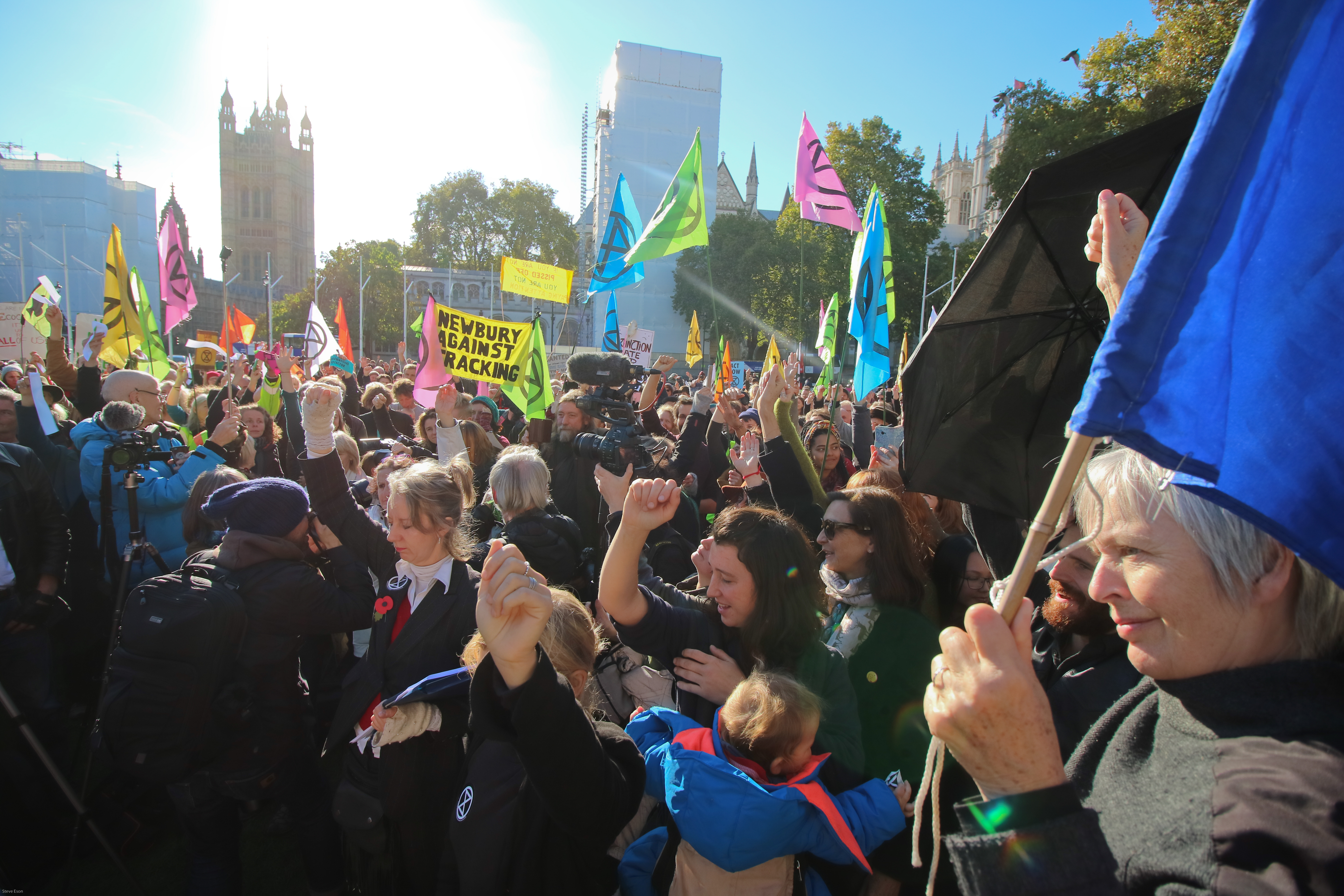
Extinction Rebellion protesting at Parliament Square, London in 2018.

Extinction Rebellion (XR) was founded in 2018 in the United Kingdom and is a civil disobedience movement. Their first planned action was in London were 5000 demonstrators blocked the most important bridges of the city. The movement quickly spread around Europe. In October 2019 there was the first global rebellion with numerous demonstrations in European cities.

=== EU Day for the Victims of the Global Climate Crisis ===
In 2023, the annual EU Day for the Victims of the Global Climate Crisis on 15 July was established in a joint declaration by European Parliament, European Council and European Commission.

== By country ==
The European Investment Bank's Climate Survey found that Southern and South-Eastern Europe sees more pronounced effects of climate change on everyday life than other locations

=== Austria ===
At the beginning of 2020, major parties in Austria reached a deal to achieve carbon neutrality by 2040. The plan included producing all electricity from renewable sources by 2030, implementing a nationwide carbon tax, and introducing a tax on flying while making train travel more attractive.

In 2020, the country's last coal-fired power station was closed, making Austria the second coal-free country in Europe after Belgium. The government officially adopted the goal of achieving 100% renewable electricity by 2030.

=== Belgium ===
Belgium has the 7th largest CO_{2} emission per capita in the EU. The CO_{2} emissions have dropped 19.0% since in comparison with 1990 levels. The average temperature has risen 1.9 degrees Celsius since measurements began in 1890, with an acceleration since 1954.

Climate change in Belgium has caused temperatures rises and more frequent and intense heatwaves, increases in winter rainfall and decreases in snowfall. By 2100, sea levels along the Belgian coast are projected to rise by 60 to 90 cm with a maximum potential increase of up to 200 cm in the worst-case scenario. The costs of climate change are estimated to amount to €9.5 billion a year in 2050 (2% of Belgian GDP), mainly due to extreme heat, drought and flooding, while economics gains due to milder winters amount to approximately €3 billion a year (0.65% of GDP). The country has committed to net zero by 2050.

=== Bosnia and Herzegovina ===
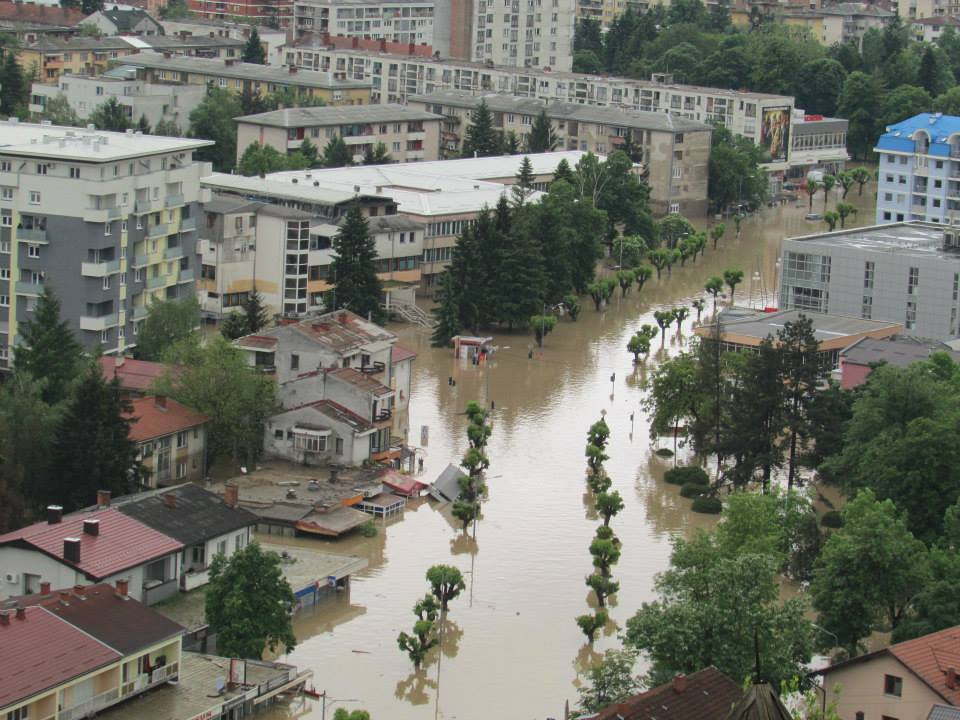
Floods in 2014 severely affected Bosnia and Herzegovina, as pictured in Doboj.

Bosnia and Herzegovina is considered vulnerable to climate change, with limited capacity to adapt. Between 1961 and 2016, the country's climate warmed and precipitation became more intense. The country has experienced extreme weather events, in particular a severe drought in 2012 and floods in 2014, which had severe economic consequences. Further consequences are expected as the global climate continues to warm. The agricultural sector, which forms a significant part of the economy and supports its majority rural population, is also being significantly affected. Tourism, energy production and consumption are also affected by climate change.

=== Croatia ===
Croatia aims to reduce CO_{2} emissions by 45% by 2030 and phase out coal by 2033. However, the shift to a low-carbon economy will necessitate significant expenditures in new energy infrastructure and additional renewable energy resources.

Croatia established a 2030 National Energy and Climate Plan to attain its aim. The national policy targets for a 36.4% renewable energy share by 2030, as well as major investment in the energy industry, including hydropower, wind farms, solar photovoltaic facilities, and hydrogen energy.

=== Cyprus ===
Climate change is predicted to lead to rising temperatures (along with other negative effects of climate change) at a swifter rate in Cyprus than many other areas of the planet. Cyprus is an island nation geographically situated in the Middle East, with low levels of rainfall.

=== Denmark ===
In 2019 Denmark passed a law in which its pledge to reduce GHG emissions by 70% by 2030 from the level in 1990. It also pledged to achieve zero emissions by 2050. The law includes strong monitoring system and setting intermediate targets every 5 years. It includes a pledge to help climate action in other countries and consider climate effects in diplomatic and economic relations with other countries.

Greenland is an autonomous territory within Denmark. In 2021 Greenland banned all new oil and gas exploration on its territory. The government of Greenland explained the decision as follows: "price of oil extraction is too high,"

=== Finland ===
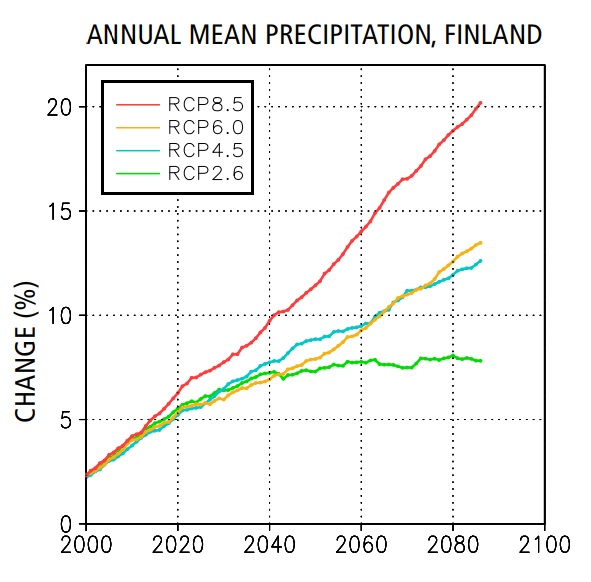
Annual mean precipitation (%) in Finland in 2000–2085 compared to the average values in 1971–2000, under different Representative Concentration Pathways scenarios.

Climate change has far-reaching consequences on the natural environment and people of Finland. Finland was among the top five greenhouse gas emitters in 2001, on a per capita basis. Emissions increased to 58.8 million tonnes in 2016. Finland needs to triple its current cuts to emissions in order to be carbon neutral by 2035. Finland relies on coal and peat for its energy, but plans to phase out coal by 2029. Finland has a target of carbon neutrality by the year 2035 without carbon credits. The policies include nature conservation, more investments in trains, changes in taxation and more sustainable wood burning. After 2035 Finland will be carbon negative, meaning soaking more carbon than emitting.

=== France ===
In France, climate change has caused some the greatest annual temperature increases registered in any country in Europe. The 2019 heat wave saw record temperatures of 46.0 °C. Heat waves and other extreme weather events are expected to increase with continued climate change. Other expected environmental effects include increased floods due to both sea level rise and increased glacier melt. These environmental changes will lead to shifts in ecosystems and affect local organisms. Climate change will also cause economic losses in France, particularly in the agriculture and fisheries sectors.

The Paris Agreement on climate change, under France's presidency, was negotiated and agreed in 2015 at COP21. France subsequently set a law to have a net zero atmospheric greenhouse gas emission (carbon neutrality) by 2050. Recently, the French government has received criticism for not doing enough to combat climate change, and in 2021 was found guilty in court for its insufficient efforts.

=== Germany ===
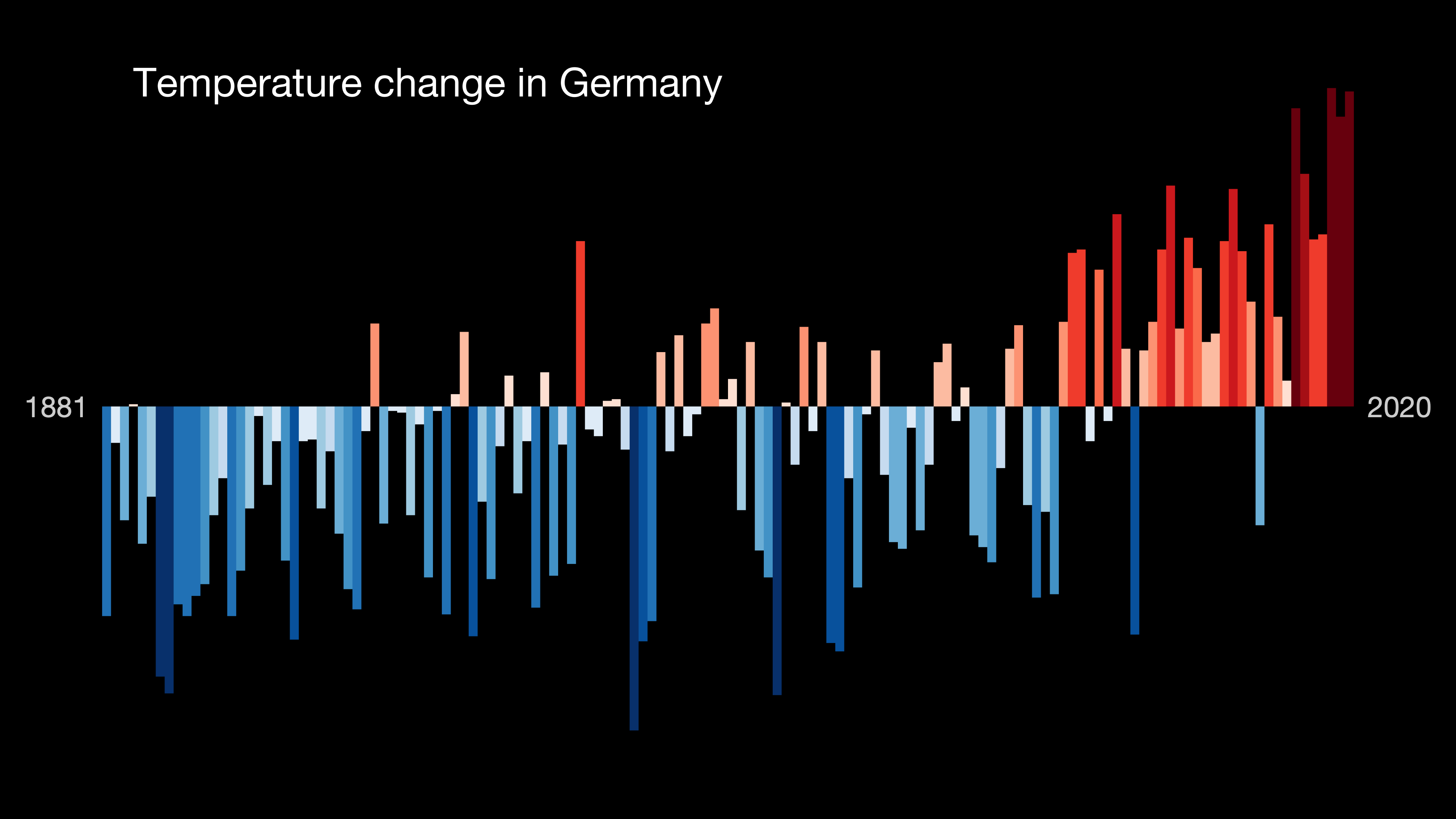
Graph showing average annual temperature change in Germany, 1881 to 2020

Climate change is leading to long-term effects on agriculture in Germany, more intense heatwaves and Cold waves, flash and coastal flooding, and reduced water availability. Debates over how to address these long-term challenges caused by climate change have also sparked changes in the energy sector and in mitigation strategies. Germany's energiewende ("energy transition") has been a significant political issue in German politics that has made coalition talks difficult for Angela Merkel's CDU.

Despite massive investments in renewable energy, Germany has struggled to reduce coal usage. The country remains Europe's largest importer of coal and produces the second most coal in the European Union behind Poland, about 1% of the global total. Germany phased out nuclear power in 2023, and plans to retire existing coal power plants by 2030. In 2024, Germany's greenhouse gas emissions decreased by 3% compared to the previous year, totaling 656 million metric tons of CO_{2} equivalent.

Climate change could cost Germany up to €900 billion by 2050 due to issues like extreme heat, drought, and floods. These events have already caused significant economic losses, with at least €145 billion in damages between 2000 and 2021.

German climate change policies started to be developed in around 1987 and have historically included consistent goal setting for emissions reductions (mitigation), promotion of renewable energy, energy efficiency standards, market based approaches to climate change, and voluntary agreements with industry. In 2021, the Federal Constitutional Court issued a landmark climate change ruling, which ordered the government to set clearer targets for reducing greenhouse gas emissions.

=== Iceland ===
Iceland has a target of becoming carbon neutral by 2040. It wants to reduce its greenhouse gas emissions by 40% by the year 2030.

=== Ireland ===
Climate change may have a range of effects in Ireland. Increasing temperatures may change weather patterns, with the potential for increased heatwaves, rainfall and storm events, with subsequent effects on people through flooding Climate change has been assessed to be the single biggest threat to Ireland, according to the head of the Defence Forces of Ireland, Mark Mellett.

=== Italy ===
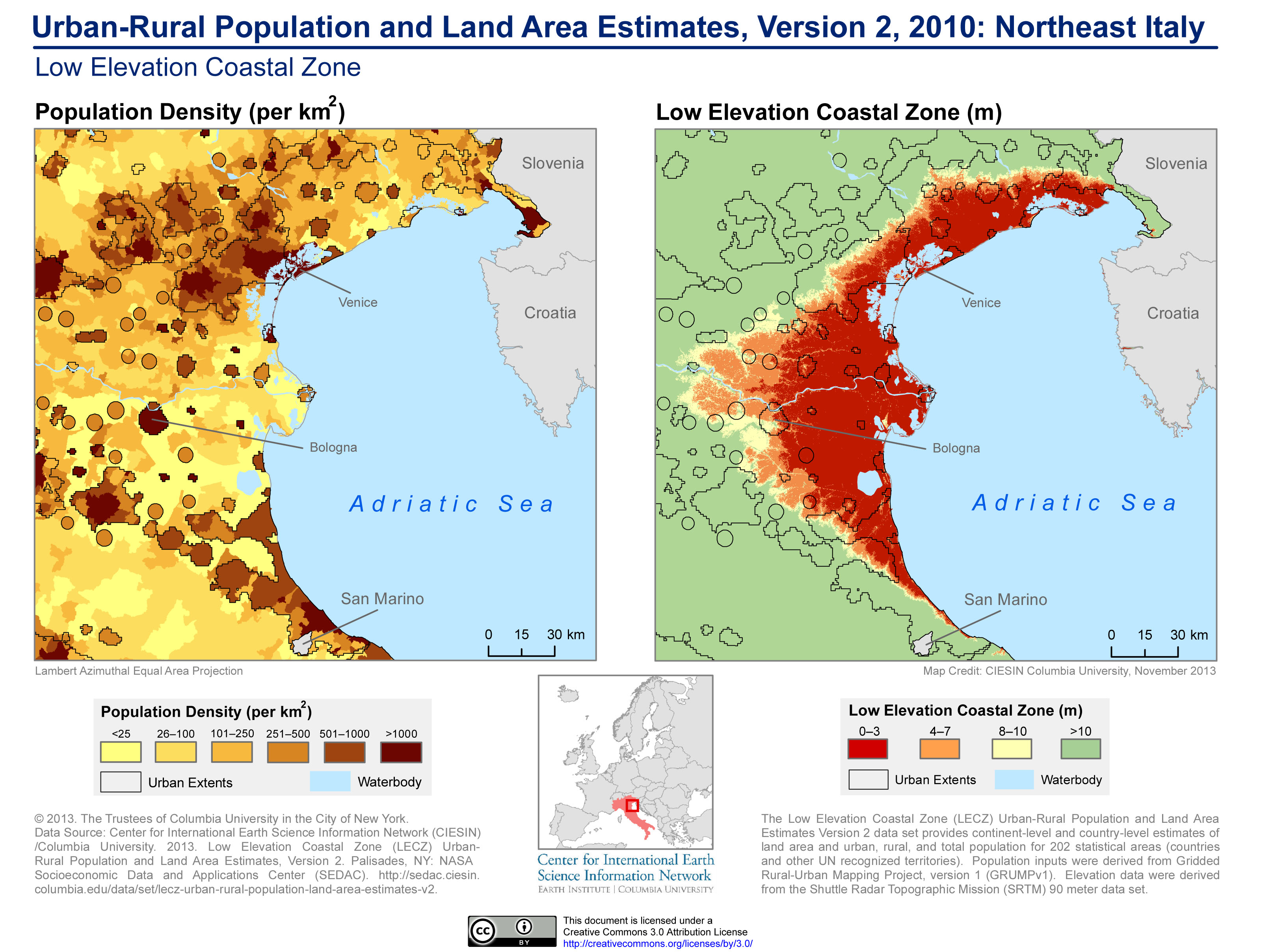
Population density and altitude above sealevel in Northeast Italy (2010)

In 2019, Italy became the first country in the world to introduce mandatory lessons about sustainability and climate change. The lessons are taught in all schools, in the ages 6 –19, one hour each week. According to the European Investment Bank climate survey from 2020, 70% of Europeans have either switched to a green energy supplier or are prepared to do so. This ratio is 82% in Italy.

=== Netherlands ===
The Netherlands is already affected by climate change. The average temperature in the Netherlands rose by more than 2 °C from 1901 to 2020. Climate change has resulted in increased frequency of droughts and heatwaves. Because significant portions of the Netherlands have been reclaimed from the sea or otherwise are very near sea level, the Netherlands is very vulnerable to sea level rise.

The Netherlands has the fourth largest greenhouse gas emissions per capita of the European Union, in part due to the large number of cows. The Dutch government has set goals to lower emissions in the next few decades. The Dutch response to climate change is driven by a number of unique factors, including larger green recovery plans by the European Union in the face of the COVID-19 and a climate change litigation case, State of the Netherlands v. Urgenda Foundation, which created mandatory climate change mitigation through emissions reductions 25% below 1990 levels. In 2021 CO_{2} emissions were down 14% compared to 1990 levels. The goal of the Dutch government is to reduce emissions in 2030 by 49%.

=== Norway ===
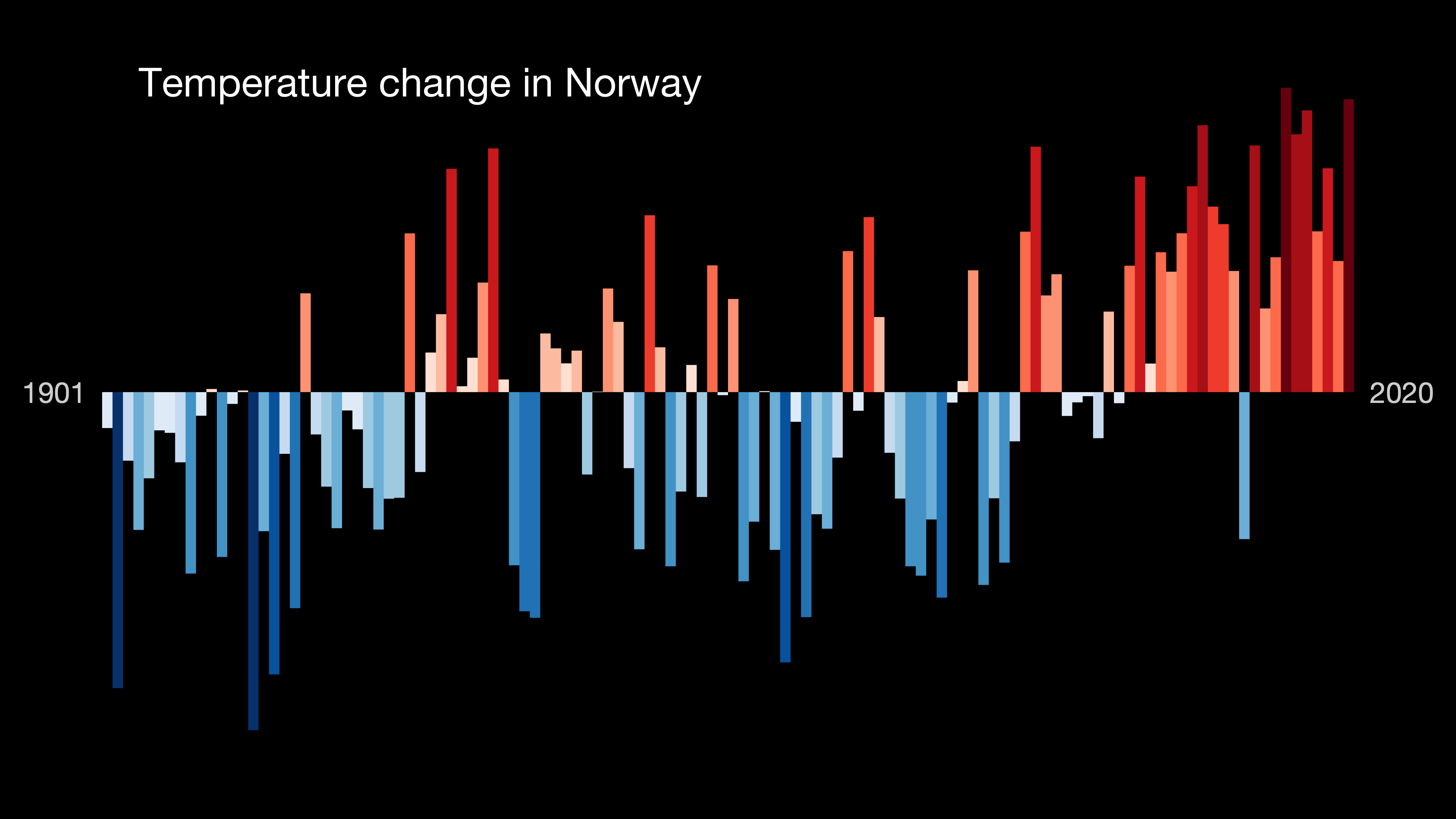
Visualisation of average annual temperature anomaly in Norway, 1901 to 2020.

All regions and seasons of Norway are expected to become warmer and wetter due to climate change.

=== Portugal ===
Portugal is beginning to promote climate action and support UN Sustainable Development Goals through various projects. Portugal Blue is a collaboration formed in October 2020 by the EIB Group, Banco Português de Fomento, and the Portuguese government (via Fundo Azul) to boost investment in the blue economy. The cooperation seeks to raise approximately €80 million in finance from public and institutional investors via venture capital and private equity funds, focused on blue economy funds that are entirely focused on ocean sustainability and climate action.

=== Russia ===
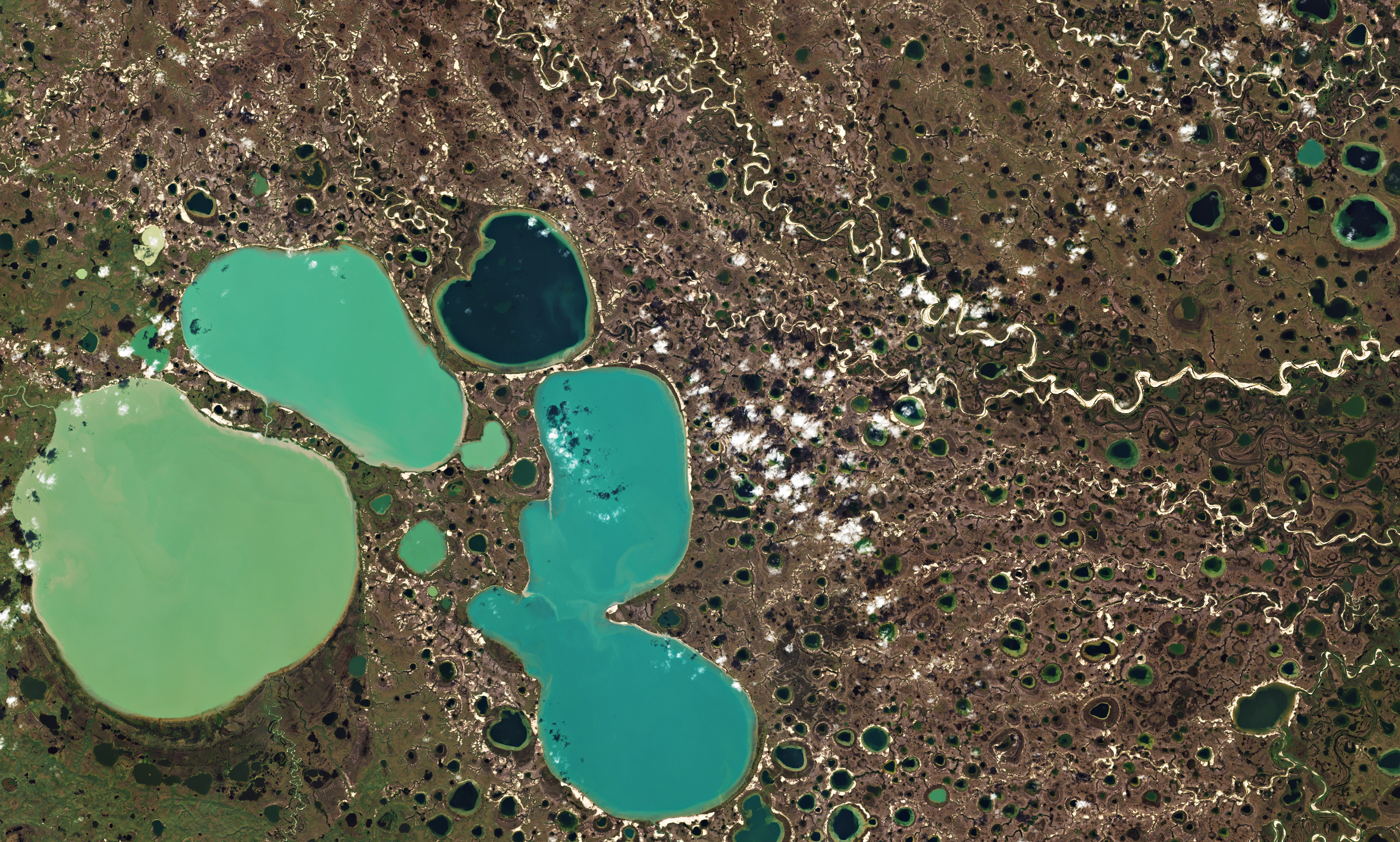
Ponds due to permafrost thaw

Climate change has serious effects on Russia's climate, including average temperatures and precipitation, as well as permafrost melting, more frequent wildfires, flooding and heatwaves. Changes may affect inland flash floods, more frequent coastal flooding and increased erosion reduced snow cover and glacier melting, and may ultimately lead to species losses and changes in ecosystem functioning.

=== Sweden ===
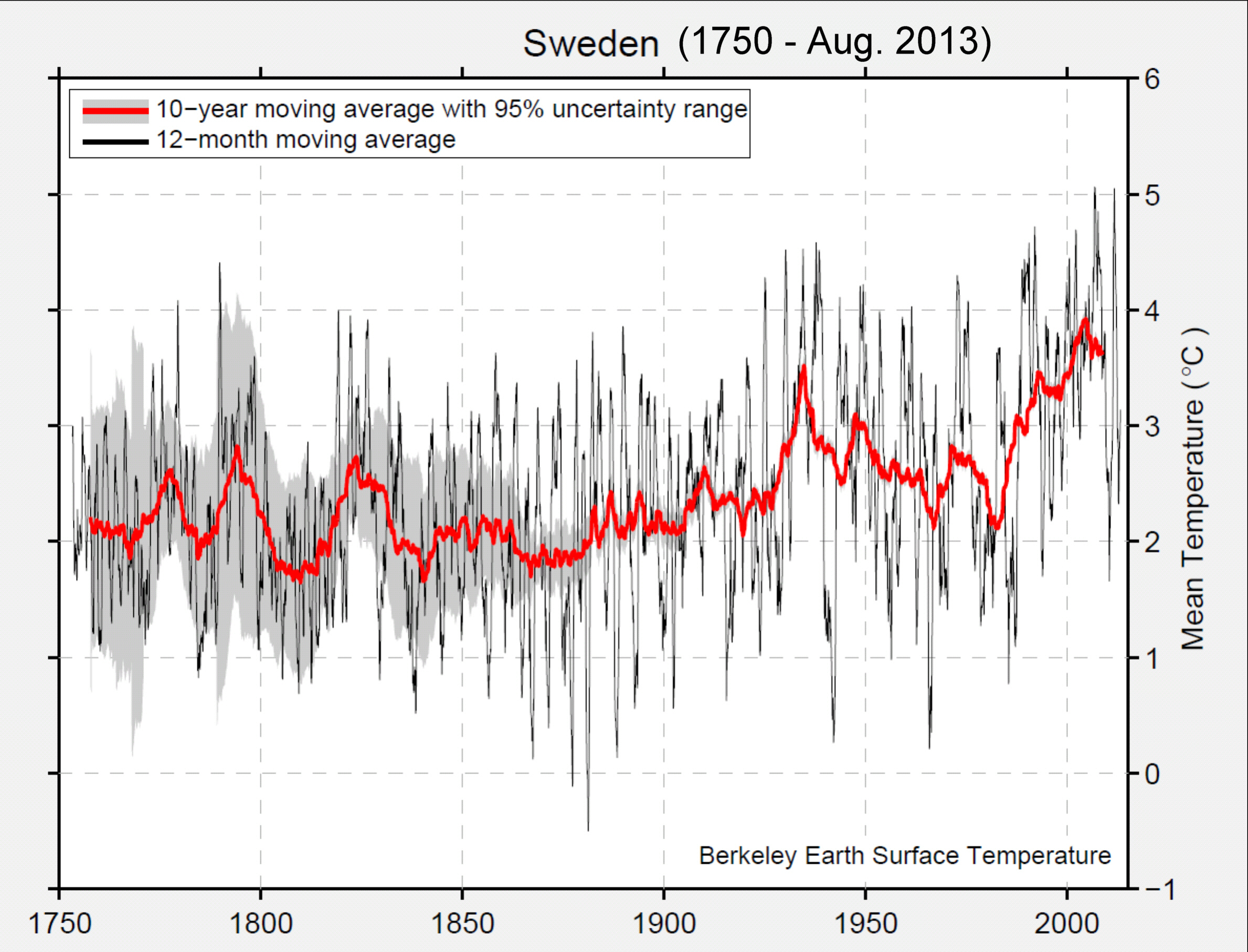
Temperature rise in Sweden's climate (1750–2013)

Climate change has received significant scientific, public and political attention in Sweden. In 1896, Swedish chemist Svante Arrhenius was the first scientist to quantify global heating. Sweden has a high energy consumption per capita, but reducing the dependency on fossil energy has been on the agenda of cabinets of the Governments of Sweden since the 1970s oil crises. In 2014 and 2016, Sweden was ranked #1 in the Global Green Economy Index (GGEI), because the Swedish economy produces relatively low emissions. Sweden has had one of the highest usages of biofuel in Europe and aims at prohibiting new sales of fossil-cars, including hybrid cars, by 2035, and for an energy supply system with zero net atmospheric greenhouse gas emissions by 2045.

=== Spain ===
Climate change has caused temperatures in the world to rise in the last few decades, and temperatures in Europe have risen twice as fast as the average change in the rest of the world. In Spain, which already has a hot and dry climate, extreme events such as heatwaves are becoming increasingly frequent. The country is also experiencing more episodes of drought and increased severity of these episodes. Water resources will be severely affected in various climate change scenarios. Also, the mediterranean climate (Köppen: Csa), as well as other temperate climates in the country, is becoming less and less common, being replaced by the semi-arid climate (Köppen: BSk/BSh) and even the expansion of desert regions. Some forecasts indicate that the semi-arid climate will be the most common in Spain by 2050.

To mitigate the effects of climate change, Spain is promoting an energy transition to renewable energies, such as solar and wind energy. In 2021, to support this process, the government approved a law on climate change and energy transition.

Spanish society as a whole is one of the most climate change conscious societies in the EU. Due to the effects of global warming, Spanish society is demanding stronger measures.

=== Turkey ===
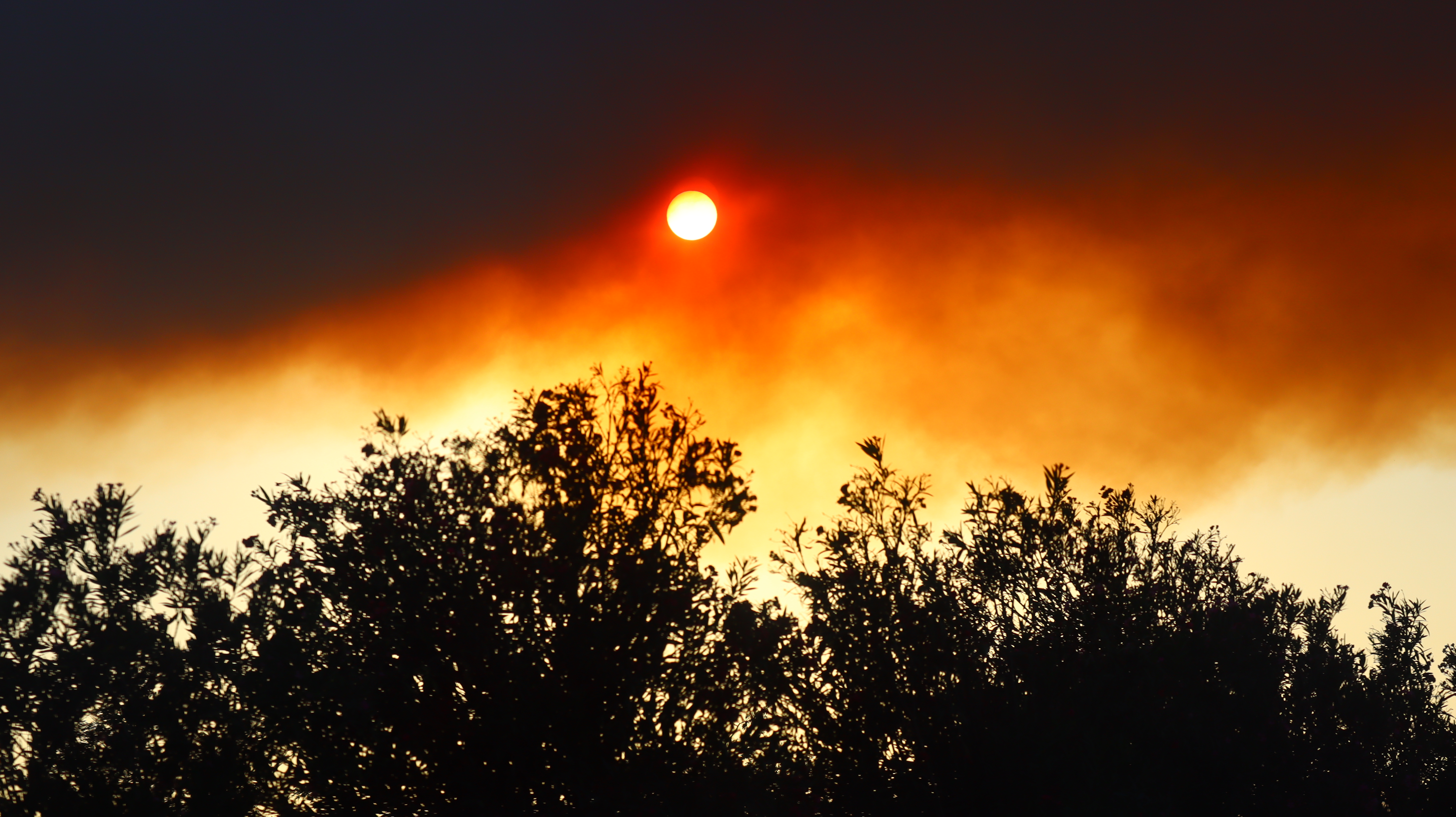
Smoke from a wildfire in July 2025: heatwaves are more frequent and longer

Heatwaves and droughts in Turkey are the main hazards due to its climate getting hotter. The temperature has risen in the 21st century, exceeding 50 °C (122 °F) in 2025, and there is more extreme weather. Due to differing geography effects vary across the country. Water supply to some cities is threatened. Turkey will host the 2026 United Nations Climate Change Conference and Murat Kurum says that climate finance is the most important issue.

Turkey's annual greenhouse gas emissions are over 1% of the global total, and energy policy includes subsidizing both fossil gas and coal. Per person emissions since the late-2010s have varied around six and a half tonnes a year, which is about the global average. However historical emissions are less than 1% of the global total.

The Directorate of Climate Change co-ordinates adaptation to climate change, which has been planned for water resources by river basin, and for agriculture. Certificate caps in the emission trading system are unclear as of 2026. Housing is not energy efficient, the pathway to the 2053 net zero target is unclear, and there is no plan for coal phase-out.

=== Ukraine ===
The EU is trying to support a move away from coal.

=== United Kingdom ===
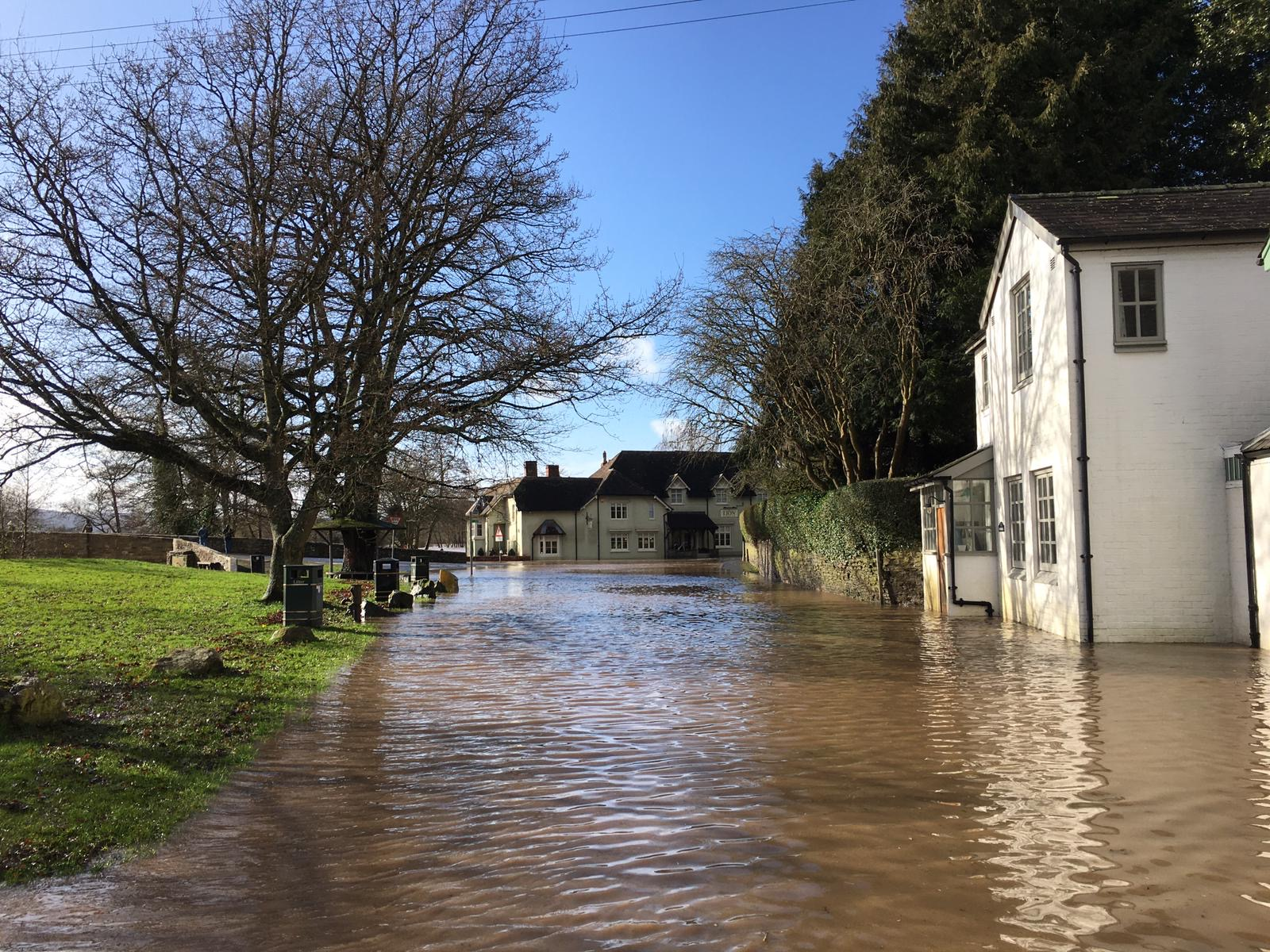
Climate change has increased the risk of flooding, as with Storm Dennis.

The United Kingdom's climate is changing, with hotter drier summers and warmer wetter winters. Storms, floods, droughts and heatwaves are becoming more frequent and intense, and sea level rise is affecting coastal areas. The UK is also a contributor to climate change, having emitted more greenhouse gas per person than the world average. Climate change is having economic effects on the UK and presents risks to human health and ecosystems.

== See also ==
- 2022 European drought
- 2023 European drought
- Climate of Europe
- Eco-Management and Audit Scheme
- Energy policy of the European Union
- Environmental policy of the European Union
- European Federation for Transport and Environment
- European Green Party
- European Pollutant Emission Register (EPER)
- European Union Emission Trading Scheme
- Greens–European Free Alliance
- List of European power companies by carbon intensity
- Plug-in electric vehicles in Europe
- Renewable energy in the European Union
