= Climate change in Malta =

Emissions, impacts and responses of Malta related to climate change

Climate change may have a range of impacts in Malta. Increasing temperatures may change weather patterns, with the potential for increased heatwaves.

== Greenhouse gas emissions ==
Greenhouse gas emissions in Malta amount to 900,000 tonnes of carbon dioxide equivalent, which corresponds to 4.2 tonnes of carbon dioxide equivalent per person.

== Impacts of climate change ==
=== Drinking water supply ===
The drinking water of Malta supply would be significantly reduced partially due to climate change.

=== Flooding ===
Transport infrastructure in Malta will be significantly impacted by climate change.

== Policies ==
=== Climate Action Act (2015) ===
Climate Action Act
- Long title: To establish a framework for climate action.
- Assented to: 2015-07-07
- Status: Repealed

Through the Act, the government is required under Maltese law, to develop policies, programmes, and projects that address and support climate change mitigation, climate adaptation, and climate resilience.

The Act consolidated Malta's climate change commitments for the first time.

=== Climate Action Act (2024) ===
Climate Action Act
- Long title: AN ACT to establish a legal framework for climate action and to provide for the establishment of a body corporate to be known as the Climate Action Authority and to provide for any matter which is related or ancillary thereto.
- Assented to: 2024-10-04
- Status: In force

The Act established a Climate Action Authority, designed to push Malta towards meeting its climate goals as a watchdog and regulator.

The Act allows for penalties such as imprisonment of 4 years and up to €50,000 per day the offence continues to clearly breach legislation, with a maximum of €1,000,000.

== See also ==
- Climate change in the European Union
