= List of European countries by coal production =

The following is a list of European countries by coal production in 2014, based mostly on the Statistical Review of World Energy published in 2015 by British Petroleum, ranking nations with coal production larger than 0.05 percent of world production. Amounts are expressed in tonnes of oil equivalent.

Rank	Country/Region	Coal production (million tonnes of oil equivalent)	share of total (%)
—	World	3,933.4	100
—	European Union	151.4	3.9
1	Russia	170.9	4.3
3	Poland	55.0	1.4
4	Germany	43.8	1.1
5	Ukraine	31.5	0.8
6	Turkey	17.8	0.5
7	Czech Republic	17.3	0.4
8	United Kingdom	7.0	0.2
9	Greece	6.3	0.2
10	Bulgaria	5.2	0.1
11	Romania	4.4	0.1
12	Hungary	2.0	0.1
