= EU Day for the Victims of the Global Climate Crisis =

The annual EU Day for the Victims of the Global Climate Crisis is observed in the European Union on 15 July since 2023. Despite its name, it is not limited to the European Union but shall be a day of remembrance for the victims of the climate crises worldwide.

== Establishment ==
The day was established in a joint declaration by European Parliament, European Council and European Commission on 13 July 2023.

Before, a joint initiative by members of the political groups EPP, S&D, Renew, Greens/EFA and The Left titled "Motion for a resolution on a European Day for the victims of the global climate crisis" had been tabled on 13 June 2023. It was adopted without changes by the European Parliament by 395 votes to 109, with 31 abstentions, on 15 June 2023, inviting the European Council and the European Commission to back this initiative.

== Purpose ==
According to the declaration, its purpose is

[…] commemorating said victims in Europe and worldwide, and to raise awareness among stakeholders and the general public of concrete steps they can take at their level to contribute to prevent these disasters from happening in the first place and, be better prepared for and respond to climate disasters.

— Joint Declaration of an Annual EU Day for the Victims of the Global Climate Crisis

As supplementary material, a multi-page "Communication toolkit" was provided as a PDF file, which contained ideas and suggestions for people who want to become active on this day and raise awareness for the topic.

== Commemorations at EU level ==
=== 2023 ===
On occasion of the day's introduction in 2023, Frans Timmermans, signer of the declaration for the European Commission, visited regions in Belgium, Germany and the Netherlands which had been affected by the 2021 European floods.

=== 2024 ===
In 2024, a ceremony was held at the junction of Rue de l'Arbre Bénit, Rue du Prince Albert and Chaussée d'Ixelles in Ixelles, Brussels. According to the announcement for this day, among others Janez Lenarčič (European Commissioner for Crisis Management), Zakia_Khattabi (Belgian Minister of Climate, Environment, Sustainable Development and Green Deal) and Annelies Verlinden (Belgian Minister of the Interior, Institutional Reforms and Democratic Renewal) as well as the founder of Climate Justice for Rosa, Benjamin Van Bunderen Robberechts, were attending. As part of the event, a musical performance was planned with arrangements by David Van Reybrouck and Jef Neve, written by them in honor of the victims of the 2021 Belgian floods, and performed by Hanne Roos and Marlon Dek. Climate Justice for Rosa is a non-profit organization named after Rosa, a 15-year-old girl who drowned in these floods.

=== 2025 ===
In 2025 a central ceremony was held in front of the Berlaymont building in Brussels. It featured contributions from official side by Teresa Ribera (European Commission Executive Vice-President for a Clean, Just and Competitive Transition), Antonio Decaro (MEP and Chair of European Parliament’s Committee on Environment, Public Health and Food Safety) and Lars Aagaard (Danish Minister for Climate, Energy and Utilities). Citizens were represented by Benjamin Van Bunderen Robberechts from Climate Justice for Rosa. The event was streamed live on the European Commission's European Broadcasting Service (EBS) and is available for rewatch. Additionally, several local events took place across the EU, for example in Torrent (Spain), Pombal (Portgual) and Turnu Măgurele (Romania).

The "Communication toolkit", which had been provided on the first occurrence of the day has been updated and expanded for 2025.
