= Grande-Synthe climate case =

Commune de Grande-Synthe v. France is a lawsuit filed by the commune of Grande-Synthe against the Government of France, alleging that the government has not taken enough action to reduce greenhouse gas emissions to fulfill its commitments according to domestic and international law. In July 2021, the Conseil d'État ruled that the French government must take all necessary measures to reduce emissions by March 2022.

== Facts ==
In 2015, the European Union, including France as a member state, under the Paris Agreement, committed to reduce domestic greenhouse gas emissions by at least 40% compared to 1990 levels by 2030. This commitment was part of the EU's Intended Nationally Determined Contribution aimed at keeping the global temperature increase below 2°C.

Grande-Synthe, a small coastal city in northern France particularly vulnerable to climate change impacts, claims that the French government fails to take sufficient measures to lower greenhouse gas emissions in order inter alia to comply with the Paris Agreement, presenting its case to the Conseil d'État beginning in 2020. The Conseil d'État, France's highest administrative court, first declared the city's petition admissible. On the substance of the case, the court observed that despite the country’s commitment to reducing emissions as outlined in the Paris Agreement, France in the years since has consistently exceeded its self-imposed carbon budgets.

== Ruling ==
The Conseil d'État ruled in July 2021 that the French government must, before March 2022, take all necessary measures to achieve the objectives of the Paris Agreement. On May 15, 2023, the Conseil d’État found that its decision had not been sufficiently enforced, noting:

“The High Council on Climate (HCC) considered that there is a proven risk that the 2030 reduction target will not be met. As the HCC noted, out of the 25 emission reduction strategic directions established by the Government (national low carbon strategy or SNBC), only six benefitted from measures in line with the reduction trajectory that has been set, and four even involved measures with contrary effects, particularly in the transport, building, agriculture and energy sectors. The HCC thus stressed that there is a significant risk that the targets set for 2030 will not be met.”

The claimants asked the Conseil d’État for a fine of €50 million per six-month period of non-compliance. However, the Conseil d’État, considering the government’s past efforts by and those further anticipated, decided it was not necessary at this time to enforce this penalty. Instead, it chose to regularly monitor the government's compliance with its ruling.
