= Nuclear power in Turkey =

Nuclear power stations in Turkey (view)
Under construction
Proposed

Currently, Turkey has no operating commercial nuclear reactors. However, four VVER-1200 reactors at the Akkuyu Nuclear Power Plant, are currently under construction. The first one is expected to come online in 2026. The government is aiming for 20 GW of nuclear.

The nuclear power debate has a long history, with the 2018 construction start in Mersin Province being the sixth major attempt to build a nuclear power plant since 1960. Nuclear power has been criticised as very expensive to taxpayers.

Plans for Sinop Nuclear Power Plant and another at İğneada have stalled. The country is considering buying small modular reactors.

Turkey plans new reactors in Thrace and Sinop. By 2050, it aims to reach 20 GW of nuclear power capacity.

== History ==
=== Early years ===
Turkey's nuclear activities started soon after the first International Conference on the Peaceful Uses of Atomic Energy, held in Geneva in September 1955. In 1961, a 1 MW test reactor at Çekmece Nuclear Research and Training Center was commissioned for educational and research purposes. As stated by the World Nuclear Association, the first endeavour was a feasibility report in 1970 involving a 300 MWe facility. Then in 1973, the electricity authority agreed to construct a demonstration plant of 80 MWe. In 1976, Akkuyu, a site 45 kilometers west of the southern city Silifke, was chosen as the nuclear power plant site. The Prime Ministry Atomic Energy Authority issued a license for this place. An effort to develop multiple plants failed in 1980 due to a failure of ensuring financial guarantees by the government, that viewed coal plants in Turkey as more favorable. Turkey suspended work on nuclear plants due to the Chernobyl disaster that occurred in the Soviet Union in 1986. In 1988, the TEK Nuclear power plants Department was closed.

In 1993, a nuclear plant was included in the country's investment scheme. However, the revised bidding requirements were not issued until 1996. Bids were issued by Atomic Energy of Canada Limited, the Westinghouse Electric Company-Mitsubishi Heavy Industries consortium and the Framatome-Siemens consortium for a 2000 MWe plant at Akkuyu. The final bid deadline was in 1997, but the government postponed its several times, until the preparations were scrapped due to financial difficulties.

=== 2000s ===
In May 2004, the Minister of Energy and Natural Resources Hilmi Güler said "We will meet with the countries that produce these plants soon" and brought the issue of nuclear power plant back to the agenda. In his statement, Güler stated that the technical investigations on nuclear power plants are continuing and that negotiations will be held soon. Güler announced that the construction of the first power plant will begin in 2007. In 2006, the northern Turkish city of Sinop, located near the Black Sea, was designated to host a commercial nuclear power plant. According to World Nuclear Association, the Sinop site has the advantage of cooling the water temperature approximately 5-degree Celsius lower than those at Akkuyu, helping each thermal reactor to achieve approximately 1 percent greater power output. A 100 MWe demonstration plant was to be installed there. Subsequently, 5000 MWe of additional plants were to come into operation from 2012 onwards. For construction and service, a form of public-private partnership (PPP) has been anticipated. The government said it aimed to have a total of 4500 MWe of energy running from three nuclear power stations by the end of 2015. Talks were happening with AECL over two 750 MWe CANDU reactors. The pressurized water reactor was also favoured by the government. The first reactors, totalling some 5000 MWe, were to be installed at Akkuyu, as the location already was approved. At the same time, the licensing for Sinop was still progressing.

A new legislation on the construction and maintenance of nuclear power plants was enacted by the Turkish Parliament in 2007. The bill called for the establishment of requirements for the design and operation of the plants by the Turkish Atomic Energy Authority (TAEK). It enables the government to grant purchase guarantees to firms for the total energy produced in nuclear power plants. Waste control and decommissioning were also covered by the bill. Turkey started to be subjected to the Paris Convention on Third Party Liability in the Field of Nuclear Energy. Criteria for developers who will build and run nuclear power plants were issued soon after this legislation.

A civil nuclear deal with the United States came into effect in 2008, a nuclear cooperation deal with South Korea was established in June 2010, and two more deals were signed with China in 2012. The following year, the International Atomic Energy Agency (IAEA) performed the Integrated Nuclear Infrastructure Review (INIR) in Turkey to evaluate the country's advancement in the planning for a new nuclear power scheme. Although the review was positive, the IAEA advised Turkey to complete the national nuclear energy strategy and to improve the regulating agency.

In July 2025, commissioning began for the first reactor unit of Türkiye’s Akkuyu Nuclear Power Plant, the country’s first NPP. The 1,200 MW unit completed construction and entered trial operations, with plans to connect it to the grid later in the year. Once fully operational, the plant is expected to supply 10% of Türkiye’s electricity and support its 2053 net-zero emissions target.

== Regulation and policy ==
In 2007, a bill concerning construction and operation of nuclear power plants and the sale of their electricity was passed by parliament. It also addresses waste management and decommissioning, providing for a National Radioactive Waste Account and a Decommissioning Account, which generators will pay into progressively.

The International Atomic Energy Agency (IAEA) has recommended "enacting a law on nuclear energy which establishes an independent regulatory body and putting a national policy in place that covers a wide range of issues, as well as further developing the required human resources".

In 2018, Turkey created the Nuclear Regulatory Authority. It took over most of the duties of Turkish Atomic Energy Authority (TAEK) like issueing licenses and permits to companies operating nuclear energy and ionizing radiation facilities. TAEK was renamed as TENMAK, and it is now exclusively liable for the management of radioactive waste. According to a scholar, providing concessions for nuclear power plants via international agreements rather than competitive tenders means such projects cannot be challenged in the constitutional court.

== Research and development ==
Since 1979, a TRIGA research reactor has been running at the Istanbul Technical University named the ITU TRIGA Mark-II Training and Research Reactor. It is supervised by the Turkish Atomic Energy Authority (TAEK). It is the second operational and third installed nuclear research reactors in Turkey, the other being the Çekmece Nuclear Research and Training Center.

== Power plants ==
=== Akkuyu Nuclear Power Plant ===
The Akkuyu Nuclear Power Plant (Turkish: Akkuyu Nükleer Güç Santrali) is a large nuclear power plant in Turkey under construction in Akkuyu, Büyükeceli, Mersin Province. It is expected to generate around 10% of the country's electricity when completed. The official launch ceremony took place in April 2015, and the first reactor is expected to come online in 2026 after a three year delay.

In May 2010, Russia and Turkey signed an agreement that a subsidiary of Rosatom would build, own, and operate a power plant in Akkuyu comprising four 1,200 MWe VVER1200 units. Construction of the first reactor commenced in April 2018. In February 2013, Russian nuclear construction company Atomstroyexport (ASE) and Turkish construction company Özdoğu signed the site preparation contract for the proposed Akkuyu Nuclear Power Plant. The contract includes excavation work at the site.

It is expected to be the first build–own–operate nuclear power plant in the world. Nuclear power operators get tax breaks until 2045.

== Berat Albayrak Period ==
While Turkey's nuclear journey, which started with Adnan Menderes in 1956, has been subject to obstacles for approximately 70 years due to different reasons, this national ideal; Akkuyu Nuclear Power Plant, which started in the 1970s and has not progressed for more than 40 years, was established within the scope of the National Energy Strategy put forward by Berat Albayrak, when he was the Minister of Energy and Natural Resources in 2017. In fact, the production license of Akkuyu Nuclear Power Plant was prepared and construction permit was granted in October 2017. Construction started with the groundbreaking ceremony held in April 2018.

It was reported that this project, which had not been started for over 70 years due to various reasons, had come to the groundbreaking process of the power plant as a result of the intensive efforts of the Minister of Energy and Natural Resources Berat Albayrak in his second year of duty at the Ministry of Energy.

Akkuyu Nuclear Reactor, with its 4800 MW installed power capacity and annual electricity production of 35 billion kWh, will meet 10% of Turkey's electrical energy needs alone and with its investment cost of 20 billion dollars, it is the largest project in the history of the Republic.

=== Sinop Nuclear Power Plant ===
The Sinop Nuclear Power Plant (Turkish: Sinop Nükleer Enerji Santrali) is a proposed nuclear plant in Turkey located at Sinop on the Black Sea. If constructed, it will be the country's second nuclear power plant after Akkuyu Nuclear Power Plant. In late 2025, a framework agreement with South Korean company KEPCO was signed.

=== İğneada Nuclear Power Plant ===
In 2013, Turkish Minister of Energy and Natural Resources, Taner Yıldız announced that the government was working on the plans of the third nuclear plant, which was projected to be built after 2023 under the management of Turkish engineers.

In 2015, it was announced that İğneada had been selected as the third site. Technology would have come from US based firm Westinghouse Electric Company in the form of two AP1000 and two CAP1400.

== Public opinion ==
=== Anti nuclear movement ===
There have been anti-nuclear protests in the past, for example in April 2006, plans to build a nuclear reactor on the Ince peninsula caused a large anti-nuclear demonstration in the Turkish city of Sinop. Greenpeace, who have expressed concerns over earthquakes and the ability of the authorities to protect the public, have opposed these proposals. There are concerns that no site for the waste has yet been selected. In 2022 an opposition MP in Mersin said he was against Akkuyu because it is 51% owned by Russia.

== Economics ==
Financing is provided by Russian investors, with 93% from a Rosatom subsidiary. Up to 49% of shares may be sold later to other investors.

Turkish Electricity Trade and Contract Corporation (TETAS) has guaranteed the purchase of 70% power generated from the first two units and 30% from the third and fourth units over a 15-year power purchase agreement. Electricity will be purchased at a price of 12.35 US cents per kW·h and the remaining power will be sold in the open market by the producer. According to energy analysts this price is high.

According to President Erdoğan nuclear power will make the country more economically independent. Although it will be technically possible to ramp power up and down, because fuel is a small part of the cost and operating costs remain the same there is almost no economic benefit in load-following, therefore nuclear is expected to supply baseload power. For baseload power levelized cost of electricity (LCOE) and value-added LCOE (VALCOE) are the same. In 2020 Shura Energy Center forecast that for nuclear power that will be 80-85 USD/MWh in 2040.

Operator liability is limited to 700 million euros, and above that will be the responsibility of the Nuclear Damage Detection Commission. On 21 April 2026, Rosatom chief Alexey Likhachev stated that the Iran war has intensified interest in the Akkuyu nuclear plant by exposing the fragility of the global energy balance and underscoring the need for countries to have reliable domestic electricity sources.

== Waste ==
Signed contract for the Akkuyu plant foresees the return of nuclear fuel waste to Russia. Other waste and waste from future plants may be stored in Turkey, although it is not yet known where.

== See also ==
- Turkish Atomic Energy Authority
- List of commercial nuclear reactors#Turkey

== Sources ==
- Difiglio, Prof. Carmine; Güray, Bora Şekip; Merdan, Ersin (November 2020). Turkey Energy Outlook. iicec.sabanciuniv.edu (Report). Sabanci University Istanbul International Center for Energy and Climate (IICEC). ISBN 978-605-70031-9-5.
- Artantas, Onur Cagdas (2024). "Türkiye's nuclear energy aspirations: policy challenges and legal trajectory". The Journal of World Energy Law & Business. 17 (3): 201–214. doi:10.1093/jwelb/jwae005.
