= ANAEM =

Nuclear research and training center in Ankara

Ankara Nuclear Research and Training Center Ankara Nükleer Araştırma ve Eğitim Merkezi
- Abbreviation: ANAEM
- Formation: August 18, 2010; 16 years ago
- Type: GO
- Purpose: Research and training
- Location: Ankara University, Faculty of Science-Beşevler, Ankara, Turkey
- Coordinates: 39.93647°N 32.83075°E
- Parent organization: TAEK
- Website: www.taek.gov.tr/anaem.html

The Ankara Nuclear Research and Training Center (Turkish: Ankara Nükleer Araştırma ve Eğitim Merkezi), known as ANAEM, is a nuclear research and training center of Turkey. The organization was established on August 18, 2010 as a subunit of Turkish Atomic Energy Administration (Turkish: Türkiye Atom Enerjisi Kurumu, TAEK) in its campus at Ankara University's Faculty of Science situated in Beşevler neighborhood in central Ankara. The organization consists of three divisions, which are engaged in education, training and public relations on nuclear matters.

== See also ==
- ÇNAEM Çekmece Nuclear Research and Training Center in Istanbul
- SANAEM Sarayköy Nuclear Research and Training Center in Ankara
