= 2015 Turkey blackout =

Nationwide power outage in Turkey

2015 Turkey power outage
- Native name: 2015 Türkiye Elektrik Kesintisi
- Time: 31 March 2015 10:26:24 EET
- Duration: 8 hours
- Location: 81 provinces in Turkey
- Type: Power outage
- Cause: Power line overload due to line maintenance
- Outcome: Major losses in everyday life, mainly in electricity-dependent jobs
- Deaths: unknown
- Injuries: unknown
- Missing: unknown
- Property damage: unknown
- Publication bans: none

The 2015 Turkey blackout was a widespread power outage that occurred in almost all parts of Turkey in the morning of Tuesday, 31 March 2015.

The Turkish electric authority regularly performs maintenance in the spring in preparation for high electricity demand during the summer. The spring rains also left hydropower plants in Eastern Turkey with a surplus of power, which is then exported to the population centers in Western Turkey. At the time of the blackout, sufficiently many transmission lines and capacitor banks had been removed from service that the system was no longer in an (n-1)-secure state. When the Osmanca – Kurşunlu line tripped, the remaining East-West connections failed. The electric system in Turkey split in half at CET 09:36:11 and separated from the Central European (CE) synchronous zone, i.e. connecting lines to Greece and Bulgaria also tripped. This was the reason that the disturbances only had effects in Turkey and did not cascade to neighbouring countries.

The two parts inside Turkey behaved differently. The Western part suffered from a lack generation (21%) and frequency went down. Load shedding schemes did stabilize the frequency, but as some power plants in Turkey did not cope with running at reduced frequency, additional power was lost and resulted in a blackout of the Western part. The Eastern part suffered from hydropower oversupply (41%) that wasn't able to flow westward. The Eastern part was accelerated by ca. 1.6 Hz/s and culminated at 52.3 Hz. Power plants tripped due to overfrequency and the initially oversupplied Eastern part collapsed at underfrequency values less than 47.0 Hz.

At 16:12 (CET) - ca. 6.5 hours after the blackout - the Western and Eastern part were resynchronised, while the Turkish grid was already about 80% energized. At 18:30 almost 95% of the loads were served again.

== See also ==
- 2003 Italy blackout
- 2006 European blackout
- 2025 Iberian Peninsula blackout
- Conductor gallop
