= Hydroelectricity in Turkey =

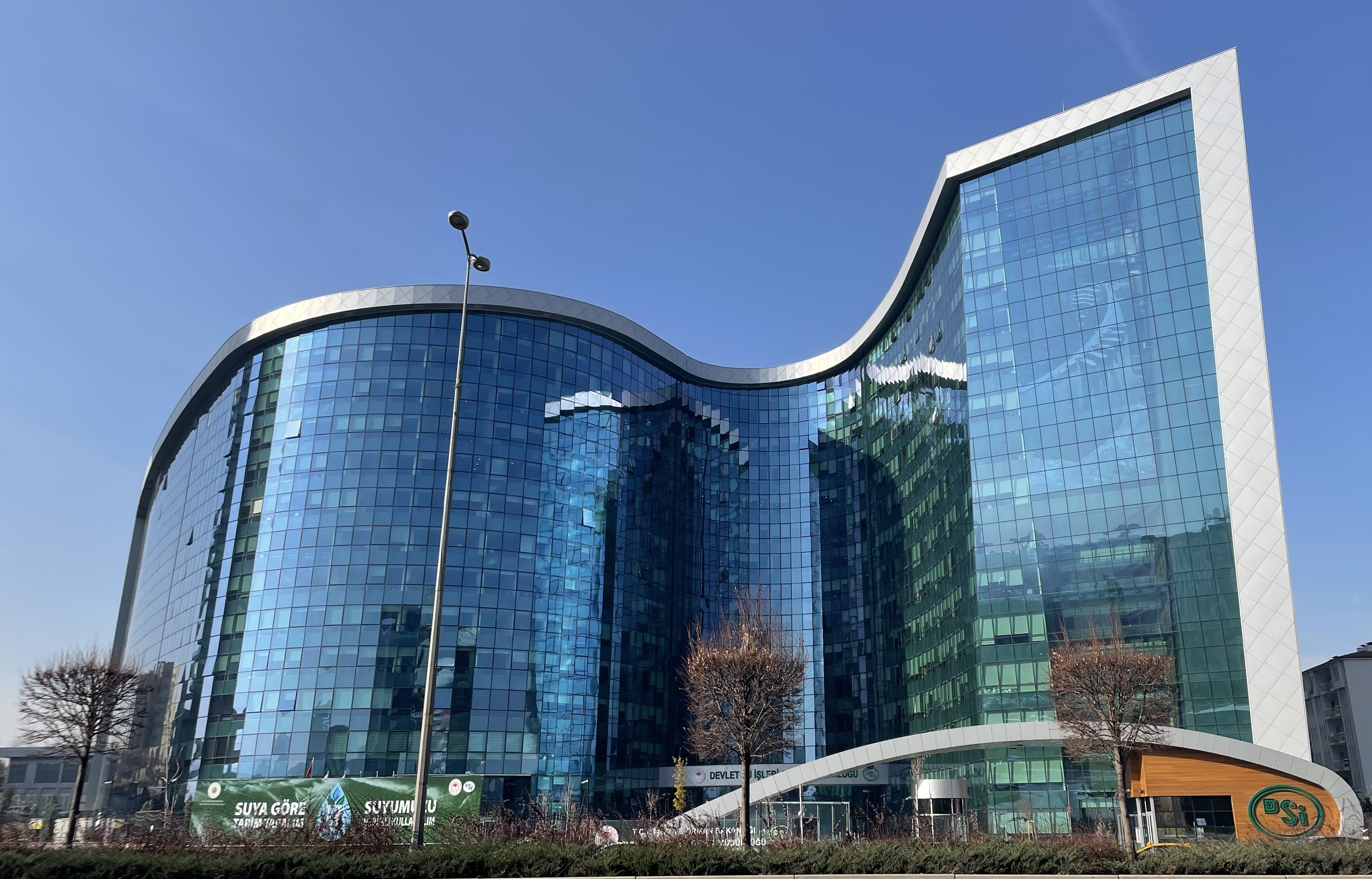
State Hydraulic Works headquarters in Ankara

Hydroelectricity is a major source of electricity in Turkey, due to its mountainous landscape and many rivers. The country's main river basins are the Euphrates and Tigris. Over 700 hydropower plants have been built, and they make up about 30% of the country's electricity generating capacity. Annual generation varies greatly, (Note: For example, drought in 2020 caused a generation drop of over 10% compared to the previous year.) and in rainy years lots of hydroelectric power can be generated. Government policies have generally supported building dams, but some are controversial in neighbouring countries, and some raise concerns about damage to the environment and wildlife.

In 2021, 56 terawatt-hours of hydroelectricity was generated, which was 17% of Turkey's total electrical generation, from 31 GW of capacity. When there is drought in Turkey during the peak demand for electricity in July or August, the aim of the State Hydraulic Works to conserve water for irrigation or drinking can conflict with the Turkish Electricity Transmission Corporation's goal of generating electricity, and water supply is prioritised. Although Turkey's energy strategy may change in the future, due to climate change causing more frequent droughts, hydropower is predicted to remain important for load balancing with solar and wind power. However little new capacity is expected to be built, as the Energy Ministry says hydropower has reached its limit. Converting existing dams to pumped storage has been suggested as more suitable than building new pumped storage.

== Water resources ==
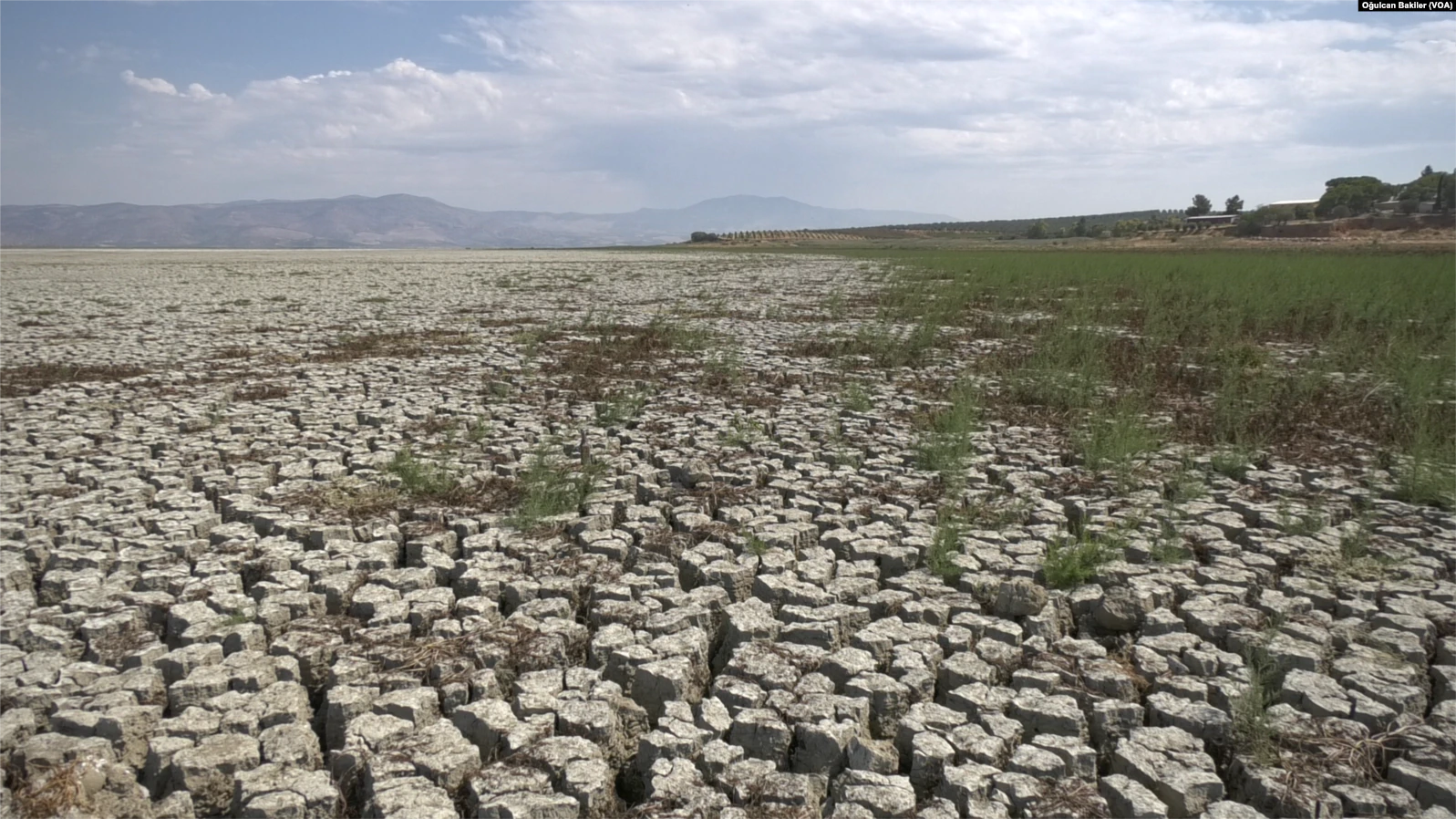
Lake Marmara has completely dried out; perhaps there is not enough rainfall for upstream irrigation dams.

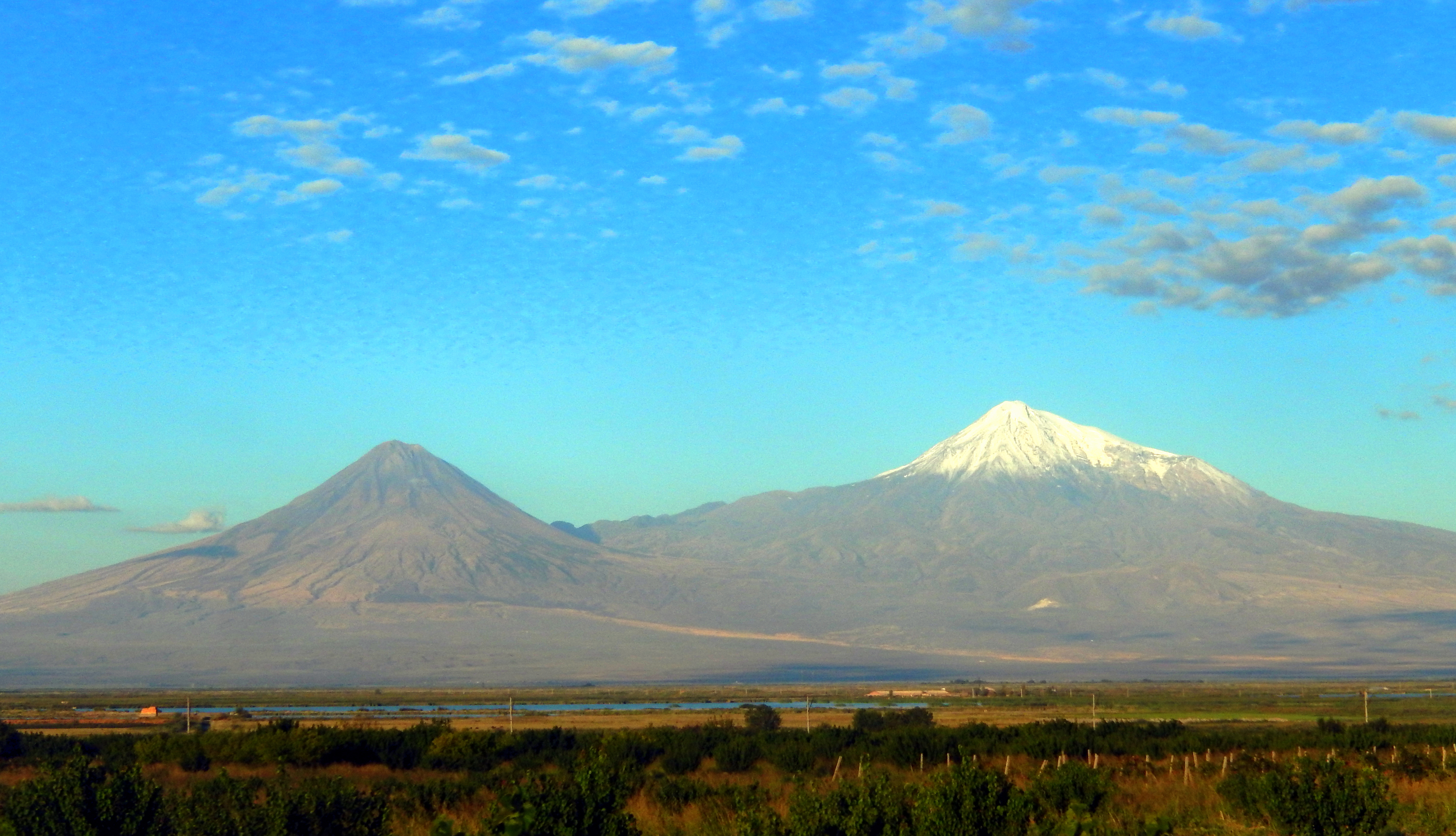
Mount Ararat's glacier is retreating due to climate change, and will be gone before the end of the century.

River basins of Turkey also showing where they extend into neighbouring countries

Climate change has reduced rainfall in some regions and has made it less regular, which has put stress on hydroelectric power plants. Between 1979 and 2019 annual precipitation fluctuated from over 60 cm to under 45 cm, and average annual temperatures varied by 4 degrees. Dams are collecting less drinking water due to reduced pricipitation due to climate change.

Turkey is already a water stressed country, because the amount of water per person is only about 1,500 cubic metres (53,000 cu ft) a year: and due to population increase and climate change it is highly likely the country will suffer water scarcity (less than 1,000 m³) by the 2070s. Higher temperatures can increase evaporation from lakes, making them more saline. Little change has been forecast for water resources in the northern river basins, but a substantial reduction has been forecast for the southern river basins. Konya in central Turkey is also vulnerable. Charging for water used by agriculture has been suggested.

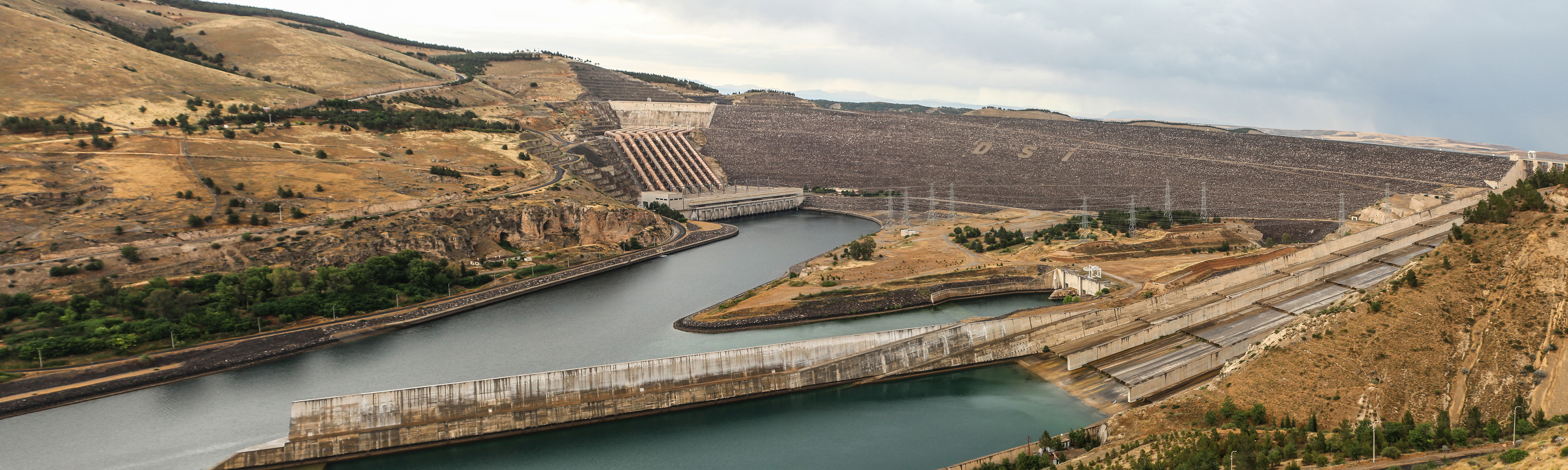
Atatürk Dam, part of the Southeastern Anatolia Project, is the largest in the country.

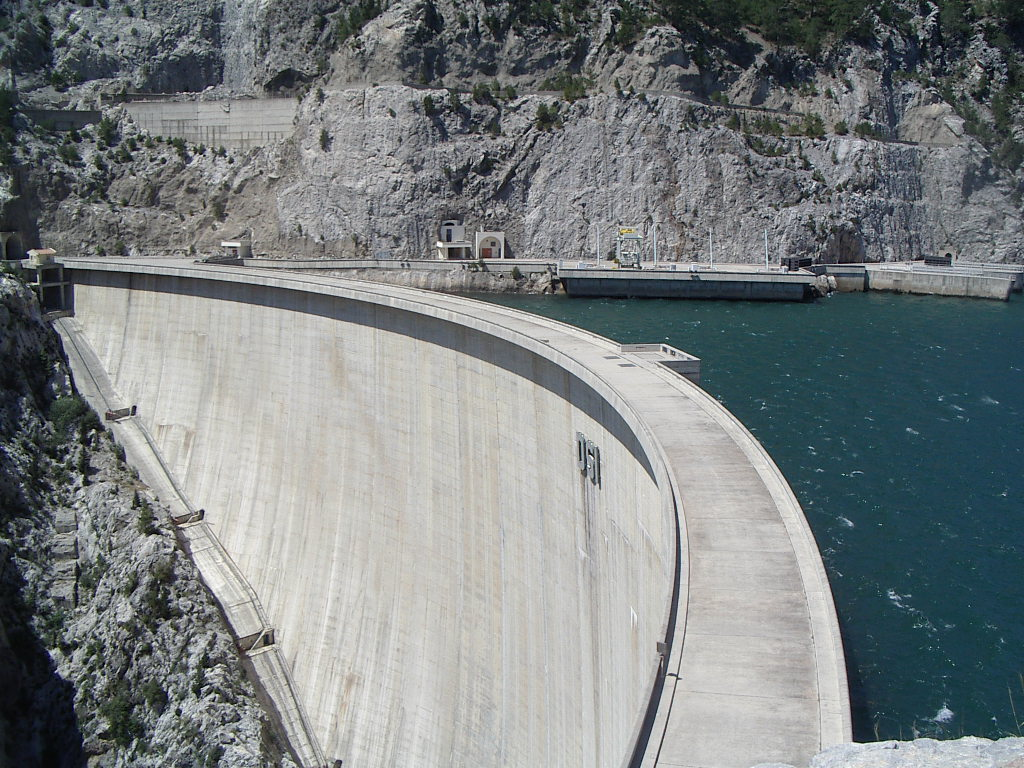
The curved arch of Oymapınar Dam in Antalya is typical for narrow rocky gorges.

Hydro generation (blue) fell from 2019 to 2020 due to drought

=== Hydroelectric potential ===
In 2021, hydropower was the cheapest source of electricity in Turkey, but the IEA expects only a small increase in hydropower by 2026, partly due to the competitive prices of wind and solar. Some academics, such as those at the Shura Energy Transition Center, say that there is limited potential for more hydropower. In 2022, Turkey's energy ministry stated that there is "hydroelectricity potential of 433 billion kWh, while the technically usable potential is 216 billion kWh, and the economic hydroelectricity potential is 160 billion kWh/year." In 2021, in comparison, 56 billion kWh was generated.

Due to climate change in the Tigris and Euphrates river basins, reduced precipitation is forecast, such as happened with the 2020 drought, which caused a generation drop of over 10% compared to the previous year. In 2021, partly due to the drought, generation by non-hydro renewables overtook hydro for the first time. To conserve hydropower, solar power is being added next to existing hydropower, such as at the Lower Kaleköy Dam. Adding hydropower to existing irrigation dams may also be feasible.

=== Energy storage and dispatchability ===
Hydropower usually peaks in April or May. Adding pumps to existing dams, to store wind and solar power as hydropower, has been suggested as more feasible than building new dams with pumps. Although dammed hydro can be dispatched within 3 to 5 minutes, according to analysts at S&P Global, such generation instructions from the Turkish Electricity Transmission Corporation can be countermanded by the State Hydraulic Works, which may have contributed to blackouts in August 2021.

== History ==
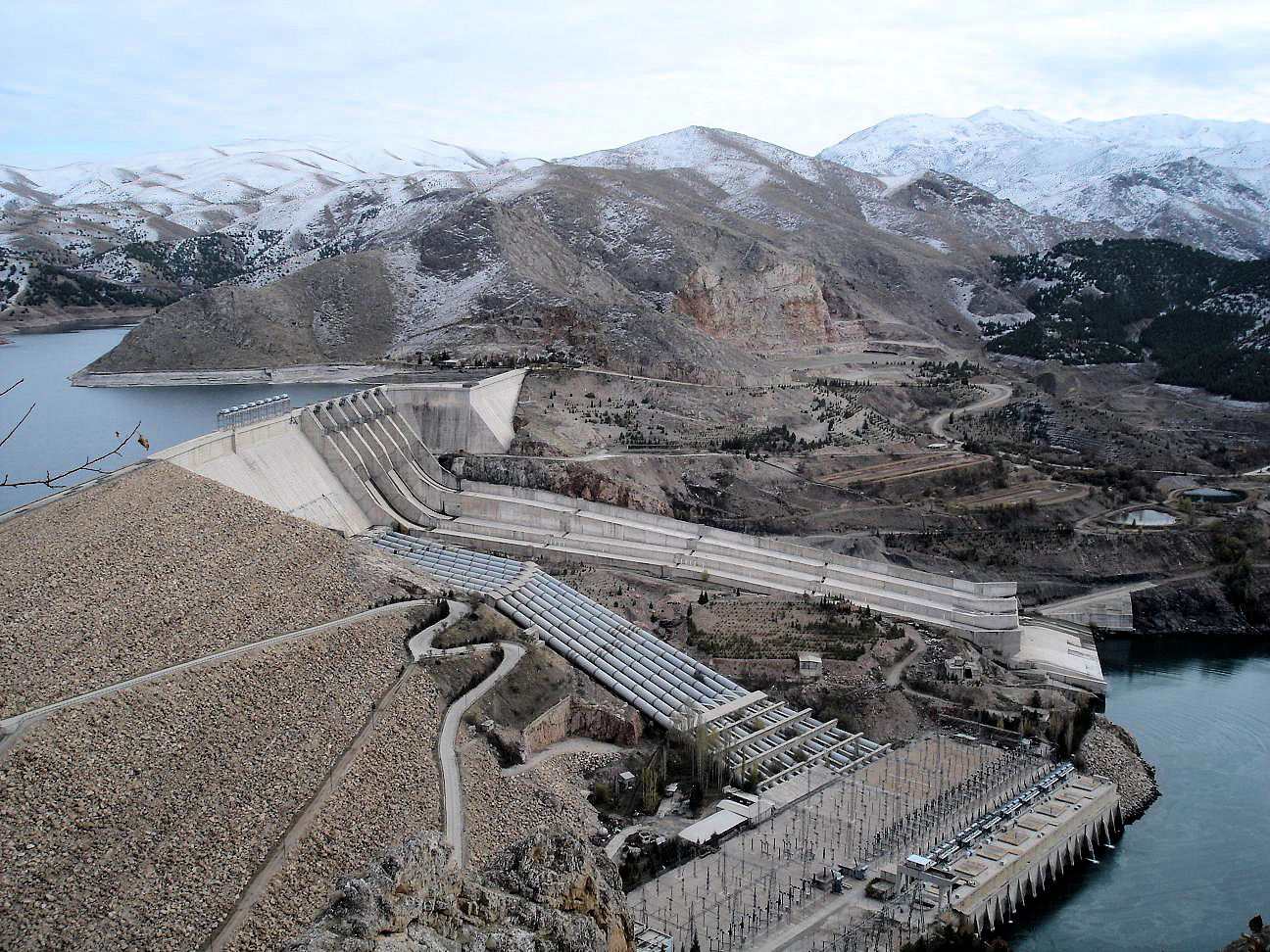
Keban Dam: the first and uppermost of several big dams built on the Euphrates.

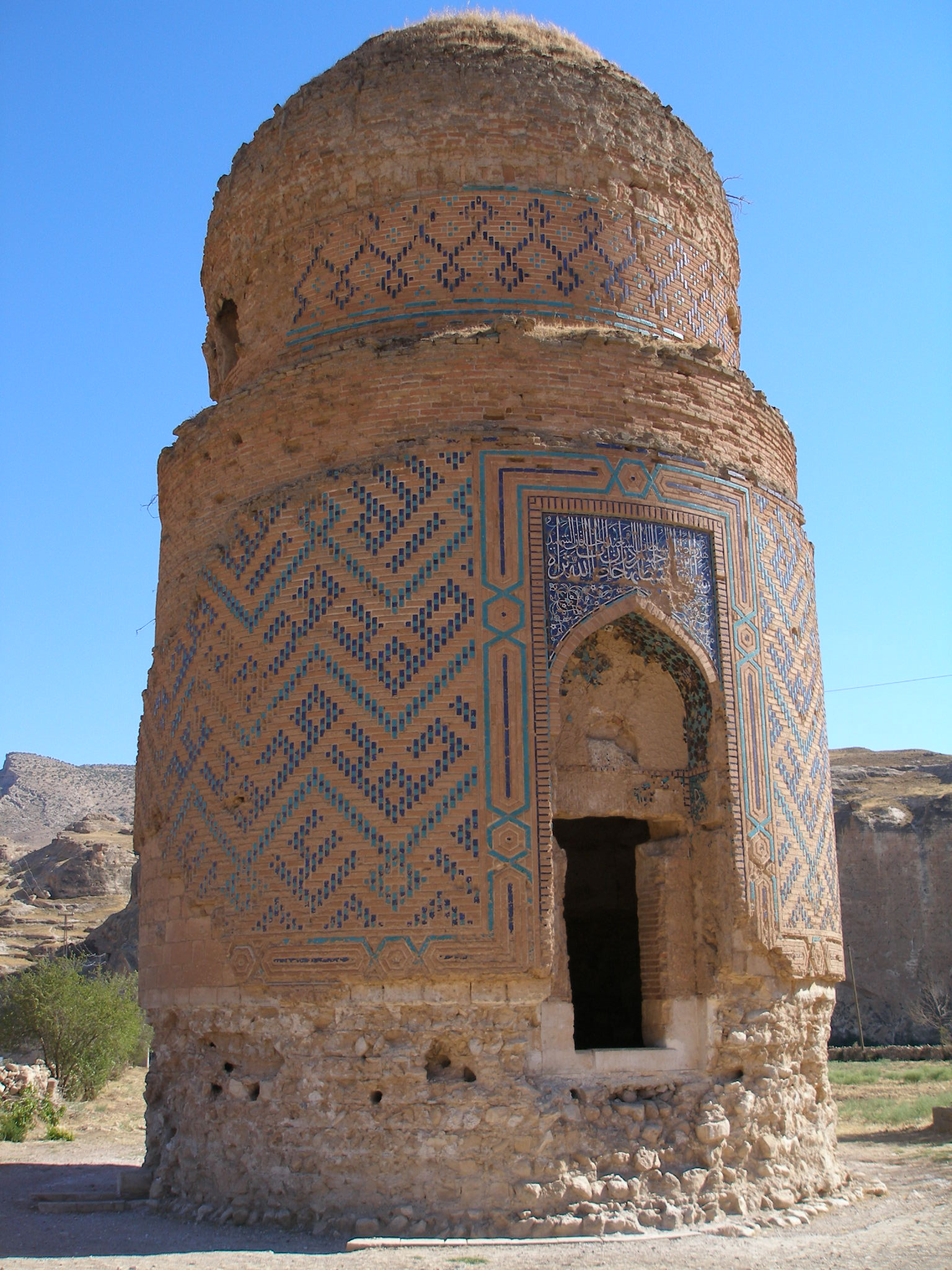
Mausoleum of Zeynel Bey at Hasankeyf, before it was moved to higher ground to avoid being submerged by the controversial Ilısu Dam in the early 2020s.

The first power plant of any kind in Turkey was a 60 kW hydro plant constructed in Tarsus, which started operation on 15 September 1902. Feasibility studies for more dams were done in the 1920s and 1930s. After the State Hydraulic Works (DSI) was established in 1954, major projects (such as the first large dams, the Seyhan Dam and the Sarıyar Dam) had better funding, and significant quantities of hydroelectricity were generated for the first time. Turkey built dams to meet its growing energy demand from rapid urbanization, industrialization, and population growth. Between 1970 and 2019, generation increased by almost 10% per year, and 2.5 GW was added during 2020. In 2021, generation from other renewables exceeded hydro for the first time.

Following the 1973 oil crisis, the government began the Southeastern Anatolia Project, both for energy security and to help the poorer southeastern part of Anatolia catch up with the growing economy. Amongst other developments, such as irrigation projects, several hydropower plants were built. By 1988, hydropower comprised over 60% of total electrical generation. Before that, coal had been the only other substantial source. Around the same time, natural gas also began to play an important role. The Southeastern Anatolia project cost 190.8 billion lira (US$ 34 billion, at 2020 prices). According to the Istanbul Chamber of Commerce, by 2021 this cost was recovered in the value of the electricity alone. Almost 25% of the country's hydroelectricity is now produced by the project.

However, some Kurds have called the project "mass cultural destruction". Most of the project has been completed, but at least one dam (Silvan Dam) and hydroelectric power plant are still under construction. The project is controversial with the downstream countries of Iraq and Syria. According to Dr. Arda Bilgen, the reduced flow of the Euphrates was one reason Syria supported PKK attacks on Turkey in the 1980s. Since the Syrian Civil War started in 2011, international water cooperation has been very difficult.

Since the beginning of the 21st century, private companies have been able to get long leases on rivers, and DSI has mainly coordinated and supervised, rather than constructing its own power plants. Particularly in the north-east of Turkey, small-scale projects were developed. Contrary to expectations, these did not bring about more consensus and local acceptance than large dams.

== Projects ==
The geography of Turkey includes 25 river basins, and generally those with the most potential for hydropower are the least populated. The private sector has generally invested in run-of-river hydroelectricity, and the public sector in dammed hydro. Private-sector water-use agreements are usually for 49 years, with minimum discharge flow of 10% of the previous ten-year average. As of 2022 there are 730 hydropower plants making up 31 GW of the country's 100 GW generating capacity. The state electricity company owns 14 GW, while the only private companies with over 1 GW are Cengiz, EnerjiSA, and Limak. In spring, water flow is greatest, but electricity demand is low and its price may consequently also be low. Another 4 GW is planned for after 2023.

The province with the most hydroelectricity capacity is Şanliurfa, with over 3 GW, followed by Elazığ and Diyarbakır, each with over 2 GW. The highest dam is Yusufeli.

=== Largest power stations ===
The three longest rivers in Turkey also have the highest capacity hydropower plants, the largest being Atatürk Dam on the Euphrates. On the same river are the second and third largest. Ilısu on the Tigris is the newest large dam. In contrast, the Kızılırmak River, which flows north into the Black Sea, has smaller projects. Its hydro plants are less than 1 GW, the largest being Altınkaya.

== Impacts on people and the environment ==
The dams and their hydroelectric power plants have had positive and negative impacts on the environment. One of the most useful features of hydroelectric power plants is that generation can be quickly ramped up and down, to meet demand and balance wind and solar. Compared to fossil-fuel power plants, the country's hydroelectricity emits much less greenhouse gas. Being a local source, it improves the balance of payments, since Turkey imports around three-quarters of its energy.

As well as environmental impact assessment reports before construction, there are also water-usage studies and ecological evaluation; but according to a 2021 study by Melis Terzi, stipulations in the reports are sometimes ignored during construction. The study also says that the legal requirement to provide fish passages has often been ignored. Large hydropower plants may be bad for sturgeon, as in neighbouring Georgia. In 2021, the Turkish company contracted to build the Namakhvani hydropower plant in Georgia pulled out after protests. According to the Bianet newspaper, sometimes small rivers have completely dried out in summer due to hydropower requirements. Fish, such as the kisslip himri, may be threatened with extinction; but this is unclear, as there have been no studies since 2014. Sediment management is sometimes not up to the EU Water Framework Directive standard. Turkey has not yet adopted the sustainability certification devised by the International Hydropower Association in 2021.

In some areas locals are concerned that dams result in a decrease in nature tourism. Like national energy policy as a whole, decision-making for dam construction is centralized and not always transparent, which can lead to complaints by local people. Tens of thousands of people have been displaced by reservoirs. Archaeologists, such as Nevin Soyukaya, say that there has been disregard for the damage to ancient settlements, such as at Hasankeyf.

Dams on international rivers, such as the controversial Ilısu Dam on the Tigris completed in 2021, can cause water shortages in downstream countries; to wit, Iraq and Syria. Although international protests stopped foreign funding of the dam, Iraqi protests could not prevent it being built with domestic funding. There are also 14 Turkish dams on the Euphrates. The Tigris and Euphrates are the main source of water for much of Iraq, and Iraqi academics say that Turkish dams on those rivers are damaging the environment of Iraq. Although a 1987 Euphrates water-sharing agreement assured that at least 500 cubic metres per second would leave Turkey, for Syria and Iraq, this assumed that the water flow would not be reduced. However, natural flow has been reduced due to climate change in Turkey, leading to real flow being less than Iraq's allocations in the agreement. Hydropower projects on the transboundary rivers Kura and Aras have been criticised by local environmental activists and have also caused tensions between Turkey and downstream Caucasian countries, such as Azerbaijan.

== Economics ==
As of February 2022, the feed-in tariff (FiT – excluding domestic components incentive) was 400 Turkish lira (TL)/MWh (about US$29), more than solar and wind but less than geothermal. However, in late 2021 the government and private-sector energy analysts had already predicted that the day-ahead price on the electricity market throughout 2022 would be higher than the FiT for the first year, thus resulting in a negative contract for difference. By late March 2022, the spot price of electricity had reached the ceiling (thrice the average price over the past 12 months) of 1745 TL (more than US$115), and the energy ministry was reported to be considering different ceiling prices for different sources of electricity. It is not yet known what the ceiling price of hydroelectricity will be, or even if such a scheme will actually be legislated. Because transmission congestion of run-of-river can cause price imbalances, zonal pricing has been proposed. As of November 2022 10 hydropower stations are eligible for capacity mechanism payments.

== Politics ==
Many dams were built by Republican People's Party governments in the 20th century. However, the party's current stance on hydropower is unclear. Its 2018 general election manifesto did not mention it, and the party has opposed many recent dam projects, mostly due to environmental concerns. The Justice and Development Party, which has been in power nationwide since 2002 (in coalition with the Nationalist Movement Party since 2016), has also built many dams and encouraged private companies to build run-of-river hydro. According to its party platform, the Good Party "supports the utilization of local and renewable resources to their fullest extent", which includes hydropower. The Peoples' Democratic Party, in contrast, is more opposed to hydroelectric plants due to their impact on communities and environments. Arda Bilgen, a Turkish academic, says that since the 1960s the central government (inspired primarily by the United States Bureau of Reclamation) has used dam building to strengthen the central government's hold over Eastern and Southeastern Anatolia, to help grow these regions' economies, using a top-down approach.

Turkey was one of three countries that voted against the 1997 UN Watercourses Convention, which is the main international freshwater law. According to Nareg Kuyumjian at the Environmental Law Institute, this was because Turkey benefited from "hydroanarchy".
