= Betül Kırdar =

Turkish molecular and systems biologist

Betül Kırdar is a Turkish molecular and systems biologist researching design strategies of microorganisms, metabolic engineering, and biological networks. She is a professor in the department of chemical engineering at Boğaziçi University.

== Education ==
Betül Kırdar completed a B.S. (1970) and MS (1972) in chemical engineering at Istanbul University. From 1972 to 1973, she was a research fellow at the ÇNAEM. Kırdar earned a Ph.D. in biochemistry at the University of Paris-VII, French National Centre for Scientific Research (Centre Genetique Moleculaire) in 1977.

== Career and research ==
In 1978, she joined the faculty at Boğaziçi University as an assistant professor in the department of biology. She became associate professor in 1982 and full professor in 1988. She served as vice-dean of the faculty of engineering from 2001 to 2003.

Kırdar uses a systems biology approach to investigate design strategies of microorganisms, metabolic engineering, and biological networks.
