= Electricity in Turkey =

Electricity generation, transmission and consumption in Turkey

Electricity sector of Turkey
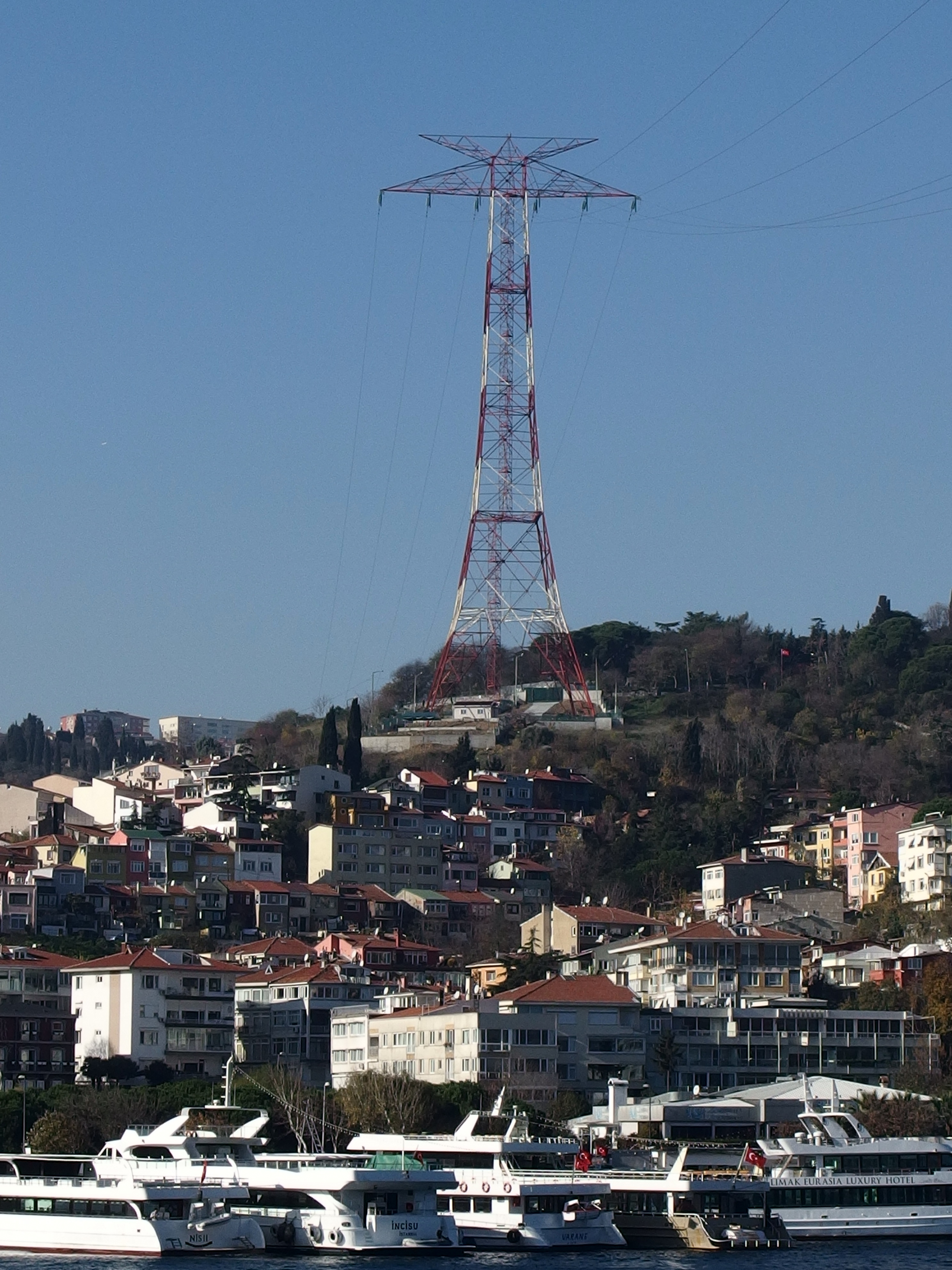
- One of the Bosphoros crossings at Istanbul: 154 kV

Data
- Installed capacity (2022): 100 GW
- Production (2021): 329 TWh
- Share of fossil energy: 65% generation, 47% capacity
- Share of renewable energy: 35% generation, 53% capacity
- GHG emissions from electricity generation (2020): 131 Mt CO_{2}e (power stations including heat sold by power stations)
- Average electricity use (2021): 327 TWh
- Distribution losses (2020): 9.5%

Consumption by sector (% of total)
- Residential: 21% (2018)
- Industrial: 117 TWh (2019)
- Agriculture: 7 TWh (2019)
- Commercial and public sector: 28% (2018)
- Traction: 1 TWh (2019)

Services
- Sector unbundling: Partial
- Share of private sector in transmission: 0
- Share of private sector in distribution: See text
- Competitive supply to large users: Yes
- Competitive supply to residential users: Only to those consuming over 1400 kWh per year

Institutions
- No. of service providers: EÜAŞ, private companies
- Responsibility for transmission: Turkish Electricity Transmission Corporation
- Responsibility for regulation: Energy Market Regulatory Authority
- Responsibility for policy-setting: Ministry of Energy and Natural Resources

Turkey uses more electricity per person than the global average, but less than the European average, with demand peaking in summer due to air conditioning. Most electricity is generated from coal, gas and hydropower, with hydroelectricity from the east transmitted to big cities in the west. Electricity prices are state-controlled, but wholesale prices are heavily influenced by the cost of imported gas.

Each year, over 300 terawatt-hours (TWh) of electricity is used, which is almost a quarter of the total energy used in Turkey. On average, about four hundred grams of carbon dioxide is emitted per kilowatt-hour of electricity generated (400 gCO_{2}/kWh); this carbon intensity is slightly less than the global average. As there is 100 GW of generating capacity, far more electricity could be produced. Although only a tiny proportion is exported; consumption is forecast to increase, and there are plans for more exports during the 2020s.

Turkey's coal-fired power stations are the largest source of the country's greenhouse-gas emissions. Many brown coal power stations are subsidized, which increases air pollution. Imports of gas, mostly for Turkey's power stations, are one of the main expenses for the country. In winter, electricity generation is vulnerable to reductions in the gas supply from other countries. Solar and wind power are now the cheapest generators of electricity, and more of both are being built. If enough solar and wind power is built, the country's hydroelectric plants should be enough to cover windless cloudy weeks.

Renewables generate a third of the country's electricity, and academics have suggested that the target of 32% renewable energy by 2030 be increased to 50%, and that coal power should be phased out by the mid-2030s. Increased use of electric vehicles is expected to increase electricity demand. Modernizing the grid is important for the country’s energy security. 36% electrification is targeted for 2040.

== Consumption ==
Each year, over 300 TWh of electricity is used in Turkey: this supplies almost a quarter of the total final energy demand, the rest being from coal, oil and gas. Due to air conditioning demand peaks in summer: with August highest (32 TWh in 2021) and February typically lowest (24 TWh in 2021). Total national consumption divided by the population is under 4,000 kWh a year, much below the average of around 10,000 kWh a year for other OECD countries in Europe, but half as much again as the global average. Shares of energy usage in 2019 totaled 45% for industry, 29% for services and 21% for households. Consumption is forecast to increase.

As of 2021, household electricity consumption is estimated to average 230 kWh a month and is dominated by refrigerators, followed by televisions then washing machines. Space heating and electric vehicles have the biggest potential for demand side response.

Between 2019 and 2024, Turkey plans to invest US$11 billion into energy efficiency; and by 2035 replace 80% of electricity meters with smart meters. Electricity's share of energy consumption is expected to increase, from 22% in 2019 to perhaps 28% in 2040, partly due to electrification of road transport.

=== Demand forecasts ===
Demand forecasting is important, because constructing too much electricity generation capacity can be expensive, both for government energy subsidies and private sector debt interest. Conversely, constructing too little risks delaying the health benefits of electrification, the biggest of which is cleaner air due to fossil fuel phase-out.

Distribution companies, some retail companies, and industrial zones send their demand forecasts to the Energy Ministry and the Turkish Electricity Transmission Corporation (TEIAŞ) every year. TEİAŞ then publishes low, base and high 10 year forecasts, using the "DECADES" model; whereas the Energy Ministry uses the "Model for Analysis of Energy Demand".

Year forecast made	Forecast year	Forecast amount (TWh)	Actual amount	Forecaster
2018	2019	317	304	government
2018	2021	322 to 345	329	academics
2022	2025	380		government
2020	2030	359, 396, 454		TEİAŞ

Some official demand forecasts are overestimated, which could be due to low economic growth. In 2019 actual generation was 76% of firm capacity, and overcapacity continued into the early 2020s. In 2022 and 2023 demand decreased, partly due to industry's share of the economy decreasing. However Ember says the 14% increase from 2019 to 2024 was due to more heavy industry and manufacturing and infrastructure spending.

=== Industry ===
The share of electricity used in industry is expected to increase at the expense of the fossil fuel share as Turkey moves to more technology manufacturing. Less coal is being burnt for industry and oil burning remains static. One projection even shows electricity overtaking gas to become the largest industrial energy source at 30%, however more efficient lighting and industrial motors, together with policy changes supporting efficiency, could limit demand growth.

=== Electrification of transport ===
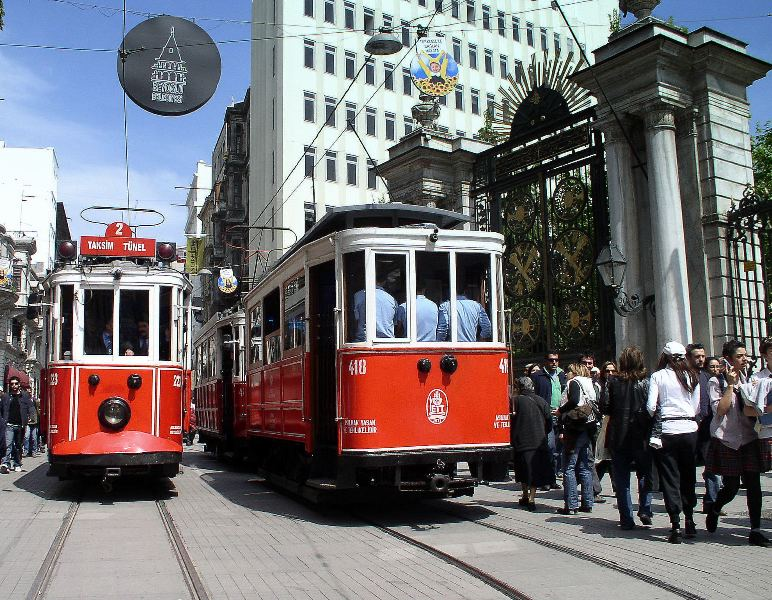
Nostalgic tramway in Istanbul - transport is expected to once again become a major consumer with vehicles such as cars made by Togg, electric buses and trains.

In 2021, less than 3000 fully electric cars were sold, however production and use of some types of electric vehicles, such as cars manufactured by Togg, may increase demand during the 2020s. Shura Energy Transition Center, a think tank, has recommended to automatically charge electric cars when plenty of wind and solar power is available. The architecture of Turkey means that many city dwellers live in apartment blocks without off-street parking: regulations require at least one charger per 50 new parking spaces in shopping malls and public parking lots. Getting old diesel cars and trucks off the road would have health and environmental benefits, but this would require new pollution control legislation, and as of 2021 the only commercial electric vehicles planned for mass production are vans. The government aims to end sales of fossil fuel cars and lorries by 2040. Ford hopes to build a factory to make batteries for commercial electric vehicles.

== Generation ==
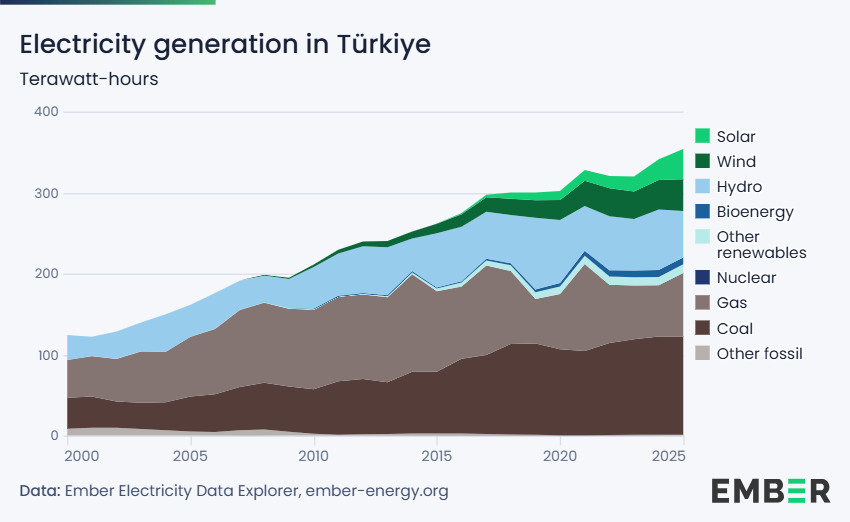
Electricity generation in Turkey by source in terawatt-hours

Of the total 329 TWh of electricity generated in 2021; natural gas produced 42%, coal 26%, hydropower 13%, and wind 10%. Installed capacity reached 100 GW in 2022. Academics have suggested that the target of 32% from renewables by 2030 should be increased to at least 50%. The state-owned Electricity Generation Company (EÜAŞ) has about 20% of the market, and there are many private companies. The carbon intensity of generation during the 2010s was slightly over 400 gCO_{2}/kWh, around the global average.

=== Coal ===
Coal in Turkey generated a third of the nation's electricity in 2023. There are 55 active coal-fired power stations with a total capacity of 21 gigawatts (GW). (Note: EMRA totals 15 + 22 + 15 = 52 coal power licences - but as ZETES 1 2 and 3 have the same licence if counted as separate power stations the total would be 54, which almost matches the total on the Turkish version of the Wikipedia list.) In 2023 coal imports for electricity generation cost US$3.7 billion.

Air pollution from coal-fired power stations is damaging public health, and it is estimated that a coal phase-out by 2030 instead of by the 2050s would save over 100,000 lives. Flue gas emission limits were improved in 2020, but data from mandatory reporting of emission levels is not made public. Turkey has not ratified the Gothenburg Protocol, which limits fine dust polluting other countries. As of 2023 official health impact assessment is not done in Turkey.

Turkey's coal is almost all low calorie lignite, but government policy supports its continued use. In contrast, Germany is closing lignite-fired stations under 150 MW. Drought in Turkey is frequent, but thermal power stations use significant amounts of water.

Coal-fired power stations are the largest source of greenhouse gas, at about a tonne each year per person, which is about the world average. Coal-fired stations emit over 1 kg of carbon dioxide for every kilowatt hour generated, over twice that of gas power. Academics suggest that in order to reach Turkey's target of carbon neutrality by 2053, coal power should be phased out by the mid-2030s. In January 2023 the National Energy Plan was published: it forecast a capacity increase to 24.3 GW by 2035, including 1.7 GW more by 2030. However, by 2024 it was obvious that no new coal power stations would be built, although Çelikler Holding still want to add units to Afşin Elbistan A, and Tufanbeyli management want to expand it, which are the only proposals for new unabated coal power in the OECD. The national plan forecasts coal generation decreasing but capacity payments continuing for flexible and baseload power, with coal power subsidies in the 4 years to 2030 estimated at $8.7 billion. Turkey is Europes top coal polluter outside Russia.

=== Gas ===
In 2020, power plants consumed 29% of natural gas in Turkey. State-owned gas-fired power plants are less efficient than private plants, but can out-compete them, as the state guarantees a price for their electricity. Gas power plants are used more when drought reduces hydropower, such as in 2021 which was a record year for gas consumption. The National Energy Plan published in 2023 forecasted 10 GW more gas power plants would be built. However in the 3 years to 2025 gas power fell, perhaps due to the increase in solar and cheap coal from Russia.

=== Hydropower ===
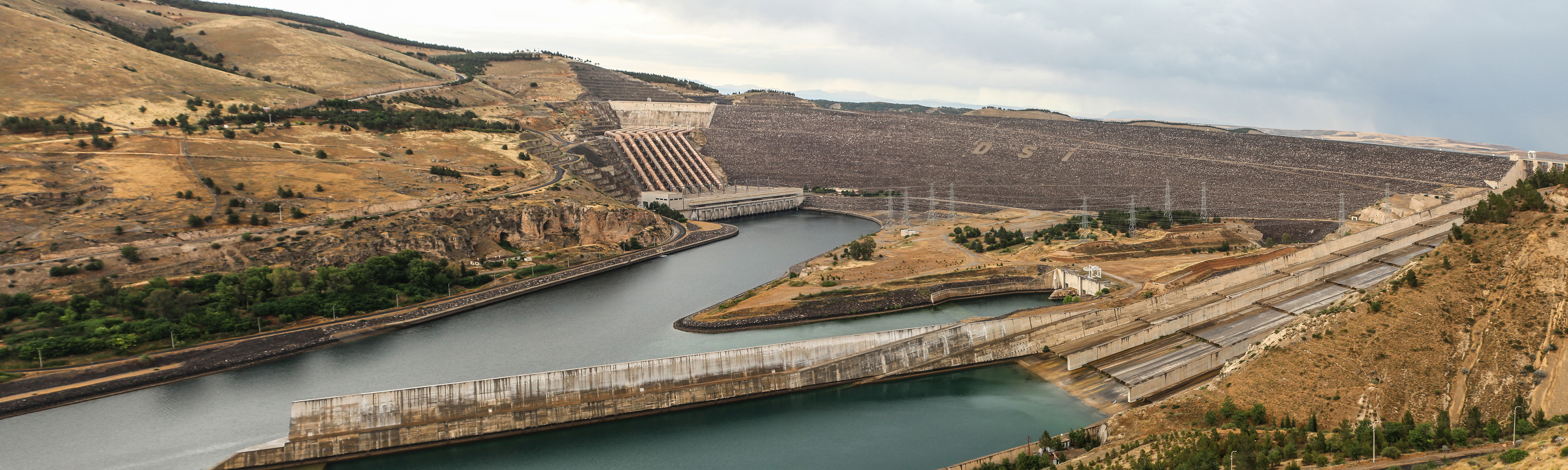
Atatürk Dam in Turkey is the third largest dam in the world.

Hydropower is a critical source of electricity, and in some years substantial amounts can be generated due to Turkey's mountainous landscape, abundance of rivers, and it being surrounded by three seas. The main river basins are the Euphrates and the Tigris. Many dams have been built throughout the country, and a peak of 28 GW of power can be generated by hydroelectric plants. Almost 90 TWh was generated in 2019, around 30% of the country's electricity. There are many policies that support hydroelectricity. Construction of some dams has been controversial for various reasons: for example environmentalists claiming they damage wildlife such as fish, or downstream countries complaining of reduced water flow.

Due to changes in rainfall, generation varies considerably from year to year. (Note: For example, drought in 2020 caused a generation drop of over 10% compared to the previous year.) And, according to S&P Global Platts, when there is drought in Turkey during the peak electricity demand month of August the aim of the State Hydraulic Works to conserve water for irrigation can conflict with the Turkish Electricity Transmission Corporation aiming to generate electricity. Despite droughts increasing due to climate change, hydropower is predicted to remain important for load balancing. Converting existing dams to pumped storage has been suggested as more feasible than new pumped storage.

=== Wind ===
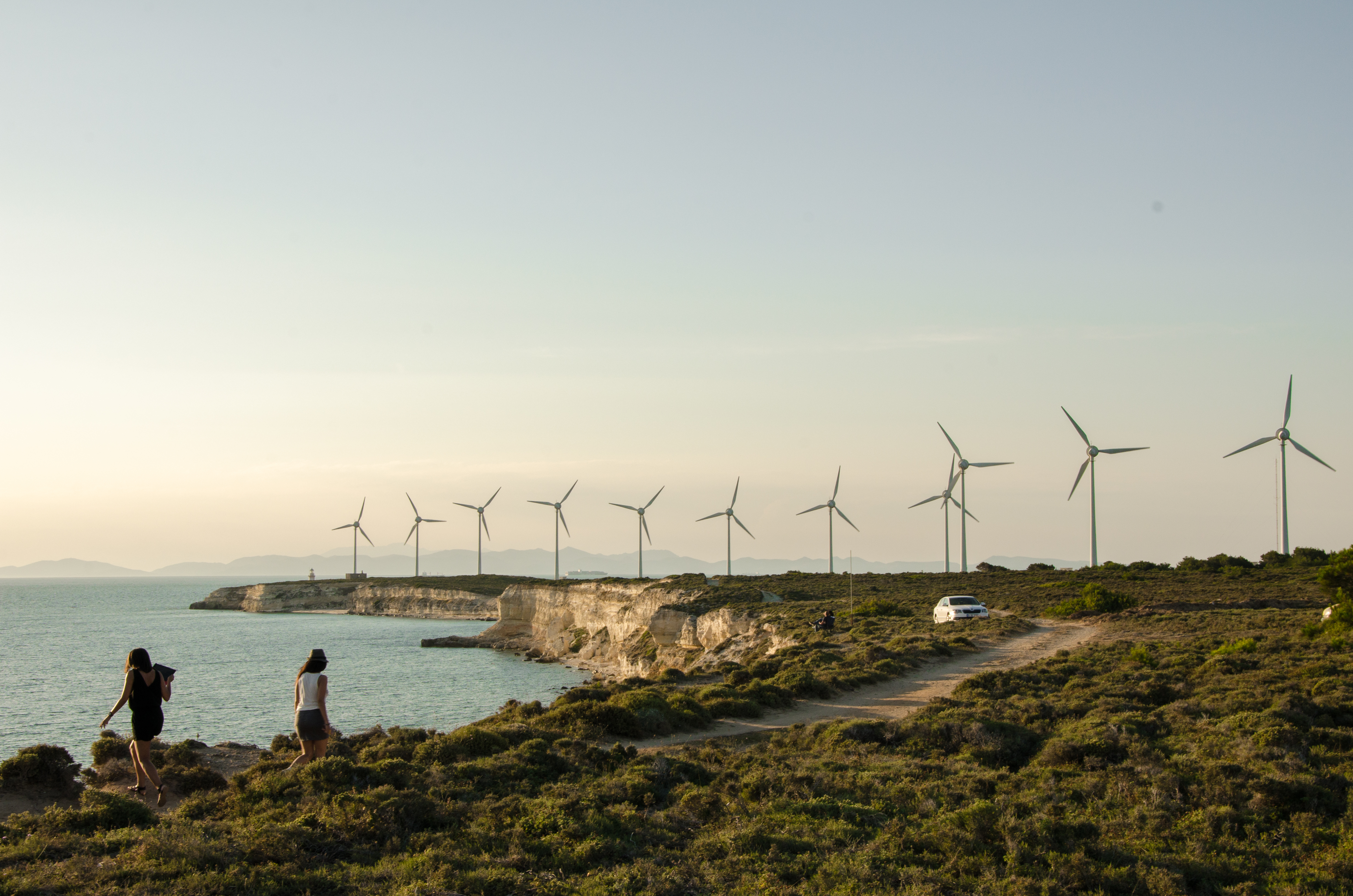
Wind turbines on the island of Bozcaada in the far west

Wind power installed capacity and generation in Turkey

Wind power generates about 10% of Turkey's electricity, mainly in the west in the Aegean and Marmara regions, and is gradually becoming a larger share of renewable energy in the country. As of 2025, Turkey has over 13 gigawatts (GW) of wind turbines. The Energy Ministry plans to have almost 30 GW by 2035, including 5 GW offshore.

In 2021, the state-owned Electricity Generation Company (EÜAŞ) had about 20% of the market, and there were many private companies. The highest ever daily share of wind power was 25%, in 2022.

Building new wind farms is cheaper than running existing coal plants which depend on imported coal. According to modelling by Carbon Tracker in 2020, new wind will be cheaper than all existing coal plants by 2027.

=== Solar ===
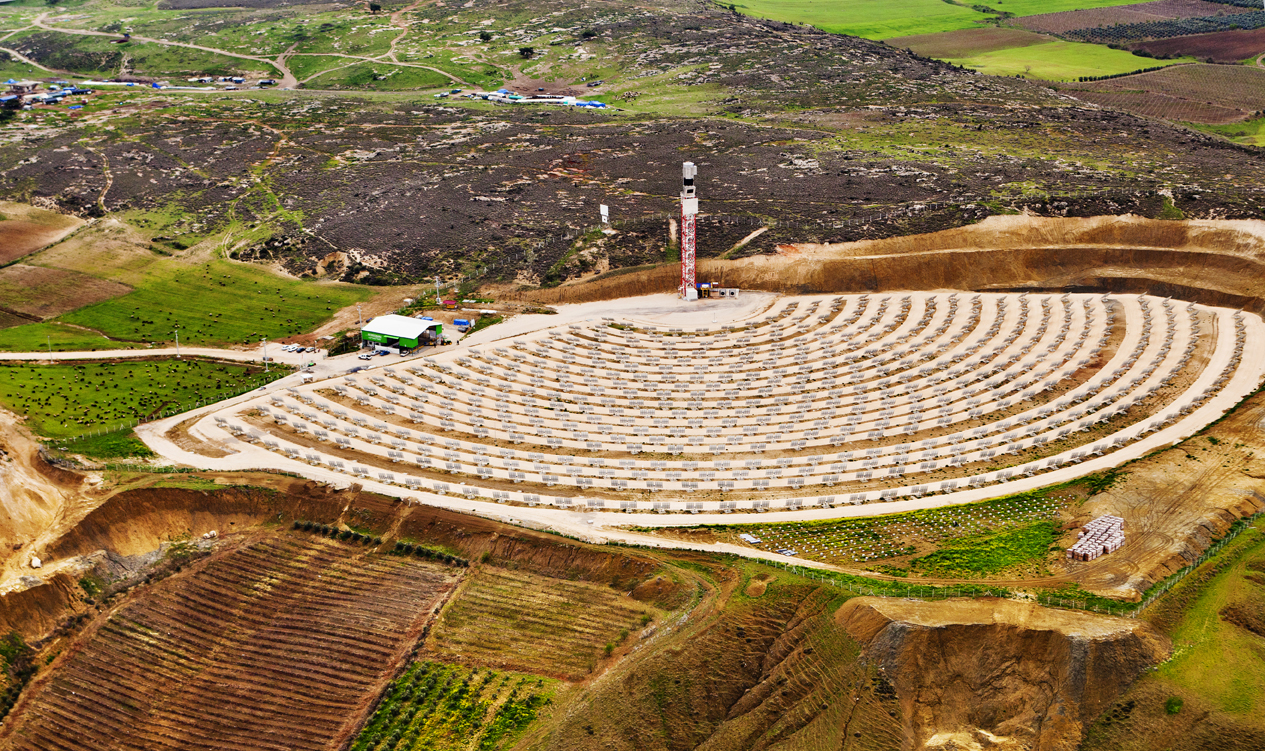
Greenway Solar power tower in Mersin is the only generator using concentrated solar, the rest are photovoltaic.

Turkey is located in an advantageous position in the Middle East and Southeast Europe for solar energy, and it is a growing part of renewable energy in the country, with almost 8 GW generating about 4% of the country's electricity. Solar potential is high in Turkey, especially in the south-east and Mediterranean provinces. Conditions for solar power generation are comparable to Spain. In 2020 Turkey ranked 8th in Europe for solar power, but it could increase far more quickly if subsidies for coal were abolished and the auction system was improved. Every gigawatt of solar power installed would save over US$100 million in gas import costs.

Peak daily generation in 2020 was over 1 TWh in September. According to modelling by Carbon Tracker, new solar power became cheaper than new coal power in 2020, and will become cheaper than existing coal plants in 2023. According to think tank Ember, building new solar and wind power in Turkey is cheaper than running existing coal plants which depend on imported coal. But they say that there are obstacles to building utility-scale solar, such as: lack of new capacity for solar power at transformers, a 50 MW cap on any single solar power plant's installed capacity, and large consumers being unable to sign long term power purchase agreements for new solar installations. Unlicensed power plants, which are mostly solar, generated about 4% of electricity in 2021.

=== Geothermal ===
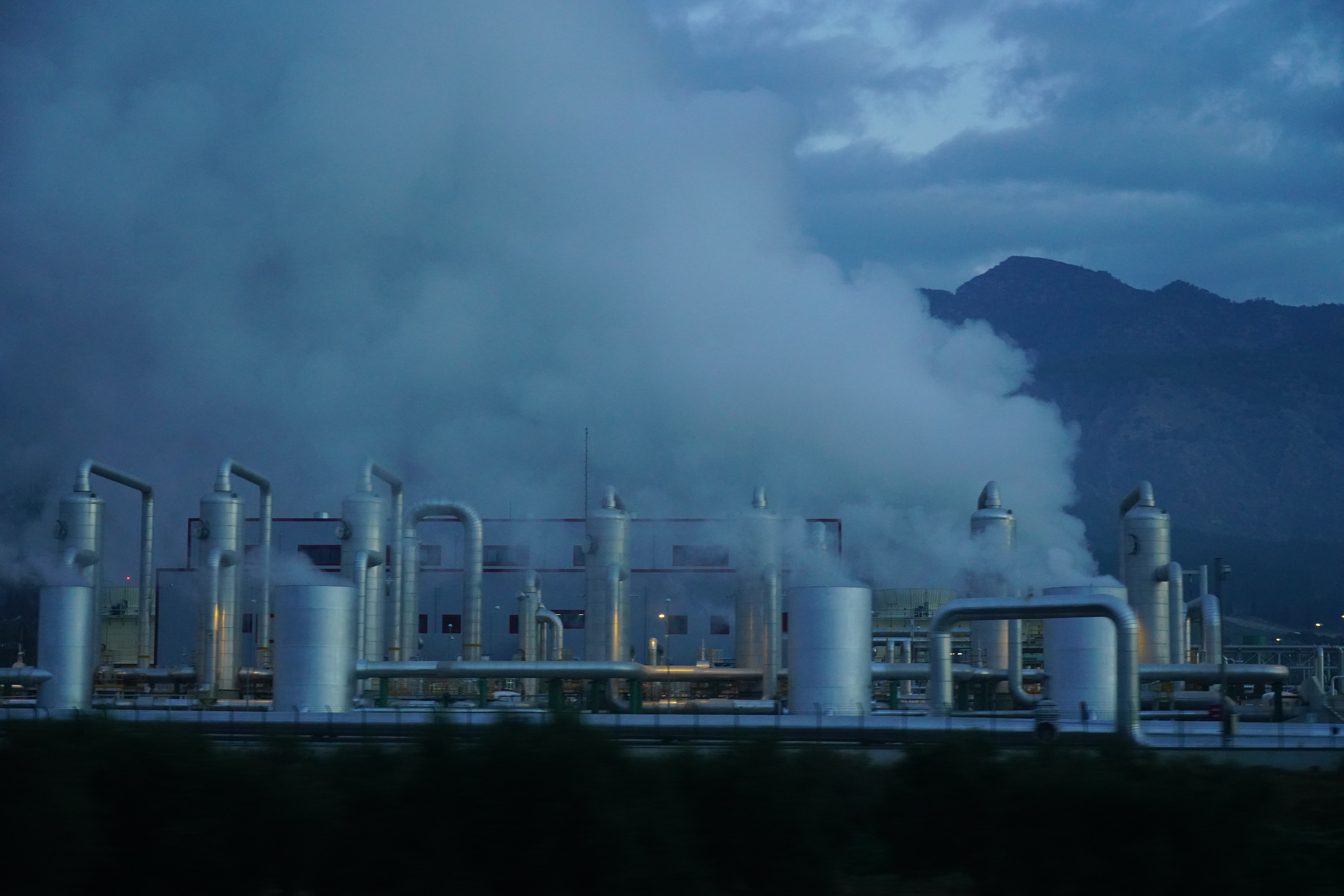
Kızıldere Geothermal Power Plant in western Turkey

There are almost 2 gigawatts of electrical geothermal power in Turkey, which is a significant part of renewable energy in Turkey. Geothermal power in Turkey began in the 1970s, in a prototype plant, following systematic exploration of geothermal fields. In the 1980s the pilot facility became the first geothermal power plant. The small-sized geothermal power plant was expanded to the country's biggest in 2013. Over 60 power plants operate in Turkey as of 2020, with potential for more. As well as contributing to electricity generation, geothermal energy is also used in direct heating applications. At the end of 2021 Turkey had 1.7 GW installed capacity, the fourth largest in the world after the United States, Indonesia and the Philippines.

There is almost 2 GW of geothermal and sites for much more including enhanced geothermal systems. However carbon dioxide emissions can be high, especially for new plants, so to prevent carbon dioxide dissolved out of the rocks being released into the atmosphere the fluid is sometimes completely reinjected after its heat is used.

=== Nuclear ===
Nuclear power stations in Turkey (view)
Under construction
Proposed

Turkey's first nuclear power plant, at Akkuyu, is planned to start generation in 2023, and is expected to last for at least 60 years. The nuclear power debate has a long history, with the 2018 construction start in Mersin Province being the sixth major attempt to build a nuclear power plant since 1960. Nuclear power has been criticised, as being very expensive to taxpayers.

Plans for a nuclear power plant at Sinop and another at İğneada have stalled.

=== Hybrid, distributed and virtual generation ===
Hybrid generation became more popular in the early 2020s. If distributed generation installed power is under 11 kW, it is only allowed to be connected to the low voltage network, not the high voltage network. The first virtual power plant was created in 2017 with wind, solar and hydropower; and geothermal was added in 2020.

== Transmission and storage ==
The transmission system operator is the Turkish Electricity Transmission Corporation (TEİAŞ), which is a state-owned monopoly as of 2022. It is planned to sell a minority share to the private sector in 2022. Transmission is regulated by the Energy Market Regulatory Authority (EMRA). The first long-distance transmission line was from Zonguldak to Istanbul in 1952, and as of 2021 there are 72,000 km. The grid runs at 400 kV and 154 kV, and there are over 700 transmission grid substations. Transmission costs, including losses and operation costs, are shared equally between producer and consumer.

Reducing grid losses and outages is important, as is improving grid quality. Power consumption is often distant from generation, so grid improvements are needed to prevent bottlenecks and increase flexibility. As of 2023 most transformers and many lines need replacing to meet demand, and cause wildfires. There are 11 international interconnectors, including all of Turkey's neighbours by land except Armenia (although relations are improving). A future connection under the Caspian Sea to Turkmenistan and Kazakhstan might be beneficial. Although TEİAŞ is no longer an observer member of ENTSO-E it continues to attend technical discussions of working groups. As of 2020, links with the European Union allow 500 MW export and 650 MW import, whereas trade with other countries is possible but difficult to automate as they do not meet ENTSO-E synchronisation requirements. In 2020 total exports were 2.5 GWh, mostly to Greece, and imports 1.9 GWh, mostly from Bulgaria. More interconnection with Bulgaria and Georgia is being studied.

According to a 2018 study by Sabancı University, 20% of Turkey's electricity may be generated from wind and solar by 2026 with no extra transmission costs, and 30% with a minor increase in grid investment. With the increase in electricity generated by solar panels, energy storage may become more important. Converting existing dams to pumped storage has been suggested as more feasible than new pumped storage. Mobile 10 MW batteries may be useful in the future for reducing temporary transmission congestion between regions, or larger ones for frequency regulation. Adding ice thermal storage to hypermarket cooling systems is estimated to be economically viable.

The nationwide blackout in 2015 was not caused by a natural disaster, but by the limited capacity and lack of resilience of the main east-west connection whilst it was being maintenanced - leaving it unable to redistribute enough of the eastern hydroelectricity to the high consuming west. It did not greatly affect Van Province as it was supplied from Iran, and the EU interconnection helped restore power. More integration with other countries would increase resilience. New wind and solar in the west and centre of the country is closer to demand and is thus reducing the dependence on high voltage transmission.

== Distribution ==
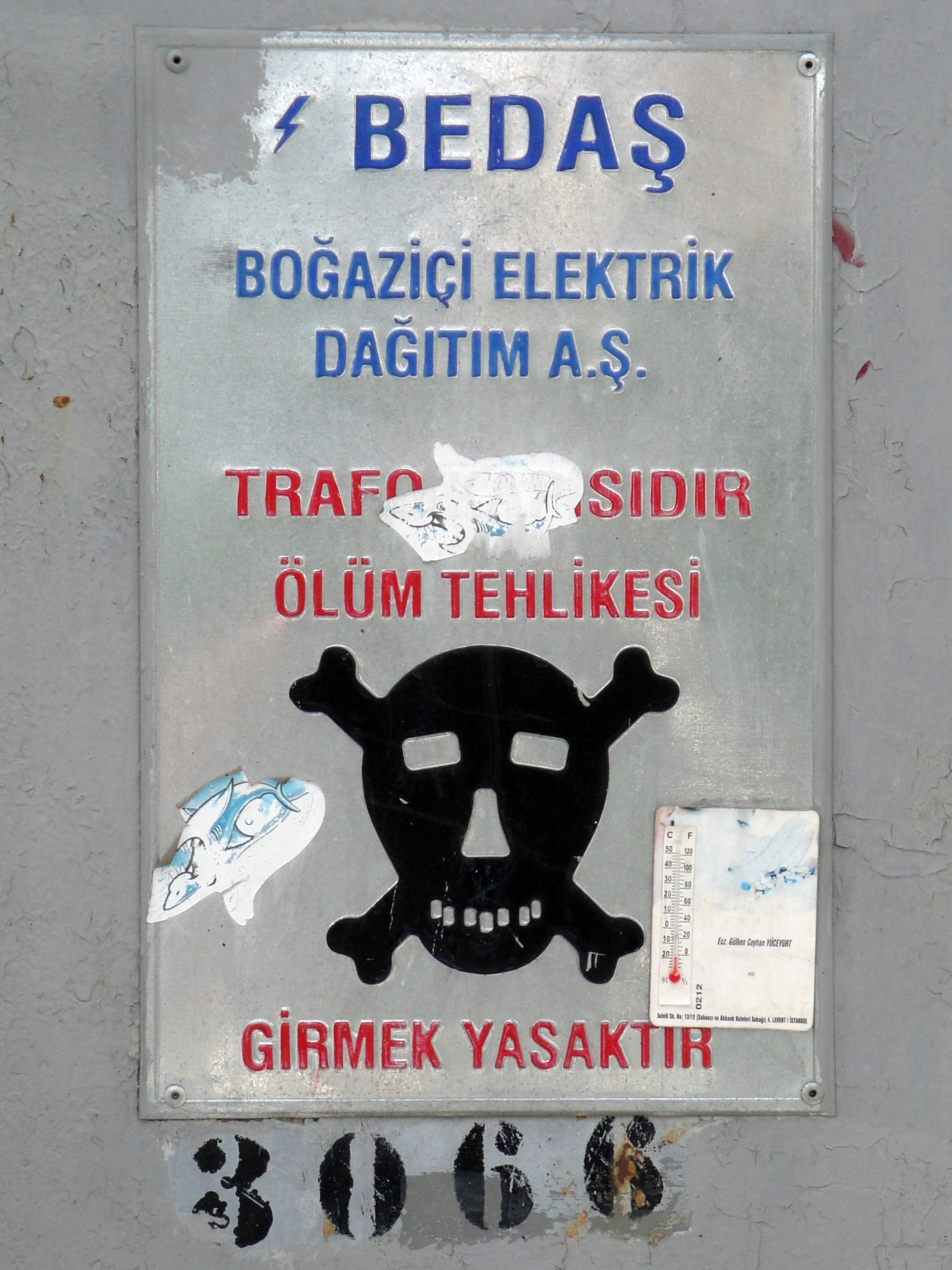
"Danger of death" sign on transformer belonging to the Bosphoros distribution company BEDAŞ (D = dağıtım = distribution)

As part of electricity industry reforms between 2009 and 2013, the ownership of all electricity distribution infrastructure was retained by state owned Turkish Electricity Distribution Corporation (TEDAŞ), but responsibility for operation, maintenance and new investment in distribution networks was transferred to 21 privately owned regional entities under licences from EMRA. Electricity at voltages up to 36 kV is distributed by regional companies and many organized industrial zones.

There are over a million kilometres of distribution lines, of which about 80% are overhead lines and the rest are underground cables. The average losses across all distribution networks (including both technical and non-technical losses) are around 12%. but in Dicle and Vangölü are over 20%.(cite EPDK 2022) In 2019 TEDAŞ estimated the System Average Interruption Duration Index (OKSÜRE in Turkish) at 1308, which is much worse than neighbouring European countries: however no estimate has been published since then. Nevertheless at least one distribution company measures it, together with the related frequency index (OKSIK in Turkish).

There are plans for a smart grid. According to the Shura Energy Center, increasing Turkey's proportion of electric cars to 10% by 2030 would smooth distribution, amongst many other benefits.

According to the Chamber of Electrical Engineers, the regional monopolies make excess profits. Their income is determined by EMRA, as distribution charges are set annually by EMRA.

== Resilience ==
Earthquakes in Turkey are common and sometimes cut transmission lines and destroy substations. If the permanent supervisory control centre of a distribution grid is destroyed in a disaster a mobile centre may take control. The installation of more local solar power with batteries, and microgrids in vulnerable places, might help vital buildings such as hospitals retain power after a natural disaster, such as earthquake or flood. Academics suggest that cost–benefit analysis of such emergency power systems should take into account any benefits of resilience and also the cost of installing an islandable system.

== Market ==
Energy Exchange Istanbul (EXIST), is the electricity market operator company responsible for the day-ahead and intra-day markets. EXIST was established in 2015 and operates under a license from the Energy Markets Regulatory Authority (EMRA). As of 2022 the wholesale price is the same across the country, (Note: PTF means the Day ahead Market Clearing Price and SMF means the Real time System Marginal Price and AOF means the hourly Weighted Average Price all in (TL/MWh)) but it has been suggested that price zones should be defined to reflect network congestion, for example in getting run-of-the river hydropower to consumers. The wholesale price is generally lowest in spring, due to moderate temperatures and abundant hydropower. However solar power, which peaks in summer, is increasing.

Although the wholesale market is operated by EXIST; prices are controlled by EUAŞ, the state electricity generation company. Gas-fired power stations set the market price. The National Load and Dispatch Centre prepares forward estimates of demand for each hour, and these are used to guide scheduling of generation 24 hours in advance.

The Turkish Electricity Transmission Company (TEİAŞ) is the physical operator of the balancing power market and the ancillary services market. Because price is determined at the margin the electricity price is very dependent on the natural gas price. The government has capped the wholesale electricity price at thrice the average of the previous 12 months, which is high enough for gas and imported coal plants to remain in operation even when their fuel costs are high.

Because gas-fired power plants are often the price setters, wholesale electricity prices are strongly influenced by wholesale natural gas prices, which are themselves influenced by the USD exchange rate. Owning over 20% of capacity, the state Electricity Generation Company is a key player in the market along with private wholesalers (such as Enerjisa, Cengiz, Eren, Limak and Çelikler) and an over the counter market. In 2019 150 TWh, about half of the electricity generated, was traded on the day ahead spot market. Market pricing is not completely transparent, cost reflective and non-discriminatory. When the lira falls bilateral contracts are sometimes unable to compete with regulated tariffs: but when the exchange rate is stable industrial customers prefer bilateral contracts (almost no households are on those). In 2021 EXIST launched an electricity futures market.

As of 2021, there is a lot of excess generation capacity and more could be exported. In 2021, Turkey exported 4.1 TWh and imported 2.3 TWh. Over 100 million euros of exports are at risk due to the lack of a carbon price. International trade with some countries is hampered by geopolitical difficulties such as the Cyprus dispute; for example, Turkey will be bypassed by the EuroAsia Interconnector. Because TEIAŞ is not unbundled, it cannot become a full member of the European Network of Transmission System Operators for Electricity (ENTSO-E), but the grids are synchronised and there is technical co-operation. The grid is linked across most land borders, and about 1% of electricity is imported or exported. Technical studies are being done on increasing connections with the European grid. Export capacity to Iraq was increased in the 2020s, and export capacity to Syria.

Some power barges supplying other countries burn heavy fuel oil but plan to convert to LNG. For exports to the EU the Carbon Border Adjustment Mechanism (CBAM) will be phased in from 2023 to 2026. Although Turkish electricity is likely to be cheaper than that generated in the EU, the impact of the CBAM is unclear as of 2021. Kırklareli gas power plant, due to be completed late 2025, is between demand in Istanbul and the border with the EU. More linking transmission is needed, and becoming a full member of ENTSO-E would help exports.

== Retailing ==
Although the 2013 Electricity Market Law says that distribution companies cannot retail, most customers buy from retail "arms" of their local distribution companies. Households that consume over a certain amount, and all non-household customers, can switch suppliers. Retail price increases have often been due to depreciation of the lira. Pricing can vary by region, but there is some redistribution, and electricity is subsidized for about 2 million households. An example of a regional retail company is YEPAŞ (P = perakende = retail).

European wiring color codes are used. Schuko plugs (plug type C with 2 round pins, and type F with 2 round pins and 2 earth clips) and sockets are standard, at 230 V and 50 Hz. For public charging of electric vehicles, the European standard Combined Charging System is used. As of 2022, there are no Tesla superchargers.

After purchasing a property in an urban area, earthquake insurance is compulsory before electricity is connected. In case of natural disasters or pandemics the Ministry of Energy and Natural Resources may cover the financial costs resulting from the postponement (up to one year) of electricity bills, but not the bill amount itself. As of 2022 the VAT rate for residential customers and agricultural irrigation is 8%.

== Economics and finance ==
As elsewhere, new renewables are auctioned. In 2019 the value-adjusted levelized cost of energy (VALCOE - the cost including power system value but not environmental externalities) of onshore wind was slightly less than solar PV, but solar PV is expected to become the most cost-competitive power generation technology by the late 2020s. According to the Chamber of Engineers 75% of electricity in 2021 was dollar indexed. In 2021 new wind and solar was cheaper than existing power stations burning imported coal. As of 2024 a megawatt of electricity from imported coal cost around 50 USD, somewhat less than from gas. As of 2018, if all currently economic renewable projects were developed, the added electricity generation would be sufficient to reduce Turkey's natural gas imports by 20%, and every GW of solar power installed would save over $100 million on the gas bill. According to EMRA exports to the EU accompanied by YEK-G will be exempt from the electricity CBAM.

As of 2019, about 15% of power was generated by the public sector. During the 2010s, power companies borrowed heavily in dollars, but economic growth was overestimated and they overbuilt generating capacity. This resulted in bank debts of $34 billion by 2019 and revenues declining in dollar terms due to the fall in the lira; furthermore, 7% of debts were non-performing. In the early 2020s, Turkish electricity companies still owe much foreign currency, debt is being restructured and plants are changing ownership. In 2021 BOTAŞ charged more for gas than before, leaving gas-fired power stations at a disadvantage to coal-fired power stations.

About half the electricity used in 2019 was generated from local resources. Total import dependency in the power sector was over 50% in 2019. It has, for example, been predicted that more trade would benefit electricity in Bulgaria by stabilizing its price.

The main growth in solar and wind during the 2020s is predicted to be in Renewable Energy Resource Areas(YEKA): these use auctions and include a requirement to manufacture mostly in Turkey. The EU has complained that local content requirements are against trade agreements. Build Own Operate is being used to construct Akkuyu nuclear plant to ensure that responsibility for cost overruns is with Rosatom. Power purchase agreements are offered by the government both for nuclear and local coal. The financing of the National Energy Efficiency Action Plan and continuation beyond 2023 is unclear.

=== Capacity payments ===
The capacity mechanism regulation says that the purpose of the payments to create sufficient installed power capacity, including the spare capacity required for supply security in the electricity market, and/or to maintain reliable installed power capacity for long-term system security. The 2021 capacity mechanism budget was 2.6 billion lira (US$ 460 million). Some hydropower plants, plants burning local coal, and plants older than 13 years burning imported fuel are eligible. In 2022 ten hydro plants, several gas power plants and many lignite-fired plants were eligible for the capacity mechanism: and capacity payments included variable cost components and the market exchange price, as well as fixed cost components and the total installed power capacity by source. These payments have been criticised by some economists. A study published in 2023 surveyed experts and found that most wanted the capacity mechanism to be reformed, for example by including demand response or zonal pricing: however policymakers were not keen on raising the price cap.

=== Feed-in-tariffs ===
As of 2021, feed-in-tariffs in lira per MWh are: wind and solar 320, hydro 400, geothermal 540, and various rates for different types of biomass: for all these there is also a bonus of 80 per MWh if local components are used. Tariffs apply for 10 years. Rates are determined by the presidency, and the scheme replaced the previous USD-denominated feed-in-tariffs for renewable energy. Thus, as in some other countries, the wholesale price of renewable electricity is much less volatile in local currency than the price of fossil fuelled electricity. Another notable aspect of the Turkish renewable energy subsidization program is the strong emphasis on local content, as was the case with additional YEKDEM payments to investments with a degree of locally-manufactured equipment utilization. This local content bonus is awarded for 5 years.

=== End user pricing ===
The complicated system of prices to end consumers is regulated by the government. A green tariff called YETA (the certificates are called YEK-G) to allow consumers to buy only sustainable electricity was introduced in 2021. The YETA price is higher than the regular price by a certain amount per kWh (about 1 lira in 2022).

Electricity prices were greatly increased in early 2022 following a large depreciation of the lira in 2021. Household consumption under 210 kWh a month is priced at a cheaper rate. There is some time based pricing: with 2200 to 0600 being cheapest followed by 0600 to 1700, and 1700 to 2200 being the most expensive. According to Shura Energy Center moving to more time-based end user pricing would be beneficial: with prices being somewhat higher in the early morning and a lot higher in the late afternoon, as there is plenty of sunshine to meet demand in the middle of the day (see also duck curve). Shura suggested in 2020 that future pricing should be more competitive and better reflect costs, with low-income families being continued to be supported with direct payments. Vulnerable families are supported with direct payments for their electricity consumption up to 150 kWh/month. In early 2022, prices for small businesses became a political issue, as they had risen a lot due to global energy prices rises and the depreciation of the lira. There were street protests, and the main opposition Republican People's Party leader Kemal Kılıçdaroğlu refused to pay his own bill in support. The president said that businesses would also be moved to a tiered pricing system, the number of households supported would be almost doubled to four million, and civil society organisations would be moved to the household rate.

In 2023 Shura suggested that the electricity consumption tax (ETV or BTV) of 5% residential, was unfairly disadvantaging electricity over gas, for example by taxing electricity powering heat pumps more than gas for heating. They said that taxes and subsidies for residential gas and electricity should at least be equalized.

== Greenhouse-gas emissions ==
Turkey's coal-fired power stations (many of which are subsidized) are the largest source of greenhouse-gas emissions by Turkey. Production of public heat and electricity emitted 131 megatonnes of CO_{2} equivalent (CO_{2}e) in 2020, mainly through coal burning. (Note: The 2019 carbon content (t/TJ), oxidation factor and CO_{2} emission intensity (t/TJ NCV), respectively, of the main fossil fuels burnt in Turkish power stations were: lignite: 30, 0.966, 107; bituminous coal: 27, 0.983, 97; natural gas: 15, 1, 54; These figures are unremarkable except for the extremely low-quality lignite, which is explained in detail in Coal in Turkey. The CO_{2} emission intensity (or emission factor) shown above is the mass of CO_{2} emitted for each unit of heat produced by burning a fuel. In contrast, the grid emission intensity is the mass of CO_{2}e produced per unit of electricity supplied to the electrical grid. Because thermal power stations generally convert less than half of the heat energy into electrical energy, their numbers for grid emission intensity are much greater than those shown above.) Almost all coal burnt in power stations is local lignite or imported hard coal. Coal analysis of Turkish lignite compared to other lignites shows that it is high in ash and moisture, low in energy value and high in emission intensity (that is Turkish lignite emits more CO_{2} than other countries' lignites per unit of energy when burnt). Although imported hard coal has a lower emission intensity when burnt, as it is transported much further its life-cycle greenhouse-gas emissions are similar to lignite.

Unlike other European countries emission intensity has not improved since 1990 and remains over 400 gm of CO_{2}/kWh, around the average for G20 countries. Investment in wind and solar is hampered by subsidies for coal. According to a 2021 study by several NGOs if coal power subsidies were completely abolished and a carbon price introduced at around US$40 (which is much cheaper than the EU Allowance) then no coal power plants would be profitable and all would close down before 2030. A 2021 decarbonization plan by Istanbul Policy Center, a thinktank, has almost all coal power shutdown by 2035; whereas natural gas plants would continue to run to provide flexibility for greatly increased wind and solar, but at a much lower capacity factor.

The Turkish Solar İndustry Association suggests that building solar plants next to hydropower would help to stabilize output in times of drought. Shura also suggest that excess renewable electricity could be used to produce green hydrogen. Turkey is not aligned with the EU carbon capture and storage directive.

== Policy and regulation ==
As of 2020 Turkey's three main policy objectives are to meet forecast increased demand, a predictable market, and to reduce import costs. To meet these objectives policy includes increasing generation from solar, wind and domestic coal; and starting to produce nuclear energy. As of 2022 some of these generation methods are subsidized – for example EÜAŞ will purchase the forthcoming nuclear power at an agreed price. Coal is heavily subsidized in Turkey. Storage and transmission improvements are also supported - for example increasing the amount of pumped hydro.

The government aims for half of electricity to be from renewable energy by 2023; with capacity targets of 32 GW for hydropower, 12 GW for wind, 10 GW for solar, and 3 GW for biomass and geothermal combined. Shura Energy Transition Center have suggested that longer-term plans and targets would also be useful, together with a policy on distributed generation, market design to incentivize grid flexibility was also suggested. The objectives are developing local manufacturing capacity such as wind turbines, technology transfer and creating a competitive domestic market for low-cost renewable energy. For wind and solar tenders, there is a high domestic content requirement, and imported solar modules are taxed. According to the European Commission the domestic content requirements contradict World Trade Organization and EU–Turkey Customs Union rules. A solar PV factory was opened in 2020. Developing regulation to specify the role of aggregators in providing flexibility, and including energy storage systems and demand-side management within ancillary services, has been suggested.

In 2023 the Chamber of Mechanical Engineers criticised the just published National Energy plan as amateurish: they said that it forecast generation of 174 TWh in 2035 with 57 GW of fossil fuel power plants but that, in 2021, 215 TWh was generated from 46 GW installed. Shura Energy Center said in 2023 that the electricity sector should take the lead in decarbonisation to the 2053 net zero goal. 36% electrification is targeted for 2040, there is no target for 2035 although at COP31 35% by 2035 was proposed globally.

== History ==
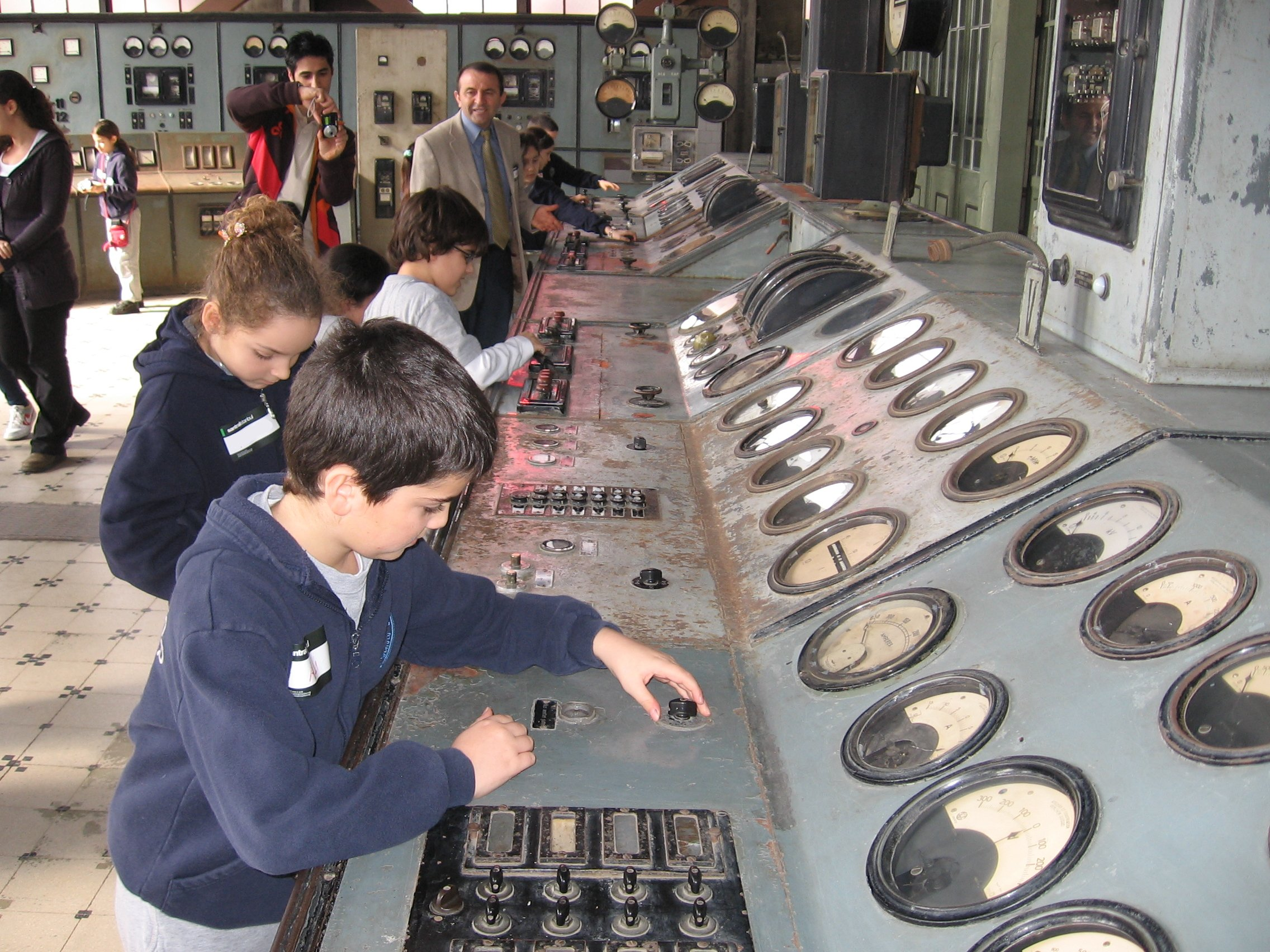
Control room of 1914 Silahtarağa coal-fired power station, now in a museum

In 1875 a French company was awarded a 5 year concession to power Istanbul's Üsküdar district, Thessaloniki and Edirne, and was awarded a 4-year concession for electric lighting of several other cities. However, despite the agreement, no progress was made. The first power station in the Ottoman Empire was a small hydroelectric power station built in 1902 outside Tarsus. Electricity was transmitted to the city centre at high voltage, then distributed to customers at low voltage for their lighting. During this period tenders for power were generally awarded to foreigners, due to lack of Ottoman finance and expertise.

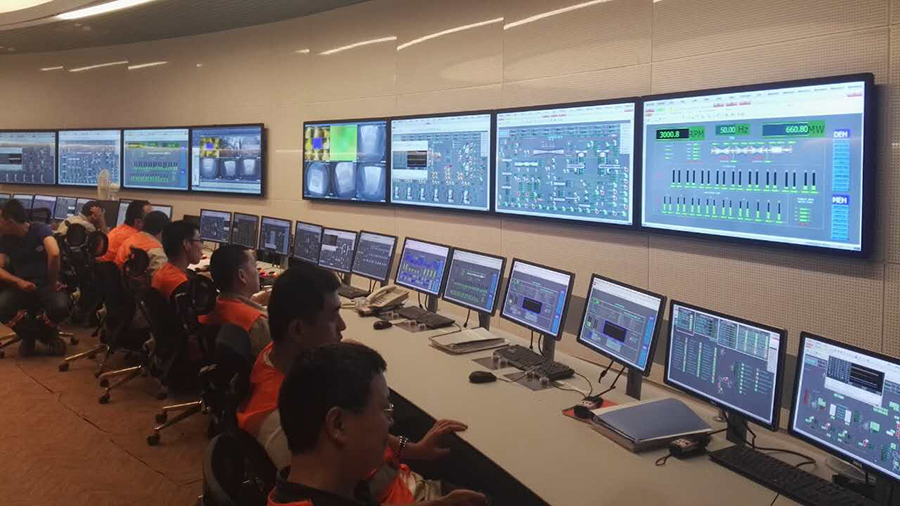
Control room of 2016 Zetes-3 coal-fired power station, which has come under scrutiny by environmental groups for its high carbon emissions.

Generating power in Istanbul for tramlines, lighting and the telephone network from 1914, Silahtarağa Power Station (now a museum that is part of SantralIstanbul) was the first large power station. By the start of the Turkish Republic in 1923, one in twenty people was supplied with electricity. Between 1925 and 1933, many cities built diesel fired power stations, and a couple were powered by wood gas.

The electricity sector was nationalized in the late 1930s and early 1940s, and by the end of nationalization, almost a quarter of the population was supplied with electricity. However only big cities such as Istanbul, Ankara and Izmir received continuous electricity in the 1950s; other cities were electrified only between dusk and 10 or 11 in the evening.

The Turkish Electricity Authority was created in 1970 and consolidated almost all of the sector. By the end of the 20th century, almost all the population was supplied with electricity. Privatization of the electricity sector started in 1984 and began "in earnest" in 2004 after the Electricity Market Law was passed in 2001.

In 2009 electricity demand fell due to the Great Recession. In 2015, there was a one day national blackout, and an independent energy exchange was created. Also in the 2010s, the grid was synchronized with continental Europe, and the Turkish Electricity Transmission Corporation (TEİAŞ) joined the European Network of Transmission System Operators (ENTSO-E) as an observer - although they later left. Energy efficiency and generation goals were set for 2023, the centenary of the establishment of modern Turkey.

== Sources ==
- Artantas, Onur Cagdas (2023). Promotion of Green Electricity in Germany and Turkey A Comparison with Reference to the WTO and EU Law (Book). Springer Cham. ISBN 978-3-031-44759-4.
- Ayas, Ceren (2020). Decarbonization of Turkey's economy: long-term strategies and immediate challenges (Report). CAN Europe, SEE Change Net, TEPAV.
- Difiglio, Prof. Carmine; Güray, Bora Şekip; Merdan, Ersin (November 2020). Turkey Energy Outlook. iicec.sabanciuniv.edu (Report). Sabanci University Istanbul International Center for Energy and Climate (IICEC). ISBN 978-605-70031-9-5.
- Godron, Philipp; Cebeci, Mahmut Erkut; Tör, Osman Bülent; Saygın, Değer (2018). Increasing the Share of Renewables in Turkey's Power System:Options for Transmission Expansion and Flexibility (PDF) (Report). SHURA Energy Transition Center. ISBN 978-605-2095-22-5.
- IEA (March 2021). Turkey 2021 – Energy Policy Review (Technical report). International Energy Agency.
- TEİAŞ 2019-2023 Strateji̇k Plani [Turkish Electricity Transmission Corporation 2019-2023 Strategic Plan] (Report) (in Turkish). Turkish Electricity Transmission Corporation.
- Godron, Philipp; Saygın, Değer (2018). Lessons from global experiences for accelerating energy transition in Turkey through solar and wind power (PDF) (Report). SHURA Energy Transition Center. ISBN 978-605-2095-40-9.
- Saygın, Değer; Tör, Osman Bülent; Teimourzadeh, Saeed; Koç, Mehmet; Hildermeier, Julia; Kolokathis, Christos (December 2019). Transport sector transformation: Integrating electric vehicles into Turkey's distribution grids (PDF). SHURA Energy Transition Center (Report). Archived from the original (PDF) on 2020-08-01.
- Turkey 2021 Report (see chapters: 15 Energy, 27 Environment and Climate change) (Report). European Commission. 2021.
- Turkey's Energy Transition: Milestones and Challenges (PDF) (Report). World Bank. 2015.
- Investor's Guide for Electricity Sector in Turkey (Report). Ministry of Energy and Natural Resources (Turkey). December 2020.
- Turkey Smart Grid 2023 Vision and Strategy Roadmap Summary Report (Report). ELDER, Association of Distribution System Operators. 2018. Archived from the original on 2021-01-31.
- Akyazı, Pınar Ertör; Sperfeld, Franziska; Helgenberger, Sebastian; Şahin, Ümit; Nagel, Laura, eds. (December 2020). Cobenefits Policy Report: Unlocking the co-benefits of decarbonising Turkey's power sector (Report). IASS IPC/UfU.
