= Nuclear Regulatory Authority =

Turkish Governmental agency

- Nükleer Düzenleme Kurumu

Agency overview
- Website: ndk.gov.tr

The Nuclear Regulatory Authority is the regulator for nuclear power in Turkey. Regulators are being trained in Russia and will oversee the Akkuyu Nuclear Power Plant operated by Rosatom.
