= Turkish Electricity Transmission Corporation =

Transmission system operator for electricity in Turkey

- Company type: Government-Owned Corporation
- Industry: Energy
- Genre: Transmission System Operator
- Headquarters: Ankara, Turkey
- Services: Power
- Owner: Government of Turkey (State ownership)
- Website: https://www.teias.gov.tr

Turkish Electricity Transmission Corporation (Turkish: Türkiye Elektrik İletim A. Ş., abbreviated TEİAŞ) is the transmission system operator for electricity in Turkey. It is a government-owned corporation. It is planned for a minority stake to be sold to the private sector before the end of 2022. It reportedly does not co-ordinate with EMRA re YEKA bids as of 2023.

== History ==
In 2006, investigations were begun by ENTSO-E, the European Network of Transmission System Operators, into the technical conditions for the interconnection of the national grid of Turkey to the continental European power system. A trial period of interconnection commenced on 18 September 2010, and after the signing of long term agreements, the interconnection with Europe became a permanent arrangement.

There was a nationwide blackout in 2015.

== Operations ==
According to a study by Sabancı University 20% of Turkey's electricity could be generated from wind and solar by 2026 with no extra transmission costs, and 30% with a minor increase in grid investment.

== Subsidies ==
TEİAŞ distributes extra payments to some power stations in Turkey: some hydro is supported, but this "capacity mechanism" has been criticised as wasting money on too much capacity by supporting some coal fired power stations in Turkey.

== See also ==
- Electricity sector in Turkey
- Energy in Turkey
- European grid
