= Sinop Nuclear Power Plant =

Formerly proposed nuclear power plant in Turkey

- Country: Turkey
- Coordinates: 42°05′11″N 34°58′12″E
- Status: Proposed

Power generation
- Nameplate capacity: 4,800 MW

The Sinop Nuclear Power Plant (Turkish: Sinop Nükleer Enerji Santrali) is a proposed nuclear plant in Turkey located at Sinop on the Black Sea. If constructed, it will be the country's second nuclear power plant after Akkuyu Nuclear Power Plant. In late 2025, a framework agreement with South Korean company KEPCO was signed.

== History ==
The deal for the project on a build-operate-transfer (BOT) basis was signed between Turkish Prime minister Recep Tayyip Erdoğan and his Japanese counterpart Shinzo Abe in May 2013. The project would have been carried out by Atmea, a joint venture consortium of Japanese Mitsubishi Heavy Industries (MHI) and French Areva. Turkey, being geographically on a highly active earthquake-prone zone, relies on top-level safety know-how and experience of Japanese experts against earthquakes.

MHI and Itochu planned to build the power plant, which would have a capacity of around 4,480 MWe. Four generation III pressurized water reactors (PWR) of the type ATMEA1 developed by Atmea would have been installed in the nuclear plant, planned to enter service from 2023 to 2028. French electric utility company Engie would have been in charge of the operation of the nuclear plant. It was intended that Turkish Electricity Generation Corporation (EÜAŞ) would have 20-45% shares in the nuclear plant.

As of June 2015, the total project cost was estimated at approx. $15.8 billion, of which 70% would be debt financed. It was projected that the first unit of Sinop plant would be active by 2023, and the fourth unit would enter service by 2028. As of April 2018, the estimated project cost grew to more than $46 billion.

In 2018 an environmental impact assessment application was submitted to the Environment and Urban Planning Ministry. Location and construction licenses are still to be obtained from the Turkey Atomic Energy Agency.

In April 2018, Nikkei reported that Itochu would withdraw from the project, while MHI and other investors were continuing the feasibility study through the summer of 2018. The remaining members of the Japanese consortium abandoned the project in December 2018 after a failure to reach agreement with the Turkish government on financing terms.

In 2018 the project was abandoned due to construction costs having almost doubled to about $44 billion, largely because of post-Fukushima safety improvements and the fall in the value of the Turkish lira. Indicating that the feasibility study prepared by Japan did not conform with both the expense and the timeframe of the first deal, Turkey stated that Japan and Turkey had agreed to discontinue cooperation in January 2020. In September 2020, the Ministry of Environment and Urbanization approved the final Environmental Impact Assessment (EIA) report of Sinop Nuclear Power Plant.

In 2020 Turkey stated it may hold discussions with other possible suppliers. Talks with China, Russia and South Korea were ongoing in 2023. In 2023 negotiations started with Rosatom for the construction of a large-scale plant with four power units.

However in 2025, South Korea and the Turkish government signed multiple economic cooperation agreements, including the Sinop plant.

== See also ==
- List of commercial nuclear reactors#Turkey
