= Akkuyu Nuclear Power Plant =

Nuclear power plant in the stage of commissioning in Turkey

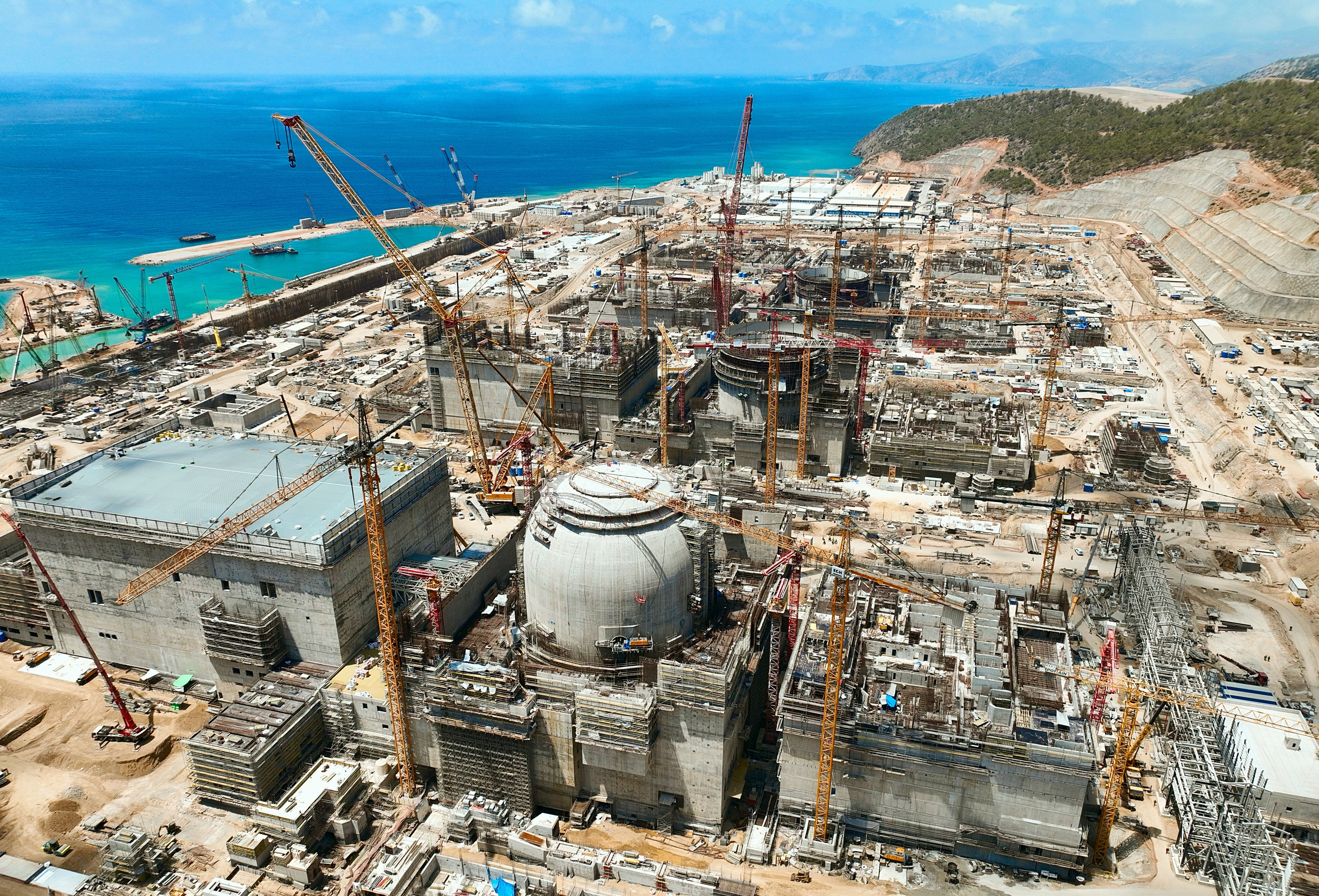
- Akkuyu Plant during construction (2023)
- Official name: Akkuyu Nükleer Güç Santrali A.Ş.
- Country: Turkey
- Location: Akkuyu, Mersin
- Coordinates: 36°08′40″N 33°32′28″E
- Status: Under construction
- Construction began: December 2017
- Construction cost: US$24-25 billion
- Owner: Akkuyu NGS Elektrik Üretim A.Ş.
- Operator: Rosatom

Nuclear power station
- Reactor type: Gen III+ PWR
- Reactor supplier: Atomstroyexport
- Cooling source: Mediterranean Sea
- Thermal capacity: 4 × 3200 MW_{th} (planned)

Power generation
- Make and model: 4 x VVER-1200/509
- Units under const.: 4 × 1114 MW
- Nameplate capacity: 4456 MW (planned)

External links
- Website: www.akkuyu.com
- Commons: Related media on Commons

The Akkuyu Nuclear Power Plant (Turkish: Akkuyu Nükleer Güç Santrali) is a large nuclear power plant in Turkey under construction in Akkuyu, Büyükeceli, Mersin Province. It is expected to generate around 10% of the country's electricity when completed. The official launch ceremony took place in April 2015, and the first reactor is expected to come online in 2026 after a three year delay.

In May 2010, Russia and Turkey signed an agreement that a subsidiary of Rosatom would build, own, and operate a power plant in Akkuyu comprising four 1,200 MWe VVER1200 units. Construction of the first reactor commenced in April 2018. In February 2013, Russian nuclear construction company Atomstroyexport (ASE) and Turkish construction company Özdoğu signed the site preparation contract for the proposed Akkuyu Nuclear Power Plant. The contract includes excavation work at the site.

It is expected to be the first build–own–operate nuclear power plant in the world. Nuclear power operators get tax breaks until 2045.

== History ==
In May 2010, Russia and Turkey signed an agreement that a subsidiary of Rosatom — Akkuyu NGS Elektrik Uretim Corp. (APC: Akkuyu Project Company) — would build, own, and operate a power plant at Akkuyu comprising four 1,200 MW VVER units. The agreement was ratified by the Turkish Parliament in July 2010. Engineering and survey work started at the site in 2011.

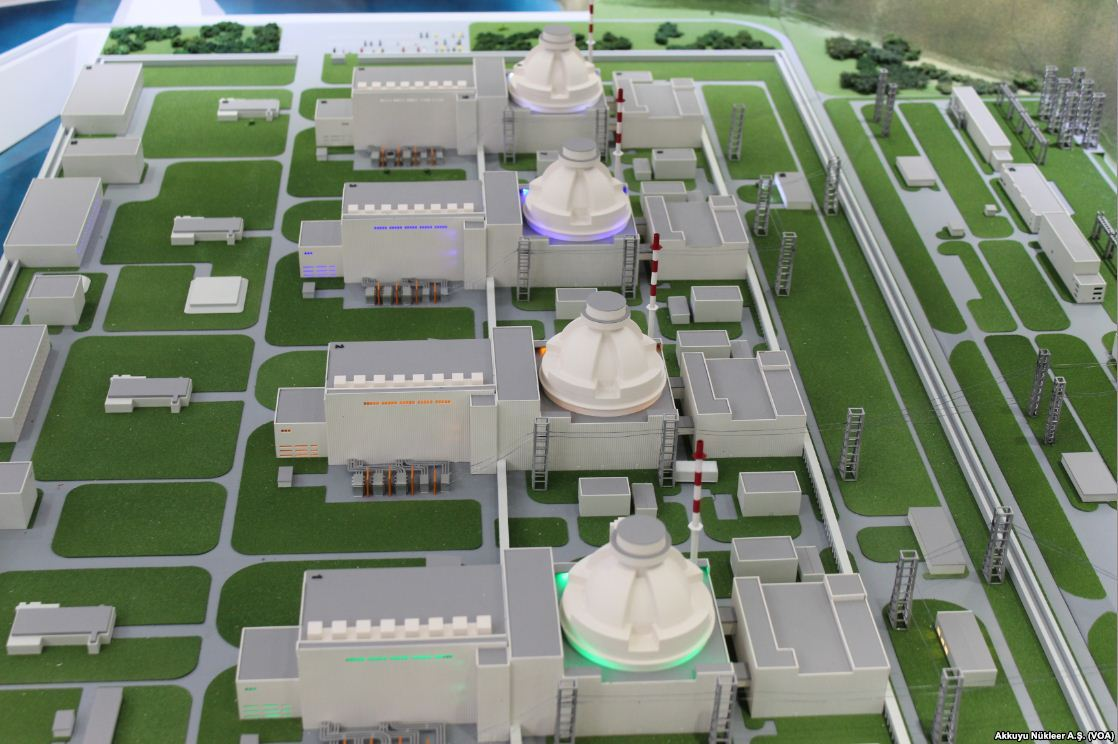
Model of the plant (2012)

In 2013, Russian nuclear construction company Atomstroyexport (ASE) and Turkish construction company Ozdogu signed the site preparation contract for the proposed Akkuyu nuclear power plant. The contract includes excavation work at the site.

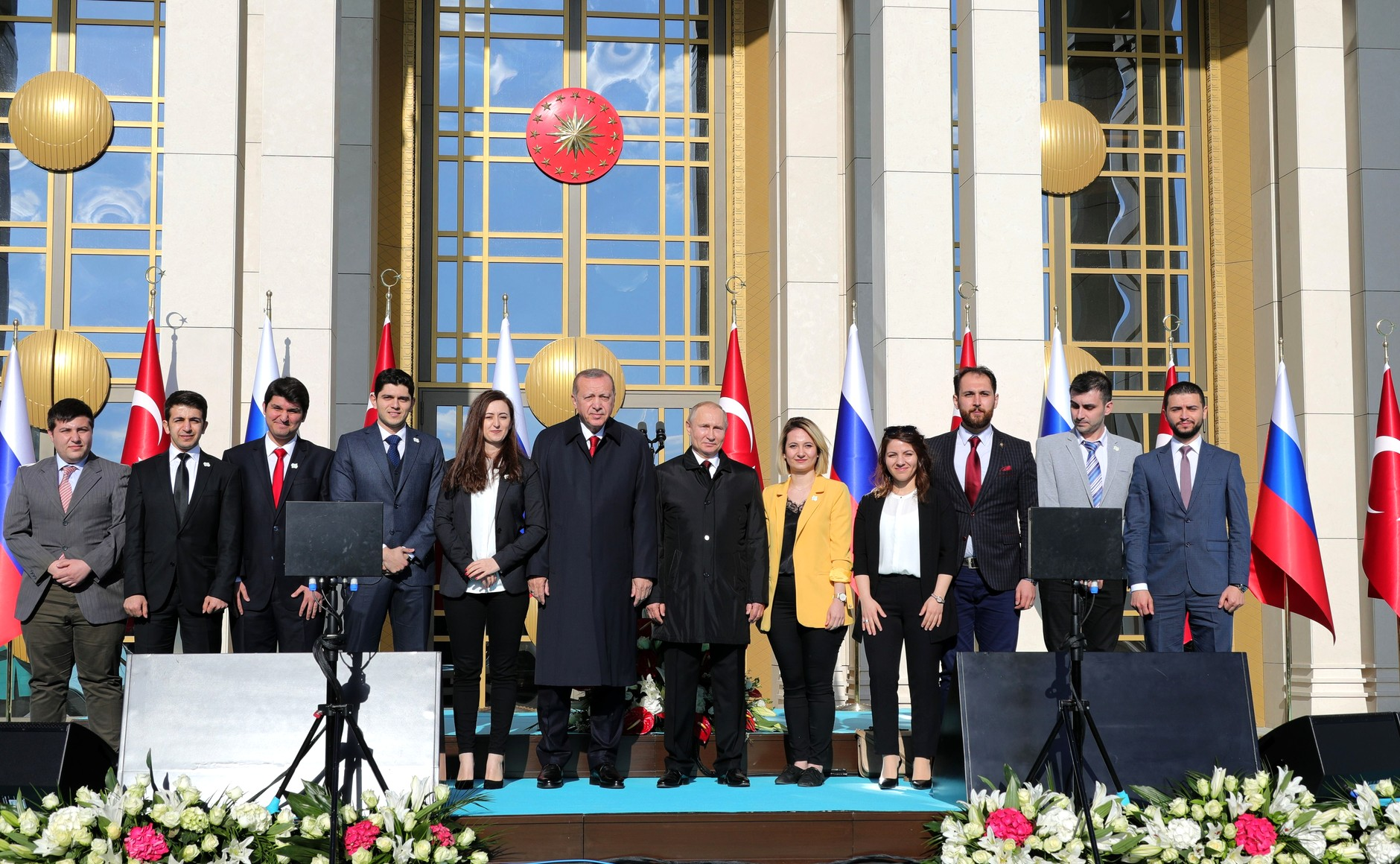
Recep Tayyip Erdoğan and Vladimir Putin at the Akkuyu Nuclear Power Plant ground-breaking ceremony on 3 April 2018, Ankara

The official launch ceremony took place in April 2015.

On 9 December 2015, the news agency Reuters reported that Rosatom stopped construction work at the power plant and that Turkey was assessing other potential candidates for the project. But Rosatom and the Turkish Energy and Natural Resource Ministry promptly refuted the statement. Despite tensions mounted between Russia and Turkey, due to the Turkish downing of a Russian fighter jet on 24 November (2015), Russian President Vladimir Putin stated that the decision to continue is purely a commercial one. A source told RIA Novosti that the company set up to construct the nuclear plant continued its operations in Turkey.

Major construction started in March 2018. In March 2019, the concrete basemat of unit 1 had been completed.

Construction of the second unit started on 26 June 2020. Steam generators for unit 1 were completed by Atommash later in August to be shipped to Turkey. Around the same time, a core melt trap for unit 2 to contain a nuclear meltdown arrived at Akkuyu to be placed in the plant. GE Steam Power (now Arabelle Solutions) is supplying four Arabelle steam turbines manufactured at Belfort, France, for the project, the first in January 2021.

Akkuyu Nuclear Power Plant's Construction Organization Director is Denis Sezemin.

The first unit was expected to become operational in 2023, but in 2022 Rosatom was having difficulty obtaining equipment from suppliers. In September 2023, it was expected to become operational in October 2024. In January 2025, the first unit was expected to become operational at the end of the year, and the other three were expected to become complete by 2028. In December 2025, the government expected full operational status of unit 1 in 2026. The nuclear plant was inaugurated on 27 April 2023 with the delivery of the first nuclear fuel to the plant site.

In 2024, Turkish authorities announced the arrest of a Russian employee of the plant on suspicion of being a member of the Islamic State and living under false identity papers.

In 2025, Turkey announced that Russia would provide US$9 billion in financing for the Akkuyu power plant, with the goal of having the first reactor producing power in 2026 after being delayed from an initial 2023 completion date.

== Economics ==
Financing is provided by Russian investors, with 93% from a Rosatom subsidiary. Up to 49% of shares may be sold later to other investors.

Turkish Electricity Trade and Contract Corporation (TETAS) has guaranteed the purchase of 70% power generated from the first two units and 30% from the third and fourth units over a 15-year power purchase agreement. Electricity will be purchased at a price of 12.35 US cents per kW·h and the remaining power will be sold in the open market by the producer. According to energy analysts this price is high.

According to President Erdoğan nuclear power will make the country more economically independent. Although it will be technically possible to ramp power up and down, because fuel is a small part of the cost and operating costs remain the same there is almost no economic benefit in load-following, therefore nuclear is expected to supply baseload power. For baseload power levelized cost of electricity (LCOE) and value-added LCOE (VALCOE) are the same. In 2020 Shura Energy Center forecast that for nuclear power that will be 80-85 USD/MWh in 2040.

Operator liability is limited to 700 million euros, and above that will be the responsibility of the Nuclear Damage Detection Commission. On 21 April 2026, Rosatom chief Alexey Likhachev stated that the Iran war has intensified interest in the Akkuyu nuclear plant by exposing the fragility of the global energy balance and underscoring the need for countries to have reliable domestic electricity sources.

== Flexibility ==
The minimum load for the plant is expected to be 50%. In normal operation power output could be decreased at 1% of the reactor’s nominal capacity per minute and increased at 3% per minute. In case of grid emergencies, these rates can increase to 20% and 5% respectively. However, "load following mode generates more radioactive waste as a result of adjusting the coolant level and concentration of boric acid in the reactor". The plant is instead expected to provide baseload power.

== Objections ==
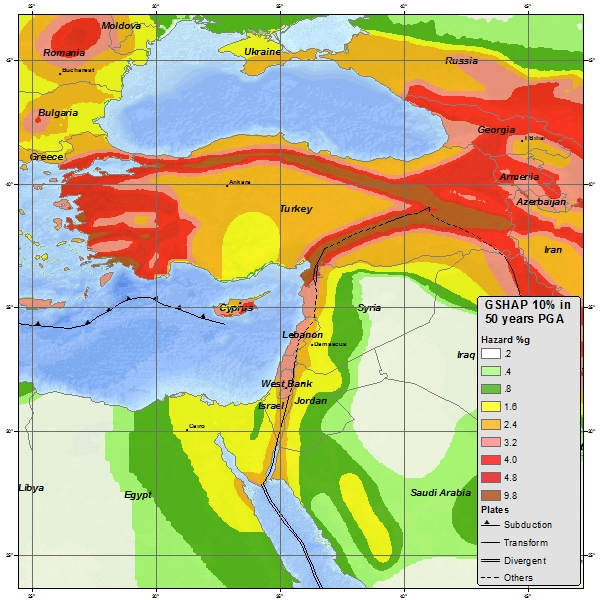
Turkey seismic hazard map

One objection is that Büyükeceli and the surrounding coastline may lose its touristic potential after the realization of the project. However, the president of the township's commercial counsel Alper Gürsoy also added that nuclear energy is necessary for Turkey's economy and that the construction of such a large plant may benefit the town economically.

In 2011, a human chain was formed in Mersin to protest the decision.

In 2015, it was reported that the signatures of specialists on a government-sanctioned environmental impact report had been forged. The specialists had resigned six months prior to its submission, and the contracting company had then made unilateral changes to the report. The revelation sparked protest in North Nicosia. The construction of the Akkuyu plant is controversial in Cyprus, because it is close to the island.

It has been suggested that the plant will affect Russia–Turkey relations by prolonging Turkey's dependence on Russian energy, beyond natural gas. It has been suggested that there is a risk of algal blooms. It has been suggested that spent fuel pools are at risk of military action or terrorism.

== Reactor data ==
Unit	Type / Model	Capacity	Construction start	Operation start	Notes
Akkuyu 1	VVER-1200/509	1114 MW	3 April 2018	2026 (planned)	
Akkuyu 2	VVER-1200/509	1114 MW	8 April 2020	2027 (planned)	
Akkuyu 3	VVER-1200/509	1114 MW	10 March 2021	2027 (planned)	
Akkuyu 4	VVER-1200/509	1114 MW	21 July 2022	2028 (planned)	

Expected lifetime is 60 years and after that a 20 year extension may be possible. Expected annual generation is 35 billion kWh when complete.

When operating at full power about one million cubic meters of cooling water per hour will be used and returned to Akkuyu Bay.

A megatsunami like that caused by the Minoan eruption could reach the reactors. In case that or another event caused a meltdown there are core catchers, which are traps below the pressure vessels to catch and cool anything which falls out. The site was undamaged by the 2023 Turkey–Syria earthquake.

== Regulation ==
In 2007, a bill concerning construction and operation of nuclear power plants and the sale of their electricity was passed by parliament. It also addresses waste management and decommissioning, providing for a National Radioactive Waste Account and a Decommissioning Account, which generators will pay into progressively.

The International Atomic Energy Agency (IAEA) has recommended "enacting a law on nuclear energy which establishes an independent regulatory body and putting a national policy in place that covers a wide range of issues, as well as further developing the required human resources".

In 2018, Turkey created the Nuclear Regulatory Authority. It took over most of the duties of Turkish Atomic Energy Authority (TAEK) like issueing licenses and permits to companies operating nuclear energy and ionizing radiation facilities. TAEK was renamed as TENMAK, and it is now exclusively liable for the management of radioactive waste. According to a scholar, providing concessions for nuclear power plants via international agreements rather than competitive tenders means such projects cannot be challenged in the constitutional court.

== Waste ==
The spent fuel is high-level waste and will be returned to Russia. As of 2019, all other radioactive waste in Turkey is sent to TENMAK storage in Küçükçekmece designed for low and intermediate level waste. However it was reported in 2022 that low and intermediate level waste will be compressed and stored on site. But it was also reported in 2022 that a site had not been selected.

In 2021, parliament passed the bill “Joint Convention on the Safety of Spent Fuel Management and on the Safety of Radioactive Waste Management” and ratified the Convention on Civil Liability Against Third Parties in the Field of Nuclear Energy. Law 7381 is partly about waste.

== See also ==
- List of commercial nuclear reactors#Turkey
- Nuclear power in Russia
- Bushehr Nuclear Power Plant, Iran
- El Dabaa Nuclear Power Plant, Egypt
- Barakah nuclear power plant, UAE
