= Sarayköy Nuclear Research and Training Center =

Turkish nuclear research center

Sarayköy Nuclear Research and Training Center Sarayköy Nükleer Araştırma ve Eğitim Merkezi
- Abbreviation: SANAEM
- Formation: July 1, 2005; 21 years ago
- Type: GO
- Location: Kazan, Ankara Province, Turkey
- Coordinates: 40.06269°N 32.60680°E
- Parent organization: TAEK

The Sarayköy Nuclear Research and Training Center (Turkish: Sarayköy Nükleer Araştırma ve Eğitim Merkezi), known as SANAEM, is a nuclear research and training center of Turkey. The organization was established on July 1, 2005, as a subunit of Turkish Atomic Energy Administration (Turkish: Türkiye Atom Enerjisi Kurumu, TAEK) at Kazan district in northwest of Ankara on an area of 42.3 ha (105 acres).

The center can be visited for technical purposes upon application.

== Laboratories ==
SANAEM is accredited to perform following metrology:

- total alpha and beta radioactivity analysis in drinking water,
- Tritium analysis in drinking water,
- analysis of Cs-134 and Cs-137 radionuclides in food,
- analysis of Ra-226, Th-232, Cs-137 and K-40 radionuclides in earth and building materials,
- analysis of Ra-226, U-234 and U-238 isotopes with alpha particle energy spectrometry method in water.

The center consists of a wide range of laboratories as listed below:

- Alpha/beta particle spectroscopy laboratory,
- Liquid scintillation spectrometry laboratory,
- Alpha particle spectrometry laboratory,
- Gamma particle spectrometry laboratory,
- C14 dating laboratory,
- Radon screening laboratory,
- Analytical measurement and analysis laboratories,
- Chemical elements and stable isotopes analysis laboratory,
- Chromatography laboratory,
- Spectroscopy laboratory,
- Nuclear electronics laboratory,
- Film dosimetry laboratory,
- Thermoluminescent dosimetry laboratory
- Finger ring dosimetry laboratory,
- Environmental radiological monitoring activity,
- Medical physics applications laboratory,
- Radiation source quality control test laboratory,
- Molecular genetics laboratory,
- Stable isotopes laboratory,
- Differential scanning calorimetry and Thermogravimetric analysis in material characterization laboratory,
- Microscopy laboratory,
- Nuclear fusion laboratory,
- Plasma physics laboratory,
- Nuclear fission laboratory,
- Radiation microbiology laboratory,
- Food microbiology laboratory,
- Food irradiation determination laboratory,

== Gamma radiation facility ==
Three gamma radiation units are in service for sterilization of disposable medical supplies and food irradiation.

== Electron accelerator facility ==
The electron accelerator is the only one in the country. It has 500 keV energy and 20 mA current.

== Proton accelerator facility ==
The country's first proton accelerator facility (Turkish: Proton Hızlandırıcı Tesisi, TAEK-PHT) is housed in a separate building of two stories built on a ground area of 3,100 m^{2} (33,000 sq ft). The building consists of a cyclotron room, four target rooms, six production laboratories, three quality control laboratories, a R&D laboratory and storage rooms for material and waste.

Facility's groundbreaking was held on February 24, 2010. The building was constructed by the Turkish Housing Development Administration (TOKİ), and it was completed on December 12, 2010. The installation of the proton accelerator and all the equipment needed concluded in 2011. The facility was officially opened on May 30, 2012, by Prime Minister Recep Tayyip Erdoğan.

The cyclotron type proton accelerator "CYCLONE-30" has a variable beam energy between 15 and 30 MeV and variable beam current up to 1.2 mA. It was designed, manufactured and installed by Belgian Ion Beam Applications S.A. (IBA). The cyclotron cost 11.6 million EUR.

With the cyclotron, four beamlines can be generated, three beamlines for radioisotope production and one for research and development works. With the proton bombardment following radioisotopes are produced in three separate target rooms:

- Indium-111, gallium-67, thallium-201 on solid target material,
- Fluorine-18 on liquid target material,
- Iodine-123 on evaporated target material.

These radioisotopes and radiopharmaceuticals produced from those radioisotopes are used for the diagnosis and therapy of diseases like cancer, neurological disorder, brain physiology and pathology as well as coronary artery disease.

By producing radioisotopes and radiopharmaceuticals, the facility conducts research work in the fields of medicine, industry, agriculture, food, biotechnology, animal husbandry and heath physics.
