= Kırklareli gas power plant =

Gas fired power station in Turkey

Kirklareli gas power plant
- Country: Turkey
- Coordinates: 41°32′45″N 27°14′38″E

Power generation
- Nameplate capacity: 82 MW

Kirklareli gas power plant is an 890 MW gas-fired power station in Kırklareli in north-western Turkey, developed by ENKA through its subsidiary ENKA Kırklareli Elektrik Üretim A.Ş. The plant operates on a 1x1x1 combined-cycle configuration, featuring a GE 9HA.02 gas turbine and a D650 steam turbine. Construction began in November 2022. In February 2026, Turkey's Ministry of Energy officially accepted the 590 MW GE 9HA gas turbine, confirming its technical compliance for operation. Once the steam turbine is commissioned, the plant's total installed capacity will reach 890 MW. It is not to be confused with the much older and smaller plant owned by Alarko.
