= Istanbul Technical University TRIGA Mark-II Training and Research Reactor =

Turkish nuclear research reactor

ITU Triga Mark II
- Operating institution: Istanbul Technical University
- Location: Istanbul, Turkey
- Type: TRIGA
- Power: 250 kW (thermal)

Construction and upkeep
- Construction cost: $20 million TL
- First criticality: 11 March 1979

Technical specifications
- Max thermal flux: 8.1e12 n/cm^2-s
- Max fast flux: 1.8e12 n/cm^2-s
- Cooling: Light water
- Neutron moderator: Light water, zirconium hydride
- Neutron reflector: Graphite, light water
- Control rods: Boron carbide 3 per element

ITU TRIGA Mark-II Training and Research Reactor is a nuclear research reactor located in Istanbul Technical University in Turkey. It is a light water reactor, the 54th TRIGA in the world designed and manufactured by General Atomics. The facility was opened on 11 March 1979.

It is second operational and third installed nuclear research reactors in Turkey, the other being in Çekmece Nuclear Research and Education Center.
