= Historical Tarsus hydroelectric power plant =

First hydroelectric plant in Turkey

Coordinates: 36°56′23″N 34°53′29″E

The historical Tarsus hydroelectric power plant is a defunct hydroelectric power plant, notable for being the first hydroelectric plant in Turkey.

== Location ==
Tarsus is a populous ilçe (district) center in Mersin Province. The plant was in the Fahrettin Paşa neighborhood of Tarsus, in a place known as Bentbaşı, about 1,800 metres (5,900 ft) from Tarsus city center.

== History ==
The plant was suggested by an Austrian engineer named Dörfler. According to a rumour the first suggestion was a plant in the capital Istanbul, which was rejected by the Ottoman sultan Abdülhamit II. One of the sultan's viziers, Hulusi Pasha, who was of Tarsus origin, convinced the sultan to approve a plant in Tarsus, far from the capital. The plant was put into operation on 15 September 1902, about 20 years later than the first commercial electricity production in the world.

== Technical details ==
The first plant was a dynamo driven by a watermill on Berdan River. Its output was only 2 kW. The primitive water mill was replaced by a turbine from İtalo Sulssera, which increased the output, and some of the more important streets were electrically lighted. Even then only a few houses could use electricity. Moreover there were no switches and the dynamo operation was halted during the nights. There were no electricity meters and consumers paid according to the number of electric bulbs they used.

== Aftermath ==
During World War I a second plant was established, and, after the war, the municipality sold the plant to a private firm. According to research by Professor Hamit Serbest, after many handovers the plant building was used as a fertilizer factory.
