= Turkish Energy, Nuclear and Mineral Research Agency =

Turkish Governmental agency

Agency overview
- Website: tenmak.gov.tr

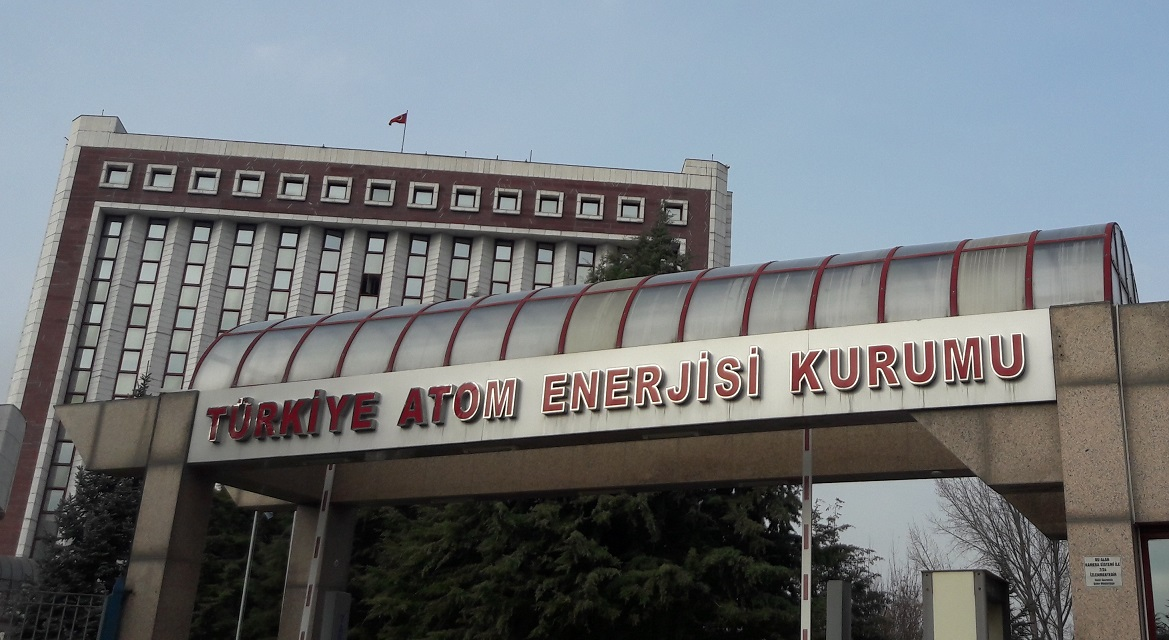
The former agency.

The Turkish Energy, Nuclear and Mineral Research Agency was formed from other agencies and the Turkish Atomic Energy Authority which was the official nuclear energy institution of Turkey. The headquarters is located in Ankara since 1956, the year it was founded. Among its objectives are high level of academic research in nuclear energy, development and implementation of peaceful nuclear tools.

== See also ==
- ANAEM Ankara Nuclear Research and Training Center
- ÇNAEM Çekmece Nuclear Research and Training Center
- SANAEM Sarayköy Nuclear Research and Training Center
