= ÇNAEM =

Turkish research center

Çekmece Nuclear Research and Training Center Çekmece Nükleer Araştırma ve Eğitim Merkezi
- Abbreviation: ÇNAEM
- Formation: March 6, 1958; 68 years ago
- Type: GO
- Location: Küçükçekmece, Istanbul Province, Turkey
- Coordinates: 41.02900°N 28.75448°E
- Director: Ass. Prof. Dr. Gürsel Karahan (since ?)
- Parent organization: TAEK
- Website: www.taek.gov.tr/en/institutional/affiliates/cekmece-nuclear-research-and-training-center.html

The Çekmece Nuclear Research and Training Center (Turkish: Çekmece Nükleer Araştırma ve Eğitim Merkezi), known as ÇNAEM, is the primary nuclear research and training center of Turkey. The organization was established on March 6, 1958 as a subunit of Turkish Atomic Energy Administration (Turkish: Türkiye Atom Enerjisi Kurumu, TAEK) at Küçükçekmece district in the west of Istanbul. The organization's name was coined on August 12, 1960 in conjunction with its location.

The groundbreaking of the facility at the eastern shore of Lake Küçükçekmece to house the country's first nuclear research reactor was held in 1959. After completion of the construction and the start of the operation of the research reactor, the official opening of the center took place on May 27, 1962 in the presence of President Cemal Gürsel.

== Organization ==
The acquired valuable knowledge and experience at the institution led in 2010 to the reorganization of ÇNAEM. The six main service divisions newly established are:

=== Nuclear Technics Division ===
Application of nuclear technics in industry, medicine and research such as non-destructive (NDT)tests, radiopharmasotics.

=== Nuclear Electronics Division ===
Production and calibration of radiation monitors, radioactive measurement devices etc. Calibration of ionizing radiation gauges and dosimeters in the industry, medicine and security, as well as for scientific purposes.

=== Nuclear Technology Division ===
Research and operation of research reactor, reactor materials in compliance with international and national regulations for nuclear safety, particularly IAEA safeguards and subsidiary agreements.

=== Radioactivity Analysis and Analytics Division ===
Radioactivity analysis of all food, liquid, construction materials etc. Soil and water analysis for environmental purposes.

=== Waste Management Division ===
Operation of Cekmece low level radioactive waste processing and storage facility (CWPSF). R&D activities in low and high level nuclear wastes, processing and shielding materials. Implementation of national waste management programme.

=== Health Physics Division ===
Radiation Protection, controlling before licensing and radiobiological application.

== Research reactor TR-1 ==
The pool-type reactor having a capacity of 1 MW that was named TR-1, achieved criticality on January 6, 1962 at 19:14 local time.

After serving 15-year long for the production of radioisotopes and the neutronics experiments with the help of beam tubes, the TR-1 was shut down on September 9, 1977 as its capacity became insufficient.

== Research reactor TR-2 ==
Due to increased demand in the 1970s on nuclear research and radioisotopes in the country, the installation of a second nuclear research reactor with higher capacity was projected for the production of radioisotopes only. The reactor with an output capacity of 5 MW, called TR-2, went into service in the same building and the existing pool after becoming criticality in December 1981. The reactor started radioisotope production in 1984.

== See also ==
- ITU TRIGA Mark-II Training and Research Reactor
