= 2003 blackout =

2003 blackout may refer to:

- 2003 Italy blackout, a serious power outage that affected all of the Italian Peninsula for 12 hours
- 2003 London blackout, a serious power outage that occurred in parts of southern London and north-west Kent
- Northeast blackout of 2003, a widespread power outage throughout Northeastern & Midwestern US and Ontario
