= 2026 Sumatra blackout =

Power outage in Indonesia

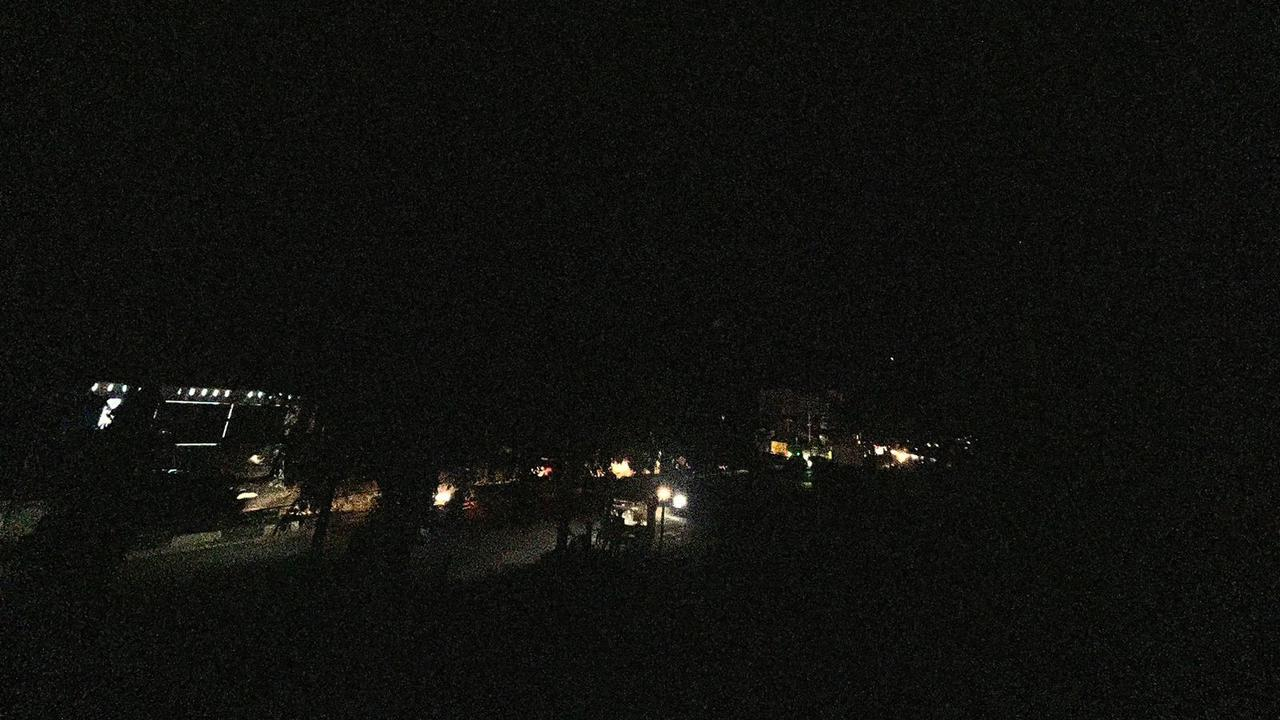
- Power outage in Langsa, Aceh
- Date: 22–26 May 2026
- Time: Around 18:45 WIB
- Duration: Approximately 6–10 hours daily
- Location: Aceh, North Sumatra, West Sumatra, Riau, Jambi, Bengkulu, South Sumatra, Lampung
- Type: Blackout
- Cause: Electric current disruption
- Deaths: 4

On 22 May 2026 until 26 May 2026, almost the entire of Sumatra Island experienced blackout. Four provinces in the islands were severely affected, namely Aceh, West Sumatra, North Sumatra, Riau, and Jambi.

== Impact ==
=== Aceh, North Sumatra, and West Sumatra ===
Provinces Aceh, North Sumatra, and West Sumatra experienced a simultaneous blackout on 22 May 2026 around 18:45 WIB. While Aceh was reported to have recovered by 22:00, some regions eventually reported another blackout the next day, followed by a cutting off of water pipeline, causing water shortage.

West Sumatra experienced an overall recovery by 23 May 2026, 01:00. Padang reported an increase in traffic from citizens travelling to the city center, reportedly for the purpose of charging their devices. North Sumatra, especially in Medan, did not report a recovery until 13:00 the next day.

Riau began to be affected by the outage on 22 May 2026 around 19:00 WIB. The west part of the province reported a recovery at around 06:00 the next day, however the outage returned at around 08:00. Meanwhile the eastern half reported recoveries by 21:00 the same day, but was hit by another outage at around 05:00 the next day. The power outage also caused a water crisis considering most houses still use personally powered pumps for water.

=== South Sumatra, Jambi, Bengkulu and Lampung ===
South Sumatra, Jambi, Bengkulu, and Lampung were also affected by blackouts simultaneously on 22 May 2026 around 18:45 WIB, which in most regions ended by around 22:00, while some only received power by 02:00 the next day. A 5,3 magnitude earthquake hit Bengkulu immediately after, causing a temporary cutting of power by PLN.

By 24 May 2026, some regions in Jambi were still affected by rolling blackouts, including Bungo Regency, Merangin Regency, Jambi City, and Muaro Jambi Regency.

== Casualties ==
On 23 May 2026, three people in Tanah Datar Regency, West Sumatra suffered carbon monoxide poisoning while using a generator in a mosque during the blackout, leaving two dead and one critically injured.

On the same day, four shop workers in Air Putih District, Batubara Regency, North Sumatra were also affected by carbon monoxide poisoning from generator fumes. This left two dead and two critically injured.

== Cause ==
The power outage was caused by a disruption on the 275 kV transmission between Muara Bungo dan Sungai Rumbai di Bungo Regency, Jambi, which was due to bad weather.

According to PLN, the outage was caused by a "power swing", an extreme oscillation of power exacerbated by said bad weather.

At 18:44 WIB, heavy rains in Jambi caused a disruption in the two 275kV circuits on the south-bound transmission, which ended up cutting the main 500kV line off from the entire Sumatra power grid, effectively splitting the island's power into two.

The southern half experienced a surplus in power, but it was quickly remedied. Meanwhile, the northern half has been cut off from the remaining power, causing power generation to also gradually deactivate.

== Reactions ==
Coordinating Minister Agus Harimurti Yudhoyono requested PLN to investigate the cause of the power outage. PLN, in turn, issued an apology for the island-wide blackout, promising no further outages after this. PLN, through manager Kisaran Harry Marbun, has also issued a statement that the message claimed to have been received before the actual blackout by some members of the public in Sumatra from the company informing of a blackout from 22-25 May 2026 for 8-10 hours was false.

Indonesia's National Consumer Protection Agency (BPKN - Badan Perlindungan Konsumen Nasional) urged the people of Sumatra to file a mass lawsuit to PLN following the blackout.

== See also ==
- Northeast blackout of 2003
- 2003 Italy blackout
- 2005 Java–Bali blackout
- 2012 India blackouts
- 2019 Java blackout
