= 2019 Java blackout =

Power Outage in Java, Indonesia

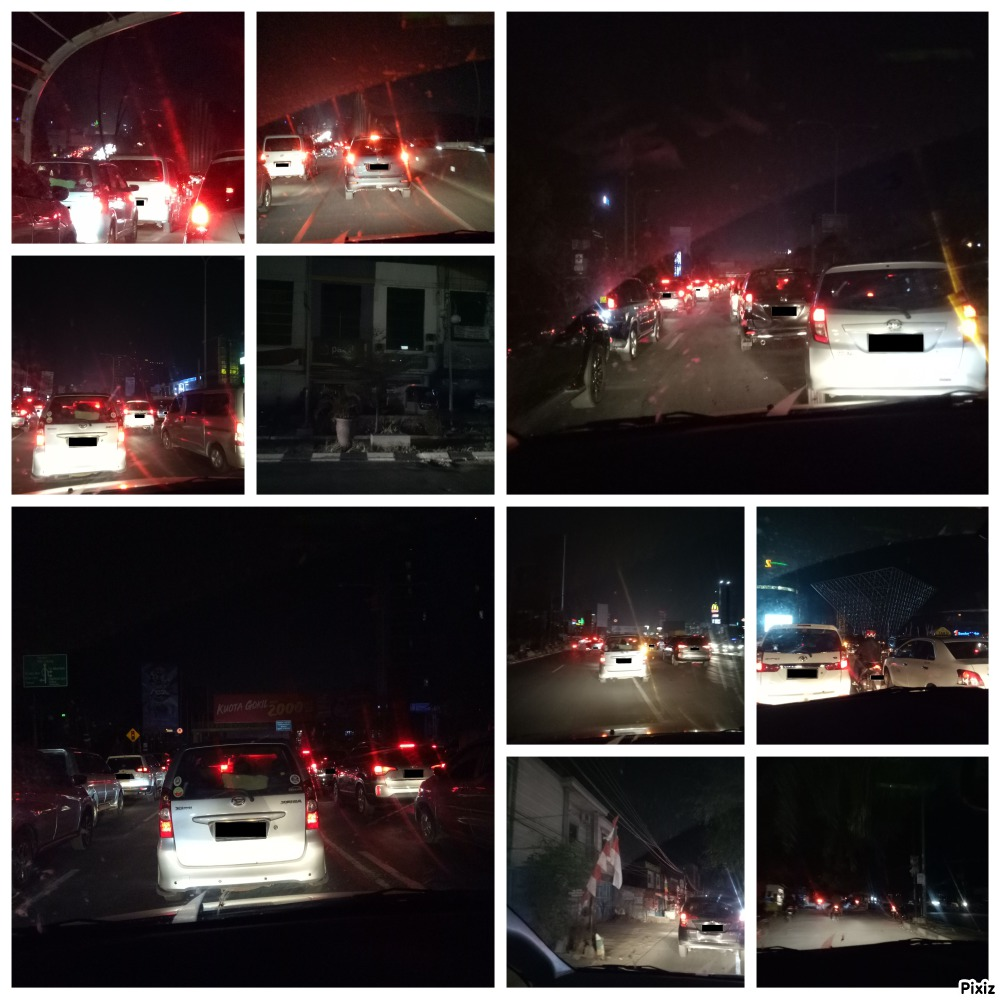
- Bekasi during blackout
- Date: 4–5 August 2019
- Time: 11.50 WIB–finish (depending on the area)
- Location: Banten, Jakarta, West Java, parts of Special Region of Yogyakarta, Central Java and East Java, Indonesia
- Type: Blackout
- Cause: Electric current disruption
- Outcome: Around 21.3 million people affected by power outage. 4 deaths
- Property damage: Rp 90 billion (estimates by PLN)

The 2019 Java blackout was a power outage that occurred across much of Java on August 4, 2019, 11:50 (UTC+7) to August 5, 2019, at 22:00 (UTC+7) (depending on area).

== Areas affected ==
Satellite imagery at night on August 2–6 in western Java during the blackout

Areas affected by power cuts include the Greater Jakarta area including Jakarta, Banten, West Java, parts of Special Region of Yogyakarta, Central Java and East Java. In West Java, areas affected by the power cuts included Bandung, Bekasi, Cianjur, Cimahi, Cirebon, Garut, Karawang, Purwakarta, Majalaya, Sumedang, Tasikmalaya, Depok, Gunung Putri, Sukabumi, and Bogor. In Banten, the area affected was Cilegon.

== Cause ==
The cause of the blackout was confused in Perusahaan Listrik Negara (The State Electricity Company)'s initial announcements. At first, PLN cited disruptions in gas turbines 1 to 6 at the Suralaya Power Plant and some other disruptions at the Cilegon Power Plant. PLN then corrected the reason by citing a disturbance on the transmission side of Ungaran and Pemalang 500 kV which resulted in energy transfers from east to west failing. PLN expressed its apology regarding this.

Ultimately, the limited number of east–west transmission lines on the island caused the blackout. After a lightning strike disabled one transmission line, the only other became overloaded and automatically removed itself from service. The network west of the break had insufficient generation, and could not shed enough load to recover. The network east had excess generation, and survived without blacking out.

== Impact ==
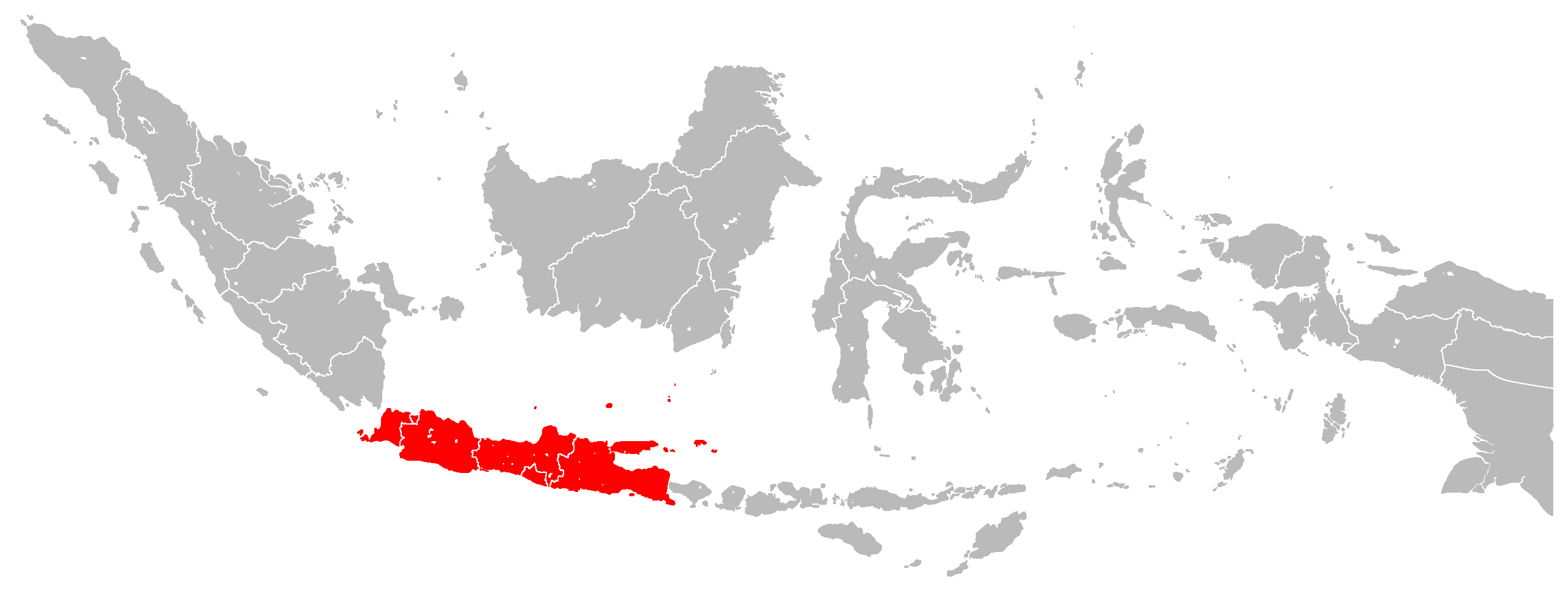
Provinces affected by the blackout. Not all areas within the political borders are affected.

The blackout began at 11:50 local time, when Jakarta MRT authorities began to detect the loss of electrical supply, rendering its trains inoperable and requiring people stuck inside to evacuate. Jakarta LRT and KRL Commuterline also suffered from the blackout making TransJakarta the only mass transit transportation remaining in operation at the time of the blackout. The governor of Jakarta, Anies Baswedan made TransJakarta and Jakarta MRT services free of charge until the end of the day.

In the telecommunications sector, the telephone network was also disrupted. Disrupted networks included Telkomsel, Indosat, XL Axiata, 3, and Smartfren. Gojek and Grab had problems due to the lack of internet services.

Around 21.3 million people were affected by the power outage. The blackout lasted around 9 hours where at 21:00 local time, power to most of the affected areas has been restored. Power to some rural and residential areas in Jakarta had not been restored past midnight. Some areas initially had electricity restored by midnight or later, only to have it cut off again.

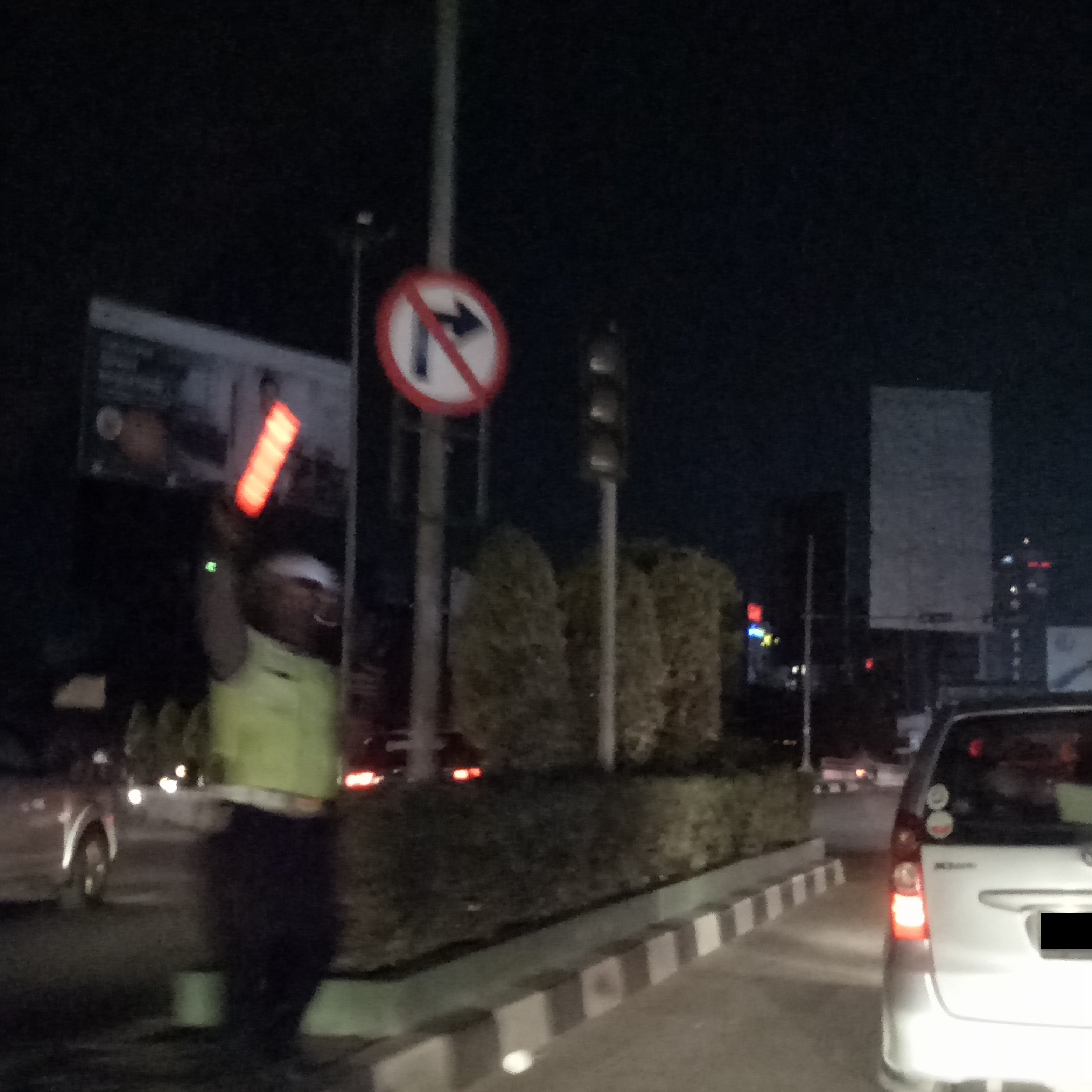
A police officer managing traffic when the electricity went out in Bekasi

Most of the traffic lights of Jakarta stopped functioning.

At least eight fires occurred on Sunday night and Monday morning in eight different locations due to the power outage. This probably had happened due to the use of candles as lighting during the power outage.

The blackout became viral on Twitter. The hashtag #MatiLampu topped the worldwide trending topics with 8,873 tweets. Other tweeted hashtags include #MatiListrik, #ListrikPadam, and #Blackout. Netizens also compared the #MatiLampu hashtag with a Ria Ricis video titled "Saya Pamit".

== See also ==
- Northeast blackout of 2003
- 2003 Italy blackout
- 2005 Java-Bali Blackout
- 2012 India blackouts
- 2026 Sumatra blackout
