= Air Putih =

Air Putih may refer to:

- Air Putih, Batu Bara, a district in North Sumatra, Indonesia
- Air Putih (Penang state constituency)
- Air Putih (Terengganu state constituency)
