= 2012 India blackouts =

Widespread power outages in India

Map of affected states: In Northern India In Eastern and North-Eastern India

Two severe power outages affected most of northern and eastern India on 30 and 31 July 2012. The 30 July 2012 blackout affected over 400 million people and lasted about 13.5 hrs. During that period, it was the largest power outage in history by number of people affected, beating the January 2001 blackout in Northern India (230 million affected). Similar conditions caused a blackout on the next day, which remained the largest power outage in history as of May 2025. The outage on 30 July affected more than 620 million people (9% of the world population at the time and half of India's population), spread across 22 states in Northern, Eastern, and Northeast India. An estimated 32 gigawatts of generating capacity was taken offline. Of the affected population, 320 million initially had power, while the rest lacked direct access. Electric service was restored in the affected locations between 31 July and 1 August 2012.

== Background ==
India is the world's third largest producer and consumer of electricity after the United States and China; but has long suffered from unreliable electrical infrastructure. The northern electrical grid had previously collapsed as recently as 2001. Around the time of the blackouts, an estimated 27% of energy generated was lost in transmission or stolen. About 25% of the population, about 300 million people, had no electricity at all. Peak supply fell short of demand by an average of 9%, and the nation suffered from frequent power outages that lasted as long as 10 hours. Efforts were underway (and continue) to reduce transmission and distribution losses, and increase production.

The private sector had spent $29 billion to build their own independent power stations in order to provide reliable power to their factories, and the five biggest consumers of electricity in India had private off-grid supplies. In total, Indian companies had 35 GW of private off-grid generation capacity at the time of the blackouts and planned to add another 33 GW to their off-grid capacity in the aftermath.

Administratively, the Indian electrical power system is divided into Northern, Western (which, despite the name, is south of the Northern region), Southern, Eastern, and Northeastern regions. The Southern region only connects through high-voltage direct current (HVDC) interties, but the other four systems operate in synchrony. All operate at a nominal 50 Hz. The Northern region also operates an internal HVDC line to transport power from generators in the east to consumers in the west.

On the days of the blackout, utilities had taken multiple parallel transmission lines out of service for scheduled maintenance, leaving few transmission circuits connecting the Western and Northern grid regions. The monsoon stressed the few remaining lines. However, there was also unusually large electrical demand, and the Northern Region imported 4-6 GW of power from its neighbors.

== Sequence of events ==
=== 30 July ===
In addition to the transmission lines under maintenance, multiple interties between the Western and Northern regions tripped out of service on the evening preceding the blackout, leaving only the 400 kV Bina-Gwalior line connecting the Western and Northern regions. The line was sized to transfer about 700 MW power with optimum efficiency, but could carry substantially more without damage, and at the time of the blackout carried about 1450 MW. The Northern and Western Regions' Load Despatch Centres (LDCs) requested that the Northern region shed load and the Western region reduce generation to unload the power line, but neither utility did so adequately.

At 02:35 a.m. IST (21:05 UTC on 29 July), the high load on the Bina-Gwalior line tripped the line's circuit breakers. Power flowing from the Western region to the Northern region now had to circle through the Eastern region, and transmission losses from the new routing left the Northern region undersupplied. Consequently, it began to lose frequency, and circuit breakers on the Northern-Eastern transmission lines acted to separate the now-out-of-sync grids. Although the Northern region had incorporated underfrequency load shedding devices adequate to compensate for the missing imported power, the scheme failed to perform as designed and the Northern grid collapsed. All major power stations were shut down in the affected states, causing an estimated shortage of 32 GW.

Officials described the failure as "the worst in a decade", and a power company director noted that the "fairly large breakdown...exposed major technical faults in India's grid system. Something went terribly wrong which caused the backup safety systems to fail."

More than 300 million people, about 25% of India's population, were without power. The Associated Chambers of Commerce and Industry of India (ASSOCHAM) stated that the blackout had "severely impacted" businesses, leaving many unable to operate. Railways and some airports were shut down until 08:00, although the busiest airport in South Asia, Delhi Airport, continued functioning on backup power. The outage caused "chaos" for Monday morning rush hour, as passenger trains were shut down and traffic signals were non-operational. Trains stalled for three to five hours. Several hospitals reported interruptions in health services, while others relied on back-up generators. Water treatment plants were shut down for several hours, and hundreds of thousands of people were unable to draw water from wells powered by electric pumps. Oil refineries in Panipat, Mathura and Bathinda continued operating because they have their own captive power stations within the refineries and do not depend on the grid.

It took 15 hours to restore 80% of service, which Power Grid Corporation of India chairman's called "a record time".

=== 31 July ===
The following day recapitulated much of the July 30 collapse. Again, few grid lines connected the Western and Northern regions; again, those interties loaded beyond usual service; again, the LDCs requested the Northern region shed load and the Western region reduce generation; again, the utilities' reaction was too small; and around 13:02 IST (07:32 UTC), again the Western and Northern regions separated, with power circling through the Eastern region grid. However, unlike the previous day, the phase shift between the Northern and Western region grids extended into the Eastern region. Rather than separating from the overloaded Northern grid, the Eastern grid instead separated from the Western region, from which it had imported power. Then the disaster continued along similar lines to the previous day: the Northern grid remained overloaded and the underfrequency load-shedding scheme failed to act.

As a result, power stations across the affected parts of India went offline. NTPC Ltd. stopped 38% of its generation capacity. Over 60 crore (600 million) people (nearly half of India's population), in 22 out of 28 states in India, were without power.

More than 300 intercity passenger trains and commuter lines were shut down as a result of the power outage. The worst affected zones in the wake of the power grid's collapse were Northern, North Central, East Central, and East Coast railway zones, with parts of Eastern, South Eastern and West Central railway zones. The Delhi Metro suspended service on all six lines, and had to evacuate passengers from trains that stopped mid-journey, helped by the Delhi Disaster Management Authority.

About 200 miners were trapped underground in eastern India due to lifts failing, but officials later said they had all been rescued.

The National Disaster Management Authority (NDMA), not normally mandated to investigate blackouts, began to do so because of the threat to basic infrastructure facilities like railways, metro rail system, lifts in multi-storey buildings, and movement of vehicular traffic.

The following states were affected by the grid failure:

- states on the northern grid: Delhi, Haryana, Himachal Pradesh, Jammu and Kashmir, Punjab, Rajasthan, Uttar Pradesh, Uttarakhand
- states on the eastern grid: Bihar, Jharkhand, Odisha, West Bengal, Sikkim
- states on the northeast grid: Arunachal Pradesh, Assam, Manipur, Meghalaya, Mizoram, Nagaland, Tripura

The following regions were not directly affected by the power outage:

- Narora, Renukoot and Simbhaoli in Uttar Pradesh
- parts of Delhi such as Badarpur
- areas served by Sterlite and Ib Thermal Power Station (most of western Odisha)
- most of the Kolkata municipal area (CESC system)

As of 2 August, Uttar Pradesh was being supplied about 7 GW power, while the demand was between 9 and 9.7 GW.

== Reactions ==
On the day of the collapse, Power Minister Sushilkumar Shinde ordered a three-member panel to determine the reason for the failure and report on it in fifteen days. In response to criticism, he observed that India was not alone in suffering major power outages, as blackouts had also occurred in the United States and Brazil within the previous few years.

Washington Post described the failure as adding urgency to Indian Prime Minister Dr. Manmohan Singh's plan for a US$400 billion overhaul of India's power grid. His plan calls for a further 76 gigawatts of generation by 2017, produced in part by nuclear power.

Rajiv Kumar, secretary general of the Federation of Indian Chambers of Commerce and Industry (FICCI) said, "One of the major reasons for the collapse of the power grid is the major gap between demand and supply. There is an urgent need to reform the power sector and bring about infrastructural improvements to meet the new challenges of the growing economy."

On 1 August 2012, newly appointed Power Minister Veerappa Moily stated, "First thing is to stabilize the grid and it has to sustain. For that we will work out a proper strategy." He declined to blame specific states, saying, "I don't want to start with the blame game."

Team Anna, the supporters of anti-corruption activist Anna Hazare, charged that this grid failure was a conspiracy to suppress the indefinite fast movement started on 25 July 2012 for the Jan Lokpal Bill and targeting Sharad Pawar.

Some trade papers noted that West Bengal's CESC microgrid and the Southern region had survived the blackout, and proposed further decentralization of the Indian grid. United States Agency for International Development (USAID) proposed that India's post-blackout investment strategy should attempt to develop a "smart grid."

== Investigation ==
The three-member investigation committee consisted of S. C. Shrivastava, A. Velayutham and A. S. Bakshi. It examined the causes of the blackout, and practicability of ensuring continued rail services during grid collapse, and issued its report on 16 August 2012. The committee found multiple systemic factors that predisposed the grid to collapse.

In general, utilities appeared to have invested little in blackout prevention, or done so pro forma. Power dispatch centers had insufficient monitoring tools to manage power flows, and used unreliable cell phone services to communicate with power plant control centers. Any islanding schemes appeared nonfunctional. Power stations appeared to have had adequate generation capacity to avoid the blackouts, but had (contrary to regulations) not implemented droop speed control on their governors, or set it aggressively enough.

Many heavily loaded transmission lines appeared to have inadequate parallel power storage facilities, such that an underload at one end might appear as an overload at the other. Rather than installing power storage, many utilities had simply removed the transmission lines from service. Local distribution networks also appeared overtaxed, forcing power flows onto the bulk power distribution system unnecessarily.

The committee also suggested that contracts in the Indian legal system misrepresented the physics of the electrical grid. Utilities unexpectedly drawing power from their neighbors did not have to compensate those neighbors for the power. Consequently utilities only declared expected flows to avoid regulatory fines. However, regulators incorrectly believed that they lacked legal authority to decrease the official capacity of failed grid segments in real time.

The proximate cause of the blackouts was the multiple existing outages (both scheduled and forced) that had limited inter-regional power transmission corridors on the days of the failures. These induced high loading on 400 kV Bina–Gwalior–Agra link, such that the grid could not survive loss of that link. The blackout then occurred when grid operators failed to reduce loading on the link and the link's protection system mistakenly removed it from service.

The committee also noticed that the grid appeared to have insufficient black start capability, requiring two separate rounds to bring all power plants on line. Conversely, power plant protection systems appeared insufficiently aggressive, as separation from the grid under high load had physically damaged the machinery in multiple thermal power plants. However, delays in restarting the grid appeared to arise from constraints other than physical, as gas turbine power plants had also required an unduly long start-up time.

The investigation also refuted rumors that the grid had been brought down by a cyberattack.

== See also ==
- Electricity sector in India
- Northeast blackout of 2003
- 2003 Italy blackout
- Power outage
- 2019 Java blackout
- 2026 Sumatra blackout
