= Mettlen–Lavorgo powerline =

400 kV overhead powerline in Switzerland

Lukmanier Powerline

Location
- Country: Switzerland
- From: Mettlen (Inwil)
- Passes through: Lukmanier Pass; Sisikon; Ingenbohl
- To: Lavorgo

Ownership information
- Owner: Swissgrid

Construction information
- Commissioned: 1949

Technical information
- Type: overhead line
- Current type: AC
- Total length: 105 km (65 mi)
- AC voltage: 400 kV

The Mettlen–Lavorgo powerline, also called the Lukmanier powerline, is the 400 kV three-phase alternating current high voltage electric power transmission line over the Lukmanier Pass in Switzerland, from Mettlen substation (47°6′55″N 8°20′15″E), next Inwil, about 7-kilometre (4.3 mi) south of Hochdorf, to Lavorgo substation (46°26′28″N 8°50′20″E), next Lavorgo, about 5-kilometre (3.1 mi) south of Faido. Trees falling on the line in 2003 caused a major blackout in Italy.

== History ==
The powerline was built in 1948–1949. In 2006, 17 transmission towers between Sisikon and Ingenbohl and in 2008, 28 transmission towers between Arth and Küssnacht am Rigi were replaced.

On 28 September 2003, during a storm, two trees hit the powerline in Brunnen, causing a major blackout in Italy. The loss of power affected most of all peninsula; nearly 50 million people remained cut-off for up to 18 hours.

== Description ==
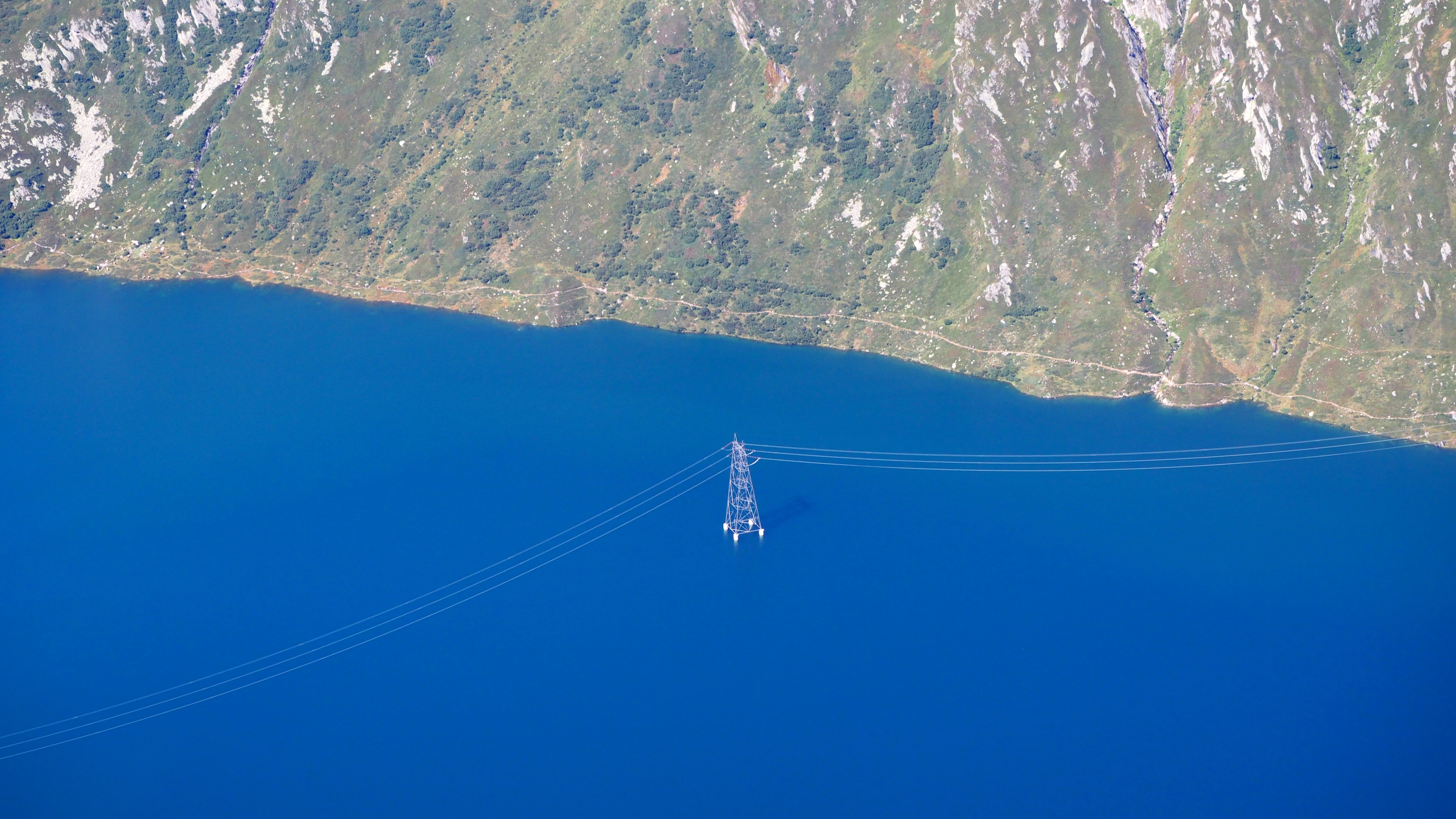
The powerline crossing the lake of Santa Maria

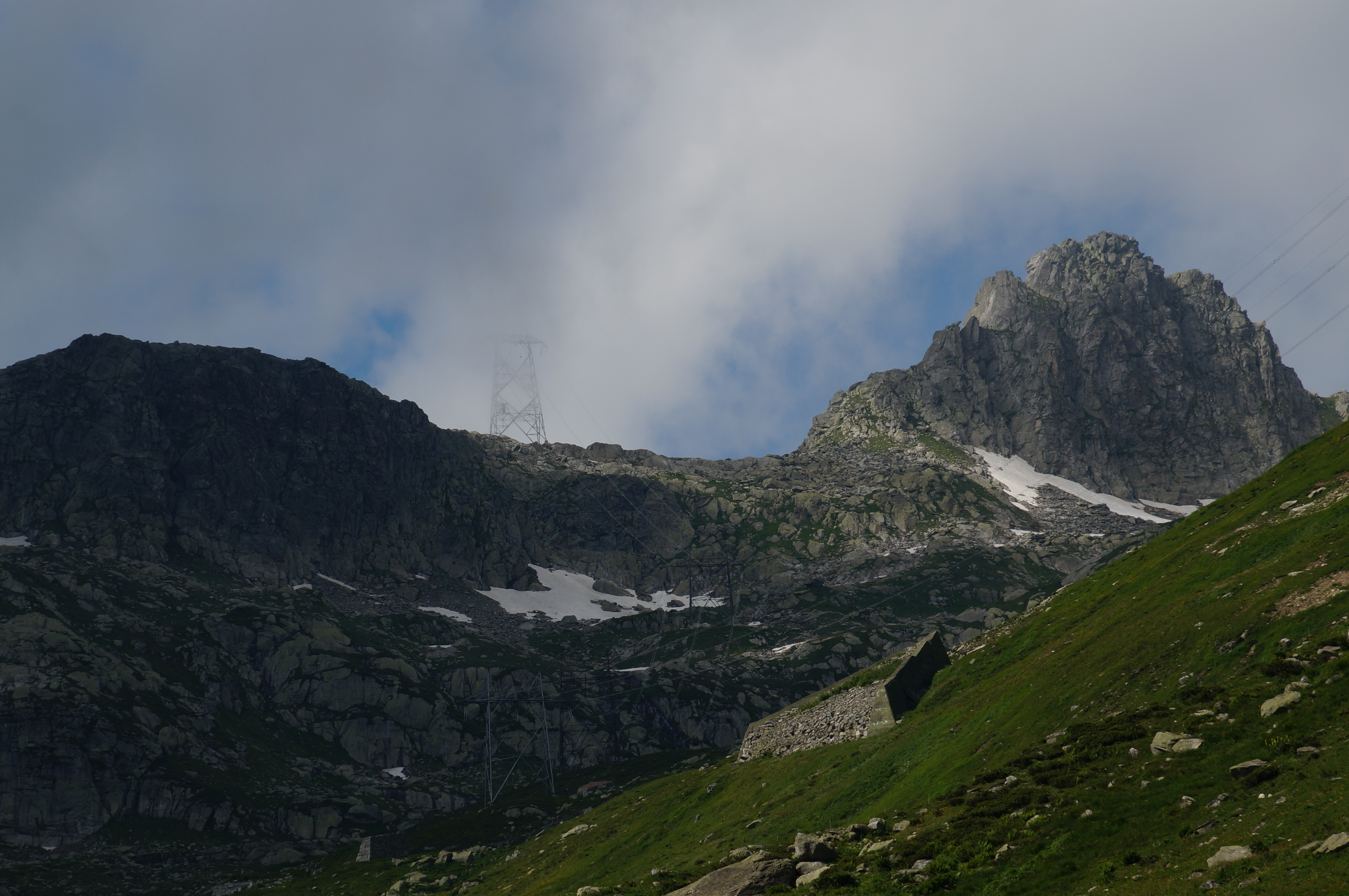
The culminating point of the line

On the 52-kilometre (32 mi) long section from Mettlen to Amsteg it shares the pylons with the Gotthard Powerline. After Amsteg the Lukmanier Powerline runs on its own track.

On the section between Mettlen and Amsteg 160 pylons are used with two level and three level arrangements of the conductors. For the 53-kilometre (33 mi) long section between Amsteg and Lavorgo over the Lukmanier Pass 145 pylons for one circuit with one level arrangement of the three conductors are used. The mean height of the used pylons is 30 metres (98 ft).

A unique aspect of this line is the 75-metre-high (246 ft) anchor pylon, which stands on 28-metre-high (92 ft) feet of concrete in the artificial lake of Santa Maria, canton Graubünden. This pylon was built in 1949 as a normal pylon. At the construction of the Santa María Dam it was replaced in 1957 by the existing pylon on concrete feet to protect the steel construction from the water and at wintertime from ice on the lake. This pylon carries one crossarm for one circuit. The mean span width of the line is 350 metres (1,150 ft), the biggest span width between two pylons is 890 metres (2,920 ft). As conductors bundles of two and three conductors of Aldrey (an aluminium-magnesium-silicon alloy) with a cross section of 550 square millimetres (0.85 sq in) are used. The diameter of each single conductor is 30.5 millimetres (1.20 in). As ground wire two steel ropes with a cross section of 80 square millimetres (0.12 sq in) are used.

In the Mittelplatten area, the culminating point, the powerline consists of the highest transmission tower in the Swiss power grid, stationed 2,490 metres (8,170 ft) above sea level. The steel lattice mast is 43.5 metres (143 ft) tall.

== Sources ==
- Elektro-Energietechnik 2, Prof. Dipl.-Ing. Dr. sc. techn. Gerhard Schwickaardi, AT Verlag Aarau, 1979, pages 218–220
- Gerhard Schwickardi, Elektro-Energietechnik. Energie-Übertragung, Netze, Energieverteilung, Freileitungen, Kabelleitungen, Schaltgeräte, Schaltanlagen, Energie-Umformung, Messwandler, Transformatorenstationen, Unterwerke, Automatisierung von Schaltwarten, Band 2, Aarau, Stuttgart 1979 ISBN 3-85502-032-9
