= 2005 Java–Bali blackout =

2005 power outage across Java and Bali, Indonesia

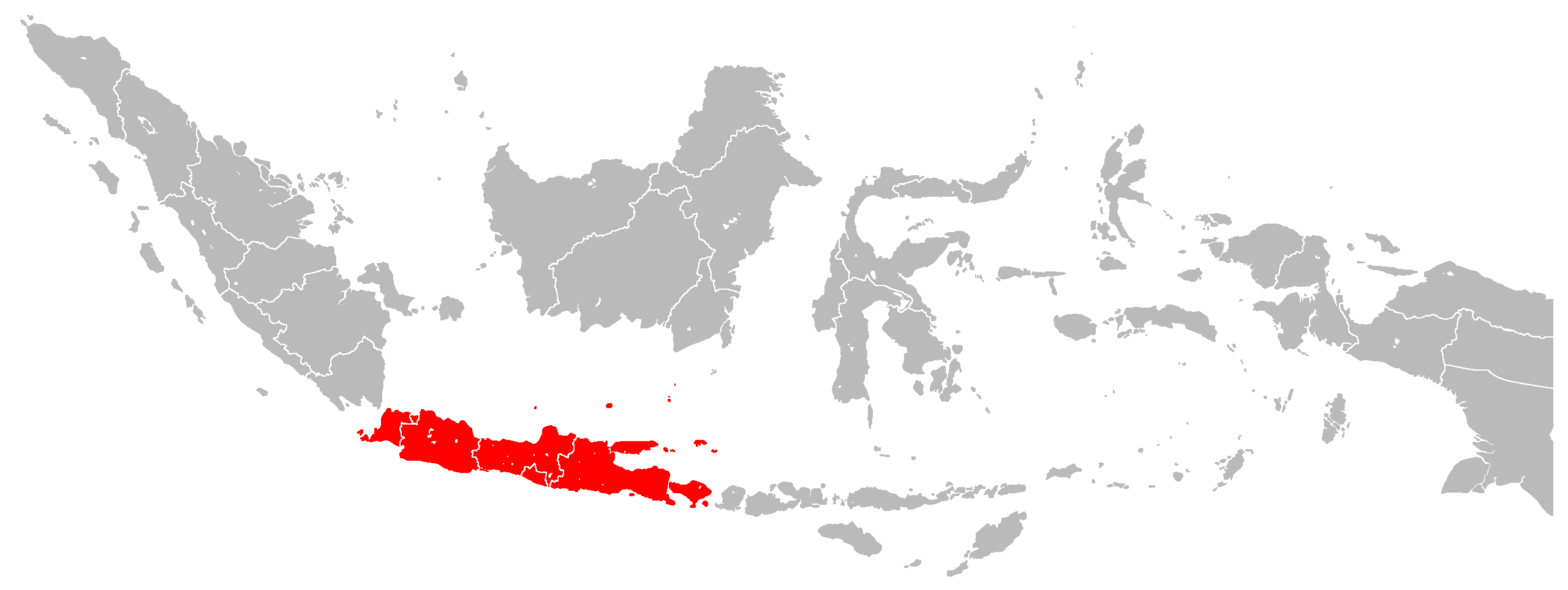
Provinces affected by the blackout. Not all areas within the political borders are affected.

The 2005 Java–Bali Blackout was a power outage across Java and Bali on 18 August 2005, affecting some 100 million people.

== Impact ==
Power went off at around 10:23 am (UTC+7) on 18 August 2005 across most areas of the two islands. Jakarta lost power completely, along with Banten and Special Region of Yogyakarta; there were blackouts in parts of Central Java, along with parts of both West Java and East Java. Power resumed in most areas of Jakarta at about 5:00 pm (UTC+7) on the same day.

== Cause ==
Prior to the blackout, the Jakarta area was importing about 21% of its power needs.

A transmission line between Cilegon and Saguling, both in West Java, failed at 10:23 am local time. The devices protecting the system misoperated, sending incorrect signals to Suralaya Power Station. This led to a cascading failure that shut down two units of the Paiton Power Station in East Java and six units at Suralaya in West Java.

PLN, the state-owned electricity company, confirmed that the electricity grid failed at several points throughout Java and the neighbouring island of Bali, causing a supply shortfall of 2,700 MW, roughly half of the original supply.

== Post-blackout ==
PLN apologised for the incident and said about 293,235 customers will be compensated. Meanwhile, President Susilo Bambang Yudhoyono ordered police and the national intelligence agency to assist PLN to trace the cause of the blackouts.

== See also ==
- List of power outages
