= Northeast blackout of 2003 =

Power outage in North America

- This image shows states and provinces that experienced power outages. Not all areas within these political boundaries were affected.
- Date: August 14–16, 2003
- Duration: 2 hours–4 days, depending on location
- Location: Michigan, Ohio, Pennsylvania, New Jersey, New York, Connecticut, Massachusetts, Ontario
- Type: Blackout
- Cause: Failure of alarm system in FirstEnergy control room leading to cascading loss of transmission and generation capability.
- Outcome: 55 million people affected
- Deaths: Almost 100

The Northeast blackout of 2003 was a widespread power outage throughout parts of the Northeastern and Midwestern United States, and most parts of the Canadian province of Ontario on Thursday, August 14, 2003, beginning just after 4:10 p.m. EDT.

Most places restored power by midnight (within 7 hours), some as early as 6 p.m. on August 14 (within 2 hours), while the New York City Subway resumed limited services around 8 p.m. Full power was restored to New York City and parts of Toronto on August 16. At the time, it was the world's second most widespread blackout in history, after the 1999 Southern Brazil blackout. The outage, which was much more widespread than the Northeast blackout of 1965, affected an estimated 55 million people, including 10 million people in southern and central Ontario and 45 million people in eight U.S. states.

The blackout was due to a software bug in the alarm system at the control room of FirstEnergy, which rendered operators unaware of the need to redistribute load after overloaded transmission lines dropped in voltage. What should have been a manageable local blackout cascaded into the collapse of much of the Northeast regional electricity distribution system.

== Immediate impact ==
According to the New York Independent System Operator (NYISO)—the ISO, responsible for managing the New York state power grid—a 3,500 megawatt power surge (towards Ontario) affected the transmission grid at 4:10:39 p.m. EDT.

For the next 30 minutes, until 4:40 p.m. EDT, outages were reported in parts of Michigan (Detroit), Ohio (Cleveland, Akron, Toledo), Ontario (Toronto, Hamilton, London, Windsor), New Jersey (Newark), and New York (New York City, Suffolk, Nassau, Westchester, Orange and Rockland counties, Rochester, Syracuse, Binghamton, Albany).

This was followed by outages in other areas initially unaffected, including all of New York City, portions of southern New York state, New Jersey, Vermont, Connecticut, as well as most of the province of Ontario. Eventually, a large, somewhat triangular area bounded by Lansing, Michigan, Sault Ste. Marie, Ontario, the shore of James Bay, Ottawa, New York, and Toledo was left without power.

According to the official analysis of the blackout prepared by the US and Canadian governments, more than 508 generating units at 265 power plants shut down during the outage. In the minutes before the event, the NYISO-managed power system was carrying 28,700 MW of load. At the height of the outage, the load had dropped to 5,716 MW, a loss of 80%.

Essential services remained in operation in some of these areas. In others, backup generation systems failed. Telephone networks generally remained operational, but the increased demand triggered by the blackout left some circuits overloaded. Water systems in several cities lost pressure, forcing boil-water advisories to be put into effect. Cellular service was interrupted as mobile networks were overloaded with the increase in volume of calls. Multiple cell sites were out of commission due to power outages. Television and radio stations remained on the air, with the help of backup generators, although some stations were knocked off the air for periods ranging from several hours to the length of the entire blackout.

High heat played a role in the initial event that triggered the wider power outage. Much of the affected region reached temperatures higher than 31 °C (88 °F) that day, increasing energy demand as people across the region turned on fans and air conditioning. This caused the power lines to sag as higher currents heated the lines.

Most of the Amtrak Northeast Corridor service was interrupted, as it relied on electricity for its signaling and crossing systems; electrified commuter railways also shut down. Via Rail in Canada was able to continue most of its service. All airports in the affected area closed immediately, there were no departures, and incoming flights had to be diverted to airports with power.

The reliability of the electrical grid was called into question and required substantial investment to repair its shortcomings.

In areas where power remained off after nightfall, the Milky Way and orbiting artificial satellites became visible to the naked eye in metropolitan areas where they cannot ordinarily be seen due to light pollution.

== Duration ==
Most places restored power by midnight, as early as 6 p.m. on August 14, and the New York City Subway had resumed limited services around 8 p.m. Some areas lost power for only four to eight hours; these are: Albany and parts of Long Island in New York; three‐quarters of New Jersey; parts of Pennsylvania, Ohio and Michigan; New London County, Connecticut; parts of downtown Toronto, Mississauga, and London in Ontario; portions of western Ottawa in Ontario, including Kanata and south to Kingston; a number of areas of the Regional Municipality of Niagara in Ontario; and parts of Southwestern Ontario, particularly areas near the Bruce Nuclear Generating Station.

By the next morning (August 15), some areas of Manhattan regained power around 5:00 a.m.; Staten Island regained power around 3:00 a.m. Half of the affected portions of Ontario regained power by the morning. By early evening of August 15, two airports, Cleveland Hopkins International Airport and Toronto Pearson International Airport, were back in service. By August 16, power was fully restored in New York and parts of Toronto. 500,000 Detroit Edison customers were still without power at 10:00pm August 15; all were restored by 6:30am August 16.

=== Unaffected regions ===
Within the area affected, about 200,000 people continued to have power—in the Niagara Peninsula of Ontario; the easternmost corner of Ontario (centered on Cornwall); northwestern Ontario (west of Wawa); and the Buffalo, New York area, excluding southern Erie county, along the shore of Lake Huron via a feeder line to Owen Sound from Bruce Nuclear Generating Station. Three of the four Bruce B units were able to throttle back their output without a complete shutdown, then reconnect to the grid within five hours: the portion of New York state including parts of Albany and north and west of Albany, a small pocket of mid-east Michigan, the Upper Peninsula of Michigan, and small pockets in New Jersey. The unaffected area was protected by transmission circuit devices at the Sir Adam Beck Hydroelectric Generating Stations in Niagara Falls (coincidentally, the starting point of the Northeast blackout of 1965) at a switching station of the hydroelectric power station in Cornwall, as well as central New York state. Philadelphia and the surrounding mid-Atlantic areas were also completely unaffected because PJM disconnected them. The Saint Clair power plant in East China Township, Michigan, remained online for about 36 hours, and residents were informed that the plant would have to shut down in order to facilitate the reboot of the whole system. Orrville, Ohio, was able to restore power within an hour disconnecting the local utility from the larger grid and restarting the coal-fired generator.

== Causes ==
=== Power grid management concepts ===
The load on any power network must be immediately matched by its supply and its ability to transmit that power. Any overload of a power line or generator can cause costly damage, so the affected device is disconnected from the network if an overload is detected.

The electrical resistance of a power line causes it to produce more heat as the current it carries increases. If this heat is not sufficiently dissipated, the metal conductor in the line will expand and lengthen, so that it sags between supporting structures. If the line sags too low, a flash over to nearby objects (such as trees) may occur, causing a transient increase in current. Automatic protective relays detect the excessively high current and quickly disconnect the line, so the load previously carried by the line is transferred to other lines. If the other lines do not have enough spare capacity to accommodate the extra current, their overload protection will react as well, causing a cascading failure.

System operators are responsible for ensuring that power supply and loads remain balanced, and for keeping the system within safe operational limits such that no single fault can cause the system to fail. After a failure affecting their system, operators must obtain more power from generators or other regions or "shed load" (meaning to intentionally cut power to a given area, similar to a rolling blackout) until they can be sure that the worst remaining possible failure anywhere in the system will not cause a system collapse. In an emergency, they are expected to immediately shed load as required to bring the system into balance.

To assist the operators there are computer systems, with backups, which issue alarms when there are faults in the transmission or generation system. Power flow modeling tools let them analyze the state of their network, predict whether any parts of it may be overloaded, and predict the worst possible failure remaining, so that they can change the distribution of generation or reconfigure the transmission system to prevent a failure should this situation occur. If the computer systems and their backups fail, the operators are required to monitor the grid manually, instead of relying on computer alerts. If they cannot interpret the state of the power grid in such an event, they follow a contingency plan, contacting other plant and grid operators by telephone if necessary. If there is a failure, they are also required to notify adjacent areas which may be affected, so those can predict the possible effects on their own systems.

=== Investigation efforts ===
A joint federal task force was formed by the governments of Canada and the U.S. to oversee the investigation and report directly to Ottawa and Washington. The task force was led by then-Canadian Natural Resources Minister Herb Dhaliwal and U.S. Energy Secretary Spencer Abraham.

In addition to determining the initial cause of the cascading failure, the investigation of the incident also included an examination of the failure of safeguards designed to prevent a repetition of the Northeast blackout of 1965. The North American Electric Reliability Corporation, a joint Canada-U.S. council, is responsible for dealing with these issues.

On November 19, 2003, Abraham said his department would not seek to punish FirstEnergy Corp for its role in the blackout because current U.S. law does not require electric reliability standards. Abraham stated, "The absence of enforceable reliability standards creates a situation in which there are limits in terms of federal level punishment."

=== Findings ===
In April 2004, the U.S.-Canada Power System Outage Task Force released their final report, placing the causes of the blackout into four groups:

1. FirstEnergy (FE) and its reliability council "failed to assess and understand the inadequacies of FE's system, particularly with respect to voltage instability and the vulnerability of the Cleveland-Akron area, and FE did not operate its system with appropriate voltage criteria."
2. FirstEnergy "did not recognize or understand the deteriorating condition of its system."
3. FirstEnergy "failed to manage adequately tree growth in its transmission rights-of-way."
4. Finally, the "failure of the interconnected grid's reliability organizations to provide effective real-time diagnostic support."

The report states that a generating plant in Eastlake, Ohio, a suburb northeast of Cleveland, went offline amid high electrical demand, putting a strain on high-voltage power lines (located in Walton Hills, Ohio, a southeast suburb of Cleveland) which later went out of service when they came in contact with "overgrown trees". This trip caused load to transfer to other transmission lines, which were not able to bear the load, tripping their breakers. Once these multiple trips occurred, a number of generators suddenly lost parts of their loads, so they accelerated out of phase with the grid at different rates, and tripped out to prevent damage. The cascading effect that resulted ultimately forced the shutdown of at least 265 power plants.

==== Computer failure ====
A software bug known as a race condition existed in General Electric Energy's Unix-based XA/21 energy management system. Once triggered, the bug stalled FirstEnergy's control room alarm system for over an hour. System operators were unaware of the malfunction. The failure deprived them of both audio and visual alerts for important changes in system state.

Unprocessed events queued up after the alarm system failure and the primary server failed within 30 minutes. Then all applications (including the stalled alarm system) were automatically transferred to the backup server, which itself failed at 14:54. The server failures slowed the screen refresh rate of the operators' computer consoles from 1–3 seconds to 59 seconds per screen. The lack of alarms led operators to dismiss a call from American Electric Power about the tripping and reclosure of a 345 kV shared line in northeast Ohio. But by 15:42, after the control room itself lost power, control room operators informed technical support (who were already troubleshooting the problem) of the alarm system problem.

=== Sequence of events ===
==== Outages in the Cleveland-Akron area ====
The cascading failure began in the FE-controlled Cleveland–Akron area; the area was significant because it was a "transmission-constrained load pocket with relatively limited generation." On August 14, a number of power generators in and around the area were offline. This reduced the available resources for voltage control and reactive power management in contingencies but did not affect normal operation. Four or five of the area's capacitor banks—also used to manage reactive power—were also offline for routine maintenance; this did not follow the best practice of performing such maintenance during low-demand periods, and their status was not reported for regional planning purposes because FE had deemed them to be non-critical infrastructure.

Incidents contributing to the blackout began after noon on August 14. FE's reliability coordinator was the Midwest Independent System Operator (MISO). MISO maintained a regularly updated model of its area of responsibility with a state estimator (SE). At 12:15 p.m., the SE was mistakenly shutdown after producing anomalous results due to old data. Unscheduled grid outages followed. In the Cleveland-Akron area, Eastlake Power Plant unit 5 went offline at 1:31 p.m. In Southern Ohio, Dayton Power and Light's (DPL) Stuart-Atlanta transmission line tripped from tree contact at 2:02 p.m. The outages did not affect normal operation. However, the loss of the Eastlake unit put the FE system at risk of overloads in certain contingency scenarios; FE did not notice the danger. At the time of the Eastlake unit outage, FE was asking for and receiving significant additional voltage support, but the situation was not unprecedented.

FE's situational awareness was reduced by the development of faults in its General Electric Harris XA21 energy management system (EMS) from 2:14 p.m. to 2:54 p.m. The alarm and logging software in the control room failed first, followed by some remote terminals and data links, then the primary and backup EMS servers. Control room operators were unaware of the alarm failure for over an hour. Operators began to suspect a failure after receiving a notification from American Electric Power (AEP) at 2:32 p.m. about a short AEP line outage that the FE EMS had failed to raise an alert for. FE IT was automatically notified of the remote terminal and server failures. IT performed a "warm reboot" of the primary server at 3:08 p.m. but did not realize that the alarm function remained broken. The control room notified IT of the alarm problem at 3:42 p.m. A "cold reboot"—later discovered to be the vendor-recommended action—was rejected because the power system situation was precarious and operators were concerned about the greater loss of functionality during the reboot procedure. The servers were offline again at 3:46 p.m. to 3:59 p.m. as they were rebooted in another attempt to re-enable the alarms. FE failed to notify MISO of its degraded situational awareness.

Cleveland-Akron area transmission lines began failing shortly after 3:00 p.m. Three 345 kV transmission lines failed between 3:05 p.m. to 3:42 p.m. due to tree contact. The first was the Harding-Chamberlin line. Most of the load from that line was transferred to the Hanna-Juniper line, which then failed at 3:32 p.m. PJM and AEP began mitigation efforts to prevent the Star-South Canton line connecting FE and AEP from overloading; they had incomplete data on the status of FE's system and underestimated the severity of the situation. The Star-South Canton line failed at 3:41 p.m. after its loading increased from 82% to 120% after the failure of the Hanna-Juniper line. The failures in the MISO SE and FE EMS prevented either from recognizing and responding to the failures. FE observed the loss of voltage after 3:32 p.m, but it was not until 3:45 p.m. that it recognized an emergency was occurring. Next, the 138 kV lines failed between 3:39 p.m. to 4:08 p.m. The loss of voltage shut down industrial equipment used by customers and blacked out Akron and its surroundings.

The MISO SE was reactivated at 2:40 p.m, but the results confused operators because the model did not match empirical data. The discrepancy was caused by the SE being unaware of the DPL line outage at 2:02 p.m; DPL's reliability coordinator was PJM, so DPL did not automatically report data to MISO. MISO operators had the SE modelling correctly again by 4:04 p.m. It was too late for MISO to address FE's critical status; the cascading failure started minutes later.

==== Timeline ====
The following is the blackout's sequence of events on August 14, 2003 (times in EDT):

- 12:15 p.m. Incorrect telemetry data renders the state estimator, a power flow monitoring tool operated by the Indiana-based Midwest Independent Transmission System Operator (MISO), inoperative. An operator corrects the telemetry problem, but forgets to restart the monitoring tool.
- 1:31 p.m. The Eastlake, Ohio generating plant shuts down. The plant is owned by FirstEnergy, an Akron, Ohio-based company.
- 2:02 p.m. The first of several 345 kV overhead transmission lines in northeast Ohio fails due to contact with a tree in Walton Hills, Ohio.41°21′22″N 81°34′10″W
- 2:14 p.m. An alarm system fails at FirstEnergy's control room and is not repaired.
- 3:05 p.m. A 345 kV transmission line known as the Chamberlin-Harding line sags into a tree and trips in Parma, south of Cleveland.
- 3:17 p.m. Voltage dips temporarily on the Ohio portion of the grid. Controllers take no action.
- 3:32 p.m. Power shifted by the first failure onto another 345 kV power line, the Hanna-Juniper interconnection, causes it to sag into a tree, bringing it offline as well. While MISO and FirstEnergy controllers concentrate on understanding the failures, they fail to inform system controllers in nearby states.
- 3:39 p.m. A FirstEnergy 138 kV line trips in northern Ohio.
- 3:41 p.m. A circuit breaker connecting FirstEnergy's grid with that of American Electric Power is tripped as a 345 kV power line (Star-South Canton interconnection) and fifteen 138 kV lines fail in rapid succession in northern Ohio.
- 3:46 p.m. A fifth 345 kV line, the Tidd-Canton Central line, trips offline.
- 4:05:57 p.m. The Sammis-Star 345 kV line trips due to under-voltage and over-current interpreted as a short circuit. (Later analysis suggests that the blackout could have been averted before this failure by cutting 1.5 GW of load in the Cleveland–Akron area.)
- 4:06–4:08 p.m. A sustained power surge north toward Cleveland overloads three 138 kV lines.
- 4:09:02 p.m. Voltage sags deeply as Ohio draws 2 GW of power from Michigan, creating simultaneous under-voltage and over-current conditions as power attempts to flow in such a way as to rebalance the system's voltage.
- 4:10:34 p.m. Multiple transmission lines trip out, first in Michigan and then in Ohio, blocking the eastward flow of power around the south shore of Lake Erie from Toledo, Ohio, east through Erie, Pennsylvania, and into southern Erie county, but not most of the Buffalo metropolitan area. Suddenly bereft of demand, generating stations go offline, creating a huge power deficit. In seconds, power surges in from the east, overloading east-coast power plants whose generators go offline as a protective measure, and the main event blackout begins.
- 4:10:37 p.m. The eastern and western Michigan power grids disconnect from each other. Two 345 kV lines in Michigan trip. A line that runs from Grand Ledge to Ann Arbor known as the Oneida-Majestic interconnection trips. A short time later, a line running from Bay City south to Flint in Consumers Energy's system known as the Hampton-Thetford line also trips.
- 4:10:38 p.m. Cleveland separates from the Pennsylvania grid.
- 4:10:39 p.m. 3.7 GW power flows from the east along the north shore of Lake Erie, through Ontario to southern Michigan and northern Ohio, a flow more than ten times greater than the condition 30 seconds earlier, causing a voltage drop across the system.
- 4:10:40 p.m. Flow flips to 2 GW eastward from Michigan through Ontario (a net reversal of 5.7 GW of power), then reverses back westward again within a half second.
- 4:10:43 p.m. International connections between the United States and Canada start to fail.
- 4:10:45 p.m. Northwestern Ontario separates from the east when the Wawa-Marathon 230 kV line north of Lake Superior disconnects. The first Ontario power plants go offline in response to the unstable voltage and current demand on the system.
- 4:10:46 p.m. The New England grid separates from New York, to stop the black out from entering New England.
- 4:10:50 p.m. Ontario separates from the western New York grid.
- 4:11:57 p.m. The Keith-Waterman, Bunce Creek-Scott 230 kV lines and the St. Clair–Lambton #1 230 kV line and #2 345 kV line between Michigan and Ontario fail.
- 4:12:03 p.m. Windsor, Ontario, and surrounding areas drop off the grid.
- 4:12:58 p.m. Northern New Jersey separates its power-grids from New York and the Philadelphia area, causing a cascade of failing secondary generator plants along the New Jersey coast and throughout the inland regions west.
- 4:13 p.m. End of cascading failure. 256 power plants are off-line, 85% of which went offline after the grid separations occurred, most due to the action of automatic protective controls.

== Effects ==
Major cities affected
City	Number of people affected
New York City and surrounding areas	14,300,000
Toronto metropolitan area and surrounding areas	8,300,000
Newark, New Jersey, and surrounding areas	6,980,000
Detroit and surrounding areas	6,400,000
Cleveland and surrounding areas	2,900,000
Ottawa	780,000 of 1,120,000*
Buffalo, New York, and surrounding areas	1,100,000
Rochester, New York	1,050,000
London, Ontario, and surrounding areas	475,000
Kitchener-Cambridge-Waterloo, and surrounding areas	415,000
Toledo, Ohio	310,000
Windsor, Ontario	208,000
Estimated total	55,000,000

*Ottawa-Gatineau is a special case in that it is divided by a provincial boundary and the Ontario and Quebec grids are not synchronously connected. This resulted in Gatineau having power while Ottawa did not. Locals may have witnessed the drastic cutoff when they were crossing the Portage Bridge which links the capital region (street lights on the bridge were still lit on the Quebec side of the structure).

=== Affected infrastructure ===
==== Power generation ====
With the power fluctuations on the grid, power plants automatically went into "safe mode" to prevent damage in the case of an overload. This put much of the nuclear power offline until those plants could be slowly taken out of "safe mode". In the meantime, all available hydro-electric plants (as well as a number of coal- and oil-fired plants) were brought online, bringing some electrical power to the areas immediately surrounding the plants by the morning of August 15. Homes and businesses both in the affected area and in nearby areas were requested to limit power usage until the grid was back to full power.

==== Water supply ====
Some areas lost water pressure because pumps lacked power. This loss of pressure caused potential contamination of the water supply. Four million customers of the Detroit water system in eight counties were under a boil-water advisory until August 18, four days after the initial outage. One county, Macomb, ordered all 2,300 restaurants closed until they were decontaminated after the advisory was lifted. Twenty people living on the St. Clair River claim to have been sickened after bathing in the river during the blackout. The accidental release of 140 kg (310 lb) of vinyl chloride from a Sarnia, Ontario chemical plant was not revealed until five days later. Cleveland also lost water pressure and instituted a boil water advisory. Cleveland and New York had sewage spills into waterways, requiring beach closures. Newark, New Jersey, and northern cities had major sewage spills into the Passaic and Hackensack rivers, which flow directly to the Atlantic Ocean. Kingston, Ontario lost power to sewage pumps, causing raw waste to be dumped into the Cataraqui River at the base of the Rideau Canal.

==== Transportation ====
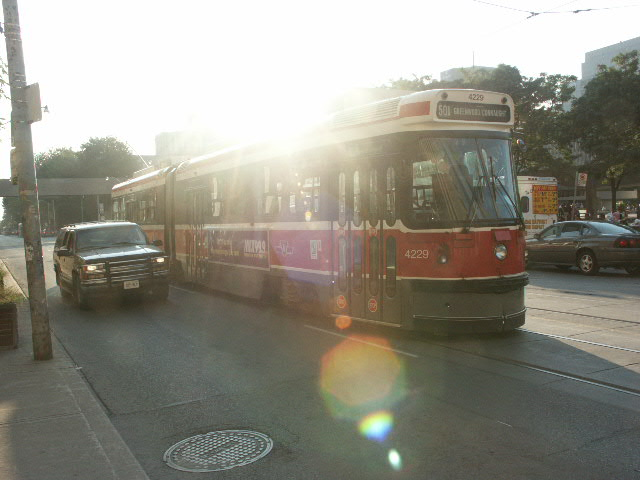
A streetcar left stranded by the blackout in Toronto

Amtrak's Northeast Corridor railroad service was stopped north of Philadelphia, and all trains running into and out of New York City were shut down, initially including the Long Island Rail Road and the Metro-North Railroad; both were able to establish a bare-bones "all-diesel" service by the next morning. Canada's Via Rail, which serves Toronto and Montreal, had a few service delays before returning to normal the next morning.

Passenger screenings at affected airports ceased. Regional airports were shut down for this reason. In New York, flights were cancelled even after power had been restored to the airports because of difficulties accessing "electronic-ticket" information. Air Canada flights remained grounded on the morning of August 15 due to reliable power not having been restored to its Mississauga control center. It expected to resume operations by midday. This problem affected all Air Canada service and canceled the most heavily traveled flights to Halifax and Vancouver. At Chicago's Midway International Airport, Southwest Airlines employees spent 48 hours dealing with the disorder caused by the blackout's sudden incidence.

Many gas stations were unable to pump fuel due to lack of electricity. In North Bay, Ontario, for instance, a long line of transport trucks was held up, unable to go further west to Manitoba without refueling. In some cities, traffic problems were compounded by motorists who simply drove until their cars ran out of gas on the highway. Gas stations operating in pockets of Burlington, Ontario, that had power were reported to be charging prices up to $3.78 per US gallon (99.9 ¢/Litre) when the going rate prior to the blackout was lower than $2.65/gallon (70¢/L). Customers still lined up for hours to pay prices many people considered price gouging. Station operators claimed that they had a limited supply of gasoline and did not know when their tanks would be refilled, prompting the drastic price increases.

Many oil refineries on the East Coast of the United States shut down as a result of the blackout, and were slow to resume gasoline production. As a result, gasoline prices were expected to rise approximately 10 cents/gallon (3¢/L) in the United States. In Canada, gasoline rationing was also considered by the authorities.

==== Communication ====
Cellular communication devices were disrupted. This was mainly due to the loss of backup power at the cellular sites where generators ran out of fuel. Where cell sites remained up, some cell phones still went out of service as their batteries ran out of charge without a power source to recharge from. Wired telephone lines continued to work, although some systems were overwhelmed by the volume of traffic, and millions of home users had only cordless telephones depending on house current. Most New York and multiple Ontario radio stations were momentarily knocked off the air before returning with backup power.

Cable television systems were disabled, and in areas that had power restored (and had power to their television sets), cable subscribers could not receive information until power was restored to the cable provider. Those who relied on the Internet were similarly disconnected from their news source for the duration of the blackout, with the exception of dial-up access from laptop computers, which were widely reported to work until the batteries ran out of charge. Information was available by over-the-air TV and radio reception for those who were equipped to receive TV and/or audio in that way.

The blackout affected communications well outside the immediate area of power outage. The New Jersey–based internet operations of Advance Publications were among those knocked out by the blackout. As a result, the internet editions of Advance newspapers as far removed from the blackout area as The Birmingham News, the New Orleans Times-Picayune, and The Oregonian were offline for days.

Amateur radio operators passed emergency communications during the blackout.

==== Industry ====
Large numbers of factories were closed in the affected area, and others outside the area were forced to close or slow work because of supply problems and the need to conserve energy while the grid was being stabilized. At one point a 7-hour wait developed for trucks crossing the Ambassador Bridge between Detroit and Windsor due to the lack of electronic border check systems. Freeway congestion in affected areas affected the "just in time" (JIT) supply system. Some industries (including the auto industry) did not return to full production until August 22.

=== By region ===
==== New York ====
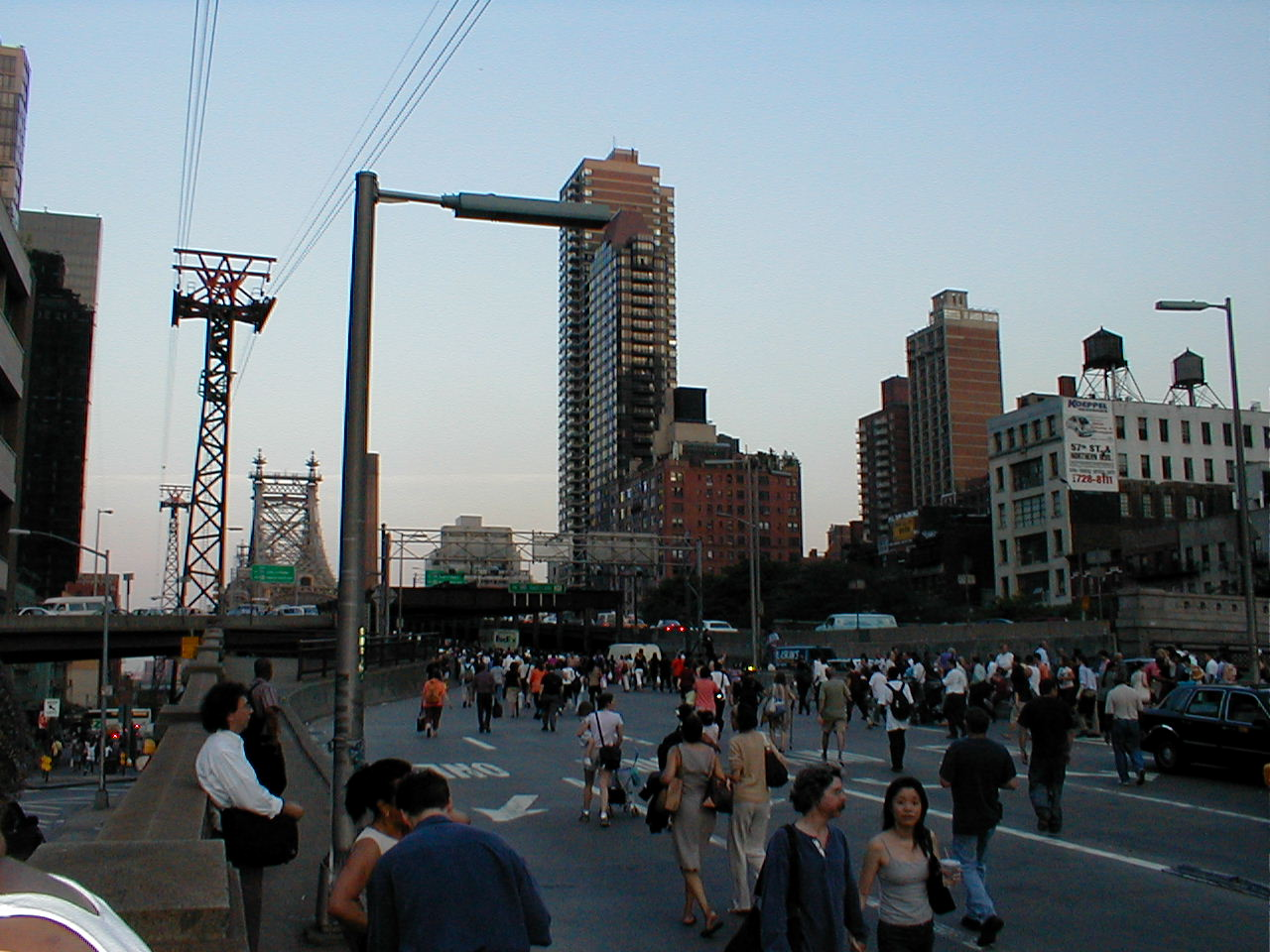
People walking across the Queensboro Bridge in New York City during the blackout

Almost the entirety of the State of New York lost power. Exceptions included Freeport and Rockville Centre on Long Island, which relied on localized power plants; the Capital District, where power dipped briefly (a few areas, such as portions of Latham, New York, did not lose power at all); the southernmost areas of the Southern Tier of Upstate New York, mostly near Waverly, which relied on power from Pennsylvania; the city of Plattsburgh; Starrett City, Brooklyn, which has auxiliary power; most of the city of Buffalo; and pockets of Amherst in the Buffalo area, running off university power. There were also some small pockets of power in the suburbs of Rochester, as a few smaller power companies operating in those areas were able to keep running. The North Shore Towers complex was unaffected by the blackout due to their on-site self-generating power plant. Power was also available at the Kodak Park facility and its surrounding neighborhood in the city. Power was lost at the Oak Hill Country Club in nearby Pittsford, where the 2003 PGA Championship was being played, which caused minor interruptions to the tournament. Also, that evening's Major League Baseball game between the New York Mets and the San Francisco Giants at Shea Stadium was postponed. In New York, all prisons were blacked out and switched to generator power. The two Indian Point nuclear reactors on the Hudson River near Peekskill, the two reactors at Nine Mile Point nuclear plant, the single reactor at Ginna nuclear plant near Rochester, and the FitzPatrick reactor near Oswego all shut down. With three other nuclear plants shut down in Ohio, Michigan, and New Jersey, a total of nine reactors were affected. The governor of New York, George Pataki, declared a state of emergency.

Verizon's emergency generators failed several times, leaving the emergency services number 9-1-1 out of service for several periods of about a quarter-hour each. New York City's 3-1-1 information hotline received over 175,000 calls from concerned residents during the weekend. Amateur radio operators attached to New York City ARES provided a backup communications link to emergency shelters and hospitals. Amateur radio repeaters were supplied with emergency power via generators and batteries and remained functional.

Major U.S. networks (CBS, NBC, ABC and Fox) and some cable television channels (HBO, MTV and Nickelodeon), centered in New York City, were unable to broadcast normally, so backup stations and flagship transmitters in Dallas were used for prime-time TV. ABC ran their news broadcasts from Washington, D.C. instead.

===== New York City =====
Much of Manhattan, including the headquarters of the United Nations, was rendered without power, as were all area airports (with the exception of Newburgh's Stewart International Airport, which had once been a military airbase and had its own generators). All New York-area rail transportation including the subway, the PATH lines between Manhattan and New Jersey, NJ Transit Rail Operations, Metro-North, and the Long Island Rail Road, were without power. Limited railroad service resumed early Friday morning through the use of diesel trains.

More than 600 subway and commuter rail cars were trapped between stations. New York's Metropolitan Transportation Authority (which operates the subway) and the Port Authority of New York and New Jersey (which operates the PATH lines) reported that all passengers were evacuated without serious injury. PATH resumed service on the Uptown Hudson Tubes by 9:45 p.m. that evening; system-wide service resumed at 11 p.m. By comparison, full service on the New York City Subway system returned gradually from Friday through Saturday morning.

Without traffic lights, gridlock was reported as people in Lower and Midtown Manhattan fled their offices on foot. For hours into the evening, the streets, highways, bridges and tunnels were jammed with traffic and pedestrians leaving Manhattan. A number of civilians helped direct traffic. The normally four-hour bus journey from Manhattan to Washington, D.C. took more than eight hours. According to reports, it took four hours just to get out of Manhattan.

Hundreds of people found themselves trapped in elevators at the start of the blackout, requiring urgent response from the FDNY. By late evening, the New York City Fire Department had reportedly confirmed that all stalled elevators in approximately 800 Manhattan high-rise office and apartment buildings had been cleared.

Mayor Michael Bloomberg advised residents to open their windows, drink plenty of liquids to avoid heat stroke, and not to forget their pets. Temperatures were 92 °F (33 °C) with high humidity, as New York had just experienced a record-breaking rain spell that had started at the end of July. With cell phone operation mostly stalled by circuit overloads, New Yorkers were lining up 10 deep or more at pay phones as ordinary telephone service remained largely unaffected. A number of people found themselves with no phone service at home.

While some commuters were able to find alternate sleeping arrangements, a number of people were left stranded in New York and slept in parks and on the steps of public buildings. While practically all businesses and retail establishments closed down, multiple bars and pubs reported a brisk business as New Yorkers took the opportunity to spend the evening "enjoying" the blackout. Tourists' hotel rooms were blacked out, except the hallways, and most of the restaurants in lobbies gave out free food to guests. Since most perishable items were going to spoil anyway, restaurants and citizens simply prepared what they could and served it to anyone who wanted it, leading to vast block parties in multiple New York City neighborhoods. Any ice cream in frozen storage also had to be quickly served to any and all passers by.

The Indigo Girls were scheduled to perform that evening at Central Park SummerStage, and the band took the stage as planned to play one of the only shows in the affected area, using generators that had been filled with fuel that morning. Their performance was not a full-length concert, as they needed to end early to allow all attendees to exit Central Park before dark. The venue also had bathrooms, and vendors cooking food on propane grills.

Forty thousand police officers and the entire fire department were called in to maintain order. At least two fatalities were linked to the use of flames to provide light, and a number of non-fatal fires also resulted from the use of candles. New York City's Office of Emergency Management activated its Emergency Operations Center, from which more than 70 agencies coordinated response efforts, which included delivery of portable light towers to unlit intersections, generators and diesel fuel to hospitals, and a portable steam generator necessary to power air conditioning units at the American Stock Exchange.

==== New Jersey ====
Affected areas included most of Hudson, Morris, Essex, Union, Passaic, and Bergen counties, including the major cities of Newark, Jersey City and Paterson, although some sections of Newark and East Orange still had power. Small sections of certain towns in Essex, Hudson, and Union counties had power, as did the entire towns of Butler, Kinnelon and Bloomingdale in Morris and Passaic counties which were served by the Butler Electric Company (these 3 towns were also unaffected by the major blackouts of 1965 and 1977).

Power was returned first to the urban areas because of concerns of safety and unrest. Counties as far south as Cumberland were affected, where power was restored within an hour. Some towns in Bergen County only momentarily lost power, and had wild oscillations in power line voltage, ranging from about 90 V to 135 V every few minutes for an hour.

The day following the blackout, August 15, the New Jersey Turnpike stopped collecting tolls until 9:00 a.m.

==== Connecticut ====
Parts of New London, Hartford, New Haven, Litchfield, and Fairfield counties, from Greenwich to Danbury and Bridgeport were affected, although most of the state had power all evening, aside from a few momentary interruptions that caused computers to reboot. Metro-North trains stopped and remained on the tracks for hours, until they could be towed to the nearest station. Generally, most of the state east of Interstate 91, and some places west of I-91, had power during the duration of the blackout, with some of New Haven's eastern suburbs being seen as the easternmost extreme of the effects of the blackout.

A local controversy ensued in the days after the blackout, when the federal government ordered power companies to energize the HVDC Cross Sound Cable between New Haven and Long Island. This cable had been installed, but not activated due to environment and fishery concerns. The Attorney General of Connecticut (and future U.S. Senator), Richard Blumenthal, and the Governor of New York, George Pataki, traded insults over the cable. Connecticut politicians, without regard for public safety, expressed their outrage that the cable was being turned on, since it did not help anyone in Connecticut, as the cable would transport power from Connecticut to Long Island.

==== Massachusetts ====
A small area of western Massachusetts was affected. In Worcester the event was of sufficient magnitude to reboot some computers, while in Springfield the effect of the event was enough to cause the automatic startup of commercial and industrial backup generation facilities. Some areas were subjected to lower-than-normal voltage (as low as 100 volts AC) and brownouts for periods of up to 24 hours. The Boston area was spared from the blackout.

==== Michigan ====
About 2.3 million households and businesses were affected, including almost all of Metro Detroit, Lansing, Ann Arbor, and surrounding communities in southeast Michigan. The blackout affected three Michigan utilities: Detroit Edison (whose entire system went down), Lansing Board of Water & Light, and a small portion of Consumers Energy's system in the southeastern corner of the state.

Word quickly spread to the surrounding areas without power and people flocked to surrounding areas that still had power, resulting in crowded stores, packed restaurants, booked hotels, and long queues for the gas stations in these towns. Locales closest to the affected areas in the northern Detroit suburbs that did not lose power included the areas of Oxford and Holly, communities along M-24 and M-15, and into the Lapeer and Flint/Tri-Cities area. The city limits of Brighton and Howell were unaffected as well, as they received electricity from Consumers Energy via the Genoa-Latson 138 kV line which interconnects Detroit Edison and Consumers Energy.

Television and radio stations were temporarily knocked off the air and water supplies were disrupted in Detroit due to the failure of electric pumps. Because of the loss of water pressure, all water was required to be boiled before use until August 18. Several schools, which had planned to begin the school year August 18, were closed until clean water was available. A planned August 15 concert at Comerica Park featuring Kiss and Aerosmith was postponed until September 7.

A Marathon Oil refinery in Melvindale, near Detroit, suffered a small explosion from gas buildup, necessitating an evacuation within one mile (1.6 km) around the plant and the closure of Interstate 75.

Officials feared the release of toxic gases. Heavy rains on August 17, coupled with the lack of sewage pumps, closed other expressways and prompted urban flood warnings. Untreated sewage flowed into local rivers in Lansing and Metropolitan Detroit as contingency solutions at some sewage treatment plants failed.

In the midst of a summer heat wave, Michiganders were deprived of air conditioning. Several people, mostly elderly individuals, had to be treated for symptoms of heat stroke.

In the Detroit area, local television stations' news helicopters were told by each station's management to "stay above the cars' headlights" at night, and to not venture into Downtown Detroit (due to the hazard of flying into an unlit skyscraper). During the days immediately after the blackout, a number of TV stations were back on the air, with limited resources. In one case, WXYZ-TV's news anchor was wearing a T-shirt and shorts, as opposed to his normal news suit, and apologized to viewers for the "rather warm conditions" in the station, as they only had one air conditioner and a couple of fans working.

The Downriver communities had to contend with basements flooded with sewage-laden water on the weekend immediately after the blackout due to water and sewage pumps offline from a lack of power, much to the general annoyance of residents in the areas. News crews of the areas broadcast notices during their coverages of the blackouts to the Downriver residents, explaining why the pumps had shorted out, as well as to limit water usage. "Most places have water pressure, some have low pressure...some have none, and some even have negative pressure. That means in the next few hours, people in the downriver communities should expect flooded basements from, so move all your valuables high up and out of the basements," as WDIV-TV warned.

West Michigan, including the communities of Grand Rapids, Muskegon, and Holland were mostly unaffected, although a large portion was within "seconds" of joining the blackout according to local U.S. Representative Fred Upton. Some communities in Southwest Michigan were impacted, being among the most western locations impacted. Although right across the border from Sault Ste. Marie, Ontario, Sault Ste. Marie, Michigan was unaffected by the outage, as the two cities are not electrically connected.

==== Ohio ====
Over 540,000 homes and businesses were without power. In Cleveland, water service stopped because the city is supplied by electric pumps and backup electricity was available only on a limited basis. Water had to be boiled for several days afterwards.

Portions of the cities of Akron, Mansfield, Massillon, Marion, and Ashland were without power.

Cleveland declared a curfew on all persons under the age of 18. At Cedar Point amusement park in Sandusky, park employees had to help guests walk down the steps of the 205-foot-tall (62 m) Magnum XL-200 roller coaster, which had stopped on the lift hill due to the blackout. Several other guests had to be helped off rides as a result of the blackout. In Toledo, the Mud Hens baseball team postponed the game scheduled for that night. Some parts of the city were unaffected by the blackout, notably the suburb of Sylvania. Other surrounding cities like Bowling Green only experienced a brief outage.

==== Ontario ====
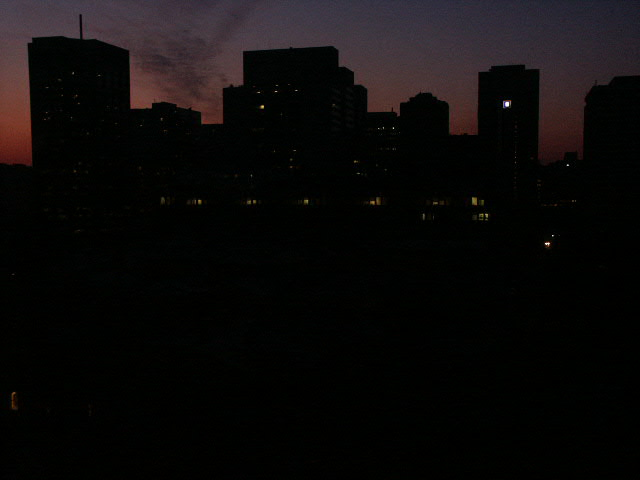
Toronto, on the evening of 14 August 2003

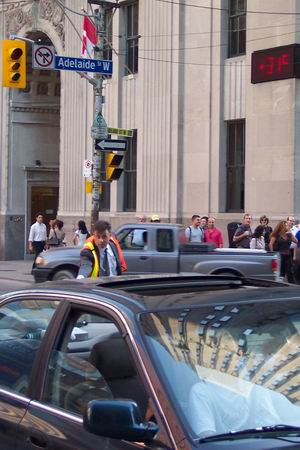
Volunteers, like Toronto lawyer Peter Carayiannis (pictured), received fluorescent jackets from the police to direct traffic in Toronto during the blackout. Traffic lights also went out of service.

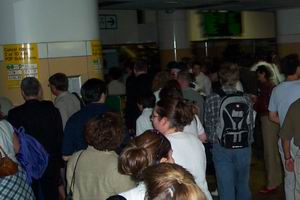
Toronto Union Station during the blackout

The area affected by the blackout included all Southern Ontario, except Grimsby, Pelham, Niagara Falls and Fort Erie, from Windsor to Ottawa and all the way to the Quebec border, except for the Cornwall area. Also affected was Northern Ontario, as far north as Attawapiskat and Moosonee on James Bay and west to Marathon on the Lake Superior shoreline. Communities affected in northern Ontario included Timmins, Cochrane, Sudbury, Kirkland Lake, North Bay, Wawa, and Sault Ste. Marie. Most of Northwestern Ontario (including Thunder Bay) was not affected.

Traffic lights, which had no backup power, were all knocked out. All intersections were to be considered an all-way stop. Coupled with the beginning of the evening rush hour, this caused traffic problems. In multiple major and minor intersections in large cities, such as Ottawa and Toronto, ordinary citizens began directing traffic until police or others relieved them. Since there were not enough police officers to direct traffic at every intersection during the afternoon rush hour, passing police officers distributed fluorescent jackets to civilians who were directing traffic. Drivers and pedestrians generally followed the instructions from them, even though they were not police officers.

In Ottawa, the federal government was shut down. The Parliamentary Precinct and Parliament Hill were evacuated.

In Toronto, the Toronto subway and RT and the Toronto streetcar system were shut down. Passengers had to be evacuated from subway trains by walking through the tunnels. Major Toronto hospitals reported that they had switched to generators and did not experience problems. The 9-1-1 system was operational. The streetcars remained suspended on August 18 and 19, resuming after assurances they would be exempt from any potential rotating blackouts.

Toronto officials asked residents to curtail unnecessary use of water, as pumps were not working and there was only a 24-hour supply. Entertainment events were canceled for several days. English band Radiohead rescheduled a planned August 16 concert in Toronto until the following October 15 due to the power outage. The opening of the Canadian National Exhibition, scheduled for August 15, was postponed to August 19. The roof of the Skydome in Toronto remained open in an effort to conserve power until August 21, when a thunderstorm struck.

Large disruptions of truck traffic in northeastern Ontario were reported due to the unavailability of fuel, including the backlog near North Bay. The tunnel and bridge between Windsor and Detroit were also closed, with the bridge's pillars illuminated by emergency floodlights, as to not pose a shipping and airplane hazard.

About 140 miners were marooned underground in the Falconbridge mine in Sudbury when the power went out. Mine officials said they were safe and could be evacuated if necessary, but were not, due to the risks of doing so with no power. They were safely evacuated by the morning. In Sarnia, a refinery scrubber lost power and released above-normal levels of pollution; residents were advised to close their windows.

On the evening of August 14, Ontario premier Ernie Eves declared a state of emergency, instructing nonessential personnel not to go to work the next day and that rolling blackouts could occur for weeks. Residents were asked not to use televisions, washing machines, or air conditioners if possible, and warned that some restored power might go off again. Although the full state of emergency was lifted the next day, residents were warned that the normal amount of power would not be available for days, and were still asked to reduce power consumption.

For two days of this recovery period, diversion of water from the Niagara River for hydroelectric generation was increased to the maximum level, normally used only at night and in winter in order to maintain the scenic appearance of Niagara Falls. The resultant drop in the river level below the falls meant that the Maid of the Mist tour boats could not dock safely, and their operation had to be suspended.

The Petro-Canada refinery in Oakville had to perform an emergency shutdown due to the lack of power. The plant's flare system produced large flames during the shutdown, leading to erroneous reports in the media that there had been a fire in the plant. The Petro Canada lubricants plant in Mississauga experienced a fire one week later while restarting normal operations.

==== Pennsylvania ====
The blackout was confined to the northwest portion of the state. The state's most populated metros of Philadelphia and Pittsburgh were unaffected. According to emergency officials in Erie, Crawford, Venango, Clarion, Bradford, Forest and Warren counties, outages lasted into the night, but there were no serious injuries or incidents.

== Emergency services ==
In New York, about 3,000 fire calls were reported, a number of them from people using candles. Emergency services responded to 80,000 calls for help, more than double the average.

From 4 p.m. of August 14 to midnight of August 15, there were 60 all-hands or greater alarm fires, caused mostly by candles. The FDNY answered over 7,500 calls which resulted in the transmission of over 4,000 alarms.

=== Fatalities ===
The blackout contributed to almost 100 deaths.

- In Ontario, a cyclist was hit by a car in Guelph and a father of two was hit by a car in his front yard west of Ottawa. Lewis Wheelan, a North York burn victim and a young man injured in an electrical accident in 2001, was found dead in his apartment when his air conditioning unit failed to keep his skin grafts adequately cooled, since his sweat glands were destroyed by his prior electrical injury.
- In Connecticut, one death was reported.
- In New York City, six deaths were reported: Two from carbon monoxide, two from fire, one from a fall off a roof while breaking into a shoe store, and one from a heart attack after climbing stairs.
- In the Detroit suburb of Harper Woods, WXYZ-TV news reported a man died from carbon monoxide poisoning after using a generator in his house.
- In Pittsfield Township, Michigan, a 27-year-old Belleville man died in a fire that destroyed the mobile home he was sleeping in, according to The Ann Arbor News. Officials said the fire was apparently caused by candles left burning.

== Long-term effects ==
The blackout prompted the federal government of the United States to include reliability provisions in the Energy Policy Act of 2005. The standards of the North American Electric Reliability Corporation became mandatory for U.S. electricity providers.

In the United States, the Bush administration had emphasized the need for changes to the U.S. national energy policy, critical infrastructure protection, and homeland security. During the blackout, most systems that would detect unauthorized border crossings, port landings, or detect unauthorized access to a number of vulnerable sites failed. There was considerable fear that future blackouts would be exploited for terrorism. In addition, the failure highlighted the ease with which the power grid could be taken down.

The Ontario government fell in a provincial election held in October 2003; power had long been a major issue. The government may have been hurt by the success of Quebec and Manitoba, which were not affected whereas Ontario was shut down. The extra publicity given to Ontario's need to import electricity from the United States, mostly due to a decision of the government not to expand the province's power generating capabilities, may also have adversely affected the Conservative government. Premier Ernie Eves's handling of the crisis was also criticized; he was not heard from until long after Mayor Bloomberg and Governor Pataki had spoken out. Due to the regular announcements he gave in the days following the blackout, Eves enjoyed a moderate increase in the polls that his party took as a sign of an opportunity to call an election they could win, but they lost instead.

== Restoration of service ==
By evening of August 14, power had been restored to:

- Many areas of Ontario
- Parts of New Jersey, Pennsylvania, Ohio and Michigan
- Parts of New York, including Long Island

Con Edison retracted its claim that New York City would have power by 1 a.m. That night some areas of Manhattan regained power at approximately 5 a.m. (August 15), the New York City borough of Staten Island regained power around 3 a.m. on August 15, and Niagara Mohawk predicted that the Niagara Falls area would have to wait until 8 a.m. In the New York City borough of Brooklyn power was not fully restored until around sunset on August 15.

By early evening of August 15, two airports, Cleveland Hopkins International Airport and Toronto Pearson International Airport, were back in service.

Half of the affected part of Ontario had power by the morning of August 15, though even in areas where it had come back online, some services were still disrupted or running at lower levels. The last areas to regain power were usually suffering from trouble at local electrical substations that was not directly related to the blackout itself.

By August 16, power was fully restored in New York and Toronto. Toronto's subway and streetcars remained out of service until August 18 to prevent the possibility of equipment being stuck in awkward locations if the power was interrupted again. Power had been mostly restored in Ottawa, though authorities warned of possible additional disruptions and advised conservation as power continued to be restored to other areas. Ontarians were asked to reduce their electricity use by 50% until all generating stations could be brought back on line. Four remained out of service on the 19th. Illuminated billboards were largely dormant for the week following the blackout, and multiple stores had only a portion of their lights on.

Preparations against the possible disruptions threatened by the Year 2000 problem have been credited for the installation of new electrical equipment and systems which allowed for a relatively rapid restoration of power in some areas.

== Media coverage and official reports ==
In the United States and Canada, the regional blackout dominated news broadcasts and news headlines beginning August 15. U.S. and Canadian television networks pre-empted normal programming in favor of full-time, advertising-free coverage of the unfolding story. Once terrorism had been conclusively ruled out as a cause, multiple stations switched back to normal programming following an 8:30 p.m. EDT address by President George W. Bush. National news stations, such as the CBC and CNN, continued to cover the story by inviting politicians and electrical experts to discuss the situation and suggest ways to prevent blackouts. Internationally, coverage of the story focused on the development of the situation in the New York City metropolitan area.

=== Statements made in the aftermath ===
During the first two hours of the event, various officials offered speculative explanations as to its root cause:

- Official reports from the office of Canadian Prime Minister Jean Chrétien stated that lightning had struck a power plant in northern New York, resulting in a cascading failure of the surrounding power grid and wide-area electric power transmission grid, resulted in the outage. (A lightning strike to a power substation north of New York City was similarly blamed for the 1977 blackout that plunged nearly the entire city into darkness for 24 hours.) New York state power officials replied that the problem did not originate in the United States, there was no rain storm in the area where the lightning allegedly stuck, and the power plant in question remained in operation throughout the blackout.
- Canadian Defence Minister John McCallum blamed an outage at a nuclear plant in Pennsylvania, where state officials reported all plants were functioning normally. McCallum later said his sources had given him incorrect information.
- New York governor George Pataki blamed the power outage on Canada, stating, "the New York independent systems operator says they are virtually certain it had nothing to do in New York state. And they believe it occurred west of Ontario, cascaded from there into Ontario, Canada, and through the Northeast." This was later proven to be false.
- CNN cited unnamed officials as saying that the Niagara-Mohawk power grid, which provides power for large portions of New York and parts of Canada, was overloaded. Between 4:10 and 4:13 p.m. EDT, 21 power stations throughout that grid shut down.
- New Mexico governor Bill Richardson, who formerly headed the Department of Energy, in a live television interview two hours into the blackout characterized the United States as "a superpower with a third-world electricity grid." In Europe, this statement was published accompanied with comparisons highlighting the tighter, safer and better interconnected European electricity network (though Italy would suffer a similar blackout six weeks later).
- In the ensuing days, critics focused on the role of electricity market deregulation for the inadequate state of the electric power transmission grid, claiming that deregulation laws and electricity market mechanisms had failed to provide market participants with sufficient incentives to construct new transmission lines and maintain system security.
- Later that night, claims surfaced that the blackout may have started in Ohio up to one hour before the network shut down, a claim denied by Ohio's FirstEnergy utility.
- The president of the North American Electric Reliability Corporation said that the problem originated in Ohio.
- By the morning of August 18, investigators believed that the problem began with a sudden shift in the direction of power flow on the northern portion of the Lake Erie Transmission Loop, a system of transmission lines that circles Lake Erie on both U.S. and Canadian soil.

== Voluntary Blackout Day commemorations ==
In Ontario, some cities took part in power conservation challenges or events to remind citizens of the blackout, the most well-known event being the Voluntary Blackout Day hosted by the Ontario Power Authority (OPA). During these events, citizens were encouraged to maximize their energy conservation activities. Smaller cities such as London, Guelph, Woodstock and Waterloo took part in the challenges annually. The final Voluntary Blackout Day was held on August 14, 2010, with OPA moving to more year-round energy conservation efforts.

In Toronto, an annual blackout anniversary party has been held on August 14 since 2006. The event takes place at a different downtown location each year and typically features a parade, bike rave, fire performances, live music, bonfires, and cookouts. In 2024, attendance was estimated at 1,500 to 2,000 people.

== See also ==
- Brittle Power
- List of major power outages
- Northeast blackout of 1965
- New York City blackout of 1977
- 2003 Italy blackout
- 2011 Southwest blackout
- Manhattan blackout of July 2019
- 2019 Java blackout
- 2012 India blackouts
- 2025 Iberian Peninsula blackout
- 2026 Sumatra blackout

== Sources ==
- U.S.-Canada Power System Outage Task Force (April 2004). Final Report on the August 14, 2003 Blackout in the United States and Canada: Causes and Recommendations (PDF). Energy.gov – Office of Electricity Delivery & Energy Reliability (Report). United States Department of Energy. Archived (PDF) from the original on May 27, 2017.
