= 2003 London blackout =

- Location: South London & north-west Kent, UK.
- Type: Power outage
- Outcome: 476,000 customers affected

The 2003 London blackout was a serious power outage that affected parts of south London and north-west Kent in the evening of 28 August 2003. It was caused by a series of faults at National Grid transmission substations, which supplied the distribution network operator in the area, EDF Energy (now UK Power Networks).

It was the largest blackout in South East England since the Great Storm of 1987, affecting 476,000 customers. Power was lost at 18:20 BST and restored to EDF Energy 37 minutes later at 18:57, although it reportedly took longer for all customers to be reconnected.

A week later, on 5 September, a similar incident affected a substantial part of Birmingham.

== Impact ==
A total of 476,000 customers supplied from National Grid's New Cross, Hurst, and Wimbledon substations lost power, with a total of 724 MW lost — approximately 20% of London's electricity demand at the time. The London Fire Brigade took around 400 calls and made hundreds of rescues for people stuck in lifts. 1800 main-line rail trains and sixty percent of the London Underground was affected, with passengers stuck in trains underground and power lost in signalling centres. 270 sets of traffic lights failed.

== Sequence of events ==
- 18:11 - A Buchholz alarm alerts the National Grid control centre that gas is present in the oil in a transformer at Hurst substation. This is a significant safety concern which requires prompt action.
- 18:20 - The affected transformer is switched out of service by opening two circuit breakers. As Hurst is a mesh substation, this also disconnects the circuit supplying Hurst from Littlebrook substation. New Cross and Hurst substations are now supplied by a single 275 kV circuit from Wimbledon substation.
- 18:20 - An automatic protection relay at Wimbledon disconnects the remaining circuit, completely isolating New Cross and Hurst substations, as well as part of Wimbledon substation, and causing the blackout.
- 18:25 - Power is restored to the isolated transformers at Wimbledon substation, and the network is secured against further faults. The re-energised transformers are not yet made available to EDF Energy to supply customers.
- 18:40 - Power is restored to EDF from Hurst substation - approximately one third of the total number of affected customers.
- 18:48 - Power is restored to EDF from Wimbledon substation.
- 18:57 - Power is restored to EDF from New Cross substation. The transmission system is now operating normally, although it is reported that it takes longer for EDF to restore power to all customers.

== Reaction ==
After the event, energy minister Stephen Timms and Mayor of London Ken Livingstone called for a prompt report. The Independent published an editorial comparing the event to the Northeast blackout of 2003, which had happened two weeks previously in the US and Canada, and accusing National Grid of under-investment. London Underground was accused by unions of putting passengers at risk, having closed its own power station at Lots Road as part of the privatisation of its electricity supply.

A report was published by National Grid on 10 September, while the regulator Ofgem published an interim report on 30 September, and a full report in June 2004.

== Causes ==
Several factors contributed to this outage. The direct cause of the blackout was an incorrectly installed protection relay at Wimbledon substation, which protected the circuit to New Cross. In 2001 a 1 ampere relay was accidentally installed instead of a 5 A model, resulting in the relay tripping at a current level five times lower than the correct rating. When the transformer at Hurst was isolated, the current in the circuit increased to 1,460 A — significantly below the 4,450 A operating capacity of the underground cable, but sufficient to cause the incorrectly sized protection relay to trip.

The Buchholz alarm which triggered the incident was found to be due to low oil levels in the shunt reactor SR3 at Hurst, which was not in service at the time of the incident. However, the alarm message received at the National Grid control desk was ambiguous, and the operators interpreted it as referring to the transformer SGT3, which was in use at the time.

After the incident, an anonymous engineer highlighted the oil leak to the press, indicating that it was spotted some weeks before the blackout, and accusing National Grid of poor maintenance. The Ofgem report found that National Grid had been aware of the leak since March 2003, and had decided to manage it by periodically refilling the oil until scheduled maintenance.

== See also ==
- List of power outages
- Brittle Power
