= Delhi Disaster Management Authority =

Disaster Management in Delhi, India

- DDMA
- Formation: March 19, 2008; 18 years ago
- Region served: Delhi
- Website: https://ddma.delhi.gov.in

Delhi Disaster Management Authority (DDMA) is the apex statutory body for disaster management in the National Capital Territory of Delhi, India, constituted on 19 March 2008 under Section 14 of the Disaster Management Act, 2005. Unlike other states, it is chaired by the Lieutenant Governor of Delhi, with the Chief Minister as Vice-Chairperson, reflecting Delhi's union territory status. The Divisional Commissioner serves as Secretary. The DDMA sets disaster policy and coordinates responses such as the winter Graded Response Action Plan for pollution, Yamuna flood-preparedness, and the state Heat Action Plan. Each district also has its own District Disaster Management Authority.
