= 2003 Italy blackout =

Power outage in Italy and Switzerland

The 2003 Italy blackout was a serious power outage that affected all of the Italian Peninsula for 12 hours and part of Switzerland near Geneva for 3 hours on 28 September 2003. It was the largest blackout in the series of blackouts in 2003, involving about 56 million people.

== Causes ==
The sequence of events leading to the outage began at approximately 3:00 a.m. (local time) on 28 September 2003, when the 400 kV Lukmanier powerline on the Mettlen-Lavorgo powerline arced to a nearby tree and automatically disabled itself. The line had carried hydroelectric power from Switzerland to Italy, and this current now flowed on parallel lines through France, overloading them. Those circuits could only stably carry the current for approximately 15 min, but the Swiss control room operator was not aware of the urgency. Instead, the operator attempted to re-energize the Lukmanier line, which was impossible because a large phase difference had developed across the line. After repeated failures to re-energize, the operator asked the Italian transmission operator GRTN to reduce its import of power—by now, 10 min into the grace period. GRTN succeeded in reducing power demand 10 min later, but by then the parallel lines had overheated. At 3:20, they, too, flashed to ground, disconnecting Italy from its suppliers to the North.

Without imported power from the north, GRTN lost control of the grid in the next 4 seconds. Frequency dropped to 49 Hz, but this also removed ca. 7.5 GW of distributed power plants from the grid and the under-voltage load shedding (UVLS) could not compensate (cf. figure "Frequency behavior in Italy in the transitory period", UCTE report, April 2004, p. 115). Frequency continued to drop until the under-frequency threshold of 47.5 Hz was hit, and all generators were tripped according to the under-frequency protection settings.

== Effects ==
The night of 27 September 2003 was the first Nuit Blanche in Rome. Thus, many people were on the streets and public transportation was still operating at the time of the blackout (at about 3:00 on 28 September 2003) despite the fact that it was very late at night. Although the festival had already slowed due to heavy rains, the blackout marked its definitive end.

Several hundred people were trapped in metro trains. Throughout Italy, 110 trains were cancelled, stranding 30,000 people, although flights proceeded as normal. Many people spent the night sleeping in train stations and on streets in Rome.

Police described the scene as chaos but there were no serious accidents.

The blackout did not spread further to neighboring countries, such as Austria, Slovenia and Croatia, which are connected to Italy. Only part of Geneva canton and Ticino canton in Switzerland suffered a power outage for three hours.

== Restoration of service ==
After three hours, energy was restored in northern regions. Electricity was restored gradually in most places, and in most cities electricity was powered on again during the morning. Rolling blackouts continued to affect about 5% of the population on the next two days (29–30 September) as the electricity company GRTN continued its effort to restore supply.

== Investigations ==
The final report of the investigation committee on the 28 September 2003 blackout in Italy was published in April 2004 by UCTE.

The blackout also proved a useful case study for researchers in physics and complex networks, who modelled the 2003 Italy blackout as a cascade of failures in interdependent networks. Several nodes in the network of power stations failed, causing a failure of the Internet communication network, which in turn caused a further breakdown of power stations. The goal of research was to understand how to build more robust networks.

== See also ==
- Northeast blackout of 2003
- 2012 India blackouts
- 2015 Turkey blackout
- 2019 Java blackout
- 2026 Sumatra blackout
- List of power outages
- List of the largest power outages
