= Grid Controller of India Limited =

Division of Ministry of Power (India)

Grid Controller of India Limited ग्रिड कंट्रोलर ऑफ इंडिया लिमिटेड
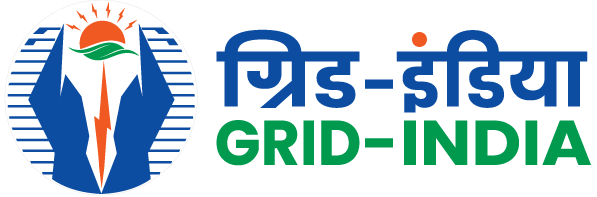
- Type: Division of Ministry of Power, Government of India
- Industry: Grid Operations, Electricity Market Operations, CERT-Grid Operations (CERT-GO), Independent System Operator
- Founded: March 2009
- Headquarters: New Delhi, India
- Area served: India
- Key people: Samir Chand Saxena, Chairman and Managing Director
- Owner: Ministry of Power, Government of India
- Website: grid-india.in

Grid Controller of India Limited (GRID-INDIA) is a division of the Ministry of Power, Government of India. Grid Controller of India Limited (GRID-INDIA) was renamed from Power System Operation Corporation Limited (POSOCO) on 9 November 2022. It is responsible for monitoring and ensure round the clock integrated operation of the Indian Power System. It consists of 5 Regional Load Despatch Centres (RLDCs) and the National Load Despatch Centre (NLDC).

The load despatch functions, earlier handled by Power Grid Corporation of India Limited (PGCIL), have been entrusted to GRID-INDIA (previously known as POSOCO).

== History ==
Central Government, through Ministry of Power in exercise of the power conferred by sub-section (3) of Section 26 and sub-section (2) of Section 27 of the Electricity Act, 2003 by notification dt. 27 September 2010 in the Gazette of India, notified that Grid Controller of India Ltd. (erstwhile Power System Operation Corporation Ltd (POSOCO)), a wholly owned subsidiary of the Power Grid Corporation of India Limited (a Government Company), shall operate National Load Despatch Centre and the five Regional Load Despatch Centers, with effect from 1 October 2010.

The subsidiary was set up on the recommendations of a government committee headed by G.B. Pradhan (additional secretary) in the Union Ministry of Power. To make load despatch centres, financially self-reliant and autonomous, the committee recommended independent and sustainable revenue streams. The move to separate the two functions is in keeping with the provisions of the Electricity Act, 2003, which seeks to separate commercial interests from load management functions. The Pradhan Committee report had recommended setting up a separate representative board structure overseeing the functions of the five regional load despatch centres (RLDCs) run by PGCIL—the northern, eastern, north-eastern, western, and southern regions at that time. The subsidiary was eventually made a separate company effective from 2 January 2017.

Several steps were taken by the Central Government and Regulators in the formation of GRID-INDIA (erstwhile POSOCO). Some of the major milestones are listed below.

• Pre 1994: RLDCs were operated by CEA with budgetary support from the Government of India.
• 1994–1996: RLDCs transferred in a progressive manner to POWERGRID. Budgetary support from the GOI stopped.
• July 1998: CEA finalized an Ad hoc arrangement for reimbursement of RLDC expenses (Rs. 12 Crores for 1996–97)
• 8 May 2003: CERC approved RLDC fees and charges from 2000 to 2001 (Rs. 21.52 Crores in the starting year)
• 2005 onwards: ULDC scheme charges merged with RLDC fees & charges and approved by CERC
• 22 August 2006: Meeting among Committee of Secretaries to discuss upon constitution of Wholly Owned Govt. of India corporation to carry out all functions as an Independent System Operator.
• 5 November 2007: Interactive session convened by Ministry of Power with Forum of Regulators and State Government. The Pradhan Committee on Ring fencing of LDCs was constituted in Feb 2008 after this meeting.
• 4 July 2008: MoP Directive for creation of POSOCO, with Board Structure & gradual separation after 5 years.
• 11 August 2008: Gireesh B. Pradhan Committee Report on "Manpower, Certification and Incentives for System Operation and Ring-fencing Load Despatch Centres" submitted. Report accepted and a meeting called on 7 October 2008 by Secretary Power.
• 15 November 2008: Forum of Regulators (FOR) approves formation of ‘Forum of Load Despatchers (FOLD) and approves FOLD charter in Jan 2009.
• November 2008: Report of "Open Access-Theory and Practice", endorsed by Forum of Regulators.
• 20 March 2009: Power System Operation Corporation Ltd. established with the objective of ring-fencing operation; incorporated as a 100% subsidiary of POWERGRID with authorized share capital of Rs.200 crores.
• March 2009: Satnam Singh Task force report on "Capital Expenditure and Issues Related to Emoluments for Personnel in Load Despatch Centres" submitted.
• June 2009: Rakesh Nath Committee Report on "Manpower Selection, Recruitment Procedure and Tenures for Personnel in SLDCs"
• 18 September 2009: CERC Regulations for the Fees and Charges as envisaged under the Electricity Act 2003, thus providing financial autonomy of POSOCO.
• 19 March 2010: Dhiman Committee Report on "Training and Certification of System Operators" submitted.
• 23 March 2010: Commencement of Business by POSOCO.
• 1 June 2010: Transfer of manpower from POWERGRID to POSOCO on secondment basis.
• 9 June 2010: Ministry of Power designated National Power Training Institute (NPTI) as the Certification Authority for executives of SLDCs, RLDCs, and NLDC for an initial period of 3 yrs. i.e., up to 31 March 2013
• 26 September 2010: Gazette notification by Central Govt. of India that the POSOCO, a wholly owned subsidiary of POWERGRID, shall operate RLDCs/NLDC w.e.f. 1 Oct 2010.
• 1 October 2010: POSOCO notified for operation of NLDC/RLDCs.
• April 2011 – September 2011: 6 batches basic certification training at PSTI Bengaluru
• November 2011: First online certification test completed, leading to 266 certified operators.
• 15 March 2015: Sanction by President for setting up of POSOCO as a Govt. owned company.
• 19 December 2016: Gazette notification by Central Govt. of India notifying POSOCO as a wholly owned Government company with effect from 3 January 2017.
• October 2018: Report on Capacity Building of Indian Load Despatch Centres by Forum of Regulators

• 9 November 2022: Name of POSOCO changed to Grid Controller of India Limited (Grid-India).

The GRID-INDIA (erstwhile POSOCO) was formed as an umbrella organization to give a corporate structure to RLDCs and NLDCs to ensure integrated operation of the Regional and National Power Systems to facilitate the transfer of electric power within and across the regions and transnational exchange of power.

== Mandate for Load Despatch Functions ==
The Load Despatch functions in India derive their mandate from the Electricity Act 2003, which acted as a major reform in the Power Sector for optimum scheduling and despatch of electricity. The relevant extracts of the Electricity Act 2003 are listed below.

EA 2003, Section 26: “Central Government may establish a centre at the national level, to be known as the National Load Despatch Centre for optimum scheduling and despatch of electricity among the Regional Load Despatch Centres.”

EA 2003, Section 27(2): “The Regional Load Despatch Centre shall be operated by a Government Company or any authority or corporation established or constituted by or under any Central Act, as may be notified by the Central Government.”

EA 2003, Section 28(1): “The Regional Load Despatch Centre shall be the apex body to ensure integrated operation of the power system in the concerned region.”

Even the National Electricity Policy 2005 released by the Govt. of India also put emphasis on Independent System Operation through NLDC, RLDCs, and SLDCs. The relevant extract of the National Electricity Policy 2005 is listed below.
National Electricity Policy 2005, Section 5.3.7: “The spirit of the provisions of the Act is to ensure independent system operation through NLDC, RLDCs and SLDCs.”

== Leadership and management ==
At present, the following are the full-time functional directors on the board of GRID-INDIA:-

1. Sh. Sameer Chandra Saxena, chairman and Managing Director
2. Smt. S. Usha, Director (Market Operations)
3. Sh. Rajiv Porwal, Director (System Operation)
4. Sh. Paresh Ranpara, Director (Human Resources)
5. Sh. Amit Kumar Jain, Director (Finance)

GRID-INDIA has the following offices:

- National Load Despatch Centre (NLDC)
- Regional Load Despatch Centres (RLDCs)
  1. Northern Regional Load Despatch Centre (NRLDC) – New Delhi
  2. Western Regional Load Despatch Centre (WRLDC) – Mumbai
  3. Eastern Regional Load Despatch Centre (ERLDC) – Kolkata
  4. Southern Regional Load Despatch Centre (SRLDC) – Bengaluru
  5. North-Eastern Regional Load Despatch Centre (NERLDC) – Shillong & Guwahati

To facilitate the management of large-scale renewable (mainly wind and solar) integration in the grid, including respective generation-scheduling and generation-forecasting, four Renewable Energy Management Centres (REMCs) are under development: Northern Regional-REMC (co-located with NRLDC), Western Regional-REMC (co-located with WRLDC), Southern Regional-REMC (co-located with SRLDC), and National-REMC (co-located in NLDC premises).

== National Load Despatch Centre ==
On 25 February 2009, the National Load Despatch Centre (NLDC) was inaugurated by Sushilkumar Shinde (Former Union Minister of Power) and Sheila Dixit (Former Chief Minister, NCT of Delhi). National Load Despatch Centre (NLDC) has been constituted as per Ministry of Power (MOP) notification, New Delhi, dated 2 March 2005, and is the apex body to ensure integrated operation of the National Power System.

== Regional Load Despatch Centers (RLDCs) and the State Transmission Systems under them ==
The five RLDCs oversee the interstate transmission for the following states:

- Northern Regional Load Despatch Center (NRLDC) : Delhi, Haryana, Himachal Pradesh, Jammu and Kashmir, Ladakh, Punjab, Rajasthan, Uttar Pradesh, Uttarakhand
- Western Regional Load Despatch Center (WRLDC) : Maharashtra, Gujarat, Madhya Pradesh, Chhattisgarh, Goa, Daman and Diu, Dadra and Nagar Haveli
- Eastern Regional Load Despatch Center (ERLDC) : Bihar, Jharkhand, Odisha, West Bengal, Sikkim
- Southern Regional Load Despatch Center (SRLDC) : Tamil Nadu, Karnataka, Kerala, Andhra Pradesh, Telangana, Pondicherry
- North-Eastern Regional Load Despatch Center (NERLDC) : Arunachal Pradesh, Assam, Manipur, Meghalaya, Mizoram, Nagaland, Tripura

Each RLDC maintains its own dedicated website where scheduling and despatch of power within its respective control areas are handled round the clock.

== POWERGRID transmission network failure ==
The Northern Region Grid, which provides power to 9 states in Northern India, including Delhi, experienced a widespread outage due to a grid disturbance that occurred at about 2.35 a.m on 30 July 2012.

Restoration work started immediately under the direction of the then CEO, POSOCO, and POWERGRID's chairman & managing director. A team of engineers tried to find a way to restore the normal supply of power immediately, so that Railways, Metro, Airports, and other power users deemed essential could get immediate restoration of electricity. With the coordinated efforts of the whole team of engineers and constituent state utilities, power supply to the essential services and other essential loads in northern India was restored by about 8.00 a.m., and about 60% of the load of the Northern Region was restored by 11:00 am. This was possible by gearing up the power supply from hydroelectric sources and also extending power from the Eastern and Western regions for start-up supply for thermal generating units of the Northern Region. Thus, the associated problems for want of power supply could be partially overcome by this time. Later, power supply was restored progressively, and by 12:30 p.m. power was extended to most of the cities and towns through POWERGRID sub-stations. The Northern Grid was brought back to normalcy to meet the demand of about 30 GW at 7:00 p.m.

On 31 July 2012, the northern grid collapsed for a second time, hours after the power supply was restored in the entire northern region following a disruption on the previous day. The eastern transmission lines also failed, disrupting power supply in Delhi, Uttar Pradesh, Haryana, West Bengal, Assam, and Punjab, among other states.

Power Minister Veerappa Moily said that transmission grids will be independently audited in three months to ensure that the grids are fail-safe.
