= Rolling blackout =

Intentionally engineered electrical power shutdown

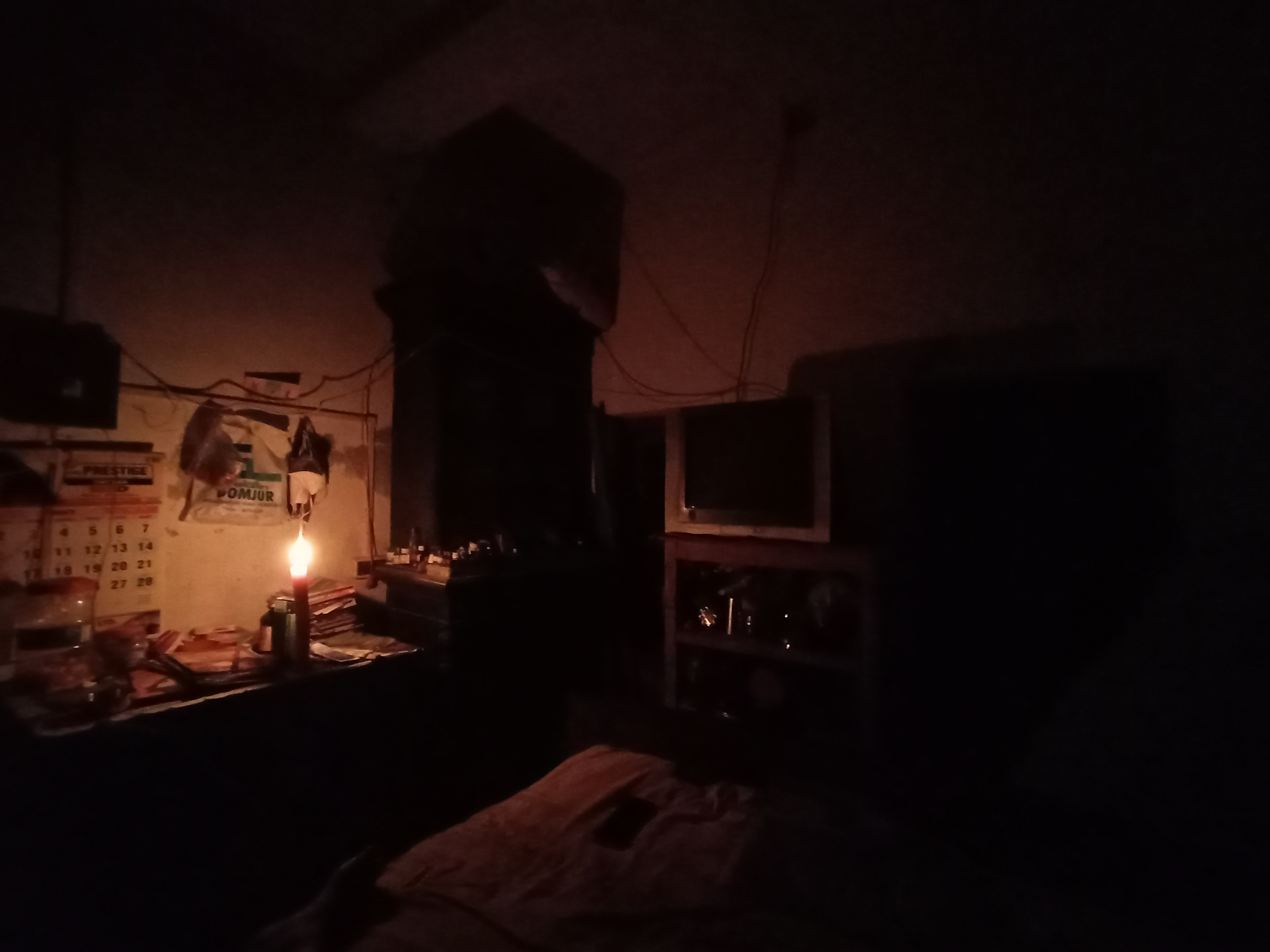
A room during load shedding at night in West Bengal, India.

A rolling blackout, also referred to as rota or rotational load shedding, rota disconnection, feeder rotation, or a rotating outage, is an intentionally engineered electrical power shutdown in which electricity delivery is stopped for non-overlapping periods of time over different parts of the distribution region. Rolling blackouts are a last-resort measure used by an electric utility company to avoid a total blackout of the power system.

Rolling blackouts are a measure of demand response if the demand for electricity exceeds the power supply capability of the network. Rolling blackouts may be localised to a specific part of the electricity network, or they may be more widespread and affect entire countries and continents. Rolling blackouts generally result from two causes: insufficient generation capacity or inadequate transmission infrastructure to deliver power to where it is needed.

Rolling blackouts are also used as a response strategy to cope with reduced output beyond reserve capacity from power stations taken offline unexpectedly.

== In developing countries ==
Rolling blackouts are a common or even a normal daily event in many developing countries, where electricity generation capacity is underfunded or infrastructure is poorly managed. In well managed under-capacity systems blackouts are planned and schedules are published in advance to allow people to work around them. In poorly managed systems they happen without warning, typically whenever the transmission frequency falls below the 'safe' limit.

These have wide-ranging impacts, and can effect the expectations of communities. For example, in Ghana dumsor describes the widespread expectations for intermittent unexpected power outages due to rolling blackouts.

=== Iran ===
In 2021, Iran regularly conducted large blackouts nationwide.

In July 2024, the government initiated 4-hour per day blackouts affecting homes and industries despite 40 °C (104 °F) heat waves, and the severity of power shortages exceeded worst-case scenario predictions. On 10 November 2024, the government began nationally implementing another round of the same type of blackout.

=== Philippines ===
Remote areas or off-grid areas are the most vulnerable to power supply issues. Areas placed with under yellow and red alerts are subject to rolling blackouts.

=== South Africa ===
Since 2007, South Africa has experienced multiple periods of rolling blackouts which are locally referred to as load shedding by the state-owned energy company Eskom. This was initially caused by the country's demand for electricity outstripping supply, and as time progressed, later exacerbated by aging power infrastructure, poor maintenance, and the slow completion of new power stations. It was recently revealed by Eskom's former spokesperson Sikhonathi Mantshantsh, that widespread tender corruption and the sabotage of power infrastructure by employees is one of the primary reasons for continuing load shedding. This has caused severe damage to the South African economy and has played a large part in limiting the country's economic growth.

=== Ukraine ===
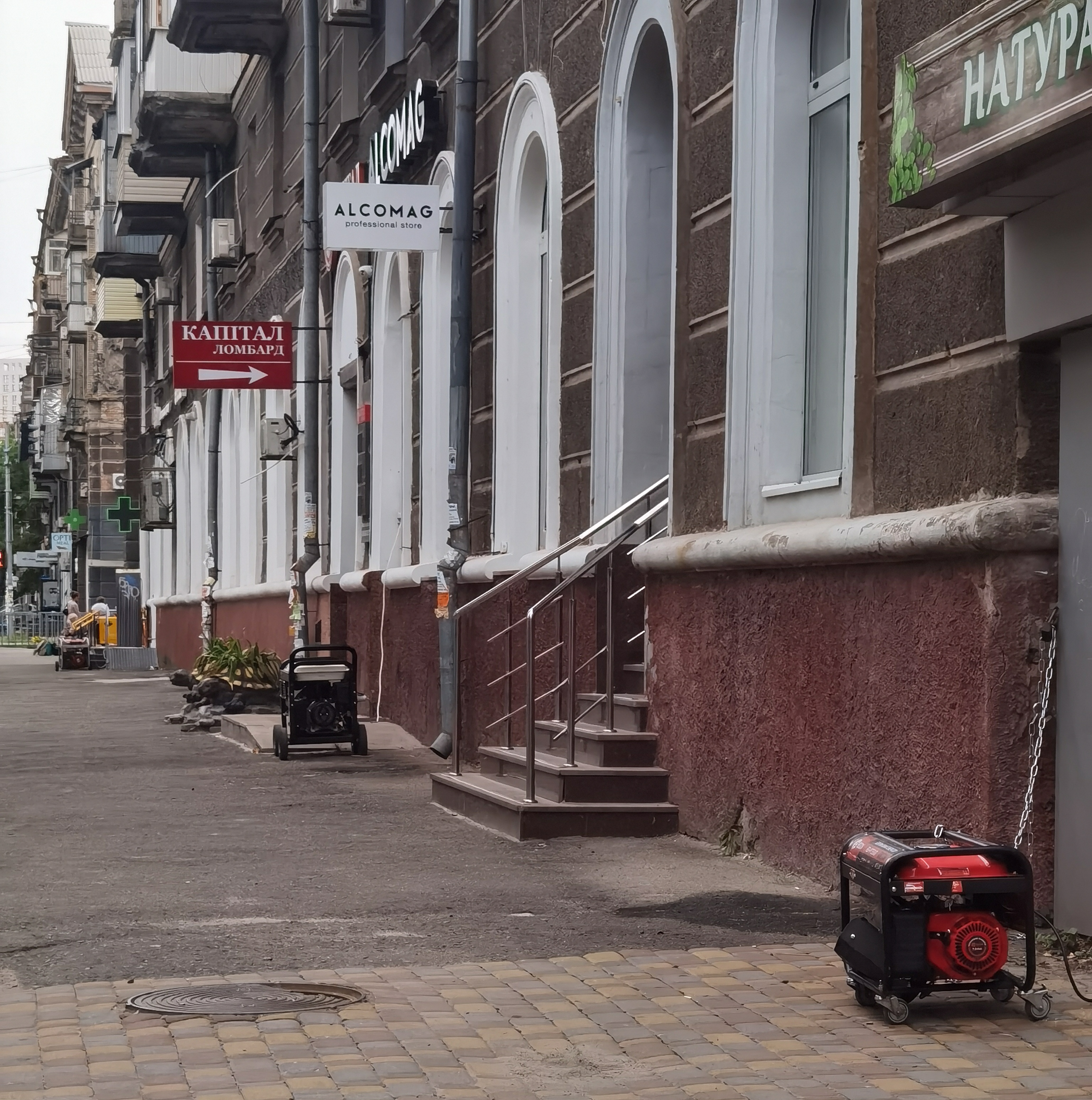
Power generators in Dnipro during the blackouts, 2024

In the late 1990s, Ukraine experienced frequent scheduled electricity blackouts throughout the country's power system due to miners' strikes, the destruction of the coal industry in 1991–1996, the hidden privatization of energy companies and barters in the energy industry, which included even nuclear power.

During the Russian invasion in 2022, Russia conducted multiple attacks on Ukraine's energy infrastructure. On 23 October 2022, rolling blackouts were introduced in Kyiv and its oblast. Rolling blackouts were introduced in all Ukrainian regions on 25 October 2022.

In 2024, Ukraine faced another unprecedented energy crisis due to Russia's destruction of energy infrastructure, re-introducing rolling blackouts. Approximately 70% of the country's heating infrastructure was either damaged or under occupation by May 2024.

=== Egypt ===
In the Summer of 2023, with the unprecedented heatwave that hit the country, the Egyptian government announced it would start a scheduled blackout across all major cities for 1 hour per day until the heatwave ended. However, the blackouts remained well into the winter and were increased to 2 hours per day. In the Summer of 2024, the temperatures rose even higher and the schedule changed to 3 hours per day with reports of unplanned cuts in Alexandria, Cairo and other cities where some places faced over 6 hours without electricity for 3 days.

=== Cape Verde ===
In 2025, the capital of the country, Praia, suffered summer long semi-scheduled blackouts due to increased demand. The country already lived with a deficient and inefficient system and many business reported complaints about the lack of management and communication from the electrical companies.

== In developed countries ==
Rolling blackouts in developed countries sometimes occur due to economic forces at the expense of system reliability, or during natural disasters such as heat waves.

=== Japan ===
After the 2011 Tōhoku earthquake and tsunami, the Tokyo Electric Power Company implemented rolling blackouts. Its service area was divided into five blocks and blackouts were implemented from 6:20 to 22:00. The schedule from 15 to 18 March 2011 was as follows:

Time	15 March	16 March	17 March	18 March
6:20–10:00	Block 3	Block 4	Block 5	Block 1
9:20–13:00	Block 4	Block 5	Block 1	Block 2
12:20–16:00	Block 5	Block 1	Block 2	Block 3
15:20–19:00	Block 1	Block 2	Block 3	Block 4
18:20–22:00	Block 2	Block 3	Block 4	Block 5

=== USA ===
In California, rolling blackouts during 2000–01 California energy crisis occurred in June 2000, January, March and May 2001, and August 2020. The 2021 Texas power crisis involved rolling blackouts caused by the February 13–17, 2021 North American winter storm and lack of winterization. The Late December 2022 North American winter storm resulted in rolling blackouts in parts of the eastern US.

=== Other ===
- 2003 Italy blackout
- 2016 South Australian blackout

== Effects ==
Intermittent access to electricity causes major economic problems for businesses, which incur costs in the form of lost resources, reduced patronage, or curtailed production if electrical equipment—for example refrigeration, lighting, or machinery—abruptly stops working. Businesses in areas that are subject to regular blackouts may invest in backup power generation to avoid these costs, but power backup is itself a cost because generators must be purchased and maintained and fuel must be regularly replenished.

== Scheduling ==
When blackouts are scheduled in advance, they are easier to work around.

The speed at which blackouts roll may be adjusted so that no blackout lasts longer than a certain limit. For instance, in Italy, the PESSE (Piano di Emergenza per la Sicurezza del Sistema Electrico, Emergency plan for national grid safety) does not permit a controlled blackout longer than 90 minutes. In Canada, blackouts have been rolled so that no area had to spend more than one hour without power.

== Causes ==
In some countries, generating capacity is chronically below demand. Assorted factors may prevent adequate investment in generation. Alternately, generating capacity may temporarily decrease below demand due to power station outages or loss of renewable capacity due to the wind dropping or the sun shining less. Natural disasters can also abruptly reduce supply by damaging power plants. A lack of fuel makes some types of power plant useless. Industrial accidents and poor maintenance can also take generation capacity offline. Conflict can disrupt fuel supply, as well as damage or destroy generating and delivery infrastructure.

In electricity grids where power generators are paid a flexible market rate, power suppliers sometimes deliberately keep the generating capacity too low, or fake accidents that take capacity offline, to jack up prices.

Demand spikes can also cause blackouts. Unusually hot or cold weather can cause demand spikes. Independent system operators may introduce rolling blackouts in anticipation of demand spikes, based on often arbitrary minimum thresholds of electricity reserves.

In the case of South Africa, failing and aged infrastructure, lack of maintenance and alleged corruption in the country's African National Congress-led government in the running of their primary electricity provider, Eskom, is the direct cause of rolling blackouts.
