= Air Putih, Batu Bara =

District in North Sumatra, Indonesia

Air Putih
- District
- Interactive map of Air Putih
- Coordinates: 3.290186°N 99.399566°E
- Country: Indonesia
- Province: North Sumatra
- Regency: Batubara

Area
  - Total: 81.27 km^{2} (31.38 sq mi)

Population (2020)
  - Total: 51,959
  - Density: 639.3/km^{2} (1,656/sq mi)
- Time zone: UTC+7 (WIB)
- Postal Code: 21256

Air Putih is an administrative district (kecamatan) in Batubara Regency, North Sumatra, Indonesia.
