= Suralaya Power Station =

- Country: Indonesia
- Coordinates: 5°53′32″S 106°01′49″E
- Owner: Indonesia Power
- Operator: Indonesia Power

Thermal power station
- Primary fuel: Coal
- Secondary fuel: Natural gas, Liquefied natural gas
- Tertiary fuel: Biomass; wood pellets; sugarcane; straw
- Combined cycle?: Yes

Power generation
- Units operational: 4 x 400 MW, 3 x 600 MW, 1 x 625 MW
- Make and model: MHI
- Nameplate capacity: 4,025 MW
- Annual net output: 3,750 TWh

Suralaya Power Station is a coal-fired power station located in Cilegon, Banten, Indonesia. The station has a maximum generating capacity of 4,025 megawatts.

== History ==
The power station project was built in four steps and now has eight units.

Step 1 = 2x400 MW, commissioned in 1984

Step 2 = 2x400 MW commissioned in 1984

Step 3 = 3x600 MW commissioned in 1997

Step 4 = 1x625 MW commissioned in 2011

Step 1 with two units was built in 1984. Coal is the primary fuel used in this unit. Units 5,6,7 and 8 were built in 1997 and 2011, this is the newest and most efficient unit at Suralaya Power Station. It is able to burn a wide variety of fuels like natural gas, heavy fuel oil, straw, wood pellets and sugarcane in the same burners. The plant facilities can transfer 900 tons of wood pellets per hour from ship to shore, although some environmentalists question the benefits of biomass. As a by-product, high quality plaster is made when cleaning the flue gas.

== Power lines ==
The power plant connects to the industrial and metropolitan area using 500 kV and 150 kV transmission lines.

== See also ==
- Fossil fuel power plant
