= Blackout in New York =

Blackout in New York may refer to:

- Northeast blackout of 1965
- New York City blackout of 1977
- Northeast blackout of 2003
- Manhattan blackout of July 2019
