= The Reformer and the Redhead =

1950 film by Melvin Frank, Norman Panama

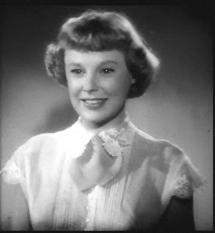
- June Allyson in the film
- Directed by: Norman Panama and Melvin Frank
- Written by: Norman Panama and Melvin Frank
- Based on: The Reformer and the Redhead; 1949 story in The Saturday Evening Post by Robert Carson
- Produced by: Norman Panama and Melvin Frank
- Starring: June Allyson; Dick Powell
- Cinematography: Ray June, A.S.C.
- Edited by: George White
- Music by: David Raksin
- Distributed by: Metro-Goldwyn-Mayer
- Release date: May 5, 1950
- Running time: 90 minutes
- Country: United States
- Language: English
- Budget: $1,123,000
- Box office: $2,127,000

The Reformer and the Redhead is a 1950 American romantic comedy film written, produced and directed by Norman Panama and Melvin Frank and starring the real-life husband-and-wife team of Dick Powell and June Allyson.

== Plot ==
Kathleen Maguire is the daughter of zookeeper Dr. Kevin G. Maguire, who is fired from his job for political reasons. She seeks help from crusading young attorney Andrew Rockton Hale. Trouble comes in the form of both political corruption and a loose lion.

== Cast ==
- June Allyson as Kathleen Maguire
- Dick Powell as Andrew Rockton Hale
- David Wayne as Arthur Colner Maxwell
- Cecil Kellaway as Dr. Kevin G. Maguire
- Ray Collins as Commodore John Balwind Parker
- Robert Keith as Tim Harveigh
- Marvin Kaplan as Leon
- Kathleen Freeman as Lily Rayton Parker
- Wally Maher as Jerry Nolard Boyle
- Alex Gerry as James I. Michell
- Charles Evens as Mr. Eberle
- Paul Maxey as Thompson

Uncredited:

- Matt Moore as Butler
- John Hamilton as Police captain
- Frank Sully as Officer
- Mario Siletti as Italian storekeeper
- Theodore Von Eltz as Announcer
- Jerry Paris as Page boy
- Mae Clarke as Clerk
- Spring Byington as Voice of Kathleen's mother
- Tor Johnson as Big Finnish man
- Edward Peil, Sr. as Gateman

== Production ==
The screenplay for The Reformer and the Redhead was adapted from a story written by Robert Carson that was published in the Saturday Evening Post on January 15, 1949. Soon after the publication, MGM acquired the rights and announced the film project as a vehicle for star Lana Turner, who had not appeared in a film since The Three Musketeers the previous year following her marriage to millionaire socialite Bob Topping. In the coming months, the Hollywood press speculated that Turner, who was reported to be yachting with Topping in Florida, might lose her scheduled roles in two films that had been planned for her, Running of the Tide and The Reformer and the Redhead. By July, the role was assigned instead to June Allyson, who would play the romantic lead with her real-life husband Dick Powell.

== Reception ==
According to MGM records, the film earned $1,688,000 in the U.S. and Canada and $439,000 elsewhere, resulting in a profit of $214,000.
