= June Allyson =

American actress (1917–2006)

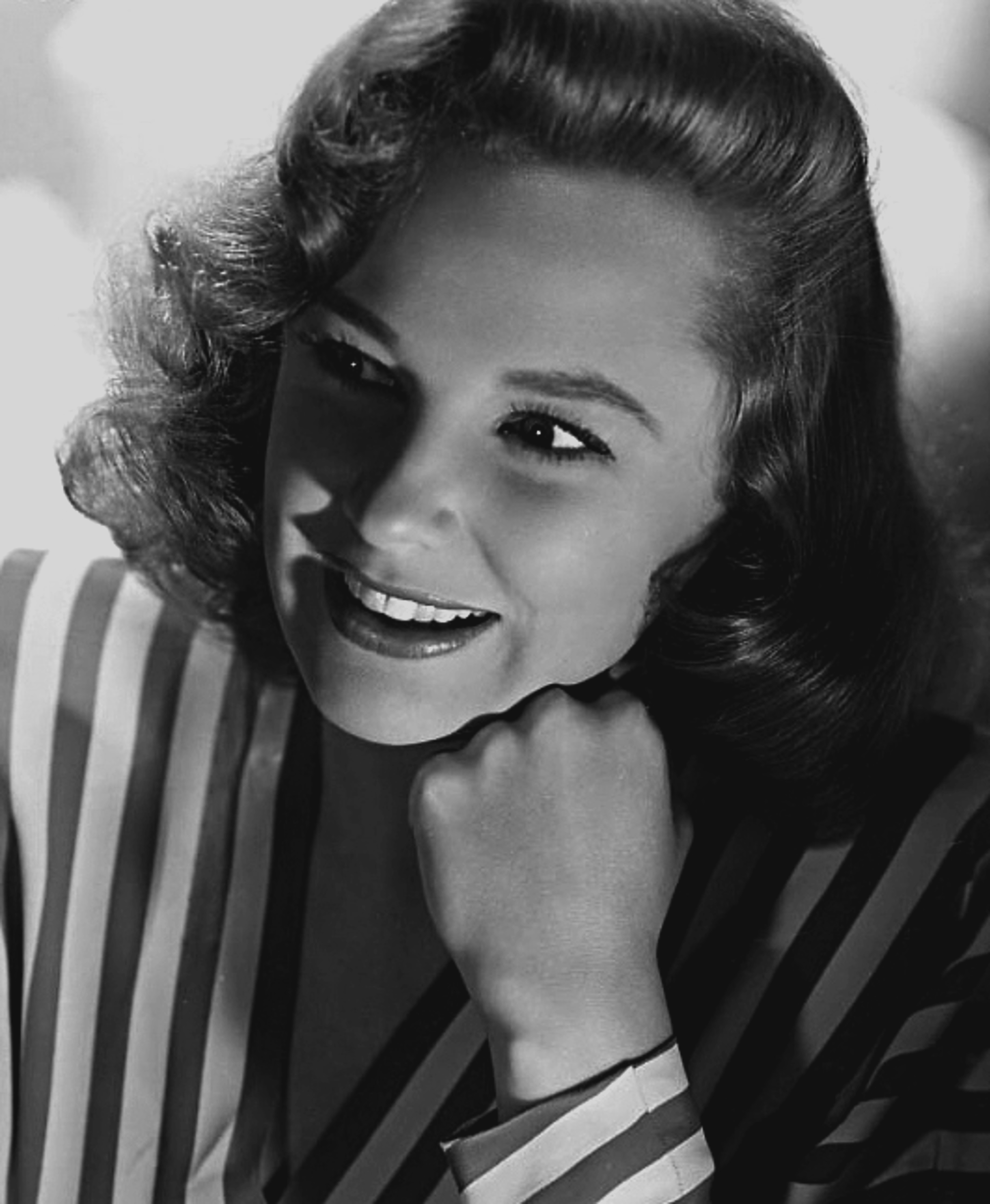
- Allyson in 1944
- Born: Eleanor Geisman; October 7, 1917; New York City, U.S.
- Died: July 8, 2006 (aged 88); Ojai, California, U.S.
- Resting place: Forest Lawn Memorial Park
- Other name: June Allison
- Occupations: Actress; dancer; singer
- Years active: 1936–2001
- Known for: Best Foot Forward; Two Girls and a Sailor; The Sailor Takes a Wife; Two Sisters from Boston; The Three Musketeers; Words and Music; Little Women; The Stratton Story; Too Young to Kiss; The Glenn Miller Story; Executive Suite
- Political party: Republican
- Spouses: Dick Powell (m. 1945; died 1963) Alfred Glenn Maxwell (m. 1963; div. 1965) (m. 1966; div. 1970) David Ashrow (m. 1976)
- Children: 2
- Website: www.juneallyson.com

June Allyson (born Eleanor Geisman; October 7, 1917 – July 8, 2006) was an American stage, film, and television actress.

Allyson began her career in 1937 as a dancer in short subject films and on Broadway in 1938. She signed with MGM in 1943 and rose to fame the following year in Two Girls and a Sailor. Allyson's "girl next door" image was solidified during the mid-1940s, when she was paired with actor Van Johnson in six films. In 1951, she won the Golden Globe Award for Best Actress for her performance in Too Young to Kiss. From 1959 to 1961, she hosted and occasionally starred in her own anthology series, The DuPont Show with June Allyson, which aired on CBS.

In the 1970s, she returned to the stage, starring in Forty Carats and No, No, Nanette. In 1982, Allyson released her autobiography, June Allyson by June Allyson, and continued her career with guest-starring roles on television and occasional film appearances. She later established the June Allyson Foundation for Public Awareness and Medical Research and worked to raise money for research for urological and gynecological diseases affecting senior citizens. During the 1980s, Allyson also became a spokesperson for Depend undergarments, in a successful marketing campaign that has been credited in reducing the social stigma of incontinence. She made her final onscreen appearance in 2001.

Allyson was married four times (to three husbands) and had two children with her first husband, Dick Powell. She died of respiratory failure and bronchitis in July 2006 at the age of 88.

== Early life ==
Allyson was born Eleanor Geisman, nicknamed Ella, in the Bronx, New York City. She was the daughter of Clara (née Provost) and Robert Geisman. She had a brother, Henry, who was two years older. She said she had been raised as a Catholic, but a discrepancy exists relating to her early life, and her studio biography was often the source of the confusion. Her paternal grandparents, Harry Geisman and Anna Hafner, were immigrants from Germany although Allyson claimed her last name was originally "Van Geisman" and was of Dutch origin. Studio biographies listed her as Jan Allyson born to Franco-English parents. Upon June's death, her daughter said Allyson was born "Eleanor Geisman to a French mother and Dutch father." (Note: During her lifetime Allyson published an autobiography that has led to much of the confusion, as her recollections did not correspond to the actual record, starting with her birth date and her family background. MGM was partly to blame, as the studio public-relations machine created a "goody two-shoes" image of a young ingenue which required some imaginative tailoring of her age, family circumstances, and famous "tree limb" story.) In an interview with Larry King, Allyson denied being of German Jewish descent.

In April 1918 (when Allyson was six months old), her alcoholic father, who had worked as a janitor, abandoned the family. Allyson was brought up in near poverty, living with her maternal grandparents. To make ends meet, her mother worked as a telephone operator and restaurant cashier. When she had enough funds, she occasionally reunited with her daughter, but more often, Allyson was "farmed" to her grandparents or other relatives.

=== Accident ===
In 1925 (when Allyson was eight), a tree branch fell on her while she was riding her tricycle with her pet terrier in tow. Allyson sustained a fractured skull and broken back, and her dog was killed. Her doctors said she never would walk again and confined her to a heavy steel brace from neck to hips for four years. She ultimately regained her health, but when Allyson had become famous, she was terrified that people would discover her background from the "tenement side of New York City", and she readily agreed to studio tales of a "rosy life", including a concocted story that she underwent months of swimming exercises in rehabilitation to emerge as a star swimmer. In her later memoirs, Allyson describes a summer program of swimming that did help her recovery.

After gradually progressing from a wheelchair to crutches to braces, Allyson's true escape from her impoverished life was to go to the cinema, where she was enraptured by Ginger Rogers and Fred Astaire movies. As a teen, Allyson memorized the trademark dance routines of Ginger Rogers. She claimed later to have watched The Gay Divorcee 17 times. She also tried to emulate the singing styles of movie stars, but she never mastered reading music.

When her mother remarried and the family was reunited with a more stable financial standing, Allyson was enrolled in the Ned Wayburn Dancing Academy and began to enter dance competitions with the stage name of Elaine Peters.

== Career ==
=== Early work ===
With the death of her stepfather and a bleak future ahead, she left high school midway through her junior year to seek jobs as a dancer. Her first $60-a-week job was as a tap dancer at the Lido Club in Montreal. Returning to New York City, she found work as an actress in movie short subjects filmed by Educational Pictures at the General Service Studio in Astoria, New York.

Fiercely ambitious, Allyson tried her hand at modeling, but to her consternation, she became the "sad-looking before part" in a before-and-after bathing suit magazine ad.

=== Musical shorts ===
Her first career break came when Educational cast her as an ingénue opposite singer Lee Sullivan, comic dancers Herman Timberg, Jr. and Pat Rooney, Jr., and future comedy star Danny Kaye in a series of shorts. These included Swing for Sale (1937), Pixilated (1937), Ups and Downs (1937), Dime a Dance (1937), Dates and Nuts (1937), and Sing for Sweetie (1938).

When Educational ceased operations, Allyson moved to Vitaphone in Brooklyn and starred or co-starred (with dancer Hal Le Roy) in musical shorts. These included The Prisoner of Swing (1938), The Knight Is Young (1938), and Rollin' in Rhythm (1939). She starred in All Girl Revue (1940).

=== Broadway ===
Interspersing jobs in the chorus line at the Copacabana Club with acting roles at Vitaphone, the diminutive 5'1", below 100-lb Allyson landed a chorus job in the Broadway show Sing Out the News in 1938.

The “legend” around her stage name is that the choreographer gave her a job and a new name: Allyson, a family name, and June, for the month, although like many aspects of her career résumé, the story is highly unlikely, since she was already dubbing herself June Allyson prior to her Broadway engagement. At one point, she attributed the name to a director with whom she worked even later. (Note: The name "June Allyson" has been attributed to three different sources and June herself had a different memory of from whence it came, but the use of a nickname and stage name had already begun in her teen years. In the Larry King interview, her recollection was that Broadway producer George Abbott had given her the name, while other sources have her first stage choreographer calling her that in exasperation, as he could not be bothered to remember her real one; at least that was the tale in her book. Probably it made sense to her, as she liked "Allison", her brother's name, and simply tacked "June" onto it, and was reportedly using it before her Broadway debut.)

Allyson subsequently appeared in the chorus in the Jerome Kern–Oscar Hammerstein II musical Very Warm for May (1939).

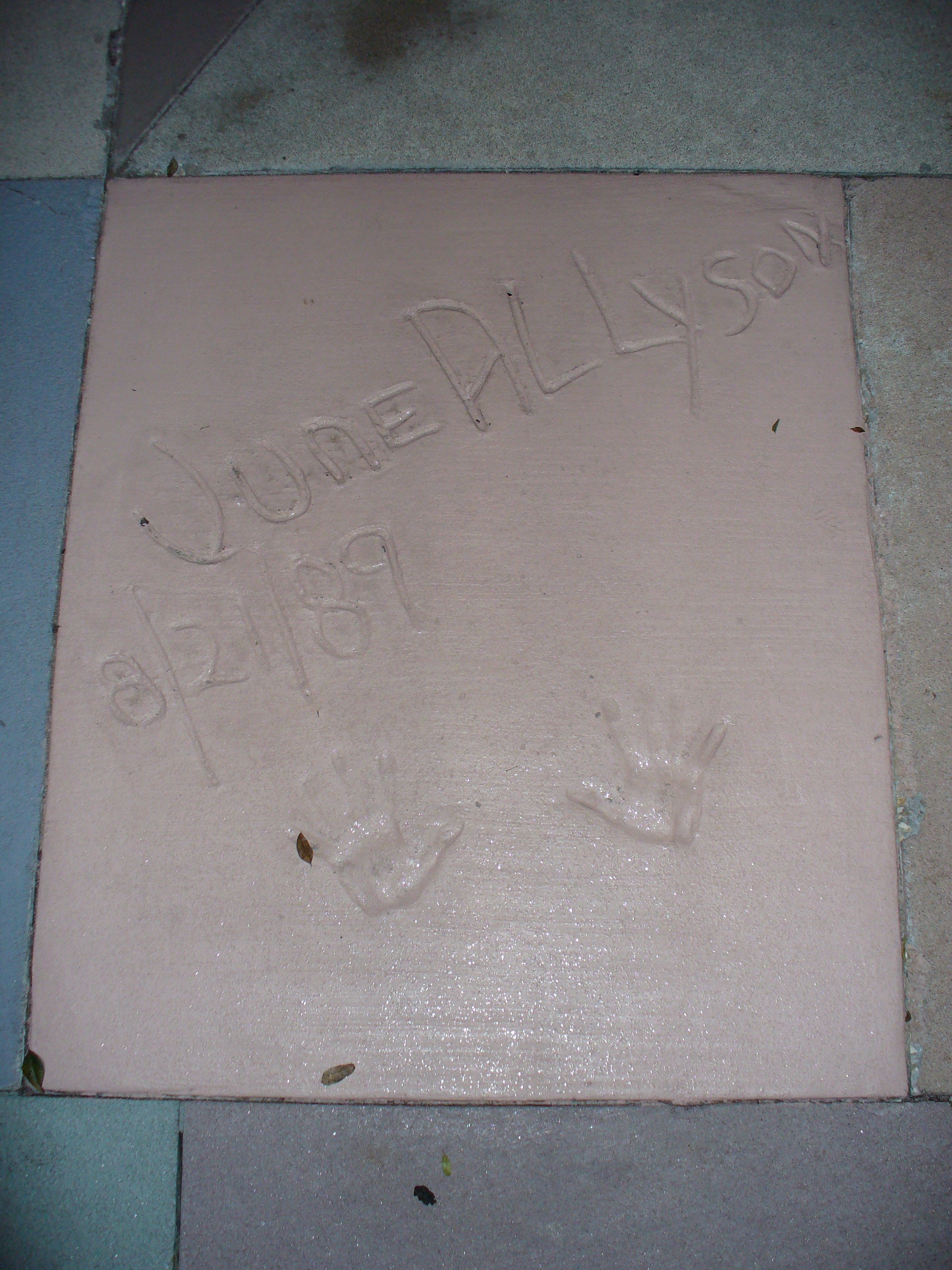
Allyson's handprints in front of The Great Movie Ride at Walt Disney World's Disney's Hollywood Studios theme park

When Vitaphone discontinued New York production in 1940, Allyson returned to the stage to take on more chorus roles in Rodgers and Hart's Higher and Higher (1940) and Cole Porter's Panama Hattie (1940).

Her dancing and musical talent led to a stint as an understudy for the lead, Betty Hutton, and when Hutton contracted measles, Allyson appeared in five performances of Panama Hattie. Broadway director George Abbott caught one of performances and offered Allyson one of the lead roles in his production of Best Foot Forward (1941).

=== Early films ===
After her appearance in the Broadway musical, Allyson was selected for the 1943 MGM film version of Best Foot Forward. When she arrived in Hollywood, the production had not started, so MGM "placed her on the payroll" of Girl Crazy (1943). Despite playing a bit part, Allyson received good reviews as a sidekick to Best Foot Forward's star, Lucille Ball, but was still relegated to the "drop list."

MGM's musical supervisor Arthur Freed saw her screen test sent up by an agent and insisted that Allyson be put on contract immediately. Another musical, Thousands Cheer (1943), was a showcase for her singing, albeit still in a minor role.

As a new starlet, although Allyson had already been a performer on stage and screen for over five years, she was presented as an "overnight sensation", with Hollywood press agents attempting to portray her as an ingenue, selectively slicing years off her true age. Studio bios listed her variously as being born in 1922 and 1923.

=== Rising fame ===
Allyson's breakthrough was in Two Girls and a Sailor (1944) in which the studio image of the "girl next door" was fostered by her being cast alongside long-time acting chum Van Johnson, the quintessential "boy next door." As the "sweetheart team", Johnson and Allyson were to appear together in four later films.

Allyson supported Lucille Ball again in Meet the People (1944), which was a flop. On this film, she met Dick Powell, whom she later married.

She supported Margaret O'Brien in Music for Millions (1944) and was billed after Robert Walker and Hedy Lamarr in the romantic comedy Her Highness and the Bellboy (1945).

=== Stardom ===
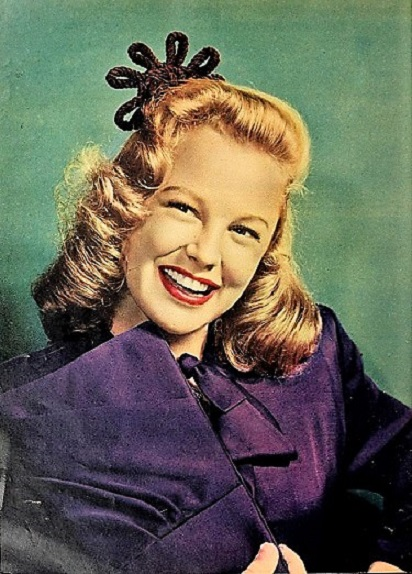
Allyson, March 1945

Allyson was top-billed along with Walker in The Sailor Takes a Wife (1945). She had a role in Two Sisters from Boston (1946) with Kathryn Grayson and Peter Lawford, and she was one of several MGM stars in Till the Clouds Roll By (1946). She also appeared in her first drama, The Secret Heart, in 1946 with Claudette Colbert and Walter Pidgeon.

She was reunited with Johnson in High Barbaree (1947) and followed with the musical Good News that same year.

Allyson starred with Johnson in the 1948 comedy The Bride Goes Wild, then portrayed Constance in the hugely popular The Three Musketeers (1948). Her song "Thou Swell" was a high point of the Rodgers and Hart biopic Words and Music (1948), as performed in the "A Connecticut Yankee" segment with the Blackburn Twins.

Allyson played the tomboy Jo March in Little Women (1949), which was a huge hit. She was adept at crying on cue, and many of her films incorporated a crying scene. Fellow MGM player Margaret O'Brien recalled that she and Allyson were known as "the town criers". "I cried once in a picture and they said 'Let's do it again', and I cried for the rest of my career", she later said.

The same year, MGM announced Allyson would be in Forever by Mildred Crann, but the project was dropped. Instead, she starred in The Stratton Story (1949) with James Stewart, which she later said was her favorite film.

She made two films with Dick Powell: The Reformer and the Redhead (1950) and Right Cross (1950), after which she was reunited with Johnson in Too Young to Kiss (1951).

In 1950, Allyson had been signed to appear opposite her childhood idol Fred Astaire in Royal Wedding, but had to leave the production due to pregnancy. She was replaced initially by Judy Garland, who in turn was replaced by Jane Powell.

Allyson played a doctor in The Girl in White (1952), which lost revenue, and a nurse in Battle Circus (1953), a hit. She starred in Remains to Be Seen (1953) with Johnson, which was a flop. In May 1953, MGM and she parted ways by mutual consent.

=== Post MGM ===
In 1954, Allyson was in a huge Universal Pictures hit, The Glenn Miller Story, which starred James Stewart, as well as another successful MGM film, Executive Suite. She also starred in the Fox Film Woman's World, which was less successful.

Allyson was teamed with Stewart again in Strategic Air Command (1955) at Paramount, another success.

She had a change of pace in The Shrike (1955) with José Ferrer at Universal; it flopped. More popular was The McConnell Story (1955) with Alan Ladd at Warner Bros.

In 1956, Allyson starred in some musical remakes of classic films: The Opposite Sex, a remake of The Women at MGM, and You Can't Run Away from It, a remake of It Happened One Night at Columbia, which was directed by Powell.

In 1957, she signed with Universal to do two more remakes: Interlude, a drama for Douglas Sirk, and My Man Godfrey, a comedy with David Niven. She then made A Stranger in My Arms (1958) with Jeff Chandler. The box-office failures of these films effectively ended her reign as an A-list movie star.

=== Television ===
The DuPont Show with June Allyson (1959–60) ran for one season on CBS and was an attempt to use a high-budget formula. She later called it "the hardest thing I ever did." Her efforts were dismissed by an entertainment critic in the LA Examiner as "reaching down to the level of mag fiction." However, TV Guide and other fan magazines such as TV Magazine considered Allyson's foray into television as revitalizing her fame and career for a younger audience and remarked that her typecasting by the movie industry as the "girl next door" was a "waste and neglect of talent on its own doorstep."

She also appeared on shows including Zane Grey Theater, The Dick Powell Theatre, The Judy Garland Show, and Burke's Law before retiring for several years after the death of Powell in 1963.

=== Return to acting ===
Allyson returned to acting with an appearance in The Name of the Game. In 1970, she briefly starred in Forty Carats on Broadway. Throughout the 1970s, she appeared regularly on television shows such as See the Man Run (1971), The Sixth Sense (1972), and Letters from Three Lovers (1973), as well as a cameo in the film They Only Kill Their Masters (1972). Her later television appearances include Curse of the Black Widow (1977), Three on a Date (1978), Vega$ (1978), Blackout (1978), House Calls, The Kid with the Broken Halo (1982) Simon & Simon, The Love Boat, Hart to Hart, Murder, She Wrote, Misfits of Science, Crazy Like a Fox, and Airwolf. Her last appearance was in These Old Broads (2001). She made a special appearance in 1994 in That's Entertainment III, as one of the film's narrators. She spoke about MGM's golden era and introduced vintage film clips. Until 2003, Allyson remained busy touring the country making personal appearances, headlining celebrity cruises, and speaking on behalf of Kimberly-Clark, a long-time commercial interest.

Allyson became the spokesperson for Depend, a diaper line for adults with incontinence, in 1984. The American Urogynecologic Society established the June Allyson Foundation in 1998, made possible by a grant from Kimberly-Clark. The foundation raises money for incontinence education and research. As the first celebrity to undertake the role of public spokesperson for promoting the use of the Depend undergarment, Allyson did "more than any other public figure to encourage and persuade people with incontinence to lead fuller and more active lives".

== Personal life ==
=== Marriages and children ===
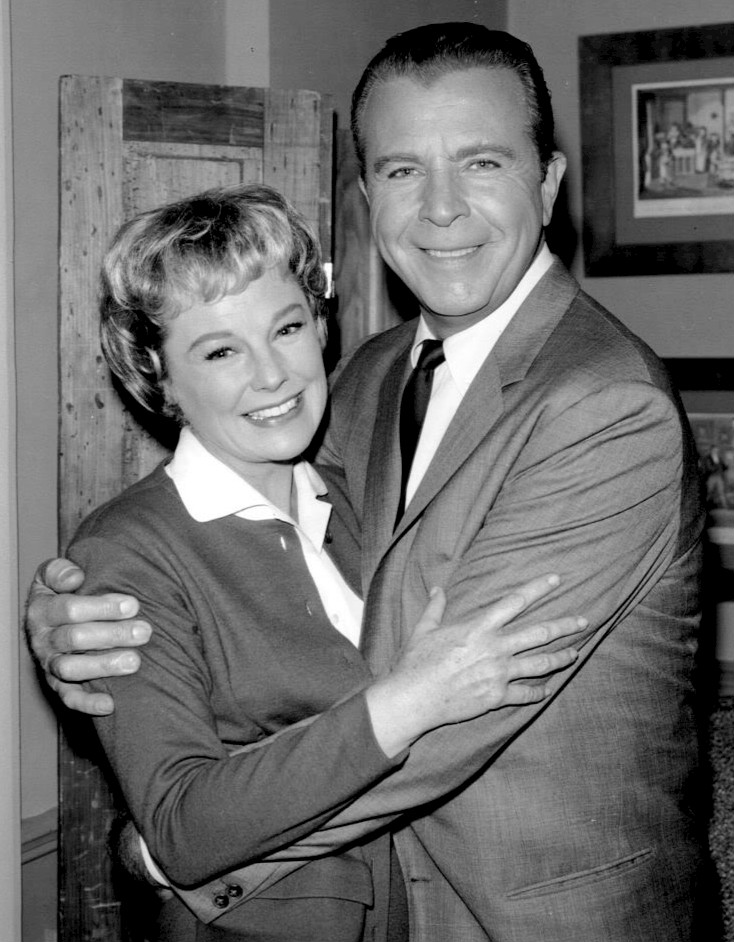
June Allyson and Dick Powell in 1962

On her arrival in Hollywood, studio heads attempted to enhance the pairing of Van Johnson and Allyson by sending out the two contracted players on a series of "official dates", which were highly publicized and led to a public perception that a romance had been kindled. Although dating David Rose, Peter Lawford, and John F. Kennedy, Allyson was actually being courted by Dick Powell.

On August 19, 1945, Allyson caused MGM studio chief Louis B. Mayer some consternation by marrying Powell. After defying him twice by refusing to stop seeing Powell, in a "tactical master stroke", she asked Mayer to give her away at the wedding. He was so disarmed that he agreed, but put Allyson on suspension anyway.

The Powells had two children, Pamela Allyson Powell (adopted in 1948 through the Tennessee Children's Home Society in an adoption arranged by Georgia Tann) and Richard Powell, Jr., born December 24, 1950.

In the mid 1950s, Allyson reportedly had an affair with actor Alan Ladd.

In 1961, Allyson underwent a kidney operation and later, throat surgery, temporarily affecting her trademark raspy voice. She filed for divorce that year, the reason being Powell's devotion to work. In February 1961, Allyson was awarded $2.5 million in settlement, along with custody of their children, in an interlocutory divorce decree. However, before the divorce was final, they reconciled and remained married until his death on January 2, 1963. Later, Allyson reflected on how Powell's death affected her:

I felt I had no props. I'm not really that wise to be able to live life alone and know where I'm going. I felt fear. I felt loneliness. I felt guilt and anger. I was afraid that I would not be able to stand on my own two feet. The loneliness made me feel empty. Then I had an awful guilt. I had always complained that Richard worked too hard, that he had no time for me. I gave him a bad time about this. When he left, I realized that he was working for our future and he wasn't there for me to say, "I'm sorry." I was angry because God had taken Richard away. God should have taken me. He should have left Richard, who had so much more to give.

Powell's death prompted Allyson to start drinking heavily. In 1963, she was going to elope with Powell's barber, Glenn Maxwell, but decided against it. Maxwell and she later got married and divorced, then married and divorced again between 1963 and 1970.

She also went through a bitter court battle with her mother over the custody of the children. Reports at the time revealed that writer/director Dirk Summers, with whom Allyson was romantically involved from 1963 to 1975, was named legal guardian for Ricky and Pamela as a result of a court petition. Members of the nascent jet-set, Allyson and Summers were frequently seen in Cap d'Antibes, Madrid, Rome, and London. However, Summers refused to marry her and the relationship did not last.

During this time, Allyson struggled with alcoholism, which she overcame in the mid-1970s.

In 1976, Allyson married David Ashrow, a dentist turned actor. The couple occasionally performed together in regional theater, and in the late 1970s and early 1980s, they toured the US in the play My Daughter, Your Son. They also appeared on celebrity cruiseship tours on the Royal Viking Sky ocean liner in a program that highlighted Allyson's movie career.

=== Philanthropy and advertising ===
After Dick Powell's death, Allyson committed herself to charitable work on his behalf, championing the importance of research in urological and gynecological diseases in seniors.

Allyson represented the Kimberly-Clark Corporation in commercials for adult incontinence products. She was initially reticent to participate, but her mother, who had incontinence, convinced her that it was her duty in light of her successful career. The product proved a success. In 1993, actor-turned-agent Marty Ingels publicly charged Allyson with not paying his large commission on the earlier deal on incontinence product advertising. Allyson denied owing any money, and Ashrow and she filed a lawsuit for slander and emotional distress, charging that Ingels was harassing and threatening them, stating Ingels made 138 phone calls during a single eight-hour period. Earlier that year, Ingels had pleaded no contest to making annoying phone calls.

Following a lifelong interest in health and medical research (Allyson had initially wanted to use her acting career to fund her own training as a doctor), she was instrumental in establishing the June Allyson Foundation for Public Awareness and Medical Research.

Allyson also financially supported her brother, Dr. Arthur Peters, through his medical training, and he went on to specialize in otolaryngology.

=== Politics ===
Allyson was a staunch Republican and strong supporter of Richard Nixon. Her daughter served as Chairman of the Inaugural Concerts for Nixon's second inauguration in 1973. Allyson also supported Barry Goldwater in the 1964 United States presidential election. She was an active member of the Motion Picture Alliance for the Preservation of American Ideals. In 1952, she, along with her longtime friend and Metro-Goldwyn-Mayer colleague Laraine Day, both of whom were members of the Hollywood Republican Committee, campagined for Dwight D. Eisenhower.

=== Later years ===
Powell's wealth made it possible for Allyson effectively to retire from show business after his death, making only occasional appearances on talk and variety shows. Allyson returned to the Broadway stage in 1970 in the play Forty Carats and later toured in a production of No, No, Nanette.

Her autobiography, June Allyson by June Allyson (1982), received generally complimentary reviews due to its insider look at Hollywood in one of its golden ages. A more critical appraisal came from Janet Maslin at the New York Times in her review, "Hollywood Leaves Its Imprint on Its Chroniclers", who noted: "Miss Allyson presents herself as the same sunny, tomboyish figure she played on screen in Hollywood... like someone who has come to inhabit the very myths she helped to create on the screen." Privately, Allyson admitted that her earlier screen portrayals had left her uneasy about the typecast "good wife" roles she had played.

As a personal friend of Ronald and Nancy Reagan, she was invited to many White House dinners, and in 1988, Reagan appointed her to the Federal Council on Aging. Allyson and her later husband, David Ashrow, actively supported fund-raising efforts for both the James Stewart and Judy Garland museums; both Stewart and Garland had been close friends.

In December 1993, Allyson christened the Holland America Maasdam, one of the flagships of the Holland America Line. Although her heritage, like much of her personal story, was subject to different interpretations, Allyson always claimed to be proud of a Dutch ancestry.

In 1996, Allyson became the first recipient of the Harvey Award, presented by the James M. Stewart Museum Foundation, in recognition of her positive contributions to the world of entertainment.

=== Death ===
Following hip-replacement surgery in 2003, Allyson's health began to deteriorate. With her husband at her side, she died July 8, 2006, aged 88 at her home in Ojai, California. Her death was a result of pulmonary respiratory failure and acute bronchitis. On her death, Kimberly-Clark Corporation contributed $25,000 to the June Allyson Foundation to support research advances in the care and treatment of women with urinary incontinence. Along with her husband, she was survived by her daughter, Pamela Powell, her son, Richard, a grandson, and her brother.

== Awards and honors ==
- 1955: Allyson was named the ninth-most-popular movie star in the annual Quigley Exhibitors Poll and the second-most-popular female star, after Grace Kelly.
- 2007: She received a special tribute during the Academy Awards as part of the annual memorial tribute.

Year	Organization	Category	Work	Result	Ref.
1952	Golden Globe Awards	Best Actress in a Motion Picture – Musical or Comedy	Too Young to Kiss	Won	
1954	Venice International Film Festival	Special Jury Prize for Ensemble Acting	Executive Suite	Won (Note: Shared with the cast)	
1955	Golden Globe Awards	World Film Favorite (Henrietta Award)	—N/a	Nominated	
1955	Photoplay Awards	Most Popular Actress	—N/a	Won	
1960	Hollywood Walk of Fame	Star - Motion Pictures	—N/a	Honored	
1985	Cannes Film Festival	Distinguished Service Award	—N/a	Honored	
1996	James M. Stewart Museum Foundation	Harvey Award	—N/a	Honored	

== Broadway credits ==
I couldn't dance, and, Lord knows, I couldn't sing, but I got by somehow. Richard Rodgers was always keeping them from firing me.

— June Allyson, 1951, Interview

Date	Production	Role
September 24, 1938 – January 7, 1939	Sing Out the News	Performer
November 17, 1939 – January 6, 1940	Very Warm for May	June
April 4 – June 15, 1940	Higher and Higher	Higher and Higher Specialty Girl
October 30, 1940 – January 3, 1942	Panama Hattie	Dancing Girl
October 1, 1941 – July 4, 1942	Best Foot Forward	Minerva
January 5, 1970	Forty Carats	Ann Stanley

== Filmography ==
Film
Year	Title	Role	Notes
1937	Swing for Sale		Short subject
1937	Pixilated		Short subject
1937	Ups and Downs	June Daily	Short subject
1937	Dime a Dance	Harriet	Short subject
1937	Dates and Nuts	Wilma Brown, Herman's girl	Short subject
1938	Sing for Sweetie	Sally Newton	Short subject
1938	The Prisoner of Swing	Princess	Short subject
1938	The Knight Is Young	June	Short subject
1939	Rollin' in Rhythm		Short subject
1940	All Girl Revue	Mayor	Short subject
1943	Best Foot Forward	Ethel	
1943	Girl Crazy	Specialty Singer	
1943	Thousands Cheer	Specialty Singer	
1944	Two Girls and a Sailor	Patsy Deyo	
1944	Meet the People	Annie	
1944	Music for Millions	Barbara Ainsworth	
1945	Her Highness and the Bellboy	Leslie Odell	
1945	The Sailor Takes a Wife	Mary Hill	
1946	Two Sisters from Boston	Martha Canford Chandler	
1946	Till the Clouds Roll By	Herself/Jane	Segments: Leave It to Jane and Oh, Boy!
1946	The Secret Heart	Penny Addams	
1947	High Barbaree	Nancy Frazer	
1947	Good News	Connie Lane	
1948	The Bride Goes Wild	Martha Terryton	
1948	The Three Musketeers	Constance Bonacieux	
1948	Words and Music	Alisande La Carteloise	
1949	Little Women	Josephine "Jo" March	
1949	The Stratton Story	Ethel	
1950	The Reformer and the Redhead	Kathleen Maguire	
1950	Right Cross	Pat O'Malley	
1951	Too Young to Kiss	Cynthia Potter	
1952	The Girl in White	Dr. Emily Barringer	
1953	Battle Circus	Lt. Ruth McCara	
1953	Remains to Be Seen	Jody Revere	
1954	The Glenn Miller Story	Helen Burger Miller	
1954	Executive Suite	Mary Blemond Walling	
1954	Woman's World	Katie Baxter	Alternative title: A Woman's World
1955	Strategic Air Command	Sally Holland	
1955	The Shrike	Ann Downs	
1955	The McConnell Story	Pearl "Butch" Brown	
1956	The Opposite Sex	Kay Hilliard	
1956	You Can't Run Away from It	Ellen "Ellie" Andrews	
1957	Interlude	Helen Banning	Alternative title: Forbidden Interlude
1957	My Man Godfrey	Irene Bullock	
1959	A Stranger in My Arms	Christina Beasley	Alternative title: And Ride a Tiger
1972	They Only Kill Their Masters	Mrs. Watkins	
1978	Blackout	Mrs. Grant	
2001	A Girl, Three Guys, and a Gun	Joey's Grandma	

Television
Year	Title	Role	Notes
1959–1961	The DuPont Show with June Allyson	Hostess	59 episodes
1960	Dick Powell's Zane Grey Theatre	Stella	Episode: "Cry Hope! Cry Hate!"
1962–1963	The Dick Powell Theatre	Various roles	3 episodes
1963	Burke's Law	Jean Samson	Episode: "Who Killed Beau Sparrow?"
1968	The Name of the Game	Joanne Robins	Segment: "High on a Rainbow"
1971	See the Man Run	Helene Spencer	Television film
1972	The ABC Comedy Hour		Episode: "The Twentieth Century Folies"
1972	The Sixth Sense	Mrs. Ruth Desmond	Episode: "Witness Within"
1973	Letters from Three Lovers	Monica	Television film
1977	Switch	Dr. Trampler	Episode: "Eden's Gate"
1977	Curse of the Black Widow	Olga	Television film
1978	Three on a Date	Marge Emery	Television film
1978	Vega$	Loretta Ochs	Episode: "High Roller"
1978	The Love Boat	Various roles / Audrey Wyler S2 E9	
1979	The Incredible Hulk	Dr. Kate Lowell	Episode: "Brain Child"
1980	House Calls	Florence Alexander	Episode: "I'll Be Suing You"
1982	The Kid with the Broken Halo	Dorothea Powell	Television film
1982	Simon & Simon	Margaret Wells	Episode: "The Last Time I Saw Michael"
1984	Hart to Hart	Elizabeth Tisdale	Episode: "Always, Elizabeth"
1984	Murder, She Wrote	Katie Simmons	Episode: "Hit, Run and Homicide"
1985	Misfits of Science	Bessie	Episode: "Steer Crazy"
1986	Crazy Like a Fox	Neva	Episode: "Hearing Is Believing"
1986	Airwolf	Martha Stewart	Episode: "Little Wolf"
1989	Wilfrid's Special Christmas	Miss Nancy	Television special
1991	Pros and Cons		Episode: "It's the Pictures That Got Small"
1995	Burke's Law	Shelly Knox	Episode: "Who Killed the Toy Maker?"
2001	These Old Broads	Lady in Hotel	Television film Uncredited

=== Box office ranking ===
For a number of years exhibitors voted Allyson among the most popular stars in the country:

- 1949 – 16th (US)
- 1950 – 14th (US)
- 1954 – 11th (US)
- 1955 – 9th (US)
- 1956 – 15th (US)
- 1957 – 23rd (US)

== Radio appearances ==
Year	Program	Episode/source
1946	Lux Radio Theatre	Presenting Lily Mars
1950	Lux Radio Theatre	Presenting Lily Mars
1950	Lux Radio Theatre	Little Women
1950	Lux Radio Theatre	The Bride Goes Wild
1950	Richard Diamond, Private Detective	Mrs. X Can't Find Mr. X
1951	Lux Radio Theatre	The Reformer and the Redhead
1952	Stars in the Air	The Bride Goes Wild
1953	Lux Radio Theatre	The Girl in White
1953	Lux Radio Theatre	Because of You

== See also ==
- List of actors with Hollywood Walk of Fame motion picture stars
