= The Girl in White =

1952 film

- Directed by: John Sturges
- Written by: Philip Stevenson; Allen Vincent; Irmgard von Cube
- Based on: Bowery to Bellevue: The Story of New York's First Woman Ambulance Surgeon by Emily Dunning Barringer
- Produced by: Armand Deutsch
- Starring: June Allyson; Arthur Kennedy; Mildred Dunnock
- Cinematography: Paul C. Vogel
- Edited by: Ferris Webster
- Music by: David Raksin
- Production company: Metro-Goldwyn-Mayer
- Distributed by: Loew's Inc.
- Release date: May 8, 1952
- Running time: 92 minutes
- Country: United States
- Language: English
- Budget: $1,088,000
- Box office: $1,344,000

The Girl in White is a 1952 American drama film directed by John Sturges and starring June Allyson, Arthur Kennedy and Mildred Dunnock. It is based on the memoirs of the pioneering female surgeon Emily Dunning Barringer.

== Plot ==
Dr. Marie Yeomans comes to the aid of Emily Dunning's pregnant mother. Emily is so impressed by Yeomans that she enrolls at Cornell University Medical College. She falls in love with fellow student Ben Barringer, who plans to continue his education at Harvard and upsets Emily by asking her to abandon her studies and accompany him. Emily instead moves to New York, where she shares an apartment with Yeomans. Hospitals deny Emily an internship until Dr. Seth Pawling reluctantly accepts her, although he mainly confines her to ambulance duty. Ben has become an intern at the same hospital.

Emily resuscitates a patient who had been pronounced dead. A nurse informs the press of Emily's heroic act, irritating Graham but impressing Pawling, who recognizes her determination and skills. When a typhoid fever epidemic erupts, the need for doctors is so great that Dr. Yeomans is asked to help. She also earns the respect of the hospital's men but dies from heart disease.

Ben is traveling to Paris to continue his work, but Emily heeds her friend's advice to lead a personal life as well as a professional one, so she promises Ben that their careers will not keep them apart.

== Cast ==
- June Allyson as Emily Dunning
- Arthur Kennedy as Ben Barringer
- Mildred Dunnock as Marie Yeomans
- Gary Merrill as Seth Pawling
- Jesse White as Alec, Ambulance Driver
- Marilyn Erskine as Nurse Jane Doe
- Herbert Anderson as Dr. Barclay
- Gar Moore as Dr. Graham
- Don Keefer as Dr. Williams
- Ann Tyrrell a s Nurse Bigley
- James Arness as Matt
- Curtis Cooksey as Commissioner Hawley
- Carol Brannon as Nurse Wells
- Ann Morrison as Nurse Schiff
- Jo Gilbert as Nurse Bleeker
- Erwin Kalser as Dr. Schneider
- Kathryn Card as Mrs. Lindsay
- Jonathan Cott as Dr. Ellerton
- Joan Valerie as Nurse Hanson
- Coleman Francis as Orderly
- A. Cameron Grant as Elevator Attendant
- David Fresco as Patient

== Release ==
The Girl in White opened in several American cities on May 8, 1952. In Memphis, free passes were given to blood donors as well as to the first 25 girls wearing white.

== Reception ==
In a contemporary review for The New York Times, critic A. H. Weiler wrote: "Since medicine is no longer exclusively a man's world, it would appear that the story of Dr. Emily Dunning Barringer, who, at the turn of the century, became the first woman to serve on the staff of a municipal hospital in this city, would make an excellent film. But in 'The Girl in White,' ... the facts of her pioneering and struggle against prejudice, bigotry and hazing rarely are compounded into dramatic punch.. Dr. Barringer merely is revealed as a dedicated woman who finally succeeds in hurdling these barriers. Perhaps it is because the reasons for her urge to blaze a trail are not made as compelling as they might have been."

Critic John L. Scott of the Los Angeles Times wrote: "[T]he movie fails to develop a dramatic punch, and, at one stage, seems to turn into a treatise on medication and surgery. ... This is interesting as, perhaps, a commentary on women's fight for equality, but the factual line of the story prevents highlights of drama. It would seem that director John Sturges went out of his way to hold down any situation that might even border on the exciting."

According to MGM records, the film earned $904,000 in the U.S. and Canada and $440,000 elsewhere, resulting in a loss of $292,000.

== Radio adaptation ==
The Girl in White was presented on Lux Radio Theatre on May 18, 1953. The one-hour radio adaptation starred Allyson and Steve Forrest.
