= Too Young to Kiss =

1951 comedy film

- Directed by: Robert Z. Leonard
- Screenplay by: Frances Goodrich; Albert Hackett
- Story by: Everett Freeman
- Produced by: Sam Zimbalist
- Starring: June Allyson; Van Johnson
- Cinematography: Joseph Ruttenberg
- Edited by: Conrad A. Nervig
- Music by: Johnny Green
- Production company: Metro-Goldwyn-Mayer
- Distributed by: Loew's Inc.; Metro-Goldwyn-Mayer
- Release date: November 22, 1951
- Running time: 91 minutes
- Country: United States
- Budget: $1.4 million
- Box office: $2.3 million

Too Young to Kiss (also All Too Young) is a 1951 American comedy film from Metro-Goldwyn-Mayer starring Van Johnson and June Allyson. The film, in which Allyson's Cynthia Potter masquerades as a 14-year-old child prodigy, was directed by Robert Z. Leonard.

The monaural, black-and-white film clocks in at 91 minutes long. In theatres, Too Young to Kiss earned 164% of its budget, and received mixed critical reviews. Allyson won a Golden Globe for her work on the film, and four crew were nominated for an Academy Award.

== Plot ==
Cynthia Potter is a skilled pianist trying to catch the eye of concert promoter Eric Wainwright, who is only looking for young talent. Potter (in her 20s), masquerades as her own fictional younger sister, 14-year-old Molly Potter. Wainwright is captivated by her skills, and as the two work together, Wainwright develops a paternal affectation towards the young performer, while Potter becomes romantically attracted to him.

== Cast ==
The cast of Too Young to Kiss included:

- June Allyson as Cynthia/Molly Potter
- Van Johnson as Eric Wainwright
- Gig Young as John Tirsen
- Paula Corday as Denise Dorcet
- Kathryn Givney as Miss Benson
- Larry Keating as Danny Cutler
- Hans Conried as Mr. Sparrow
- Esther Dale as Mrs. Boykin
- Jo Gilbert as Gloria

== Production ==
The 91-minute-long, monaural, black-and-white Too Young to Kiss was produced by Metro-Goldwyn-Mayer with a crew of:

- Robert Z. Leonard - film director
- Frances Goodrich - screenwriter
- Albert Hackett - screenwriter
- Sam Zimbalist - film producer
- Frederick de Cordova - film director
- Everett Freeman - story author
- Joseph Ruttenberg - cinematographer
- Conrad A. Nervig - film editor
- Johnny Green - music director

== Release ==
Too Young to Kiss premiered at Radio City Music Hall in New York City on November 22, 1951. It was distributed by Loew's Inc. and Metro-Goldwyn-Mayer. In 2015, the film was available on DVD.

== Reception ==
At the box office, Too Young to Kiss earned US$2.3 million on a budget of $1.4M (equivalent to about $28.5M and $17.4M respectively in 2025).

Upon the film's release, The New York Times' Bosley Crowther was unimpressed with Allyson and Johnson's adolescent antics and the excessive suspension of disbelief required. Over a week later, the Spartanburg Herald-Journal reported that the comedy had been critically acclaimed, and while the Los Angeles Times' Philip K. Scheuer decried the Too Young to Kiss' length, he complimented Allyson's performance as a pianist and the film's "amusing sequences."

Hal Erickson described the film as "fluff", and noted that despite retreading 1942's The Major and the Minor, Frances Goodrich and Albert Hackett's scriptwriting kept the material "fresh and funny throughout". On a four-star scale, Leonard Maltin rated the film at 2.5 stars, calling Allyson's Potter "fetching".

=== Awards ===
Five people who worked on Too Young to Kiss were nominated for film awards, with only Allyson winning hers:

Award ceremony	Date	Category	Nominee	Result
9th Golden Globe Awards	February 21, 1952	Best Actress – Motion Picture Comedy or Musical	June Allyson	Won
24th Academy Awards	March 20, 1952	Best Black-and-White Art Direction	Art direction: Cedric Gibbons & Paul Groesse; Set decoration: Jack D. Moore & Edwin B. Willis	Nominated
