= 9th Golden Globe Awards =

Film award ceremony in 1952

- Date: February 21, 1952

Highlights
- Best Picture: A Place in the Sun

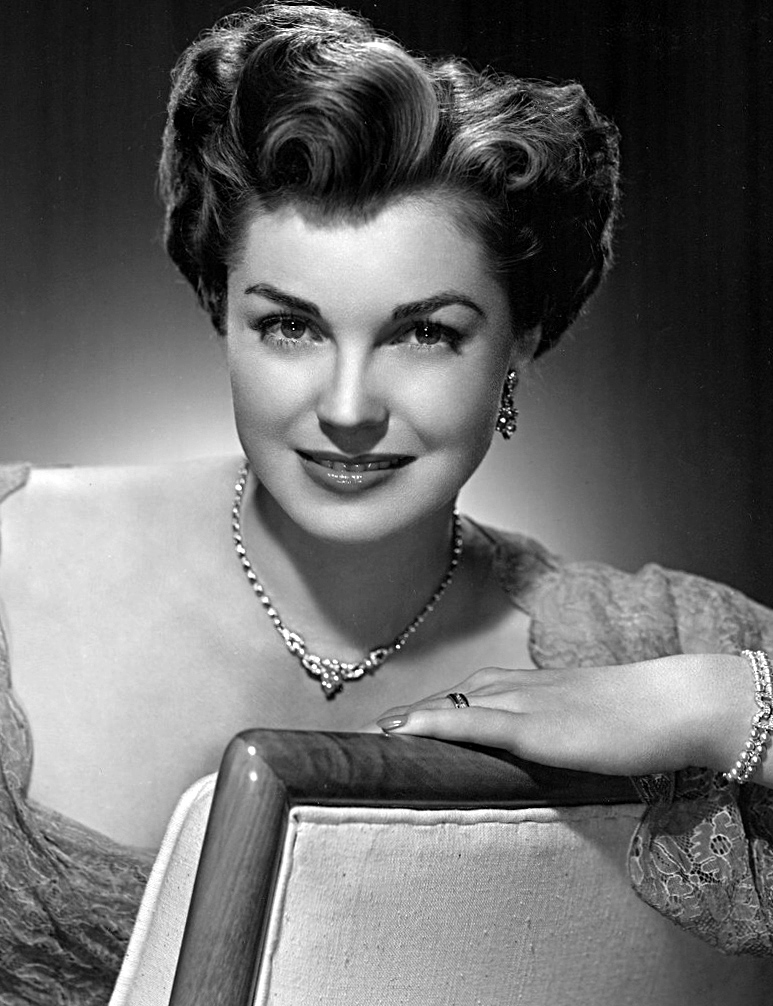
Esther Williams

The 9th Golden Globe Awards, honoring the best in film for 1951 films, were held on February 21, 1952, at the Ciro's nightclub located in West Hollywood, California, at 8433 Sunset Boulevard, on the Sunset Strip.

== Winner and Nominees ==
=== Best Picture — Drama ===
A Place in the Sun

- Bright Victory
- Detective Story
- Quo Vadis
- A Streetcar Named Desire

=== Best Picture — Comedy or Musical ===
An American in Paris

=== Best Performance by an Actor in a Motion Picture — Drama ===
Fredric March – Death of a Salesman

- Arthur Kennedy – Bright Victory
- Kirk Douglas – Detective Story

=== Best Performance by an Actress in a Motion Picture — Drama ===
Jane Wyman – The Blue Veil

- Shelley Winters – A Place in the Sun
- Vivien Leigh – A Streetcar Named Desire

=== Best Performance by an Actor in a Motion Picture — Comedy or Musical ===
Danny Kaye – On the Riviera

- Bing Crosby – Here Comes the Groom
- Gene Kelly – An American in Paris

=== Best Performance by an Actress in a Motion Picture — Comedy or Musical ===
June Allyson – Too Young to Kiss

=== Best Performance by an Actor in a Supporting Role in a Motion Picture ===
Peter Ustinov – Quo Vadis

=== Best Performance by an Actress in a Supporting Role in a Motion Picture ===
Kim Hunter – A Streetcar Named Desire

- Thelma Ritter – The Mating Season
- Lee Grant – Detective Story

=== Best Director — Motion Picture ===
László Benedek – Death of a Salesman

- Vincente Minnelli – An American in Paris
- George Stevens – A Place in the Sun

=== Best Screenplay — Motion Picture ===
Bright Victory – Robert Buckner

=== Best Music, Original Score — Motion Picture ===
September Affair – composed by Victor Young

- The Well – composed by Dimitri Tiomkin
- The Day the Earth Stood Still – Bernard Herrmann

=== Cinematography — Black and White ===
Death of a Salesman – Franz F. Planer

- Decision Before Dawn – Franz F. Planer
- A Place in the Sun – William C. Mellor

=== Cinematography — Color ===
Quo Vadis – photographed by William V. Skall

=== Promoting International Understanding ===
The Day the Earth Stood Still – Robert Wise

=== Special Achievement Award ===
Alain Resnais

=== Henrietta Award (World Film Favorites) ===
Esther Williams

=== New Star of the Year Actor ===
Kevin McCarthy

=== New Star of the Year Actress ===
Pier Angeli
