= Blackout (1978 film) =

1978 film by Eddy Matalon

- US theatrical release poster
- Directed by: Eddy Matalon
- Screenplay by: John C.W. Saxton
- Story by: John Dunning; Eddy Matalon
- Produced by: John Dunning; Eddy Matalon; Nicole Boisvert
- Starring: Jim Mitchum; Robert Carradine; Belinda J. Montgomery; June Allyson; Jean-Pierre Aumont; Ray Milland
- Cinematography: Jean-Jacques Tarbès
- Edited by: Debra Karen
- Music by: Didier Vasseur
- Production company: Maki Films; Dal Productions; Les Productions Agora; Sommerville House
- Distributed by: F.F.C.M. (France); Cinépix (Canada)
- Release dates: 28 June 1978 (France); 25 August 1978 (Canada)
- Running time: 92 minutes 89 minutes (France)
- Countries: France; Canada
- Language: English
- Budget: $1.2 million

Blackout (French: New York Blackout) is a 1978 disaster thriller film directed, co-written and produced by Eddy Matalon, and starring Jim Mitchum, Robert Carradine, Belinda Montgomery, June Allyson, Jean-Pierre Aumont and Ray Milland. The film centers on four escaped prisoners who take over a posh Manhattan apartment complex during New York City's 1977 blackout.

== Plot summary ==
Four sadistic criminals who, after escaping during a transfer, take over a posh Manhattan apartment complex and start looting and terrorizing its occupants during New York City's 1977 blackout. Police officer Dan Evans sets out to rescue the hostages.

== Cast ==
- Jim Mitchum as Dan Evans
- Robert Carradine as Christie
- Belinda J. Montgomery as Annie Gallo
- June Allyson as Mrs. Grant
- Jean-Pierre Aumont as Henri Lee
- Ray Milland as Richard Stafford
- Terry Haig as Eddy
- Don Granbery as Victor "Chico" Tropeck
- Victor B. Tyler as Marcus Morgan
- Fred Doederlein as Grant
- Arthur Grosser
- Peter MacNeill
- Louis Negin
- Vlasta Vrana
- John Wildman

== Production ==
The film was financed by Canada's Cinépix Film Properties. Ivan Reitman was one of the executive producers. Shooting took place mainly in Montreal, with some exterior location shooting in New York City.

Joseph Cotten was originally announced to appear in the film, but was recast before shooting started.

== Release ==
The film screened at the Marché du Film in Cannes on 18 May 1978. It premiered in France on 28 June, and in Canada on 25 August. In the United States, the film was distributed by New World Pictures, and was first released in Chicago on 7 July.

=== Home media ===
The film was released on Blu-Ray by boutique label Code Red in 2019.

== Reception ==
Chuck O'Leary of Fulvue Drive-in stated in his review: "A serviceable little B movie made to exploit New York City's famous 1977 blackout".

Reviewing the film's 2019 Blu-Ray release, Brian Orndorf called it "a scrappy Canadian production trying to play into disaster movie trends, using the real-world nightmare of the 1977 New York City blackout to inspire sleazy violence and lackluster supercop heroism. It's certainly aggressive, but also sloppy, delivering drive-in thrills with limited appreciation for tight editing and multi-character juggling."
