= The Letters (1973 film) =

- Genre: Drama
- Written by: James G. Hirsch; Ellis Marcus; Hal Sitowitz
- Directed by: Paul Krasny; Gene Nelson
- Starring: John Forsythe; Jane Powell; Dina Merrill; Leslie Nielsen; Barbara Stanwyck
- Music by: Pete Rugolo
- Country of origin: United States
- Original language: English

Production
- Executive producers: Leonard Goldberg; Aaron Spelling
- Producer: Paul Junger Witt
- Cinematography: Leonard J. South; Tim Southcott
- Editors: David Berlatsky; Carroll Sax; Robert L. Swanson
- Running time: 74 minutes
- Production company: ABC Circle Films

Original release
- Network: ABC
- Release: March 6, 1973

The Letters is a 1973 American made-for-television drama film starring John Forsythe, Jane Powell, Dina Merrill, Leslie Nielsen and Barbara Stanwyck. It premiered as the ABC Movie of the Week on March 6, 1973.

It was followed by a sequel, Letters from Three Lovers (1973).

== Plot ==
The lives of three families (the Andersons, the Parkingtons and the Forresters) are affected by a year-long delay in the arrival of mail.

== Cast ==
=== The Andersons segment: "Dear Elaine" ===
- John Forsythe as Paul Anderson
- Henry Jones as The Mailman
- Jane Powell as Elaine Anderson
- Lesley Ann Warren as Laura Reynolds
- Trish Mahoney as Stewardess
- Gary Dubin as Paul Anderson Jr.
- Mia Bendixsen as Lisa

=== The Parkingtons segment: "Dear Penelope" ===
- Dina Merrill as Penelope Parkington
- Leslie Nielsen as Derek Childs
- Barbara Stanwyck as Geraldine Parkington
- Gil Stuart as Michael
- Orville Sherman as Minister

=== The Forresters segment: "Dear Mrs. Forrester" ===
- Pamela Franklin as Karen Forrester
- Ida Lupino as Mrs. Forrester
- Ben Murphy as Joe Randolph
- Shelley Novack as Sonny
- Frederick Herrick as Billy
- Ann Noland as Sally
- Brick Huston as Officer
- Charles Picerni as 1st Man
