= Gouverneur Health =

- NYC Health + Hospitals
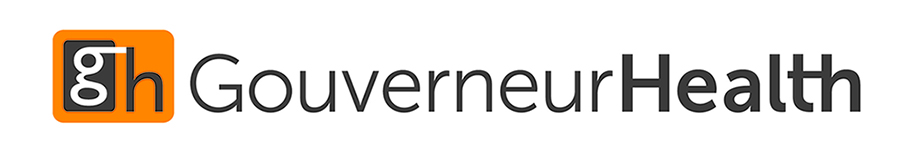

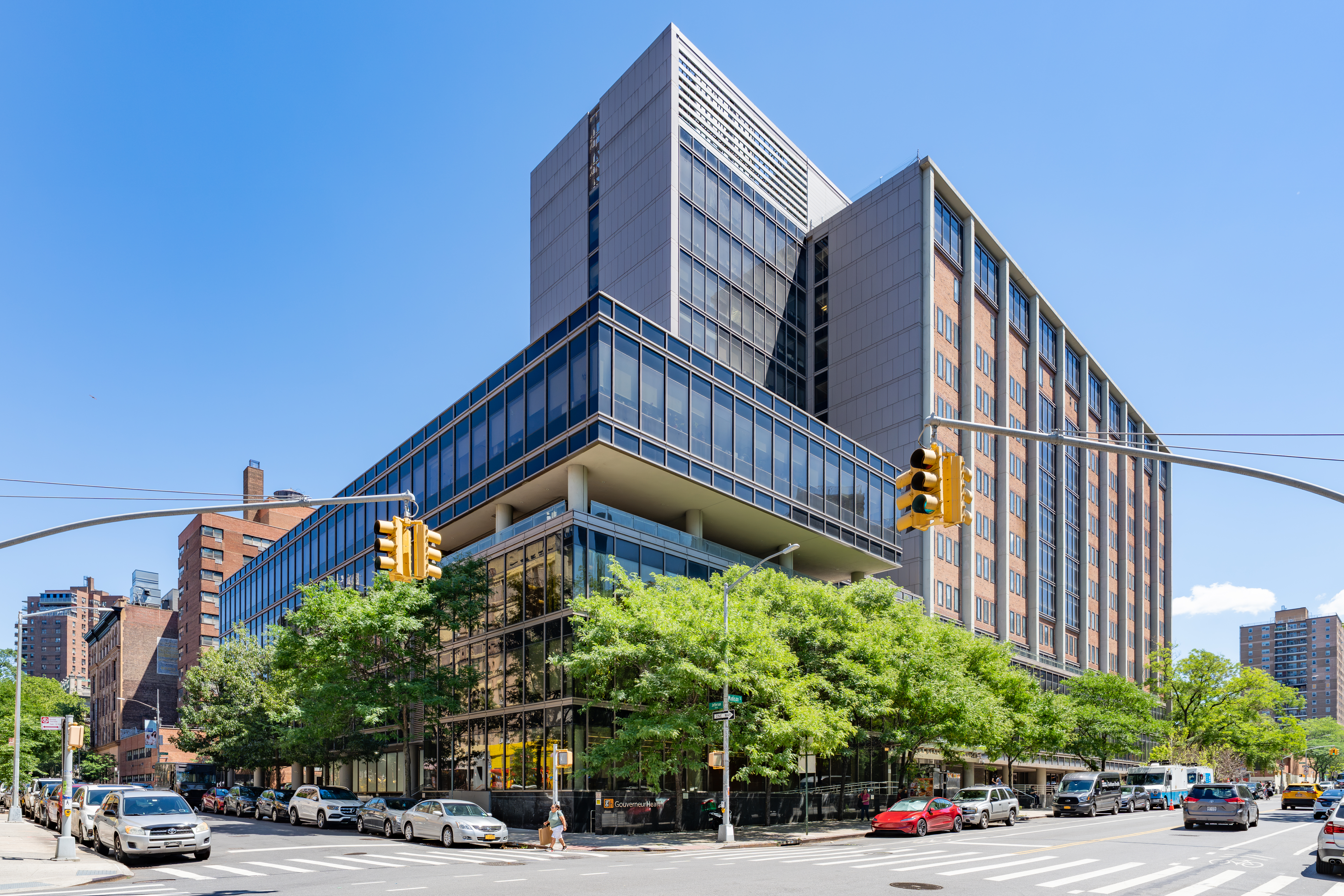

Geography
- Location: 227 Madison Street, Manhattan, New York City,, New York, United States
- Coordinates: 40.713°N 73.988°W

Organization
- Care system: Medicare, Medicaid, public
- Affiliated university: New York University
- Network: New York City Health and Hospitals Corporation

Services
- Beds: 295

History
- Founded: 1885

Links
- Website: www.gouverneurhealth.org
- Lists: Hospitals in New York State
- Other links: List of hospitals in Manhattan
- Gouverneur Hospital
- U.S. National Register of Historic Places
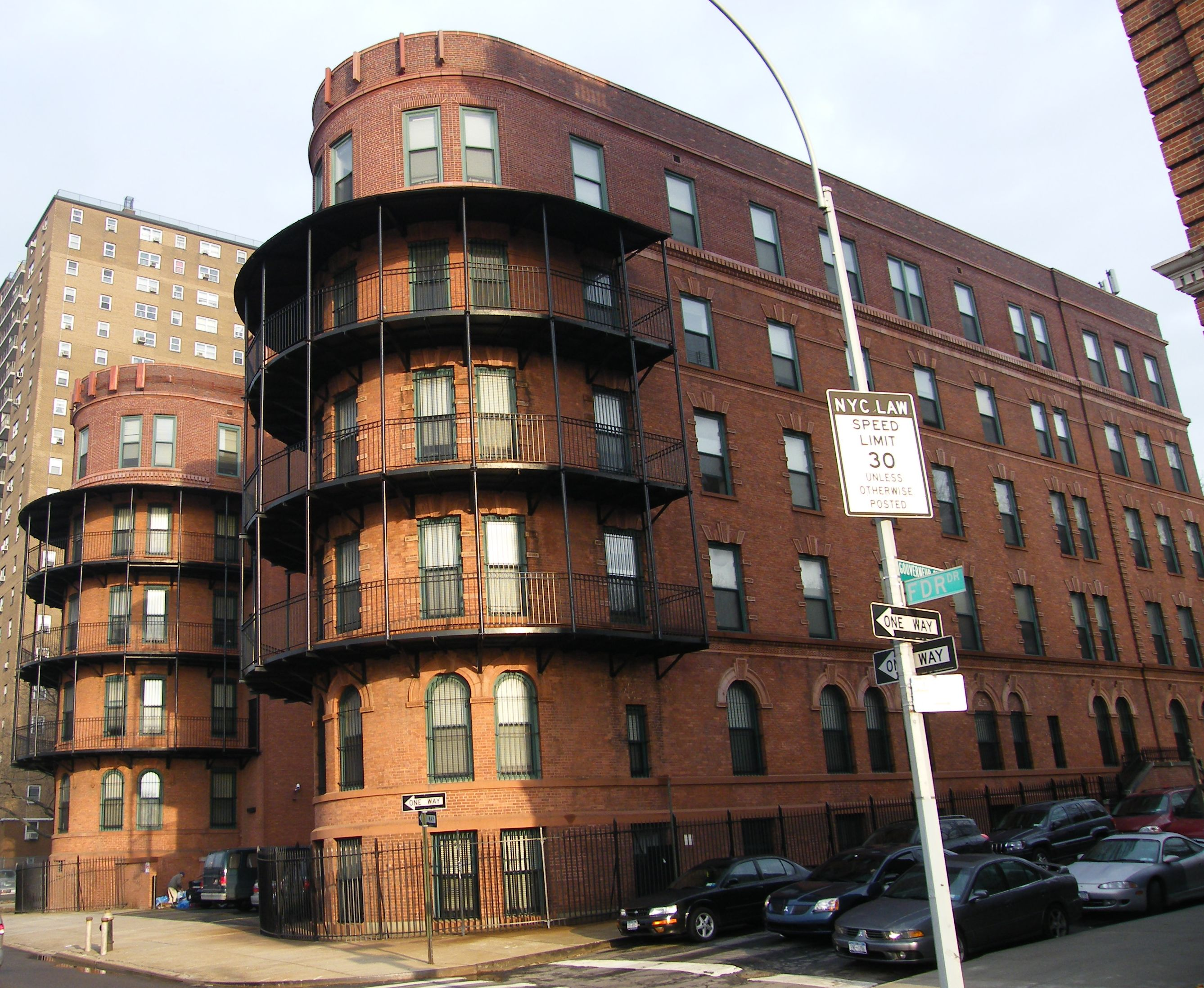
- Gouverneur Hospital's old building at Water Street in 2009

- Location within New York City
- Location: 621 Water Street, New York, New York
- Area: 1 acre (0.40 ha)
- Built: 1897
- Architect: John Rochester Thomas
- Architectural style: Renaissance
- NRHP reference No.: 82001194
- Added to NRHP: October 29, 1982

Gouverneur Health, formerly Gouverneur Hospital, (pronounced GU-ver-neer) is a municipally owned healthcare facility in New York City affiliated with the New York University School of Medicine. It is located at 227 Madison Street in Lower Manhattan. The facility offers comprehensive healthcare services, including outpatient, specialty, and skilled nursing care. It primarily serves residents of Manhattan, Brooklyn and Queens.

Gouverneur Health comprises The Residence at Gouverneur Court, a nursing home with 295 beds; and the Center for Community Health and Wellness, the largest freestanding ambulatory care center in New York State. It originally opened in 1885, and moved to its current location in 1972. A multi-year modernization project was completed in 2014, expanding the facility dramatically. The facility is a member of the New York City Health and Hospitals Corporation and officially known as NYC Health + Hospitals/Gouverneur.

== Facilities ==
Gouverneur Health is Medicare and Medicaid certified, and has a 295-bed nursing facility with 24-hour care. It is one of the largest institutions in Lower Manhattan, and the largest freestanding ambulatory care center in New York State. It serves approximately 50,000 patients a year, predominantly Hispanic and Chinese New Yorkers. It also provides interpreter services for non-English speakers and immigrants.

The modernization project completed in 2014 created a new 450,000-square-foot state-of-the-art health care center; and 85 new nursing home beds (increasing the total to 295) for The Residence at Gouverneur Court, a modern skilled nursing facility with rehabilitative medicine, long-term care, wound management, and hospice services. It is affiliated with the NYU Rusk Institute of Rehabilitative Medicine.

Renovations of The Center for Community Health and Wellness, an ambulatory care pavilion that serves over 345,000 outpatient visits per year, include a newly renovated 30,000-square-foot Women and Children's Center; a new digital radiology center; on-site pharmacy; and laboratory services. Specialty services include prenatal care, rehabilitation, and a new 16-chair dental suite. The building is glass and steel, wrapped around red brick, an open and inviting style with much natural light.

Since the mid-1970s, Gouverneur has had an academic affiliation with the New York University Medical School. Since 1991, Gouverneur has been an outpatient and teaching center for NYU's Primary Care Internal Medicine Residency Program. Gouverneur also has three community health centers below 14th Street in Manhattan, and offers mobile medical and dental vans to bring assistance directly to those with difficulty accessing services.

== Services ==
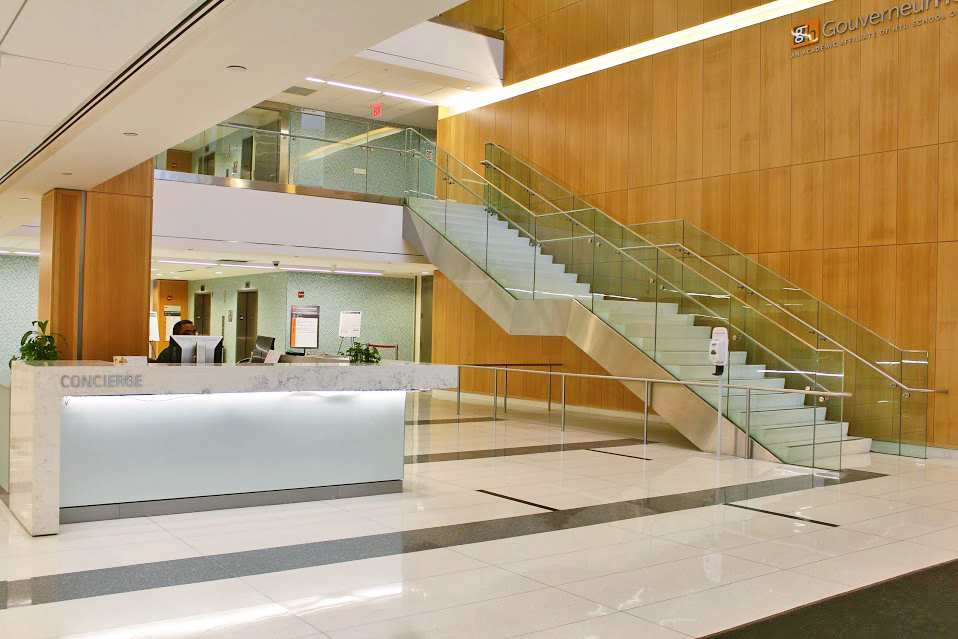
The main lobby at Gouverneur Health

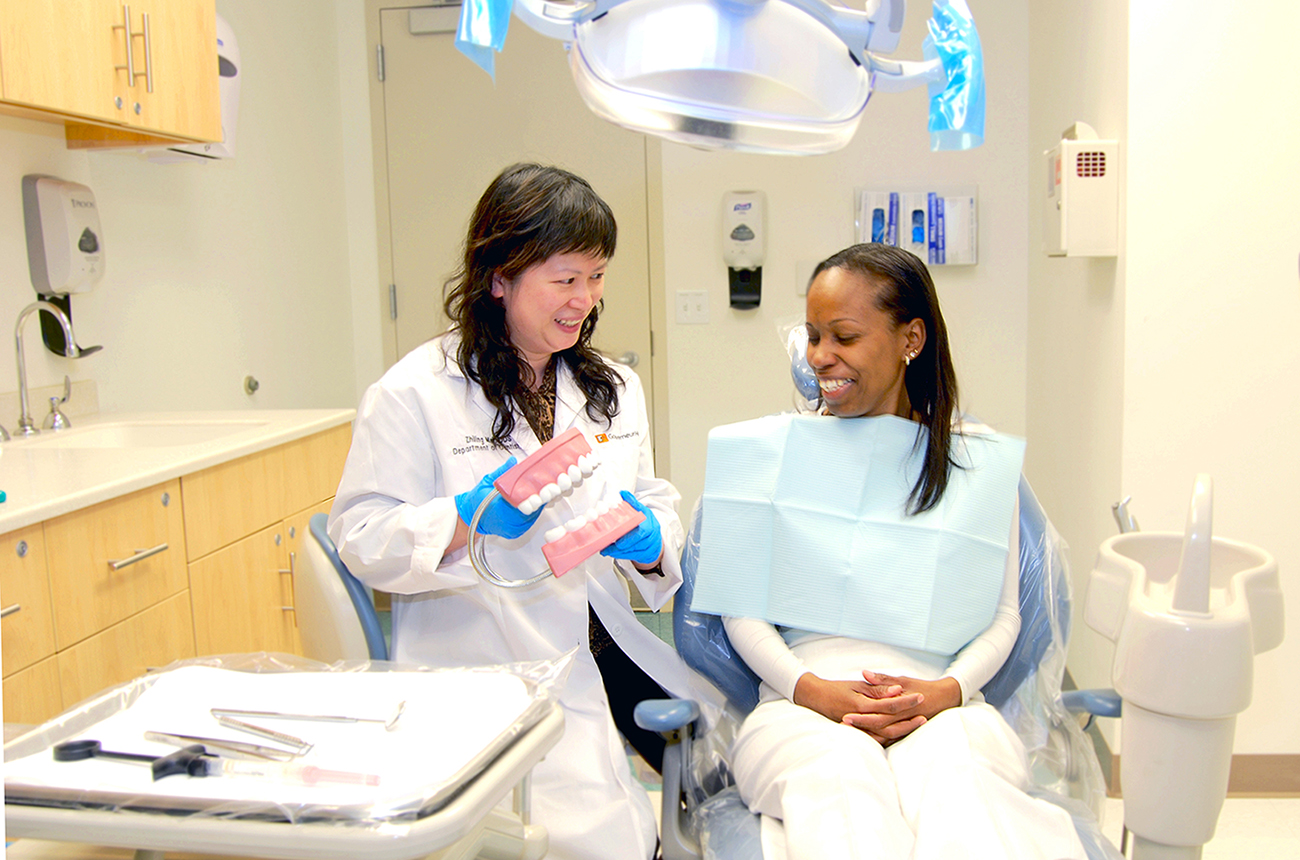
Dental care at Gouverneur Health

Specialty	Notes
Behavioral health	Evaluation and therapy
Cardiology	Stress testing and echocardiography
Dental care	Including general, cosmetic, dentures, children's dentistry and oral surgery
Dermatology	
Ear, nose and throat	
Endocrinology	
Eye care	Ophthalmology and optometry
Gastroenterology	
HIV care	At the Leicht Clinic
Laboratory	
Nursing facility	295-bed skilled nursing facility with 24-hour care, for short-term, long-term and hospice care
Occupational therapy	
Pediatrics and adolescent medicine	
Pharmacy	
Physical therapy	
Podiatry	
Prenatal care	
Primary medicine	For adults 18+
Radiology and imaging	
Rheumatology	
Short-term rehabilitation	Physical therapy and occupational therapy
Surgery	
Vascular clinic	Diagnostic
Women's health	Including obstetrics, gynecology and prenatal care
Women, Infants and Children program	For pregnant women and mothers of children up to age 5
World Trade Center Environmental Health Center	Treatment for medical conditions related to 9/11

== History ==
=== Early years (1885–1958) ===
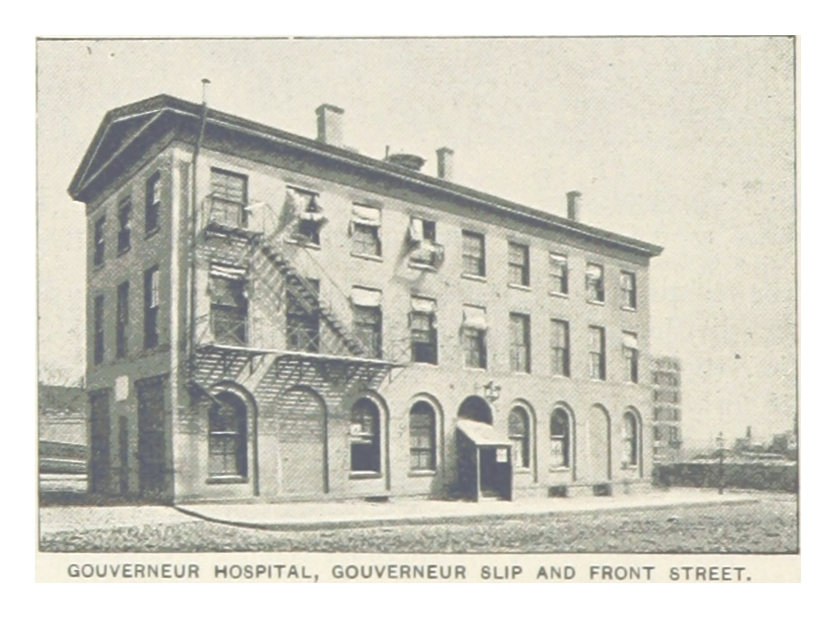
Old building, Gouverneur Slip & Front St

Gouverneur Hospital opened in 1885, in a three-story building on Manhattan's Lower East Side. It was New York City's 19th municipal hospital, serving residents of the Lower East Side, a neighborhood that was at the time expanding with European immigration. It was the first public hospital in the United States to create a tuberculosis clinic, and the first to employ a female ambulance surgeon, Dr. Emily Dunning Barringer. When the hospital opened in 1885, its sole intent was to treat accident cases. Any patient needing to stay overnight was sent to nearby Bellevue Hospital. This soon changed – about two years after opening, the hospital had 40 beds in use. An 1894 article in the New York Times stated that Gouverneur did not have the resources or the space to properly serve the growing community.

Dr. Emily Dunning Barringer as a resident at Gouverneur, c. 1900.

On May 12, 1897, construction began on a new and improved $200,000 four-story hospital nearby, with four wards and 104 beds. Gouverneur Hospital moved to the new building at 621 Water Street in 1901.

The health care plan HIP has its origins in Gouverneur Hospital. In 1940, Gouverneur's Dr. George A. Baehr organized a prepaid medical plan for low-income patients, which ultimately evolved into HIP.

=== Move and modernization (1959–present) ===
In 1959, Gouverneur lost its accreditation, and the hospital closed about a decade later. It was replaced by a new Gouverneur Hospital at 227 Madison Street, which formally opened on September 21, 1972. A 14-story, 216-bed hospital with an emergency room and outpatient clinics, the new building served Little Italy, Chinatown and the Lower East Side. Professional services at Gouverneur were initially provided by Beth Israel Hospital, through the New York City Health and Hospitals Corporation (HHC). The HHC took over the municipal system in 1970, and Gouverneur was the first new institution opened by the HHC.

This building was added to the National Register of Historic Places on October 29, 1982. and became an assisted living residence called Gouverneur Court in 1994. The Water Street building had a series of murals depicting the fictional character Alice, which were removed for conservation in 1981, after the Water Street building had closed.

In 2008, Gouverneur Hospital became Gouverneur Health. Starting on September 22, 2008, a four-year, $180 million modernization project was embarked upon at 227 Madison Street. New and refurbished buildings were added, expanding the facility's primary and preventative healthcare services by 15%. The modernization project was completed in 2014, making the building thirteen stories high, with a new eight-story tower to serve as the nursing home.

In 2013, Gouverneur Health received accreditation as a "Level 3" Patient-Centered Medical Home from the National Committee for Quality Assurance, the highest accreditation possible.

== Photo gallery ==
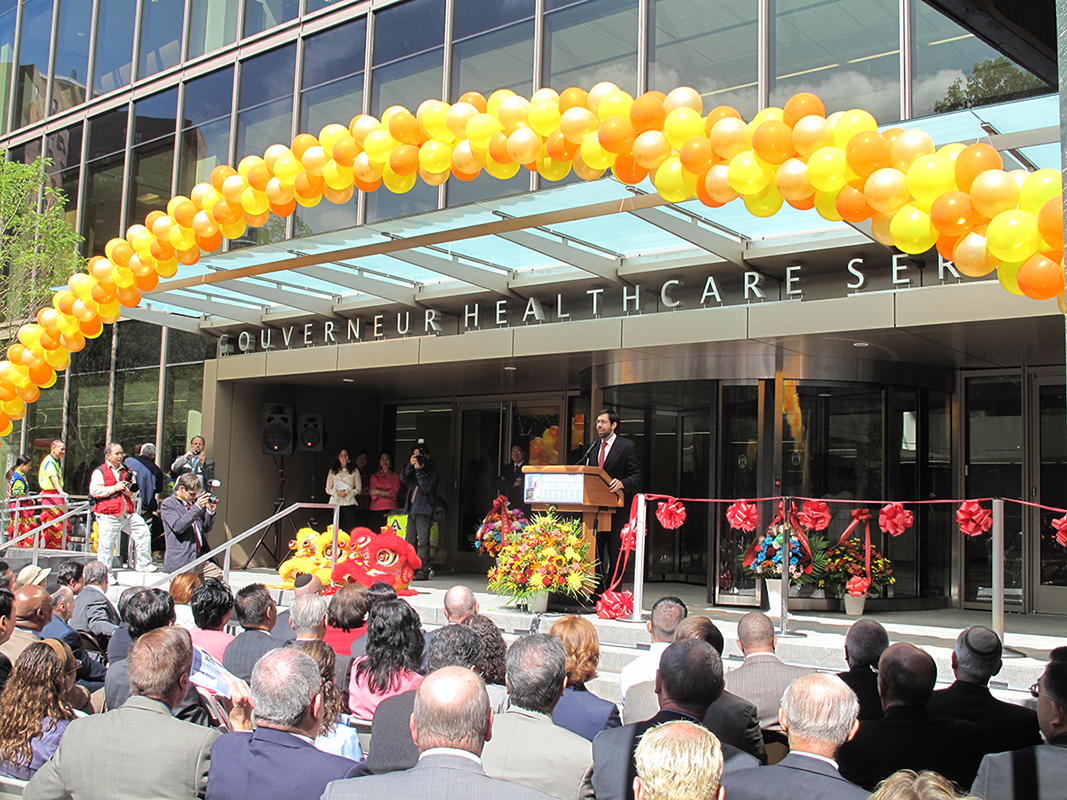
Grand opening ceremony, 2011

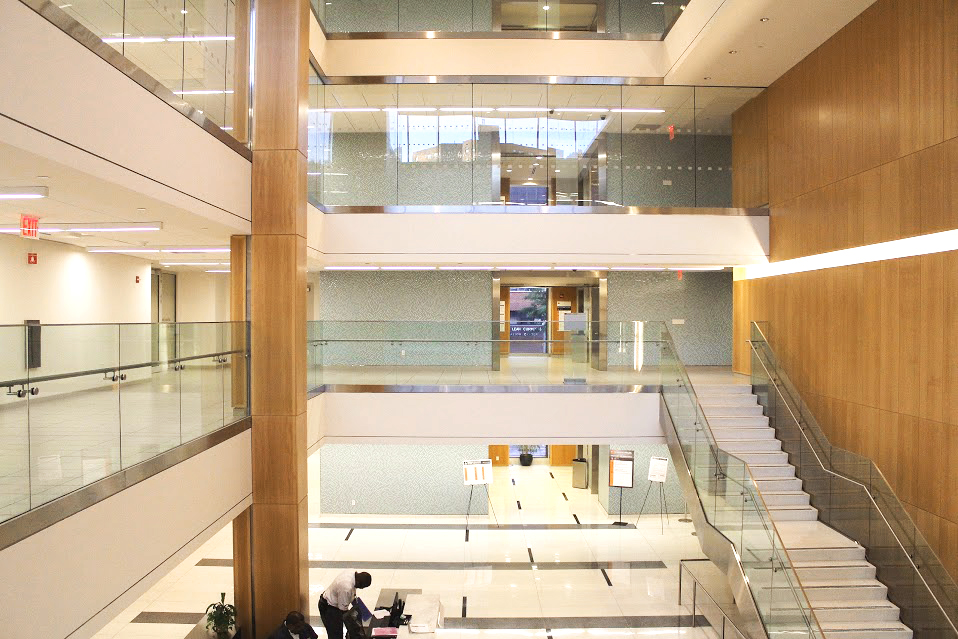
Second floor lobby

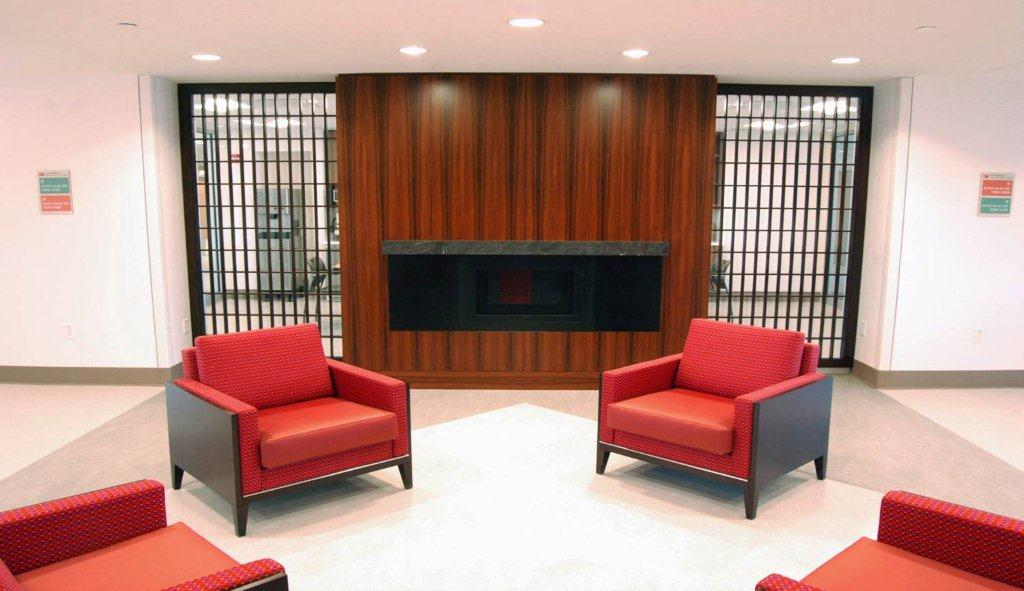
Nursing facility patient lounge

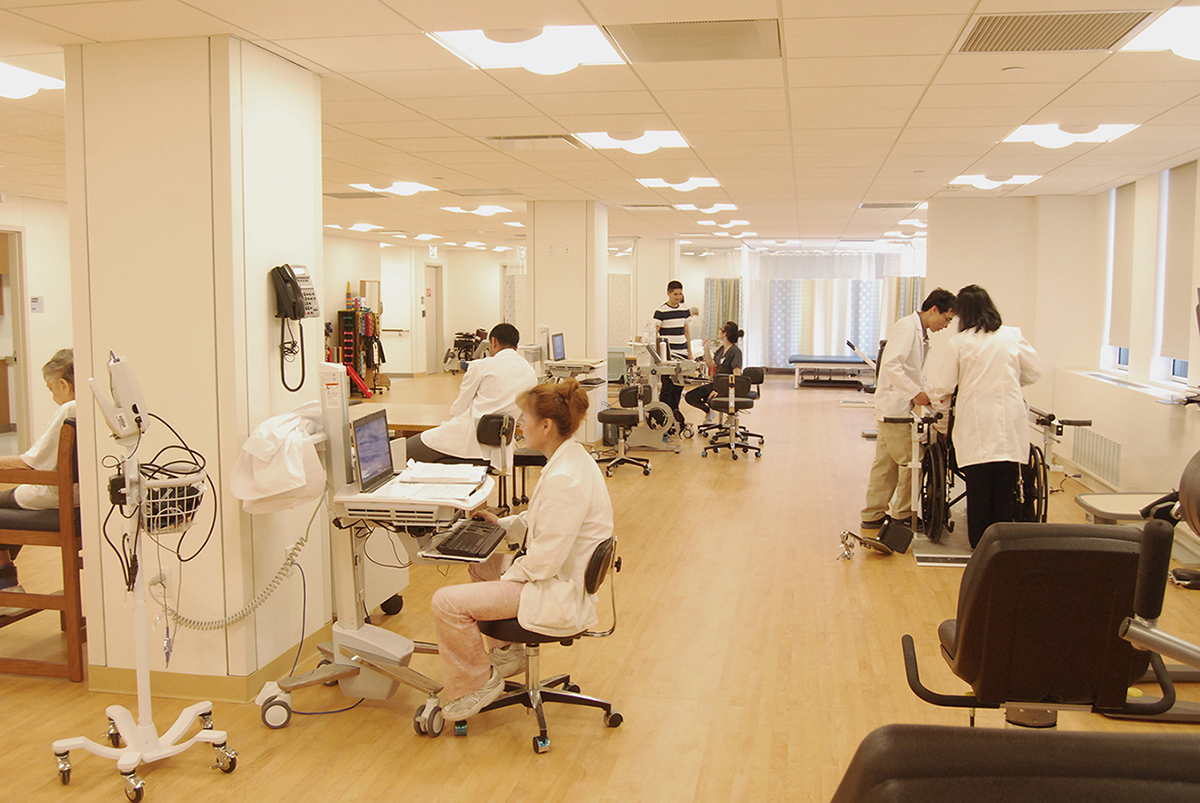
Rehabilitation gym

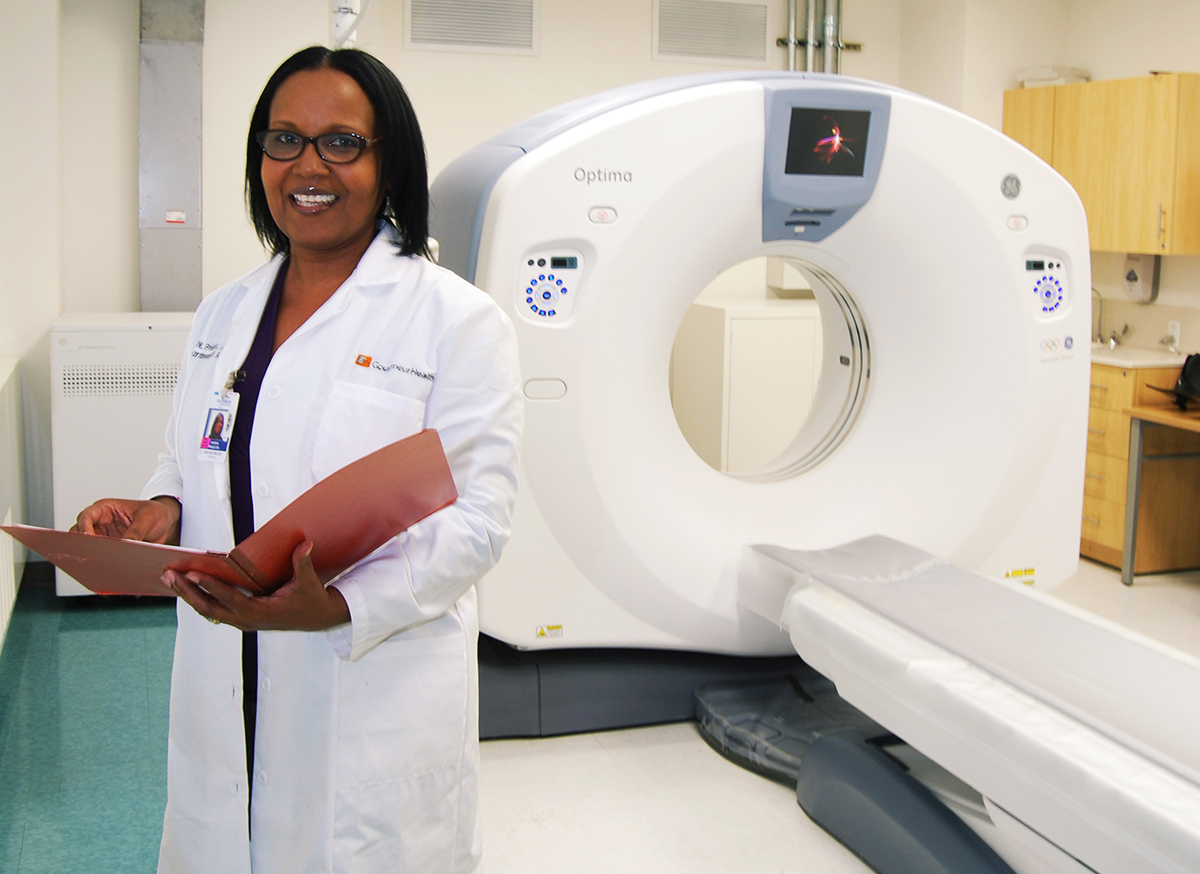
CT scan
