= Letters from Three Lovers =

- Genre: Drama; Romance
- Written by: Ann Marcus; Jerome Kass
- Directed by: John Erman
- Starring: Martin Sheen; Belinda Montgomery; Ken Berry; Juliet Mills; June Allyson; Barry Sullivan
- Music by: Pete Rugolo
- Country of origin: United States
- Original language: English

Production
- Producers: Aaron Spelling; Leonard Goldberg
- Production location: 20th Century Fox Studios
- Cinematography: Tim Southcott
- Editor: Roland Gross
- Running time: 75 minutes
- Production company: Spelling-Goldberg Productions

Original release
- Network: ABC
- Release: October 3, 1973

Letters from Three Lovers is a 1973 made-for-television drama film directed by John Erman. An ABC Movie of the Week and a sequel to The Letters (1973), the film is co-produced by Aaron Spelling, written by Ann Marcus and stars Martin Sheen, Belinda Montgomery, Robert Sterling, June Allyson, Ken Berry and Juliet Mills, among others.

== Plot ==
A mailman (Henry Jones) speaks about three stories of lives completely changed by letters which were temporarily lost when the mail plane crashed. The first story is of Vincent (Martin Sheen), a Vietnam War veteran, whose wife, Angie (Belinda Montgomery) works at a bar. Vincent reveals to Angie that he has recently been fired and cannot afford marriage, nor can he invest in a garage with his friend Jesse. Even though Angie tells him that she loves him nonetheless, Vincent robs Al (James McCallion), Angie's strict boss, in a desperate rage. He is imprisoned, and Angie attempts to support him, but Vincent - ashamed - orders her not to visit him again, but he has difficulty forgetting about his fiancee. In a letter, Angie informs him that she still stands by his side, and that she was fired from the job, and has since moved away for a new job.

In the second story, set in a suburb 350 miles from Los Angeles, a wealthy older couple Joshua (Barry Sullivan) and Monica Brandon (June Allyson) do not seem invested in each other's lives anymore. The marriage suffered the sudden death of their 10-year-old son years earlier. When, one night, her husband does not show up in a restaurant in Los Angeles for dinner, Monica meets Bob Francis (Robert Sterling). They share a meal and have a great time, and end up in bed with each other. Monica and Bob promise each other to meet once a month in the same hotel, and to send a letter to the place if one cannot attend. The next month, Bob finds out that his business will send him to New York, not Los Angeles, meaning that they cannot meet. He sends a letter to the hotel, but it is delayed, leaving Monica stood up.

The final story involves middle class businessman Jack (Ken Berry), who was once a spontaneous guy, but is now criticized by colleague Sam (Lyle Waggoner) for having become a scrooge. He plans to marry a rich girl, and checks into an expensive hotel in Palm Beach to achieve his goal. Meanwhile, e secretary Donna (Ellen Weston), is invited to accompany her boss, Mr. Thompson (Dan Tobin), to Palm Beach. She is not able to come and instead sends her colleague Maggie (Juliet Mills). Work soon requires Thompson to leave, but he allows Maggie to take full usage of his hotel room, allowing her to have a short vacation as soon as she is done filing papers. She meets Jack and enjoys his attention so much that she pretends to come from money. After several dates Jack proposes to her. She promises to give him an answer the next morning, but he has left; she assumes he's discovered she is not wealthy. Jack, meanwhile, admits to Sam that he left because he feels that he is not good enough for her. In a letter, he reveals his fraud, but assures her that he loves her.

The mailman explains that all three letters arrived a year late. Vincent, who has since been released from prison, is desperately seeking Angie, when he receives her belated letter and learns her new address. A criminal named Wilson (Logan Ramsey) has offered him money to serve as a driver in a heist, but Vincent wants to visit Angie and refuses. Wilson, however, threatens to kill him if he does participate. During the heist, Vincent calls Angie to tell her he loves her. Wilson sees him in a telephone booth and thinks that he is warning the police, so shoots and kills him. Meanwhile, Monica is considering adopting a child with Joshua, when she suddenly receives Bob's letter. They meet, but she realizes that the passion is gone. She gladly returns to Joshua, and tells him how much she loves him. Finally, Maggie receives Jack's letter and coincidentally runs into him at work the same day. Jack fears that she hates him because of the letter, but Maggie assures him that she loves him even more.

== Cast ==
- June Allyson as Monica Brandon
- Ken Berry as Jack
- Juliet Mills as Maggie McCauley
- Belinda Montgomery as Angie Mason
- Martin Sheen as Vincent Manella
- Robert Sterling as Bob Francis
- Barry Sullivan as Josh Brandon
- Henry Jones as the mailman
- Lyle Waggoner as Sam
- Larry Rosenberg as Messenger
- Dan Tobin as Mr. Thompson
- Logan Ramsey as Wilson
- Lou Frizzell as Eddie
- James McCallion as Al
- Ellen Weston as Donna
- Kathrine Baumann as girl at pool
- June Dayton as Jeanne, Bob's secretary

== See also ==
- List of American films of 1973
