= New York City blackout of 1977 =

Major electricity blackout

- Date: July 13–14, 1977
- Location: New York City, U.S.
- Deaths: 4
- Injuries: 550+
- Arrests: 4,500

The New York City blackout of 1977 was an electricity blackout that affected most of New York City on July 13–14, 1977. The only unaffected neighborhoods in the city were in southern Queens (including neighborhoods of the Rockaways), which were part of the Long Island Lighting Company system, as well as the Pratt Institute campus in Brooklyn, and a few other large apartment and commercial complexes that operated their own power generators. The blackout was caused by a series of technical failures and damage caused by lightning, that combined with managed power reductions, caused a full system overload.

Unlike other blackouts that affected the region, namely the Northeast blackouts of 1965 and 2003, the 1977 blackout was confined to New York City and its immediate surrounding areas. The 1977 blackout also resulted in citywide looting and other criminal activity, including arson, unlike the 1965 and 2003 blackouts. A congressional study estimated that the cost of damages amounted to a little over $300 million (roughly equivalent to $1.5 billion in December 2023).

The blackout has had a lasting cultural legacy inspiring fiction, film and music. Notably the film Blackout was inspired by the blackout, and recounts the experience of multiple people during the blackout.

== Prelude ==
=== Lightning damage ===
The events leading up to the blackout began on July 13, 1977, at 8:34 p.m. EDT on Wednesday, with a lightning strike at Buchanan South, a substation on the Hudson River, tripping two circuit breakers in Buchanan, New York. The Buchanan South substation converted the 345,000 volts of electricity originating from the 900 MW Indian Point nuclear generating station to lower voltage for commercial use. A loose locking nut combined with a slow-acting upgrade cycle prevented the breaker from reclosing and allowing power to flow again.

A second lightning strike caused the loss of two 345 kV transmission lines, the subsequent reclose of only one of the lines, and the loss of power from the nuclear plant at Indian Point. As a result of the strikes, two other major transmission lines became overloaded. Per procedure, Consolidated Edison, the power provider for New York City and some of Westchester County, tried to bring a fast-start generating station online at 8:45 p.m. EDT; however, no one was operating the station, and the remote start failed. Other, staffed plants successfully started, but several had removed some of their turbines from service for routine maintenance and could not provide their rated load.

At 8:55 p.m., a third lightning strike hit Sprain Brook substation in Yonkers, which took out two additional critical transmission lines. Because the system design had prioritized protecting the already-isolated Indian Point plant, only the north–south line automatically returned to service. The poor design of Con Edison's control-room displays did not clearly display this fact to the operator at the time.

The second opening of a transmission line left Con Edison system disconnected from key generating stations across the Hudson river. Instead, their power flowed to cross-river lines in Newark or upstate New York and then turned towards New York City. The remaining lines into New York City could not carry this excess power without exceeding their long-term capacity limits.

=== Power reductions ===
Con Edison's control room operator recognized that the extant north–south lines could not maintain their existing loads for long and asked New York Power Pool (NYPP) operators in Guilderland to reduce transmission on the overloaded lines. Implicitly, the Con Edison operator meant that they should use the cross-river lines near Indian Point, because he did not realize that all of those circuits remained open following the 8:55 lightning strike. NYPP, who could see that the lines had tripped out of service, instead warned that a major interconnection to New Jersey Public Service Electric and Gas Company was also overloaded, and recommended shedding load. The two system operators repeatedly talked past each other without revealing the fundamental misunderstanding.

Meanwhile, problems at a local generator in the Con Edison East River facility required the power provider to reduce the plant's loading. As the Con Edison system's stability began to degrade, gas turbines at the Astoria plant could not synchronize with the system well enough to enter service. Each problem made an already dire situation worse.

At 9:08 p.m., Con Edison began shedding load via first, a 5% system-wide voltage reduction, and then an 8% reduction. But the load lost thereby was too little, too late.

At 9:19 p.m., the final interconnection to upstate New York at Leeds substation tripped due to thermal overload. The 345 kV conductors had heated and sagged excessively into an unidentified object on the ground. This trip in turn caused the 138 kV links with Long Island to overload, and the line west to New Jersey began to overload even higher than previously reported.

At 9:22 p.m., Long Island Lighting Company opened its 345 kV interconnection to Con Edison to reduce power that was flowing through its system and overloading 138 kV submarine cables between Long Island and Connecticut. While Long Island operators were securing permission from the Power Pool operators to open their 345 kV tie to New York City, phase shifters between New York City and New Jersey were adjusted to correct the heavy flows, and this reduced the loading on the 115 kV cables. The Long Island operators did not notice the drop in 115 kV cable loadings, however, and proceeded with opening their 345 kV tie to New York City.

At 9:24 p.m., the Con Edison operator tried and failed to manually shed load by dropping customers. Five minutes later, at 9:29 p.m., the 230 kV Goethals-Linden interconnection with New Jersey finally tripped, leaving the Con Edison system isolated from the outside world.

== Blackout ==
=== Power failure ===
Con Ed could not generate enough power within the city, and its system for automatically shedding load interacted poorly with the unusually high inductance of its buried transmission cables. Dropping large blocks of customers produced electric effects indistinguishable from a transient short inside the generation equipment. Just after 9:28 p.m., the biggest generator in New York City, the 990 MW Ravenswood Generating Unit No. 3 (also known as "Big Allis"), shut down to protect itself from an imagined short. When it shut down, the city could not avoid a blackout.

By 9:37 p.m., the entire Con Edison power system shut down, almost exactly an hour after the first lightning strike. By 10:26 p.m., operators started a restoration procedure. Power was not fully restored until late the following day. Among the outcomes of the blackout was the creation of detailed restoration procedures that are now well documented and used in operator training to reduce restoration time.

=== Crime ===
The blackout occurred when the city was facing a severe financial crisis and its residents were terrified by the Son of Sam murders. The nation as a whole, especially New York City, was suffering from a protracted economic downturn, and commentators have contrasted the event with the good-natured "Where Were You When the Lights Went Out?" atmosphere of 1965. Some pointed to the financial crisis as a root cause of the disorder; others noted the hot July weather, as the East Coast was in the middle of a brutal heat wave. Still others pointed out that the 1977 blackout came after businesses had closed and their owners had gone home, while in 1965, the blackout occurred in the late afternoon/early evening and many merchants were still at their properties. However, the 1977 looters continued their illegal activities into the daylight hours of the next day.

Looting and vandalism were widespread in New York City, hitting 31 neighborhoods. Possibly the hardest hit were Crown Heights, where 75 stores on a five-block stretch were looted and damaged, and Bushwick, where arson was rampant, with some 25 fires still burning the next morning. At one point, two blocks of Broadway in Brooklyn, which separates Bushwick from Bedford-Stuyvesant, were on fire. Thirty-five blocks of Broadway were destroyed: 134 stores looted, 45 of them also set ablaze. Thieves stole 50 new Pontiacs from a Bronx car dealership. In Brooklyn, youths were seen backing up cars to stores, tying ropes around the stores' grates, and using their cars to pull the grates away, then looting the stores. There were 550 police officers injured in the mayhem, and 4,500 looters were arrested.

Mayor Abe Beame spoke during the blackout about what citizens were up against during the blackout and what the costs would be.

We've seen our citizens subjected to violence, vandalism, theft, and discomfort. The Blackout has threatened our safety and has seriously impacted our economy. We've been needlessly subjected to a night of terror in many communities that have been wantonly looted and burned. The costs when finally tallied will be enormous.

During New York's 2003 blackout, The New York Times ran a description of the blackout of 1977:

Because of the power failure, LaGuardia and Kennedy airports were closed down for about eight hours, automobile tunnels were closed because of lack of ventilation, and 4,000 people had to be evacuated from the subway system. ConEd called the shutdown an "act of God," enraging Mayor Beame, who charged that the utility was guilty of "gross negligence."

In all, 1,616 stores were damaged in looting and rioting. A total of 1,037 fires were responded to, including 14 multiple-alarm fires. In the largest mass arrest in city history, 3,776 people were arrested. Many had to be stuffed into overcrowded cells, precinct basements and other makeshift holding pens. A congressional study estimated that the cost of damages amounted to a little over $300 million (roughly equivalent to $1.5 billion in December 2023).

In addition to the massive looting and violence that had accompanied it, there were four homicides. Three people died in the over a thousand fires set during the blackout, and in Brooklyn, a drugstore owner gunned down a man who was brandishing a crowbar at him while leading 30 youths past the store's security fence.

Because of the chaos and the police being focused elsewhere, crime unrelated to the blackout also occurred. Dominick Ciscone, a Brooklyn teenager and aspiring mobster, was shot in the neighborhood of Carroll Gardens while in the company of some friends. He died at the scene. Police investigated several people with whom he had ongoing disputes, but never identified any suspects. Police received anonymous tips in 1997, but the killing remains unsolved as of 2021.

=== Shea Stadium ===
Shea Stadium went dark at approximately 9:30 p.m., in the bottom of the sixth inning, with Lenny Randle at bat. The New York Mets were losing 2–1 against the Chicago Cubs. Jane Jarvis, Shea's organist and "Queen of Melody", played "Jingle Bells" and "White Christmas". The game was completed two months later on September 16, with the Cubs winning 5–2. The Yankees were on the road at Milwaukee; less than a week later, Yankee Stadium hosted the All-Star Game on Tuesday, July 19.

=== Return of power ===
It was not until the next morning that power began being restored to those areas affected. Around 7 a.m. on July 14, a section of Queens became the first area to get power back, followed shortly afterward by Lenox Hill, Manhattan; the neighboring Yorkville area on the Upper East Side of Manhattan, though, was one of the last areas to get power back that Thursday evening. By 1:45 p.m., service was restored to half of Con Edison's customers, mostly in Staten Island and Queens. It was not until 10:39 p.m. on July 14 that the entire city's power was back online.

For much of July 14, most of the television stations in New York City were off the air (as the areas where those TV stations were located were still without power for much of the day), although WCBS-TV (Channel 2) and WNBC-TV (Channel 4) did manage to stay on the air thanks to gas and diesel-fueled generators, resuming their broadcasts only 25 and 88 minutes after the blackout began, respectively. Although much of New York City was still without power, Belmont Park (a racetrack on the border of Queens and Nassau County in Elmont) did stage their scheduled racing program that afternoon in front of a relatively sparse crowd, as many thought racing would be cancelled that day due to the blackout.

== Legacy ==
=== Music ===
In late 1977, the Trammps released the song "The Night the Lights Went Out" to commemorate the electrical blackout.

The blackout is the subject of the 2022 song "Blackout77" by Crippled Black Phoenix.

David Bowie has stated the blackout was a possible influence on his 1977 song "Blackout", "I can't in all honesty say that it was the NY one, though it is entirely likely that that image locked itself in my head."

There is a popular story that during the blackout numerous looters stole DJ equipment from electronics stores, and this helped spark the hip hop genre—but, in addition to hip hop originating 4 years earlier in 1973, the only evidence is some speculation by two early DJs, DJ Disco Wiz and Curtis "Grandmaster Caz" Fisher, who made the suggestion in an interview for Jim Fricke and filmmaker Charlie Ahearn, who printed it in their book Yes Yes Y'all. Caz later expanded from speculation to mythology, saying in a Slate article and podcast that, when the power went out, he and Wiz were playing records, running their equipment from an outlet in a park. At first they thought the outage was local and caused by something they had done, but realized when they heard stores closing that it was citywide and took advantage of the community's vulnerability to steal a mixing board from a local business. "I went right to the place where I bought my first set of DJ equipment, and I went and got me a mixer out of there." However, most early DJs dismiss this story as inaccurate, with Afrika Bambaataa stating that “Blackout '77 got nothin' to do with hip-hop . . . Whoever came with that is talking a lot of BS.”

=== Complications ===
The blackout also caused complications for the producers of the film Superman, who were shooting in the area. Tom Mankiewicz wrote in his memoir that cinematographer Geoffrey Unsworth had attempted to draw power from a street light in order to get more light for the film, and mistakenly believed for months that this had caused the blackout.

The blackout took place at the start of a 9-day heat wave, which would begin on July 13 with temperatures reaching 93 °F (34 °C), and last until July 21 at 104 °F (40 °C), just two degrees off the all-time record high of 106 °F (41 °C), set on July 9, 1936, which occurred during the 1936 North American heat wave, part of the Dust Bowl.

The city was eventually given over $11 million by the Carter administration to pay for the damages of the blackout.

The outage would widely become considered the "lowest point" in the City's modern history, coming on the heels of it almost declaring municipal bankruptcy in 1975, and eventually witnessing continued rises in overall average crime rates, until, approximately, 1990, by which point they started falling almost every year until 2020.

Beame accused Con Edison of "gross negligence" but would eventually feel the effect himself. In the mayoral election that year, Beame finished third in the Democratic primary to Ed Koch and Mario Cuomo. Koch would go on to win the general election.

The operating entities in New York fully investigated the blackout, its related causes, and the operator actions. They implemented significant changes, which are still in effect today, to guard against a similar occurrence. Despite these safeguards, there was a blackout in August 2003, although this was caused by a power system failure as far away as Eastlake, Ohio.

On July 13, 2019, on the 42nd anniversary of the event, a Con Edison blackout occurred, affecting 73,000 people on Manhattan's West Side.

=== Film ===
The 1978 ensemble film Blackout concerns residents of a high rise who are terrorized by escaped convicts during the 1977 New York blackout.

The event is also mentioned in the 1997 science fiction comedy Men in Black, where it is said to have been caused by an alien playing a practical joke, and the 2003 Disney Channel movie The Cheetah Girls, in which a power outage at a talent show is compared to it.

The 2019 film The Wolf Hour is set in New York City during the summer of 1977. The climax of the film includes a portrayal of the blackout.

=== Television ===
The blackout was a real-world plot setting reference in the 2020 conspiracy action TV series Hunters. It was also included as plot reference in episode 4 of the baseball drama The Bronx Is Burning.

=== Fiction ===
Lee Child's short story High Heat (2013) is about sixteen year old Jack Reacher first time visiting New York during this blackout. Casey McQuiston’s book One Last Stop (2021) mentioned how the character Jane was stuck in the future by the cause of this blackout. Brian Selznick's illustrated novel Wonderstruck (as well as its film adaptation) ends with the main characters at the Queens Museum of Art at the onset of the 1977 blackout.

=== Video games ===
- In the 2005 video game The Warriors, the blackout is parodied during mission 4, though the game is set in 1979.
- In Metal Gear Solid V: The Phantom Pain, an endgame cassette tape reveals that the character Major Zero triggered the blackout to conceal his escape from New York following an attempt on his life.

== See also ==
- Brittle Power – 1982 book re-released after the September 11 attacks; it argues U.S. domestic energy infrastructure is very vulnerable to disruption
- List of incidents of civil unrest in the United States
- List of major power outages
