= Emily Barringer =

American ambulance surgeon (1876–1961)

Emily Dunning Barringer
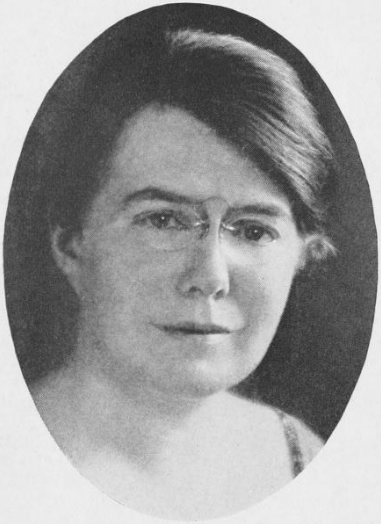
- Born: Emily Dunning; September 27, 1876; Scarsdale, New York, US
- Died: April 8, 1961 (aged 84); New Milford, Connecticut, US
- Education: Cornell University Weill Medical College
- Occupation: Physician-surgeon
- Years active: 1901 – c. 1954
- Medical career
- Field: Obstetrics and gynecology
- Institutions: Gouverneur Hospital, Kingston Avenue Hospital, New York Infirmary for Women and Children

Emily Dunning Barringer (September 27, 1876 – April 8, 1961) was the world's first female ambulance surgeon and the first woman to secure a surgical residency.

== Early life and education ==
Emily Dunning was born in Scarsdale, New York on September 27, 1876, to Edwin James Dunning and Frances Gore Lang. The well-to-do New York family fell on hard times when she was about ten years old, and her father left for Europe to try to recoup his fortune, leaving her mother with five children. When a well-meaning friend of Dunning's mother suggested that the girl might become a milliner's apprentice, her mother said "That settles the question. You are going to go to college." Dr. Mary Corinna Putnam Jacobi, a friend of the family, recommended Cornell University's medical preparatory course, and her uncle, Henry W. Sage, a founder of Cornell, agreed to pay her tuition. Other family friends also helped with expenses. Emily Dunning graduated in 1897 and decided to attend the College of Medicine of the New York Infirmary. During her sophomore year there, the college merged with the new Cornell University School of Medicine.

Despite earning her medical degree in 1901 and earning the second-highest grade on the qualifying exam, Gouverneur Hospital in New York City refused to give her an internship. The next year she applied again, this time with the support from political and religious figures, and the hospital accepted her—the first woman ever accepted for post-graduate surgical training in service to a hospital.

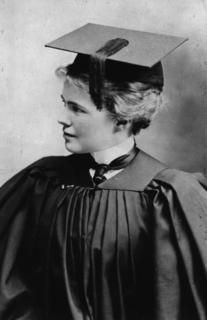
Barringer at her 1901 graduation

== Residency ==
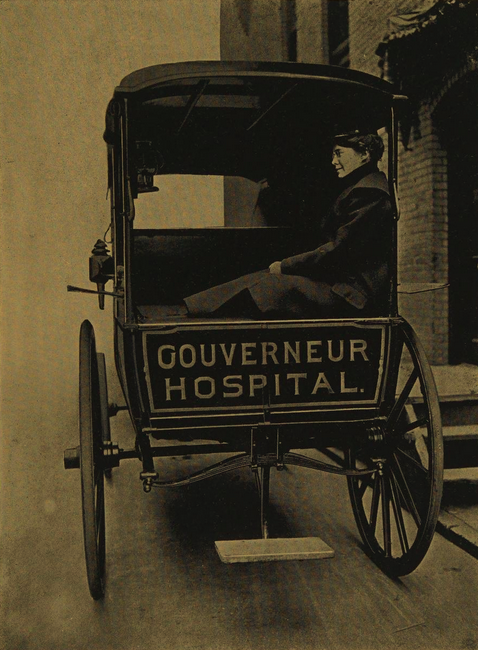
Emily Dunning Barringer as a resident at Gouverneur Hospital in New York City

"Barringer's fellow medical residents assigned her difficult "on call" schedules and ward duties, and harassed her in other ways," according to the Web site of the National Medical Library. She wrote about the harassment in her autobiography, which "illustrates the value of support from mentors, family, friends, nursing staff, and the public." As one of the first female doctors in her community, her presence was met with curiosity and press attention from local newspapers.

She married fellow physician Benjamin Barringer the day after completing her residency in 1904. The couple had two children, Benjamin Lang Barringer and Velona Barringer Steever.

During World War I, she served as vice-chair of the American Women's Hospitals War Service Committee of the National Medical Women's Association (later the American Medical Women's Association) and led a campaign to raise money for ambulances to be sent to Europe.

== Later career ==
After World War I, Barringer worked at several New York hospitals, including the New York Polyclinic Hospital, the New York Infirmary for Women and Children, Kingston Avenue Hospital in Brooklyn, and the Margaret Hague Maternity Hospital. She specialized in the study and treatment of venereal diseases and also held leadership positions at several of these hospitals.

Barringer was an advocate of women's suffrage and worked to improve medical education for women, public health, and reforms for the treatment of imprisoned women. She was President of the American Medical Women's Association in 1942. As co-chair of the association's War Service Committee, she organized the American Women's Hospital in Europe, which provided medical and surgical care during and after the war.

During World War II, Barringer advocated for the Army Medical Reserve Corps to commission female doctors. Barringer's lobbying efforts resulted in Congress passing the Sparkman Act in 1943, which allowed women to serve as commissioned officers in the Army Medical Reserve Corps, as well as the Navy and Public Health Service.

She later lived in Darien and New Canaan, Connecticut. She died at her son Benjamin's home in New Milford on April 8, 1961.

She was inducted into the Connecticut Women's Hall of Fame in 2000.

Her autobiography, Bowery to Bellevue: The Story of New York's First Woman Ambulance Surgeon, was made into a 1952 film, The Girl in White, by MGM.
