= Manhattan blackout of July 2019 =

Power outage in New York City

- Location of Manhattan within New York City
- Date: July 13, 2019
- Time: 6:47 p.m. EDT (22:47 UTC)
- Duration: ~5 hours
- Location: Manhattan, New York
- Type: Blackout
- Cause: Electric generator fire or transformer fire

The West Side of Manhattan in New York City experienced a power failure on July 13, 2019, at approximately 7 p.m. EDT. Con Edison is the energy utility serving the area, and they reported that approximately 73,000 customers were without power. Power was fully restored by midnight. The power failure occurred on the 42nd anniversary of the New York City blackout of 1977, which left nine million customers without power.

== Effects ==
The power outage commenced around 6:47 p.m. EDT, leaving 73,000 customers in Manhattan's West Side without power for about three hours. It affected six power sectors and encompassed an approximately 30-block area in Midtown Manhattan and the Upper West Side, from Times Square to 72nd Street, and from Fifth Avenue to the Hudson River.

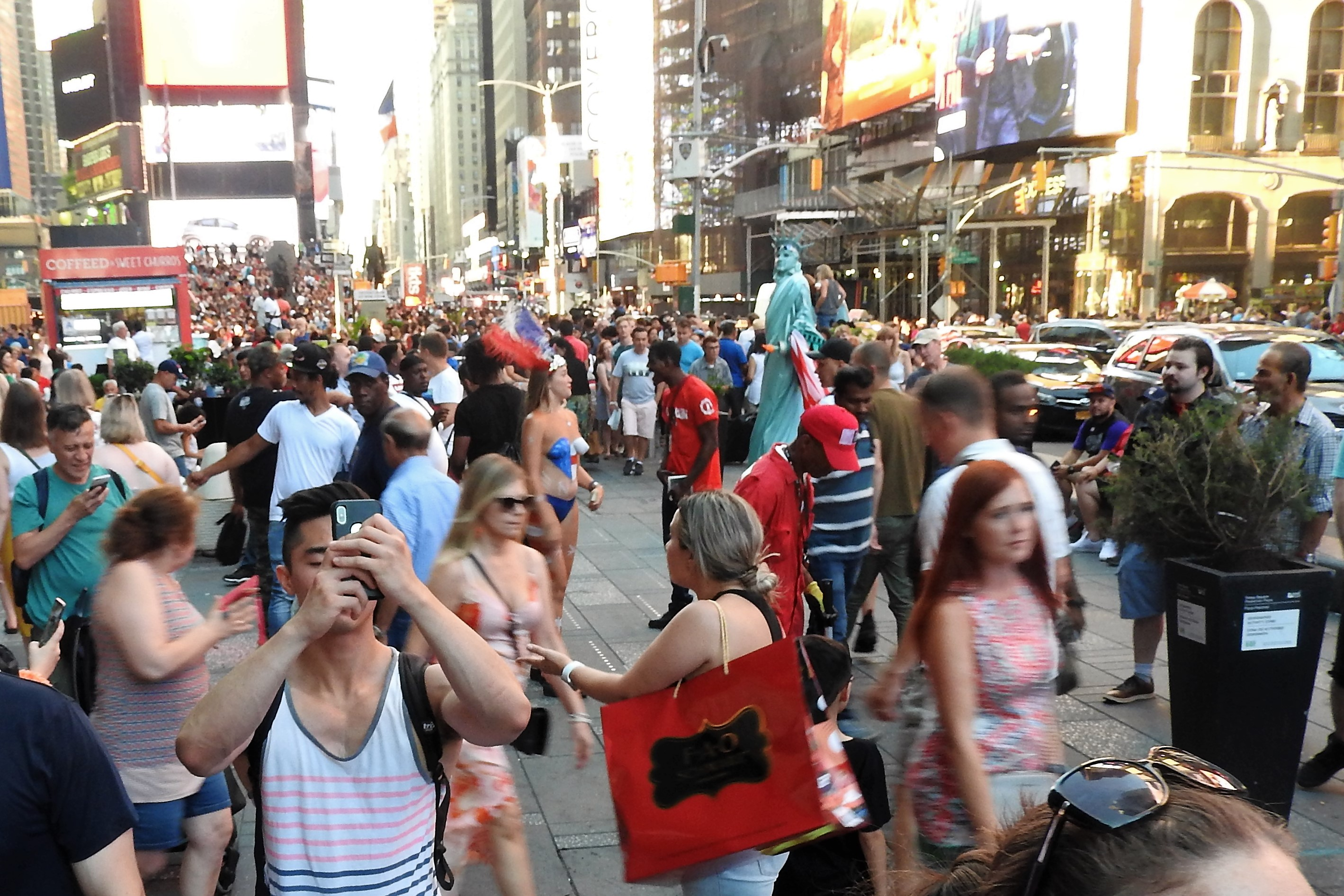
Crowds in Times Square during the blackout.

The Metropolitan Transportation Authority (MTA) reported that the entire New York City Subway system was affected by the outage. Some subway complexes were without lights, and service was affected on several routes. The MTA closed four Manhattan subway stations: 59th Street–Columbus Circle, Fifth Avenue/53rd Street, 34th Street–Hudson Yards, and 47th–50th Streets–Rockefeller Center. All of the subway's numbered routes suffered extensive delays. Limited service was available on the IRT Broadway–Seventh Avenue Line (1, 2, and 3 trains) on Manhattan's west side, the IRT Lexington Avenue Line (4, 5, 6 trains) on Manhattan's east side, and the IRT Flushing Line (7 train) between Manhattan and Queens. The MTA advised passengers to instead take buses in Manhattan.

Areas affected by the outage included Times Square, Rockefeller Center, Radio City Music Hall, and Broadway theatres. Most theaters on Broadway cancelled their shows for the evening; of the 30 shows running at the time, only the four playing on the east side of Broadway were able to perform. Performances at Carnegie Hall and Lincoln Center were also cancelled. However, some performers from the canceled shows entertained audiences on the sidewalks outside the theaters. The blackout also canceled a Jennifer Lopez concert at Madison Square Garden.

Firefighters worked to free numerous people trapped in elevators; about 750 of the 1,000 calls which the FDNY responded to were from those seeking assistance regarding elevators or fire alarms. Drivers were stuck in a traffic jam on the West Side Highway when the streetlights went out. According to the New York City Department of Transportation, over 200 traffic lights stopped functioning. Civilians and police officers helped to direct traffic. The roads were temporarily closed between 2nd Street and 71st Street between Fifth Avenue and the Hudson River in both directions. Police directed traffic in some areas, while at other locations such as Hell's Kitchen, pedestrians took on the task. New York Governor Andrew Cuomo brought in the New York National Guard to assist with traffic problems and safety issues.

== Causes ==
The outage was initially reported as being possibly due to a manhole explosion; the existence of the explosion was verified by New York State Assemblywoman Linda Rosenthal. The New York City Fire Department, New York City Police Department, and NYC Emergency Management agency were dispatched to 65th Street and West End Avenue in response to the incident.

In the early stages of the incident, Con Edison attributed the outage to a mechanical failure that it felt could be resolved relatively quickly, but did not give an estimate for when power would be restored.

By the end of the month, Con Edison released a statement on their findings, which determined that a flawed connection between sensors and protective relays at the 65th Street substation caused the relay protection system to fail to detect and isolate a faulted 13,000 volt distribution cable at West 64th Street and West End Avenue.

== Restoration of service ==
Around 10:00 p.m. EDT, July 13, 2019, power was partially restored to Times Square and Hell's Kitchen. By 10:30 p.m., five of the six electric networks were restored. Shortly before midnight, power was fully restored to all six sectors.

By 1:30 a.m. on July 14, 2019, multiple lanes between Fifth Avenue and the Hudson River were open. By 2:00 a.m., subway lines through Midtown Manhattan, namely the IND Eighth Avenue Line (A, C, and E trains), IND Sixth Avenue Line (D, F, M trains), and IRT lines (1, 2, 3, 4, 5, 6 and 7 trains), had resumed service in both directions.

== Aftermath ==
No injuries or fatalities were reported during the outage.

Governor Cuomo was critical of the power failure, calling it "unacceptable" due to the breadth of the outages, as well as in light of previous problems with power substations. He called for an investigation by New York's Department of Public Service to identify the cause of the outages, and "prevent an incident of this magnitude from happening again".

However, Cuomo praised the response of the city's population, saying via Twitter, "When things are at their worst, New Yorkers are at their best, and they were at their best tonight."

== See also ==
- List of major power outages
- New York City blackout of 1977 - occurred exactly 42 years before.
