= The Three Musketeers (1948 film) =

American action film by George Sidney

- Theatrical poster
- Directed by: George Sidney
- Screenplay by: Robert Ardrey
- Based on: The Three Musketeers; 1844 novel by Alexandre Dumas
- Produced by: Pandro S. Berman
- Starring: Gene Kelly; Van Heflin; June Allyson; Vincent Price; Lana Turner; Angela Lansbury
- Cinematography: Robert H. Planck
- Edited by: Robert J. Kern
- Music by: Herbert Stothart
- Production company: Metro-Goldwyn-Mayer
- Distributed by: Loew's, Inc.
- Release date: November 26, 1948
- Running time: 125 minutes
- Country: United States
- Language: English
- Budget: $4,474,000
- Box office: $8,412,000

The Three Musketeers is a 1948 film directed by George Sidney, written by Robert Ardrey, and starring Gene Kelly and Lana Turner. It is a Technicolor adventure film adaptation of the classic 1844 novel The Three Musketeers by Alexandre Dumas.

== Plot ==
D'Artagnan, an inexperienced Gascon youth, travels to Paris to join the elite King's Musketeers. On his way, he encounters a mysterious lady at a roadside inn. When he picks a fight with one of her escorts, she becomes suspicious and has him knocked unconscious. His letter of introduction from his father to de Treville, the commander of the Musketeers, is burned. When he awakens, he continues on to the city.

In Paris, he nevertheless presents himself to de Treville, who recognizes d'Artagnan's description of one of his assailants and makes him a cadet. The young Gascon spots the very man and in his haste to confront him, annoys three of the most skillful Musketeers: Athos, Porthos and Aramis. Each challenges him to a duel. Upon learning they are all at the appointed place to duel the same man, the swordsmen are amused. Before they can begin, however, they are interrupted by Richelieu's guards, who try to arrest the Musketeers. D'Artagnan joins them in dispatching their foes. As a result, he is welcomed into their ranks.

Later, d'Artagnan rescues (and falls in love with) Constance Bonacieux, a confidante of Queen Anne. The queen was given a matched set of twelve diamond studs by her husband, King Louis XIII. Foolishly, she gives them to her lover, the Duke of Buckingham, who is also the Prime Minister of Great Britain. Knowing of the queen's indiscretion, Richelieu sees a way to persuade the King to go to war with Britain. Richelieu arranges a ball and suggests to Louis that he have the Queen wear the diamonds.

D'Artagnan and his three friends volunteer to travel to Britain to retrieve the jewels, but along the way, they are ambushed by Richelieu's men. One by one, the Musketeers are forced to stay behind to hold off their pursuers. Finally, only d'Artagnan and his servant Planchet reach the Duke. However, Richelieu had already sent the beautiful Countess de Winter to steal two of the studs. The Duke's jeweler is able to make replacements quickly and d'Artagnan races back to France. He arrives just in time to save the Queen from disgrace.

Admiring d'Artagnan's resourcefulness, Richelieu has Constance abducted in an attempt to enlist him in his service. He also assigns de Winter to help persuade the young man. D'Artagnan tries to learn where Constance is being held from the countess, but begins to fall under her spell instead. When Athos discovers that de Winter is actually his treacherous wife, he tells d'Artagnan, but is not believed. Then d'Artagnan sees a brand on her shoulder, the mark of a common criminal, just as Athos had told him. D'Artagnan subsequently marries Constance.

Fighting breaks out between Britain and France. The Queen frees Constance and sends her to Buckingham for safety. When the war goes against him, Richelieu gives de Winter a carte blanche and sends her to Britain to assassinate his foe. The Musketeers learn of the plot and send Planchet to warn the Duke. Athos confronts Milady and recovers the carte blanche as proof of Richelieu's treachery. De Winter is imprisoned by the Duke and placed in Constance's custody. De Winter shows Constance her brand, indicating that she is a common criminal---de Winter tells Constance she fears she will be executed by the British. Constance, feeling sorry for de Winter, provides her with a knife to commit suicide but instead, de Winter uses the knife to kill Constance, then Buckingham.

D'Artagnan and Athos return to France to bring de Winter to justice. De Treville warns the Musketeers that she is under Richelieu's protection.

Aramis recalls a conversation between her and Richelieu concerning the granting of a title and an estate near Lille. Caught at the estate, Athos's ancestral home, she begs for mercy, but finds none, even though her husband still loves her. Seeing no escape, she walks with dignity to her execution. The Musketeers are captured by Richelieu's men and returned to the royal court for judgment.

As Richelieu is about to have them sentenced to death, d'Artagnan produces the carte blanche. Richelieu is compelled to recommend to King Louis that he grant Aramis's wish to enter a monastery; Porthos, an introduction to a rich widow; Athos, the restoration of his title and lands; and d'Artagnan, a commission as a Musketeer and a mission to England, for "the English lead too dull a life." The four depart triumphantly.

== Cast ==
- Lana Turner as Milady, Countess de Winter
- Gene Kelly as d'Artagnan
- June Allyson as Constance Bonacieux
- Van Heflin as Athos
- Angela Lansbury as Queen Anne
- Frank Morgan as King Louis XIII
- Vincent Price as Richelieu. (Not wanting to risk offending Roman Catholics, MGM ensured that the character was never referred to as a cardinal.)
- Keenan Wynn as Planchet
- John Sutton as the Duke of Buckingham
- Gig Young as Porthos
- Robert Coote as Aramis
- Reginald Owen as Treville
- Sol Gorss as Jussac, an officer in Richelieu's Guards (uncredited)
- Ian Keith as Rochefort, Richelieu's chief henchman. (Keith reprised his role as Rochefort from the 1935 version.)
- Patricia Medina as Kitty, Lady de Winter's maid
- Richard Stapley as Albert
- Byron Foulger as Bonacieux (uncredited)
- Marie Windsor as Lady-in-Waiting (uncredited)
- Paul Newlan as Musketeer Guard (uncredited)
- Gil Perkins as Felton (uncredited)
- Dick Simmons as Count de Wardes (uncredited)
- Robert Warwick as d'Artagnan Sr. (uncredited)
- Alberto Morin as Bazin (uncredited)

== Production ==
In mid-1947, it was announced Metro-Goldwyn-Mayer was set to produce a film adaptation of The Three Musketeers. Initially, Louis Hayward showed interest in playing d'Artagnan in a film adaptation by Edward Small, but he withdrew when he found out The Three Musketeers was already being produced by MGM.

=== Casting ===
Despite rumors Douglas Fairbanks Jr. was set to star, Gene Kelly was announced as the film's lead in June 1947, with production slated to begin in September. A week later, Keenan Wynn was confirmed to play a co-starring role. Shortly after, Van Heflin and William Powell were revealed to be in negotiations for the title roles. In October, Kelly broke his ankle, forcing him to give up the leading role in Easter Parade (1948), and delaying the start of filming. Though Kelly's ankle had mended sufficiently to begin shooting in January, 1948, his elaborate fencing scenes required more healing time, and were pushed back to the end of filming.

To appear as Lady de Winter, Lana Turner had to relinquish her role in an unfinished project called Bedeviled. In January 1948, news items reported Turner withdrew from The Three Musketeers. Initially, she had permission to withdraw from Louis B. Mayer, because she had been very busy shooting the films Green Dolphin Street (1947), Cass Timberlane (1947), and Homecoming (1948). However, she was later put on suspension and Alida Valli was considered as her replacement. Eventually, she agreed to make the film, and it sparked her first film in color. Sidney admitted Turner did not "want to do it at all. She got into it and she enjoyed it. She was just wonderful in the part. People thought making The Three Musketeers was ridiculous but it worked."

Before June Allyson was cast in the remaining female lead, Deborah Kerr was offered the role in November 1947.

While the work was in the public domain in the US and Britain there was some doubt whether this was the case in some European countries, causing MGM much concern.

Footage from The Three Musketeers appears in the film Singin' in the Rain. It was used as part of the Lockwood/Lamont film The Royal Rascal.

=== Shooting ===
Director George Sidney said he approached the film as "a Western with costumes... I didn't approach it as a classic. The dueling was pure choreography and the fights are pure Western stuff."

The big dueling scene was shot in Busch Gardens in Pasadena. Sidney said "we shot on the back lot, in a public park, on golf courses."

"Lana Turner and I played complicated practical jokes on each other during the making of The Three Musketeers," Vincent Price said. "Finally Gene Kelly yelled at us to stop it. But we didn’t."

== Release ==
The film was very successful, earning MGM's second highest gross of the 1940s, even though its large production budget minimised profits. According to MGM accounts it made $4,124,000 in the US and Canada and $4,288,000 elsewhere, recording a profit of $1,828,000. It was one of the most popular films of 1948.

== Accolades ==
Robert Planck was nominated for an Oscar for Best Cinematography (Color) for the 21st Academy Awards. He lost to Joseph Valentine, William V. Skall and Winton C. Hoch for their work on Joan of Arc.

The Three Musketeers were nominated for the American Film Institute's 2003 list AFI's 100 Years...100 Heroes & Villains as heroes.
