= List of major power outages =

This is a list of notable wide-scale power outages. To be included, the power outage must conform to all of the following criteria:

- The outage must not have been a rolling blackout, or planned by the service provider.
- The outage must affect at least 1,000 people.
- The outage must last at least one hour.
- There must be at least 1,000,000 person-hours of disruption.

For example:

- 1,000 people affected for 1,000 hours (42 days) or more would be included; fewer than 1,000 people would not be, regardless of duration.
- One million people affected for a minimum of one hour would be included; if the duration were less than one hour, it would not, regardless of number of people.
- 10,000 people affected for 100 hours, or 100,000 for 10 hours would be included.

== Largest by number of people affected ==
Article	People affected (millions)	Population affected (%)	Location	Date	Duration (days)	References
2012 India blackouts	620		India	July 30–31, 2012	2	
2023 Pakistan blackout	244	99	Pakistan	January 23, 2023	1	
2001 India blackout	230		India	January 2, 2001	1	
2022 Bangladesh blackout	140	80	Bangladesh	October 4, 2022	1	
2021 Pakistan blackout	200	90	Pakistan	January 9, 2021	1	
2014 Bangladesh blackout	150	85	Bangladesh	November 1, 2014	1	
2015 Pakistan blackout	140		Pakistan	January 26, 2015	1	
2019 Java blackout	120		Indonesia	August 4–5, 2019	2	
2005 Java–Bali blackout	100		Indonesia	August 18, 2005	1	
1999 Southern Brazil blackout	97		Brazil	March 11–June 22, 1999	104	
2015 Turkey blackout	70		Turkey	March 31, 2015	1	
2009 Brazil and Paraguay blackout	60		Brazil, Paraguay	November 10–20, 2009	11	
2003 Italy blackout	56		Italy, Switzerland	September 28, 2003	1	
Northeast blackout of 2003	55		Canada, United States	August 14–16, 2003	3	
2025 Iberian Peninsula blackout	55		Spain, Portugal, France, Andorra	April 28–30, 2025	3	
2019 Argentina, Paraguay and Uruguay blackout	48		Argentina, Paraguay, Uruguay	June 16, 2019	1	
2002 Luzon blackout	40		Philippines	May 21, 2002	1	
2001 Luzon blackout	35		Philippines	April 7, 2001	1	
Northeast blackout of 1965	30		Canada, United States	November 9, 1965	1	
2019 Venezuelan blackouts	30		Venezuela	March 7, 2019–July 23, 2019	139	
2020 Sri Lankan blackouts	21		Sri Lanka	August 17, 2020	1	
2016 Sri Lanka blackout	21		Sri Lanka	March 13, 2016	1	
2025 Chile blackout	18		Chile	February 25-26, 2025	2	

== Biggest by impact in person-hours ==
This method is a formula that multiplies the number of hours by the population affected, and does not reflect the nominal time in hours that the outages lasted.

Article	People affected (millions)	Location	Length (in customer-hours)	References
2013 Philippines blackouts	6.7	Philippines	6.3 billion hours	
November-December 2025 Aceh blackouts	5.6	Aceh, Indonesia	4.8 billion hours	
2017 Puerto Rico blackouts	1.5	Puerto Rico	3.4 billion hours	
2019 Venezuelan blackouts	30	Venezuela	>3.3 billion hours	

== Chronology ==
=== 1960s ===
==== 1962 ====
- January 23—Sweden—Approximately 50,000 people in the city of Södertälje lost power for at least four hours, with some without power for over 20 hours, after an explosion at the substation supplying the city. A 70 kV circuit breaker exploded at a routine switching operation, the oil mist released from the damaged breaker caused a bigger explosion that demolished the whole upper floor of the substation building which contained the 70 kV switchgear. Emergency repairs were delayed because all transformers in the substation were more or less damaged.

==== 1965 ====
- November 9—United States and Canada—The Northeast blackout of 1965 affected portions of seven northeastern U.S. states (including New York) and Ontario. Most radio and television stations within the area were without power or teletype communications during the entirety of the blackout.

==== 1969 ====
- August 5—United States—A 50-mile (80 km) stretch of Florida's Gold Coast was hit with a general power failure after an explosion at the Cutler Ridge facility. The outage affected more than 2 million people, and created a vast traffic jam. Miami and Fort Lauderdale downtown areas were offline for almost two hours, with other areas dark for much longer periods.

=== 1970s ===
==== 1971 ====
- February 7—United States—On that evening, power in parts of the New York City borough of Manhattan was lost for over four hours. The power outage was originally thought to have been caused by an explosion at Con Ed's Waterside power facility on 40th Street and 1st Avenue in Manhattan, but the cause was later suspected to be a result of a fault in a transformer at a substation on 13th Street. New York City television and FM radio stations that transmitted from the Empire State Building were off the air. Most AM radio stations were largely unaffected, as most of their transmitters were located in either Northern New Jersey or on High Island in the Bronx, neither location having been affected by the blackout; several Manhattan AM station studios, however, were affected due to power generator lack. Several lines of the IND and IRT subway lines were affected, stranding passengers. Grand Central Terminal lost power in the building itself, but power on the tracks was retained because it ran on direct current. The New York Daily News was also affected when the blackout caused their printing facility to halt operations.

==== 1973 ====
- January 14—Sweden—Approximately 25,000 people in the city of Härnösand and nearby countryside suffered a power failure of up to 40 hours after a fire and explosion in the underground substation at Murberget. The cause of the fire could not be determined but there are at least two plausible theories. One theory says that a 6 kV underground cable was shorted and caught fire outside the station, the fault was never switched off because the DC supply for the protective relays was not working for some reason, the fire spread to other cables and inside the station where soot and smoke caused busbar shorts and arc explosions. The other theory also says that it was initiated by a short in an outgoing 6 kV cable but a malfunctioning protective relay caused a breaker to reclose against the short several times until it exploded. In the aftermath, recruits from the Härnösand Coastal Artillery Regiment were engaged in cleaning up the usable parts of the substation which caused criticism as the recruits had been subjected to carcinogenic debris, strong solvents and possibly residues of PCB or dioxins, with neither knowledge, training nor sufficient protection.

==== 1976 ====
- July 4—United States—A major power failure affected most of Utah and parts of Wyoming for 1.5 to 6 hours.

==== 1977 ====
- May 10—Romania—A nationwide blackout that lasted 5 hours caused US$1 billion losses, larger than the Vrancea earthquake on March 4. Subsequent investigations showed it was caused by human error.
- May 17—United States—Parts of South Florida were blacked out as a result of a malfunctioning relay caused the Turkey Point Nuclear Generating Station in Miami to go offline.
- July 13–14—United States—In New York City, 9 million people were affected by a power outage, resulting from a set of lightning strikes on power lines. Con Edison’s system then collapsed from a combination of natural events, equipment malfunctions, questionable system design features and operating errors, according to the U.S. FERC, severing the last power connection between New York City and the Northwest. New York was without water or power for a two-night period of around 26 hours. The power outage alone cost over $350 million. In 24-26 hours, an urban crisis emerged. More than 1,000 fires were set – 60 of them major. Nearly 2,000 properties were vandalized, two people died, 436 police officers were injured, widespread looting with near-to 5,000 arrests for related crimes, and 6 inmates escaped from Rikers Island. In the areas hit worst by the looting and vandalism, the vast amount of refuse, garbage and spoiled food required the addition of 82 sanitation trucks and 4,000 workers to cope with the clean-up operation. 911 phone service and some radio stations remained at least partially available.
- September 20—Canada—A power outage covered almost the entire province of Quebec, affecting two million people, after a failure at the Montagnais Substation along a series of 735 kV transmission lines connecting to the Churchill Falls Generating Station in Labrador. Power was restored to scattered rural areas within an hour and service was brought back to parts of Montreal and Quebec City within two hours; it took several hours to fully restore power.

==== 1978 ====
- December 19—France—A power line overload caused a 4 hour outage in the French mainland.

=== 1980s ===
==== 1981 ====
- January 8—United States—Prisoners on a work assignment burning trash and debris at the Utah State Prison in Draper, accidentally caused a major power failure when something they were burning exploded, causing a fireball that shorted out transmission lines above them. 1.5 million people lost power, in almost all of Utah, as well as parts of southeastern Idaho and southwestern Wyoming.

==== 1982 ====
- December 22—United States—A transmission tower near Tracy, California collapsed onto an adjacent tower bringing down two 500-kV lines and a pair of 230-kV lines that passed underneath the 500-kV right of way. Total loss of 12,530 MW affected approximately five million people on the west coast.

==== 1983 ====
- December 27—Sweden—Two-thirds of the country's network was shut down when a single component in a switching station failed, causing a short circuit in a transformer. This affected about 4.5 million people in the more densely populated southern half.

==== 1985 ====
- May 17—United States—Most of South Florida was blacked out after a brush fire in the Everglades damaged overhead transmission lines. Miami, Fort Lauderdale, West Palm Beach, and the Florida Keys lost power for about 3.5 hours. About 4.5 million people were affected.

==== 1987 ====
- October 16—United Kingdom—The Great Storm of 1987 interrupted the High-Voltage Cross-Channel Link between the UK and France. The storm caused a domino effect of power outages throughout South East England.

==== 1989 ====
- March 13—Canada—The March 1989 geomagnetic storm caused the Hydro-Québec power failure which left seven million people in Quebec without power for over nine hours.
- October 17—United States—The 1989 Loma Prieta earthquake knocked out power to about 1.4 million customers in Northern California, mainly due to damaged electrical substations.

=== 1990s ===
==== 1991 ====
- July 7—United States and Canada—A powerful wind storm affected a large portion of central North America and caused power outages for about one million customers from Iowa to Ontario.

==== 1992 ====
- August 24—United States—As Hurricane Andrew passed over the northern Florida Keys it downed 17 miles (27 km) of power lines, breaking the wooden poles they were strung on, along a path that was in four feet (122 cm) of water, stretching from the Turkey Point Nuclear Plant southward to the upper Keys. The shallow depth prevented the use of large construction barge cranes for rebuilding the power pylons but the water was too deep for land-based construction vehicles. As a result, the Upper and Middle Keys were largely without power for several months as the Middle Keys Electric Co-op only had generating capacity for 10% of its demand. The power lines heading north to Miami were restored much more quickly, as they were strung along the side of US Highway 1 on dry land. Key West power was in the process of decommissioning an end-of-life oil-fired plant and was able to restore 75% generating capacity for the lower keys in one day as there was no storm damage that far south. Key West power was in the process of converting to sourcing 100% of its electricity from the Turkey Point facility.

==== 1995 ====
- October 4—United States and Canada—Hurricane Opal, which killed at least 59 people, knocked out power to over two million customers across eastern and southern North America.

==== 1996 ====
- July 2–3—United States, Canada and Mexico—Two million people lost power due to a transmission line overheating (the temperature was around 38 °C/100 °F) in Idaho and a 230-kV line between Montana and Idaho tripping. Some customers were without power for minutes, while others were without for hours.
- August 10—United States and Mexico—the Western Intertie buckled under the high summer heat of the 1996 Western North America blackouts, causing a cascading power failure affecting nine western U.S. states and parts of Mexico. Four million people were affected. Power was out in some locations for four days.
- November 19—United States—A severe ice storm affected the region around Spokane, Washington and Coeur d'Alene, Idaho causing power outages lasting up to two weeks.

==== 1998 ====
- January—United States and Canada—The North American Ice Storm of 1998 caused prolonged blackouts in northeastern North America, particularly in Quebec, where many transmission towers were destroyed by ice. Over 3.5 million customers in total lost power during the event.
- January 3—Philippines—A broken power line caused by a falling Meralco utility post in Laguna led to a power interruption that affected the entire island of Luzon for almost 7 hours.
- February 19–March 27—New Zealand—The 1998 Auckland power crisis resulted in the entire Central Business District of Auckland being without power for several weeks, after a line failure caused a chain reaction leading to the failure of three other lines.
- May 31—United States and Canada—A powerful wind storm caused a power outage for nearly two million customers across much of central North America.
- September 7—United States—A series of widespread derechos in the Northeast (the Labor Day Derechos) caused a power outage for hundreds of thousands of customers for several days.
- December 8—United States—In the San Francisco area, over 350,000 customers (buildings) or 940,000 people were affected by an outage caused when the Pacific Gas and Electric Company placed a San Mateo sub-station online at 8:17 am PST, while the station was still grounded following maintenance. This drew so much power from the transmission lines on the San Francisco Peninsula that 25 other sub-stations in the city automatically and immediately shut down. Power was not fully restored until almost 4:00 pm PST the same day. Economic costs were estimated in tens of millions of dollars.

==== 1999 ====
- March 11–June 22—Brazil—The 1999 Southern Brazil blackout was a widespread power outage (the largest ever at the time) that involved São Paulo, Rio de Janeiro, Minas Gerais, Goiás, Mato Grosso, Mato Grosso do Sul and Rio Grande do Sul. An estimated 75 to 97 million people were without electricity or with severely limited access to electricity. The blackout lasted 103 days. A chain reaction was started when a lightning strike occurred at 22h 16m at an electricity substation in Bauru, São Paulo State, causing most of the 440 kV circuits at the substation to trip. With few routes for the power to flow from the generating stations via the 440 kV system (a very important system to São Paulo, carrying electricity generated by the Paraná River) a lot of generators automatically shut down because they did not have any load. The world's biggest power plant at the time, Itaipu, tried to support the load that was no longer being supplied by the 440 kV power plants, but the 750 kV AC lines and the 600 kV DC lines that connected the plant to the rest of the system could not take the load and tripped too. In Rio, the military police placed 1,200 men in the streets to avoid looting. In São Paulo, traffic authorities announced they closed the city's tunnels to prevent robberies. More than 60,000 people were on Rio's subway when lights went out. At midnight, power began returning to some areas, with power fully restored on June 22.
- July 5—United States and Canada—the Boundary Waters–Canadian derecho cut power to over 600,000 homes in Quebec with additional outages in New England and in the Upper Great Lakes region.
- July 29—Taiwan—The No. 326 transmission tower collapsed due to a landslide, disconnecting around 8.46 million electricity consumers.
- December 26–28—France—Cyclone Lothar and Martin left 3.4 million customers without electricity, and forced Électricité de France to acquire all the available portable power generators in Europe, with some even brought in from Canada. These storms brought a fourth of France's high-tension transmission lines down and 300 high-voltage transmission pylons were toppled. It was described as one of the greatest energy disruptions ever experienced by a modern developed country.

=== 2000s ===
==== 2000 ====
- May 9—Portugal—A major power outage left the entire southern half of the country, including Lisbon, without power for a few hours. The blackout occurred shortly after 10 pm local time. The o apagão da cegonha (translated as "the super outage of the stork"), suddenly plunged Lisbon in complete darkness. Stalled commuter trains and traffic light failures wreaked some havoc in the streets. Security was immediately reinforced in the city, but no rise in criminal activity was registered. Energias de Portugal, the main electricity operator, later reported that the blackout was due to the electrocution of a stork, which landed "on the wrong place at the wrong time" on a line near Lavos, causing a fire in the Rio Maior substation.
- United States—During the 12-month California electricity crisis of 2000–01, there were regular power failures due to energy shortages.
- October 20—Philippines—A massive power outage affected most of Luzon including Metro Manila, caused by system failures in the transmission lines of the National Power Corporation in Pangasinan and Bulacan; electricity was fully restored 16 hours later.

==== 2001 ====
- January 2—India—A fault in the transmission system in the state of Uttar Pradesh led to cascading failure throughout North India.
- May 20-August 28—Iran—A problem at a power substation caused a major blackout. Outages were reported in Tehran and at least six provincial capitals: Isfahan, Shiraz, Tabriz, Kermanshah, Qazvin, and Hamadan.

==== 2002 ====
- January 30—United States—A major ice storm hit Kansas City, Missouri, knocking trees into power lines and blowing up transformers throughout the city. The outage affected more than 270,000 people.
- March 12—Indonesia—A power failure affected 13 million people in South Sumatra and Lampung.
- July 13—Azerbaijan—Baku and nearly the entirety of the country experienced a blackout due to unknown causes.
- April 30—United States—Nearly all of JEA's 355,000 customers in Jacksonville, Florida, lost power.

==== 2003 ====
- July 22—United States—A severe wind storm disrupted power to over 300,000 customers in the Memphis, Tennessee, metropolitan area.
- August 14–16—United States and Canada—The Northeast blackout of 2003, a wide-area power failure in the northeastern US and central Canada, affected over 55 million people, 14 days fully restored.
- September 2—Malaysia—The 2003 southern Malaysia blackout resulted when a power failure affected five states (out of 13), including the capital Kuala Lumpur, for five hours, starting at 10:00 am local time.
- September 23—Denmark and Sweden—A power failure affected five million people in east Denmark and southern Sweden. The blackout started when Unit 3 of Oskarshamn Nuclear Power Plant shut down due to mechanical problems, resulting in 1,175 MW of generation loss. While capacity was restored from elsewhere in the grid, a double busbar failure occurred in a 440kV substation, leading to decoupling of a key transmission link between central and southern Sweden. Eventually frequency and voltage collapsed and by 12.37 pm the network collapsed. One power plant in Denmark sustained permanent damage and could not be reactivated during power restoration.
- September 28—Italy—The 2003 Italy blackout affected the entire country except Sardinia, cutting service to more than 56 million people.

==== 2004 ====
- July 12—Greece—Two power plants in Lavrio and Megalopolis shut down due to malfunction within 12 hours of each other during a period of high demand due to a heat wave. That led to a cascading failure causing the collapse of the entire Southern (Power) System, affecting several million people in southern Greece.

==== 2005 ====
- January—Brazil—A cyber attack disrupted power service in three cities north of Rio de Janeiro, affecting tens of thousands of people.
- May 25–August 3—Russia—The 2005 Moscow power blackouts affected more than two million people in central Russia. The blackout was due to a cascading failure of the power grid started by a transformer failure. Some lines of the Moscow Metro lost power, stranding people in trains. Full restoration of power took 10 weeks.
- August 29–Sept 2—United States—Hurricane Katrina caused widespread power outages in New Orleans and also throughout Louisiana, Mississippi, Alabama, Florida, Kentucky, and Tennessee. Almost 3 million customers were without phone service in the days after landfall. In New Orleans, virtually every major means of communication was disrupted by the “hurricane and the extensive flooding from the breached levees”.

==== 2006 ====
- August 1—Canada—In the Laurentians of Québec, a large number (146,000, at its peak in the evening) of households were left without electricity for a whole day, and some for up to a week, due to intense thunderstorms that rolled through southern Quebec, including the greater Montreal area. Over 450,000 customers in total were affected.
- August 2—Canada—Nearly a quarter million customers of Hydro One lost power after severe thunderstorms that included tornadoes and damaging wind ripped through southern and eastern Ontario.
- August 14—Japan—A floating crane hit and broke a transmission line across the Edo River, interrupting power to 1,391,000 customers in the Tokyo Metropolitan Area, including Tokyo, Yokohama, and part of Kawasaki and Ichikawa. Power was restored to all but 15,000 customers within an hour. Full restoration was completed four hours and 42 minutes after the start of the incident.
- November 4—Europe—On that night, over 15 million households across the main parts of Germany, France, Italy, Belgium, Spain, and Portugal were left without power after a cascading breakdown of the 2006 European blackout. Power grids of several other nations (Belgium, Netherlands, Poland, Switzerland, Czech Republic, Greece, and Morocco) experienced minor local outages. The root cause was an overload triggered by the German electricity company E.ON switching off an electricity line over the river Ems to allow the cruise ship Norwegian Pearl to pass through safely. The impact of this disconnection on the security of the network had not been properly assessed, and resulted in the European transmission grid splitting into three independent parts for a period of two hours. The imbalance between generation and demand in each section resulted in the power outages for consumers.
- December 14—United States and Canada—The Hanukkah Eve windstorm of 2006 caused widespread damage to the power grid throughout Washington and into parts of Oregon, British Columbia, and Idaho; in some cases, blackouts in the affected area lasted longer than a week.

==== 2007 ====
- January 16–March 24—Australia—Power was cut to 200,000 people in Victoria when bushfires caused the state's electricity connection to the national grid to shut down.
- April 26—Colombia—A nationwide blackout struck at approximately 10:15 am local time, caused by an undetermined technical failure at a substation in the capital, Bogotá. Power returned to most parts of the country after several hours.
- July 23—Spain—Barcelona suffered a near-total blackout. Several areas remained without electricity for more than 78 hours due to a massive electrical substation chain failure.
- September 26–27—Brazil—A cyberattack caused major disruptions affecting more than three million people in dozens of cities in Espírito Santo.
- December 2—Canada—A winter storm damaged transmission systems, resulting in a blackout over much of Eastern Newfoundland and Labrador affecting close to 100,000 customers. About 7,500 customers on the Bonavista Peninsula were without service for almost a week.
- December 8–12—United States—A series of ice events cut power to over one million homes and businesses across the Great Plains, including large portions of Oklahoma, Kansas, and Nebraska.
- December 12—Netherlands—A Royal Netherlands Air Force AH-64 Apache Attack helicopter on a routine training mission, crashed into high-voltage power lines. This resulted in a blackout affecting over 50,000 households in the Tielerwaard and Bommelerwaard region. Power was restored after three days.

==== 2008 ====
- February 20—Indonesia—Coal supplies to some power plants in Java were stopped, as ships could not dock at ports due to large waves. This resulted in an electricity deficit of about 1,000 megawatts, and the power supply was shut off in several areas to protect the aging infrastructure. This affected the capital, Jakarta.
- February 26—United States—A failed switch and fire at an electrical substation outside Miami triggered widespread blackouts in parts of Florida affecting four million people. The nuclear reactors at Turkey Point power plant were shut down on the 84 °F (29 °C) day. The failure disrupted power to customers in 35 southern Florida counties and spread into the northern Florida peninsula. The affected region ultimately ranged from Miami to Tampa on the state's west coast and Brevard County on the east coast.
- April 2—Australia—Around 420,000 households were left without power in Melbourne and in other parts of Victoria after the state was hit by winds of up to 130 km/h.
- April 8—Poland—From around 3:30 am, around 400,000 persons were left without power in the city of Szczecin and its surroundings (as far as 100 km away). Most power was restored within a day. The reason was the fall of wet, heavy snow, which stuck to the power cables and caused them to break. One of the major powerline pillars broke in the aftermath.
- May 20—Tanzania—The entire island of Zanzibar suffered a complete shutdown of power. It happened at around 10:00 pm local time, and was caused by a rupture of the undersea cable from mainland Tanzania. Power was restored after one month, on June 18.
- September 13—United States—Hurricane Ike landed in Galveston, Texas and left over two million customers without power in the Greater Houston area. Power to one million homes was restored by day 6 and to two million homes by day 16.
- December 11—United States—Rare winter snowfall in Southern Louisiana caused 10,000 power outages due to the accumulation of snow on transmission lines. Later that night in Massachusetts and New Hampshire, an ice storm hit, causing one million people to lose their power.
- December 12—United States—A large ice storm in the Northeast collapsed power lines from Maine to Pennsylvania due to ice buildup on wires and trees and branches falling on power lines. At the peak of the outages, about 1.5 million people were without power. It took about two weeks to restore power to all locations.
- December 26—United States—Power was lost for about 12 hours on the entire island of Oahu, Hawaii, starting at about 6:45 pm, where President-elect Barack Obama and his family were vacationing. It occurred due to lightning strikes on power lines, which caused HECO's system to trip.

==== 2009 ====
- January 23—France—A severe windstorm knocked out power to 1.2 million customers.
- January 27—United States—An ice storm hit Kentucky and in Southern Indiana knocking out power to about 769,000. As of February 15, about 12,000 were still without power from this storm.
- January 27–31—Australia—Hundreds of thousands of homes in Victoria, including Melbourne, suffered various power failures as a result of a record heat wave. It is estimated that over 500,000 residents in Melbourne were without power for the evening of January 30. The outage affected much of central Melbourne with train and tram services cancelled, the evacuation of Crown Casino, traffic light failures, people being rescued from lifts and patrons of the Victorian Arts Centre evacuated and shows cancelled. The outage occurred only an hour after the National Electricity Market Management Company (NEMMCO) issued a statement saying load shedding was ending and power had been restored. Authorities say there had been a major electricity failure in the city's west, caused by the three-day heatwave. It is believed an explosion at South Morang contributed to the power problems along three transmission lines supplying Victoria's west and Victorian power supplier SP AusNet shed 1,000 megawatts.
- March 30—United Kingdom—A major power cut hits homes and business in Glasgow and parts of western Scotland. The affected areas included the west end of Glasgow, Bearsden, Clydebank, Helensburgh, Dumbarton and as far afield as Lochgilphead and Oban. Arran was also affected from the outage. The power cut occurred at 4:20 pm and power was slowly restored between 5:20 and 6:30 pm.
- April 15—Kazakhstan and Kyrgyzstan—A little before 9:00 pm, a severe power cut blacked out up to 80% of Almaty and northern parts of Kyrgyzstan, affecting a few million people for several hours. Power was not restored until after midnight local time.
- July 20—United Kingdom—Power was cut to around 100,000 homes in the areas of South East London and North Kent, after vandals deliberately caused a fire near a cable installation, which caused failure of a 132 kV cable and four circuit boards. Due to the nature of the cable, it was impossible to re-route supplies around other cables without overloading them. As a result, power supplies were cut to about half of the homes for approximately four days, while other homes were given three-hour allocations of power followed by six hours "off". Over 70 mobile generators were brought in from around the country to help restore power in what was the largest deployment in London's history.
- October 30—New Zealand—At around 8:00 am local time, power was cut to the whole of Northland and most of the northern half of Auckland, affecting 280,000 customers (14.5% of the country). A forklift carrying a shipping container accidentally hit one of the Ōtāhuhu to Henderson 220 kV circuits while the other circuit was out for maintenance, leaving the region supplied by four low capacity 110 kV circuits. Power was restored to the entire region around 11:00 am.
- November 10–20—Brazil and Paraguay—Starting at 10:13 pm Brasília official time, the 2009 Brazil and Paraguay blackout was caused by the failure of transmission lines from Itaipu Dam, the world's second-largest hydroelectric dam, affecting over 80 million customers. The failure was caused by a major thunder storm which affected a key transmission line to southeastern Brazil, causing all 20 turbines at the plant to shut down due to the abrupt fall of power demand. Four of Brazil's most densely populated states entirely lost power (including São Paulo and Rio de Janeiro) with 14 more states being partly affected. The entire country of Paraguay experienced the power failure. It took about seven hours for the system to fully recover. This is regarded as one of the largest blackouts in history, taking 10 days for power to be fully restored.

=== 2010s ===
==== 2010 ====
- January 30—Australia—Two separate transmission lines were hit by lightning, blacking out Darwin, Northern Territory and the nearby cities of Katherine and Palmerston starting at about 6:00 am. Power was restored to all areas by 4:30 pm.
- February—United States—A pair of blizzards hit the Northeast on February 5–6 and again just a few days later on February 9–10. Among the hardest hit areas was the Baltimore–Washington corridor, with well over 200,000 people impacted at the height of the outages and about two-thirds of those without power for periods lasting from half a day to several days. Other urban areas, such as Pittsburgh, were also affected.
- March 14—Chile—The March 2010 Chile blackout left roughly 15 million people, about 90% of the country's population, without power when a major transformer failed in southern Chile. Power began to be restored within a few hours, and almost all of the country had power by the following day. The outage was not directly related to damage from the earthquake that hit the country the previous month.
- March 14—United States—A severe windstorm disrupted power to hundreds of thousands of customers primarily in southwestern Connecticut as well as parts of Westchester County, Long Island, and New Jersey as a result of a severe wind and rain storm. The outage lasted as long as six days for some customers in the hardest hit communities. Many public school districts were closed for up to five days the following week.
- March 30—United Kingdom—about 30,000 homes in Northern Ireland were hit by a power cut, caused by winter weather conditions. Omagh, Enniskillen, Dungannon, Derry, Coleraine, and Ballymena were affected.
- June 27—United Kingdom—Portsmouth, England suffered a massive blackout when a substation caught fire.
- July 15—United States—76,000 people in Oakland and Wayne counties in southeastern Michigan lost power at approximately 7:00 pm during heavy storms.
- July 25—United States—An estimated 250,000 Pepco customers lost power in the Washington, D.C., area due to severe storms that swept through the area.
- September 1–21—Iceland—The country experienced a massive power outage.

==== 2011 ====
- February 2—United States—In Texas, forced outages at two major coal-fired power plants and high electricity demand due to cold weather caused rolling blackouts, affecting up to 3.2 million people.
- February 3—Australia—Cyclone Yasi hit communities in North Queensland. The cyclone winds reached 300 km/h (186mp/h) and caused widespread damage through many communities. 170,000 homes lost electricity.
- February 4—Brazil—At least eight states in the Northeast Region—Alagoas, Bahia, Ceará, Paraíba, Pernambuco, Piauí, Rio Grande do Norte, and Sergipe—suffered a major blackout from around midnight to 4:00 am. It is estimated that 53 million people were affected. Major cities such as Salvador, Recife, and Fortaleza were completely out of power.
- February 22—New Zealand—At 12:51, a 6.3-magnitude earthquake struck Christchurch. Over 80 percent of the city (approximately 160,000 customers) lost power. Most power was restored within five days, though some central areas were still without power as late as May 1.
- April 27—United States—One of the United States's most devastating tornado outbreaks disrupted power to most of northern Alabama; some 311 high-tension electrical transmission towers were destroyed by multiple, violent tornadoes. The Browns Ferry Nuclear Plant, the largest in Alabama and the second largest nuclear plant in the US, was also disconnected by the tornadoes, leading the operators to shut down all three reactors following the event.
- June 30—India—Chennai suffered a major power outage that affected many parts of the city for more than 15 hours.
- July 11—United States—The Chicago area was hit by a large derecho which disrupted power to over 850,000.
- July 11—Cyprus—A half-week power outage affected all cities on the Greek part of the island. The outage was caused by an explosion next to the Vassilikos power plant.
- July 23—Canada—the failure of a glass insulator caused an outage of most of Northern Saskatchewan for about four hours.
- August 27–28—United States—Hurricane Irene caused over five million power outages.
- September 8–9—United States and Mexico—the 2011 Southwest blackout affected parts of Southern California and Arizona, as well as parts of northwestern Mexico. The failure initiated after maintenance of a 500 kV line brought it offline, and subsequent weaknesses in operations planning and lack of real-time situational awareness at multiple power stations led to cascading outages. Power restoration was generally effective, but also affected by communication issues, with 100% power restoration occurring from 6–12 hours depending on location. Over five million people were affected.
- September 16—South Korea—The country experienced a widespread blackout due to hot weather.
- September 24—Chile—Nine million people in the north and central region were affected by the 2011 Chile blackout which lasted for at least two hours.
- October—United States—A snowstorm along the East Coast caused over two million power outages. Some residents of Connecticut and western Massachusetts were without electricity for over 11 days.

==== 2012 ====
- January 14–April 27—Turkey—A 380 kV transformer failure in Bursa Natural Gas Fueled Combined Cycle PP, was accused of voltage deviations in the interconnected power grid that resulted in a blackout. Another failure occurred in 154 kV Babaeski substation which caused a blackout in Thrace. Six cities and more than 20 million people were affected by the Marmara blackout of 2012. The power was back in all cities in the evening. The blackout disrupted metro and tram operation in Istanbul. Also gas heating systems did not work during the blackout. The problem was resolved by getting electricity from Bulgaria to Thrace and feeding lines in Istanbul from Ambarlı Natural Gas PP in Istanbul, it took 104 days before power was fully restored.
- April 4—Cyprus—A blackout hit every city in the island after the Dhekelia Power Station failed from 4:42 to 9:20 am.
- April—United States—PG&E customers in Oakland, California, and surrounding areas in Alameda County suffered a heat-related power outage.
- June 29—United States—A line of thunderstorms with hurricane-force winds swept from Iowa to the Mid-Atlantic coast and disrupted power to more than 3.8 million people in Indiana, Ohio, West Virginia, Pennsylvania, Maryland, New Jersey, Virginia, Delaware, North Carolina, Kentucky, and Washington, D.C.
- July 30—India—Due to a massive breakdown in the northern grid, there was a major power failure which affected seven northern states, including Delhi, Punjab, Haryana, Himachal Pradesh, Uttar Pradesh, Jammu and Kashmir, and Rajasthan. It was the preludium for the outage at the following day.
- July 31—India—The 2012 India blackout left half the country without electricity supply. This affected hundreds of trains, hundreds of thousands of households and other establishments as the grid that connects generating stations with customers collapsed for the second time in two days.
- October 29–30—United States—Hurricane Sandy brought high winds and coastal flooding to a large portion of the eastern United States, leaving an estimated 8 million customers without power. The storm, which came ashore near Atlantic City, New Jersey, as a Category 1 hurricane, took out power for millions of homes and businesses in New Jersey (2.7 million), New York (2.2 million), Pennsylvania (1.2 million), Connecticut (620,000), Massachusetts (400,000), Maryland (290,000), West Virginia (268,000), Ohio (250,000), and New Hampshire (210,000). Power outages were also reported in a number of other states, including Virginia, Maine, Rhode Island, Vermont, and the District of Columbia.

==== 2013 ====
- January 26–February 5—Australia—Ex-Tropical Cyclone Oswald caused the loss of power to over 250,000 customers in South East Queensland. Power was gradually restored over about 10 days.
- February 8–9—United States—Some 650,000 homes and businesses in the northeast lost power as the result of a powerful nor'easter that brought hurricane-force wind gusts and more than two feet (60 cm) of snow to New England.
- March 22—United Kingdom—200,000 homes in the Greater Belfast area lost power as the result of a fault with the high-voltage transmission network during a snow storm.
- March 28—Trinidad and Tobago- A nationwide blackout occurred, which was reportedly caused by low gas pressure around 12:37 am AST. The outage stemmed from two causes: a problem with the gas supply from Phoenix Park Gas Processors Ltd, which affected Trinidad, and a subsequent problem at the Cove power plant, which affected Tobago. T&TEC was able to restart the generators at Cove soon after, restoring power to the island from as early as 1 am. The final customer came back on at approximately 3 am. In Trinidad, T&TEC said the restoration started at approximately 4.45 am, as there was some delay in restarting the generators at the PowerGen plant in Point Lisas. Around 11 am, approximately 90% of customers in Trinidad were back on with their electricity supply.
- April 1—Poland—100,000 people suffered under power outages due to heavy snowfall. Warsaw Airport found the snow difficult to operate in.
- May 5—Philippines—40–50% of Luzon suffered power outages after several transmission lines tripped out, resulting in the isolation of Santa Rita, San Lorenzo, Calaca, Ilijan and Pagbilao Power Plants.
- May 21—Thailand—A power failure affected fourteen provinces (out of 76) for four hours, starting at 7:00 pm local time.
- May 22—Vietnam and Cambodia—2013 Southern Vietnam and Cambodia blackout. When moving a tree in Binh Duong, a truck driver let the tree bump onto a line in the national power grid (500 kV), causing an outage in 22 provinces and cities in the southern part of Vietnam, it took 8 hours before power was fully restored.
- September 24—Turkey the Trakia region lost electric power. According to TREDAS (Power distribution utility of Trakia region), a failure in the substation of Hamitabat Gas Fueled Combined Cycle Power Plant in Lüleburgaz in Kırklareli Province caused a power outage in the TEİAŞ((in Turkish)) 154 kV interconnected power transmission grid. Affected places included Tekirdağ, Edirne, Kırklareli provinces and Silivri in Istanbul Province. The affected population was about 1.5 million citizens. Power was fully restored after two hours (by 00:24 on 25 September).
- December 22- Canada—The December 2013 North American storm complex, covering an area from Ontario to as far east as the maritime provinces, caused power failures. According to reports, as many as 300,000 customers in Toronto lost power. Later reports placed the peak number in Ontario without power at 600,000 The storm also caused widespread power outages in mid-Michigan. According to reports, as many as 500,000 lost power with restoration efforts expected through December 29.

==== 2014 ====
- February 27—Philippines—Parts of Mindanao suffered power outages for six hours.
- July 15—Philippines— 60% of the power grid in Luzon was lost due to Typhoon Rammasun (Glenda) that devastated the Southern part of the island where many power plants are located, such as the Geothermal Plant in Bicol and the Coal Plant in Batangas.
- July 21—United Kingdom—A major power outage left London, Essex, Kent, and surrounding areas with no power for about half an hour. The cause was revealed to be schoolchildren who set fire to books near power lines in Havering, East London.
- August 12—Malta—A nationwide power outage lasted for almost six hours. Power was lost across Malta island and Gozo at 7:50 pm and restored to most areas by 1:30 am. Due to problems with emergency generators, Malta International Airport had to close the runway and several flights were diverted to Catania and Palermo. The cause was a damaged cable which caused an explosion at the electricity distribution centre and automatic shutdown of both power stations. A previous nationwide power cut occurred on January 9, caused by a fault at the Delimara Power Station.
- September 4—Egypt—A major blackout struck Cairo and other cities at 6 am, continuing for hours, bringing some key services to a halt. The power outage cost the strategic facilities of the Suez Canal an estimated LE100 million, as naval traffic and industrial activity came to a halt along the vital waterway. Some television channels were halted for nearly two hours due to the outage.
- October 5—New Zealand—At 2:15 am, a cable trench fire at Transpower's Penrose substation in Auckland disconnected supply to Vector's local distribution network. Over 85,000 customers in Auckland's central-eastern suburbs lost electricity for over 12 hours. 50% of customers were reconnected by evening and 75% by the following morning.
- November 1—Bangladesh—A nationwide power outage lasted for almost 10 hours. Power was lost at around 11:30 am and restored to most areas by 11:00 pm.
- November 21—South Africa—Rolling blackouts were implemented nationwide and continued for the duration of the weekend. This followed similar outages earlier in the same month, all of which were triggered as a result of a collapsed coal silo at Eskom's Majuba Power Station, during a period when the state power company was already experiencing severe supply strain on the national grid due to technical difficulties affecting some of its other major turbines.

==== 2015 ====
- On January 26—Pakistan—80% of the country (some 140 million people) were without power due to technical fault at a power station in Sindh. (2015 Pakistan blackout)
- February 11—Kuwait—A technical problem in one of the main power grids caused most of the country to lose power.
- March 27—Netherlands—A technical problem in one of the main power grids in North Holland caused 1 million households to lose power for at least an hour.
- March 31—Turkey—Due to technical problems, over 90% of the country (about 70 million people) lost power. Unaffected regions were Van and Hakkari provinces which were fed by electricity from Iran.
- August 29—Canada—A powerful wind storm disrupted power to 710,000 customers (nearly 50% of BCHydro's customers) on Vancouver Island and Vancouver's lower mainland. 705,000 customers had power restored within 72 hours of the storm. This was BCHydro's single largest outage.
- November 17—United States—A powerful wind storm that downed power lines left more than 161,000 customers without electricity in Spokane County, Washington and in neighboring counties. It exceeded the ice storm that occurred 19 years previous, almost to the day.
- November 21—Crimea—A power outage left 1.2 million people in Crimea with reduced or no power following explosions at transmission towers in Ukraine.
- December 23—Ukraine—The December 2015 Ukraine power grid cyberattack left 230 thousand people without power for 1–6 hours.

==== 2016 ====
- June 7—Kenya—A nationwide blackout which lasted for over 4 hours was caused by a monkey entering a power station. Only about 10 million citizens were affected by the outage as the World Bank estimates that only 23% of the population have access to electricity.
- September 1—United States—Hurricane Hermine swept across the Florida Panhandle, directly affecting the state capital, Tallahassee. Hermine disrupted power for more than 350,000 people in Florida and southern Georgia, many of whom were without power for a week.
- September 21—Puerto Rico—A full power system collapse occurred on the island which affected its 3.5 million inhabitants. The outage, popularly referred to as the "Apagón" (translated as "super outage") has been labeled as the largest in Puerto Rico not caused by an atmospheric event. The outage occurred after two transmission lines, with power running up to 230 kV, failed.
- September 28—Australia—The 2016 South Australian blackout affected the entire state of South Australia (1.7 million people), owing to two tornados that destroyed three critical elements of infrastructure, and the power system protected itself by shutting down.

==== 2017 ====
- March 8—United States—A severe winter windstorm interrupted power for about 1 million customers in Michigan. About 730,000 were still without power the next day.
- July 1—Central America—Countries in the region suffered a 6-hour power outage affecting millions.
- July 8—United States—An explosion at a Northridge power plant caused a widespread power outage in the San Fernando Valley, Los Angeles.
- July 27—United States—A crew working on the replacement for the Herbert C. Bonner Bridge in the Outer Banks of North Carolina, severed a power cable and caused a blackout on the Outer Banks islands which affected more than 7,000 people during the peak of tourist season. The outage lasted eight days.
- August 15—Taiwan—A massive power cut affected millions of households.
- August 26—Uruguay—Half the population endured a 4-hour outage. No cause was reported besides bad weather.
- September 20—Puerto Rico—Hurricane Maria knocked out power to the entire island. Restoration efforts involved rebuilding significant parts of the already dilapidated power grid. Only 55% of residents had power back after three months, and as of August 2018, electricity had finally been restored to the entirety of the island.
- October 30—United States and Canada—A combination of the remnants of tropical storm Philippe and an extratropical system resulted in approximately 1.8 million power outages in New England. The storm was particularly bad in Midcoast Maine where roads became impassible for almost a week, leaving many schools to close for five to six days. Many people did not get their power back on for over ten days in some of the worst hit areas. In Canada, Hydro-Québec reported 200,000 customers losing power because of damages due to strong winds produced by the storm.
- December 7–10—United States—Winter Storm Benji came through the southeast US states, causing over 900,000 customers to lose power.

==== 2018 ====
- January 10, January 21, and February 27—Sudan—The entire country suffered a complete power outage on those days.
- March 2—United States—A Nor'easter struck the East Coast, leaving over two million people without power.
- March 21—Brazil—A power outage struck large swathes of the country, affecting tens of millions of people, especially in the northern and northeastern regions. The blackout was due to the failure of a transmission line near the Belo Monte hydroelectric station.
- April 12—Puerto Rico—870,000 customers lost power when a tree fell on a major power line near Cayey while workers were clearing vegetation. A week later, on April 18, power was lost to all of Puerto Rico when an excavator repairing 2017 damage from Hurricane Maria hit a line connecting two major power plants. After a request by Governor Ricardo Rosselló, the government electricity monopoly, PREPA, terminated its relationship with D. Grimm, the subcontractor responsible for both incidents.
- July 3—Azerbaijan—From around 00:20 till around 8:00, nearly the whole country, except Nakhchivan (which had its own independent station), Nagorno-Karabakh, and other areas controlled by Armenian forces, had a major power outage. The reason was unexpectedly high temperatures which could not be handled by Mingachevir Electric Station (the country's main electricity supplier).
- September 6—Japan—The 2018 Hokkaido Eastern Iburi earthquake knocked out power to about 2.95 million households in Hokkaido, mainly due to damage to the coal-fired thermal power station at Atsuma, according to a Japan Federation of Electric Power Companies report.
- September 21—Canada—A severe thunderstorm, with wind gusts up to 260 km/h, hit the Ottawa/Gatineau region. The storm caused large scale damage to the power infrastructure, with 80 poles broken and one transformer station damaged. The destruction caused power outage for about 172,000 customers for intervals between few hours and several days.
- October 10—United States—Hurricane Michael hit the U.S. Gulf Coast, causing thousands of customers in the Florida Panhandle, especially Panama City and Port St. Joe, to lose power for up to 10 days.
- October 15—Venezuela—A fire in La Arenosa electrical station in Carabobo caused a massive blackout which affected 16 states varying from 1 to 3 hours, although some reported that it took 18 hours in some zones. The Electrical Energy Minister Luis Motta Domínguez reported that the cause of the fire was because of an explosion.
- November 15—Indonesia—A power outage struck South Sulawesi, West Sulawesi and parts of Central Sulawesi leaving an estimated total of nine million people without electrical supply. The blackout was due to the interference with the transmission path of the Makale-Palopo line.
- December 4—Canada—Transmission line failures in south Saskatchewan caused widespread outages to 175,000 to 200,000 SaskPower customers for several hours. The outage was caused by significant frost collection on grid equipment.
- December 20—Canada—A windstorm caused outages to 600,000 BC Hydro customers across the Lower Mainland, Vancouver Island and Gulf Islands. The storm damaged 300 power poles and 170 transformers. Power was fully restored December 31. Winds reached speeds of 100 km/h.

==== 2019 ====
- January 20—Central America—A failure caused by a misplaced cable at a substation in Panama caused a transformer breaker trip that caused a nationwide blackout that extended to parts of Costa Rica, Guatemala and El Salvador.
- February 24—United States—A wind storm in the Lower Great Lakes caused by a very tight pressure gradient around a low pressure system caused hundreds of thousands of power outages, with Ohio and Pennsylvania being the hardest hit. Restoration efforts lasted for up to five days.
- March 7—Venezuela—The first in a series of concurrent, nationwide blackouts. The first large outage was partially resolved by March 14, but smaller outages persisted in some regions for days afterwards, and a second multi-day outage began on March 25. In March, the country was without power for at least 10 days overall. The blackouts stemmed from the failure of Simón Bolívar Hydroelectric Plant (Guri Dam) in the state of Bolívar, and left most of the country in darkness. By March 12, power began returning to some parts of the country, but Caracas remained only partially powered and western Venezuela remained dark. Government officials claimed the blackout was an act of sabotage, while experts attributed the failure to aging infrastructure and insufficient maintenance. At least 43 deaths were attributed to the initial wave of blackouts. The last reported blackout occurred on July 22, but was resolved the following day.
- June 9—United States—350,000 people in Dallas County, Texas lost power after a severe thunderstorm downed hundreds of trees across the area. 200,000 remained without power on the evening of June 10 and 16,000 on the afternoon of June 12 restored. 41% of traffic signals in the city of Dallas were affected; 496 were temporarily inoperable and 168 reverted to flashing red signals.
- June 16—Argentina, Uruguay and Paraguay were affected by a blackout. The entirety of those countries suffered a power outage, leaving an estimated total of 48 million people without electricity. The cause was operative error.
- July 19–20—United States—Severe thunderstorms, tornadoes and floods caused damage and power outages throughout Wisconsin disrupted power to more than 277,000 customers. Governor Tony Evers declared a statewide state of emergency, with preliminary estimates of damage and cleanup costs of US$5.3 million. Some affected customers were still without power a week later.
- July 19—United States—Storms and high winds in Michigan caused loss of power to roughly 600,000 to 800,000 customers and left many still without power for six days, the second highest number of storm related outages in Michigan power company DTE Energy Co.'s history.
- July 22—United States—Over 300,000 people went without power in New Jersey following a storm.
- August 4—Indonesia—More than 100 million people were affected by a blackout that affected most of Java; particularly Banten, Jakarta, West Java, parts of Central Java, and the Special Region of Yogyakarta. The blackout began as early as 11:50 local time, when Jakarta MRT authorities began to detect the loss of electrical supply, rendering its trains inoperable and requiring passengers to evacuate. Jakarta LRT and KRL Commuterline also suffered from the blackout making TransJakarta the only mass transit transportation remaining in operation at the time of the blackout. Go-Jek and Grab had major problems due to lack of internet services. Most traffic lights stopped functioning, causing congestion. The initial blackout lasted around 9 hours where at 21:00 local time power to most of the affected areas was restored, with almost 20 hours of blackout in total. Initially, the PLN (Indonesia's state electricity company) stated the cause of the outage was disruption in a number of plants in Java, but later said that the cause was a disruption in the Ungaran–Pemalang high-voltage power line.
- August 9—United Kingdom—A power blackout hit parts of England and Wales, affecting over a million customers and causing widespread travel disruption. Power cuts were reported in north Oxfordshire, the Midlands, Wales, London, the North, and South-East. Oxfordshire County Council issued a statement saying traffic lights had failed in parts of the county and one victim said the failure had caused gridlock in Banbury.Train services were affected across South-East England causing trains to be delayed and canceled when departing from London stations after a surge on the grid cut off the controls to many railway signals. The blackout was blamed on a lightning strike and subsequent failure to remain operational by energy providers Hornsea Wind Farm, Npower and UK Power Networks, who were later fined £10.5m.
- September 1—United States, Canada and the Bahamas—Hurricane Dorian damaged transmission systems and caused extensive lengthy power outages along the Atlantic seaboard of North America.
- September 17—Central America—A failure in a transmission line left Nicaragua and Honduras without power.
- September 29—Spain—A power cut struck the entire island of Tenerife, affecting almost one million people and initiating dozens of emergency calls, most of them to people trapped in elevators.
- November 1—United States and Canada—A major storm left nearly 2,000,000 people without power. In some areas of eastern Ontario and most of southern Québec, 964,000 people were affected. The same storm also cut power to over 800,000 customers in 14 US states between Thursday, October 31 and Saturday, November 2, with 420,000 still without power after three days. On November 2, 600,000 Canadian homes had been reconnected, though over 200,000 still remained disconnected. Many flooded areas—like Sherbrooke—were left without power even longer.
- November 3—France—Around 140,000 people were without power for over nine hours in the Pyrénées-Atlantiques region.
- November 18—Barbados—Approximately 130,000 people on the island lost power for over 13 hours starting at 7:29 am. The outage continued into the following day.
- November 25—Australia—A wind storm ripped through Sydney, leaving 76,000 homes without power, with 24,000 still in the dark on Wednesday, November 27.

=== 2020s ===
==== 2020 ====
- January 19—Indonesia—A power outage struck Central and South Kalimantan, leaving an estimated total of 6.8 million people without electrical supply due to a thunderstorm.
- April 12–14—United States—A tornado outbreak moved across the US from Texas to Maine, causing 4.3 million customers to lose power, and affecting an estimated 9.3 million people. The system created 140 confirmed tornadoes including three rated EF4.
- August 3–5—United States—Hurricane Isaias pushed through the US from South Carolina to New England then up into Canada, causing 6.4 million customers to lose power, affecting an estimated 13.8 million people. There were around 1.65 million customers affected in New Jersey and 1.19 million customers in New York.
- August 10—United States—a derecho moved through the US across Nebraska, Iowa, Illinois, and Indiana, leaving more than 1 million customers without electricity access; including 250,000 customers in the Chicago area.
- October 12—India—Mumbai suffered one of its worst blackouts in decades as technical glitches caused its power-transmission network to shut down, leaving millions of people without power for hours.
- October 26–28—United States—An ice storm, bringing snow from New Mexico into Oklahoma and northern Texas, left over 400,000 people without power in Oklahoma for multiple days, with over 40,000 still without power 10 days later. Oklahoma Gas & Electric called it "the worst storm in our company's history". The storm was especially damaging because leaves were still on the trees and other tall vegetation, causing large limbs to break and fall onto power lines and city streets due to the extra weight.

==== 2021 ====
- January 9—Pakistan—A power outage struck almost the entire country, leaving around 200 million people without electricity. The blackout was due to a frequency drop resulting from a fault at Guddu at 11:41 p.m.
- January 10—United States—Outages related to snowfall were experienced across eastern Texas, affecting over 100,000 customers.
- January 19—Philippines—The entire Western Mindanao area experienced a total blackout starting at 8:30 am PST. According to NGCP, the incident has been blamed on maliciously planted vegetation.
- February 14–15 and 17–18—United States—A first and second winter storm and associated cold wave caused over five million inhabitants to lose power across the US, with Texas alone having over 4.3 million customers without power.
- May 21—Jordan—A blackout left the entire population of 10 million people without electricity for three hours.
- May 25—Australia—Almost 400,000 customers in Queensland lost power at around 2pm AEST after a fire in a turbine at a power station in Central Queensland. Power was gradually restored over the following hours into the evening.
- May 27—Indonesia—At 13:39 pm, there were blackouts in East, Central, and South Kalimantan provinces. The cause of the blackout was a disruption in the Tengkawang–Embalut 150 kV transmission network. The disruption caused 29 substations to experience blackouts. More than half of Kalimantan's population was affected.
- June 10—Puerto Rico—A fire at a transformer substation in Monacillos, interrupted power to 400,000 customers.
- August 11—United States—Severe thunderstorms knocked out power to more than 830,000 people in Michigan.
- September 13-Germany-A fault at the Dresden-Süd 110 kV substation caused loss of power in the city of Dresden and surrounding countryside. The fault was blamed on a metal-clad toy balloon that had fallen in the outdoor switchgear causing a short or earth fault.
- China—Persistent blackouts in the second half of the year reduced factory output, hitting millions of factories and homes in more than half the nation and impacting 44% of industrial activity. Factories were cut off from power for 3 to 7 days at a time.
- 29 October—Australia—A severe windstorm hit Melbourne, knocking out power to more than 520,000 customers. Victorian energy minister Lily D'Ambrosio said that this was the largest number of customers without power in the state's history.

==== 2022 ====
- January 25—Kazakhstan, Kyrgyzstan, and Uzbekistan—The Kyrgyz capital Bishkek, Uzbek capital Tashkent, and Kazakhstan's economic center Almaty were hit by a severe power outage caused by a grid stressed by summer drought and a recent boom in cryptocurrency mining.
- May 21—Canada—A derecho, with peak winds of around 190 kilometres per hour (120 mph), ravaged through parts of Ontario and Quebec. At its peak, it caused roughly 1.1 million customers to lose their power and thousands were still without power a week after. It cost approximately CA$70 million to repair the damage.
- June 13–14—United States—The Great Lakes Derecho pounded portions of Indiana, West Virginia, and Ohio with wind gusts up to 95 miles per hour; more than 600,000 households lost power across these three states. The situation was worsened by a following heat wave, causing high demand on electrical infrastructure which resulted in additional outages. Some of those affected by this storm did not get power restored for nearly a week.
- October 4—Bangladesh—140 million people lost power. It started shortly after 2:00 p.m. Government spokesman Shamim Ahsan alleged it was caused by a technical malfunction. The country was unable to import enough fuel for all its power stations, so some of them were shut down.
- October 22–present—Ukraine and Moldova—Air and missile attacks by Russian forces as part of its invasion of Ukraine have devastated much of the country's infrastructure and left millions without electricity. Outages also affected Moldova, which is heavily interconnected with the Ukrainian grid.
- November 4—United States—190,000 customers (more than half of the county's 365,000 households) in Snohomish County, Washington, were without power for several days after a windstorm swept through the area with wind speeds of up to 80 mph.
- December 3—United States—40,000 customers in Moore County, North Carolina, were left without power after gunfire at two substations.

==== 2023 ====
- January 1–Indonesia–Around 500 thousand electricity customers in Batam and Bintan lost power due to a failure at a gas power plant. The outage lasted at least until the following day.
- January 23—Pakistan—220 million people were without power from 7.34 am local time due to chronic power frequency fluctuations in the south of the country, up to 05:15 the next day.
- March 1—Argentina—Parts of Buenos Aires and the provinces of Buenos Aires, Santa Fe, Neuquén, Córdoba, and Mendoza experienced blackouts. Millions of people were affected for at least two hours during a heatwave as traffic lights went out of order and Buenos Aires Metro stations underwent total darkness. The outage was believed to have been caused by a fire in a field near high-tension lines connected to the Atucha Nuclear Power Plant.
- March 14—United States—Nearly 300,000 people in the San Francisco Bay Area, California were without power after strong wind storms.
- April 5—Canada—over 1.1 million customers were left without power due to a major ice storm that covered Montreal in ice and left hundreds of thousands without power well into the weekend.
- 9 April—South Africa—over 2.5 million people were left without power in the capital Pretoria after vandalised high voltage 132 kV power lines caused seven pylons to collapse onto the N4 Highway.
- 8 May—Botswana—the entire country lost power after midnight following a "grid disturbance" at Morupule A and B Power plants, as well as the Transmission Power Line that connects the country to South Africa. Load-shedding was implemented across the country while repairs were conducted.
- 14 September—Nigeria—a "total system collapse" resulted in widespread blackouts that affected the entire country.
- 20 September—Tunisia—a sudden breakdown at the Radès power station in the southern suburbs of Tunis caused a nationwide power outage that lasted for up to four hours.
- 9 December—2023 Sri Lankan blackouts
- 24 December — Nationwide blackout in Panama due to failure of a capacitor bank at a large substation for 5 hours.

==== 2024 ====
- January 2—Philippines—The entire Western Visayas region experienced a blackout starting at 2:19 pm PST. The cause of the outage was being investigated by the NGCP.
- June 4–5—Indonesia—Most of Sumatra experienced a major power failure caused by a disturbance at a transmission substation located on a high voltage overhead line in South Sumatra. Around 600,000 customers in West Sumatra alone were affected by the blackout.
- June 19—Ecuador—A nationwide blackout occurred following the failure of a transmission line.
- June 20—New Zealand—A falling transmission tower caused a power outage that affected most of Northland Region.
- 21 June—Balkans—A massive power outage left nearly all of Montenegro, as well as the coastal areas of Croatia and parts of Albania and Bosnia and Herzegovina without electricity, with Bosnia saying that the outage was caused by problems in a distribution line, while Albania attributed the outage to high temperatures.
- July 8–10—United States—Nearly 3 million people in Texas lost power after Hurricane Beryl moved through the state. More than 1.6 million people remained without power for two days after the hurricane struck.
- August 17–2024 Lebanon blackout
- August 30—Venezuela—A major power outage was reported nationwide, which the government of President Nicolas Maduro blamed on sabotage by the political opposition.
- September 27-October 11-United States-Hurricane Helene caused power outages in the Central Savannah River Area and an area ranging from Florida to New England.
- October 9–United States–Hurricane Milton caused power outages in the state of Florida.
- October 18–Cuba–A nationwide power outage following the unexpected shutdown of the Antonio Guiteras thermoelectric power plant.
- November 6–Cuba–Hurricane Rafael caused a nationwide blackout.
- November 19-26—United States—Over 600,000 people lost power when a bomb cyclone hit Washington State.
- December 4–Cuba–A substation failure caused an island-wide blackout.
- December 31—Puerto Rico—A blackout left most of the territory without electricity.

==== 2025 ====
- January–United States–Wildfires left much of Los Angeles without power because of emergency power shutdowns.
- January 24–Ireland–Storm Éowyn, an extratropical cyclone, hit the west of Ireland and left 768,000 premises without power owing to unprecedented damage to the transmission infrastructure. It took until February 12 for power to be fully restored.
- February 9–Sri Lanka–An issue at an electricity substation near Colombo caused a nationwide power outage. Officials blamed the incident on a monkey entering the grid transformer.
- February 13–Cuba–A substation failure left most of the island without power.
- February 25–Chile–A transmission line failure caused a nationwide blackout that affected 14 of the country's 16 regions and left 98% of the country's population without electricity.
- Beginning on 7 March, Cyclone Alfred caused power outages, at one point numbering over 315,000 homes without power in southeast Queensland and northern New South Wales, Australia.
- March 14–Cuba–A substation failure caused an island-wide blackout.
- March 15—Panama—A transformer at a power plant exploded, causing a protection system to activate in the power network which caused a nationwide blackout.
- March 21—United Kingdom—A transformer at a power substation caught fire leaving 67,000 homes without power, and caused Heathrow Airport to cancel flights for most of the day - affecting 200,000 passengers worldwide.
- April 16—Puerto Rico—The entire territory was struck by a blackout.
- April 28–Europe–Portugal, Spain, Andorra, and small portions of France were struck by power outages.
- April 29–May 6–United States–Severe storms where estimated wind gusts exceeded 90 miles per hour brought down trees and utility lines in Pittsburgh and much of western Pennsylvania, leaving over 400,000 without power with restoration continuing through May 6.
- May 2–Indonesia–A power outage occurred in Bali, affecting around 1.88 million customers. Power was fully restored by May 3.
- July 4–Czech Republic–A power outage occurred in Prague and the northern and eastern regions of the country.
- August 11–Iraq–A nationwide power outage occurred after two transmission lines were shut down due to high temperatures and increased demand in Babylon and Karbala Governorates during Arbaeen.
- September 9—Germany– An arson attack on power cables in Johannisthal, Berlin caused a major blackout, leaving around 50,000 households without electricity for several days.
- September 11–Cuba–A nationwide power outage occurred after a malfunction at a thermoelectric plant.
- September 26–Mexico–A transmission line failure caused a massive blackout affecting more than two million customers in Yucatan, Campeche and Quintana Roo.
- September 29–Indonesia–A technical issue during a transmission line upgrade caused a blackout affecting more than 700,000 customers in Aceh. By 1 October, power had been restored to around 60 percent of the impacted customers.
- November 11–Dominican Republic–A shutdown of generation units at the San Pedro de Macorís and Quisqueya Power Plants caused a nationwide blackout.
- December 3–Cuba–A transmission line failure caused a blackout in the western half of the island, leaving millions of people in Havana and surrounding areas without power.
- December 21–United States–Waymo cars became inoperable during a large-scale power outage in San Francisco, blocking traffic and intersections. In response, Waymo temporarily halted ride-hailing services until power was restored.

==== 2026 ====
- January 3–Germany–An arson attack by the far-left Vulkangruppe on power cables in Berlin caused a blackout affecting 40,000 households and lasting multiple days.
- January 21–Denmark–A disconnected undersea cable due to a technical issue caused a blackout in Bornholm.
- January 28–Europe–Storm Kristin caused over 1.17 million power outages in Portugal and Spain.
- February 23–Dominican Republic–A fault in a transmission line switch caused a nationwide blackout.
- March 4–Cuba–A fuel shortage caused a blackout in the western half of the island, leaving millions of people in Havana and surrounding areas without power.
- March 16–Cuba–A fuel shortage caused an island-wide blackout.
- March 21–Cuba–A fuel shortage caused an island-wide blackout.
- March 22–Philippines–A defective transformer caused a massive power outage in parts of Zamboanga City.
- May 14–Cuba–A fuel shortage caused a blackout in the eastern half of the island from Guantánamo to Ciego de Ávila, leaving several provinces without power.
- May 22–Indonesia–Weather-related disruptions in extra-high-voltage transmission line linking Muara Bungo and Sungai Rumbai in Jambi province caused widespread outages across, the provinces of Jambi, Aceh, Riau, North Sumatra, West Sumatra, and parts of Central Sumatra.
- June 5–Jamaica–The entire country was hit by a power outage.
- July 6–
  - Cuba–An island-wide blackout affected the country.
  - Zimbabwe–A nationwide power blackout occurred after a technical fault on the national electricity grid of the state-owned utility ZESA.
- July 10–Cuba–An island-wide blackout affected the country.
- July 12–United States–A vehicle struck a transmission tower that serves Erwin, North Carolina during bad weather, leaving the area without electricity overnight, carrying into the following day. Duke Energy had to replace the pole with a temporary power pole that will serve until a new permanent tower is installed. No people were injured during the incident.
- July 14–Cuba–An island-wide blackout affected the country.
- July 24–Georgia–The entire country was hit by a blackout, starting from around 00:10. The origin of the outage is being investigated.
- July 29–Ghana–A nationwide power outage hit after a major fault on the national electricity grid forced several power plants to shut down.
- August 2–Cuba–An island-wide blackout affected the country.
- August 11 - 2026 Gary power outage
- October 12–Indonesia–A power outage impacted Batam, affecting over 400 thousand customers. Power was gradually restored by the evening of October 12, though some customers remained impacted until the following day.
