= 2015 Pakistan blackout =

Power outage in Pakistan

The 2015 Pakistan blackout was a power outage that occurred across Pakistan on January 24, 2015.

== Cause ==
The Ministry of Water and Power released a statement that the blackout was caused due to a militant attack on a transmission tower near Naseerabad in Baluchistan province just before midnight.

== Areas affected ==
Due to the blackout, no electricity was available in Punjab, Khyber Pakhtunkhwa, Islamabad or Balochistan on the Saturday night. 80 per cent of the electricity supply was suspended during the blackout.
