= 2019 Argentina, Paraguay and Uruguay blackout =

Blackout affecting Argentina, Uruguay and parts of Paraguay

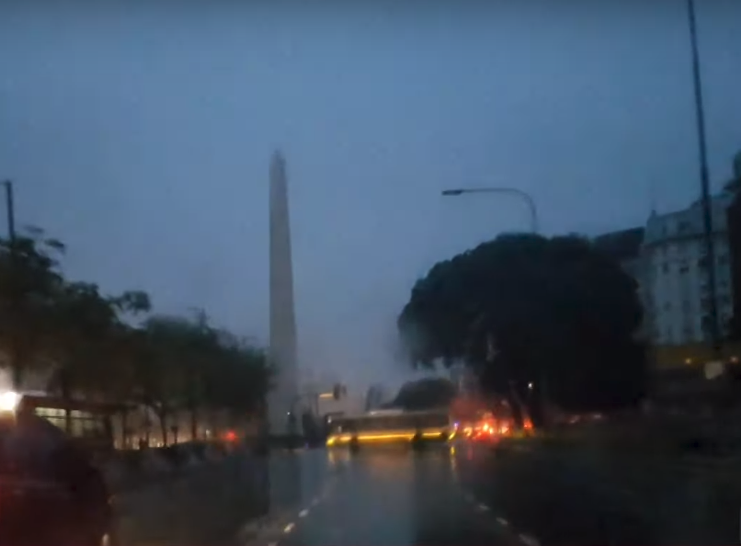
- Blackout at the Obelisco de Buenos Aires
- Date: 16 June 2019
- Location: Argentina (except Tierra del Fuego), Uruguay and parts of Paraguay
- Type: Blackout
- Cause: Operative error

On 16 June 2019, a massive power outage struck most of Argentina, all of Uruguay, and parts of Paraguay , leaving an estimated 48 million people without electrical supply.

By the following day it was confirmed that power had been restored to most of Argentina and Uruguay, and Argentine President Mauricio Macri promised a full investigation.

The blackout is believed to have been caused by an operational misbehavior from Transener, a transmission lines operator in Argentina. A 500 kV line running from Colonia Elía to Campana, crossing the Paraná Guazú river, was down on undergoing maintenance to repair the tower number 412, whose base had been suffering from erosion by the river. The company created a bypass using a nearby overhead line but failed to update the Automatic Generation Shutdown system (in Spanish: DAG), which alerts energy generators to network changes requiring a reduction in energy generation. This caused, after a short circuit which lowered demand, an excess of power generation in the grid, a lack of synchronization of power plants, loss of balance, and a low frequency in the network.

In about 30 seconds, a succession of automatic disconnections from the grid caused a blackout that came to affect 50 million users in the continent.

== Timeline ==
At 7:07 a.m. (UTC-3) on June 16, 2019, Argentina’s power grid suffered a sudden and widespread failure, which Energy Secretary Gustavo Lopetegui described as a “collapse.” The disruption originated in the Argentine Interconnection System, triggering a massive blackout that left an estimated 48 million people without power. The outage affected nearly all of Argentina—excluding Tierra del Fuego in the far south—as well as neighboring Uruguay and parts of Paraguay. Although some media reports suggested that the blackout extended to areas in Chile and southern Brazil, these claims were later denied by Chilean and Brazilian national authorities. President Mauricio Macri called the event “unprecedented.”

The Argentine electricity distributor Edesur announced via Twitter at 7:50 a.m. that the entire power supply for Argentina and Uruguay had been disrupted. The blackout caused significant disruptions in subway and train services but did not impact airborne transport, including electric-powered aircraft. Restoration efforts began quickly, and by 10 a.m., some areas in Buenos Aires had regained power, although Edesur warned that full restoration could take several hours. By 1:30 p.m., 75% of Uruguay had power restored.[12] As the afternoon progressed, electricity returned to 50,000 people in Argentina, including those in coastal cities and metropolitan areas of Uruguay, as confirmed by Uruguay’s state-owned power company, UTE. By evening, 98% of Argentina had its power supply reinstated.

By June 17, nearly all affected regions in Argentina and Uruguay had power restored. In response, President Macri pledged to launch an investigation into the cause of the blackout. Argentine media later reported that the outage was linked to a transmission failure originating from the Yacyretá hydroelectric dam.

== Impact ==
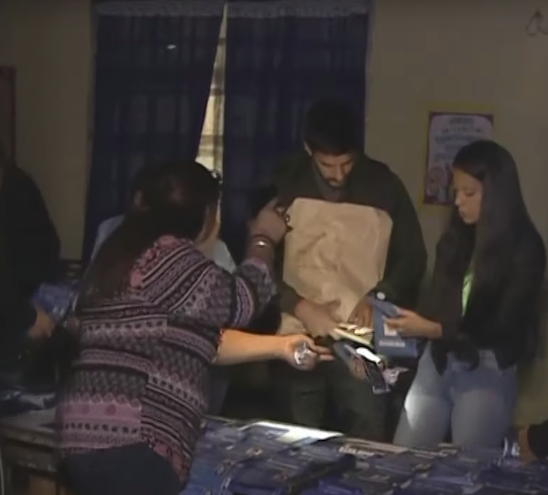
People voting in the local elections at the Formosa Province, during the blackout.

Distribution of drinking water was affected by the loss of power, with Agua y Saneamientos Argentinos, one of Argentina's largest water supply companies, urging people affected to reduce their water consumption.

The blackout had an impact on local gubernatorial elections taking place in Argentina, where the lack of power forced voters to fill out ballots in the dark, using their mobile phones as flashlights. In some regions of the country, the elections were postponed by authorities.

Medical patients who were dependent upon home equipment were urged to attend local hospitals, where similar devices were still operational, as they were powered by backup generators.

The one and only town within Argentina which did not suffer much trouble was Ticino, at the Córdoba Province. It has a bioenergy power plant, fueled by peanut shells, an organic waste product for the local peanut industry.

== Investigation ==
Investigations into the cause of the outage are being undertaken by both Edesur and the Argentine government.

An independent energy expert in Argentina attributed a role in the blackout to "systemic operational and design errors" in the country's energy infrastructure.

Argentine Energy Secretary Gustavo Lopetegui said it was unlikely to have been caused by a cyberattack.

Preliminary reports suggested that the blackout likely originated from a fault in a 500 kV circuit from the municipality of Colonia Elía to Belgrano, a suburb of Buenos Aires. A second 500 kV circuit from Colonia Elía to Mercedes subsequently tripped under automatic action; the cause of that trip is still under investigation. A third 500 kV line from Colonia Elía to Nueva Campana was out of service at the time owing to construction work.

== Aftermath ==
The Ente Nacional Regulador de la Electricidad will apply fines to the wholesaler energy distributor Transener. According to regulations, the maximum fine can be either 10% of the annual earnings or 50% of the monthly ones; Transener earned $9,838.5 million in 2018. Distributors Edenor and Edesur turned off 38% of the service, which harmed the situation as it was required a 52% to compensate the outage. Cammesa, the institution that regulates those distributors, explained that this was an automatic process, and that this failure was a consequence of badly programmed systems. Cammesa would redirect the money of the fees to the users, who would get a tax credit as compensation. Those credits would be of a uniform amount, unrelated to the actual time each user was without energy.

== See also ==
- 2019 Venezuelan blackouts
- Manhattan blackout of July 2019
- List of major power outages
