= 2012 Marmara blackout =

Power outage in Turkey

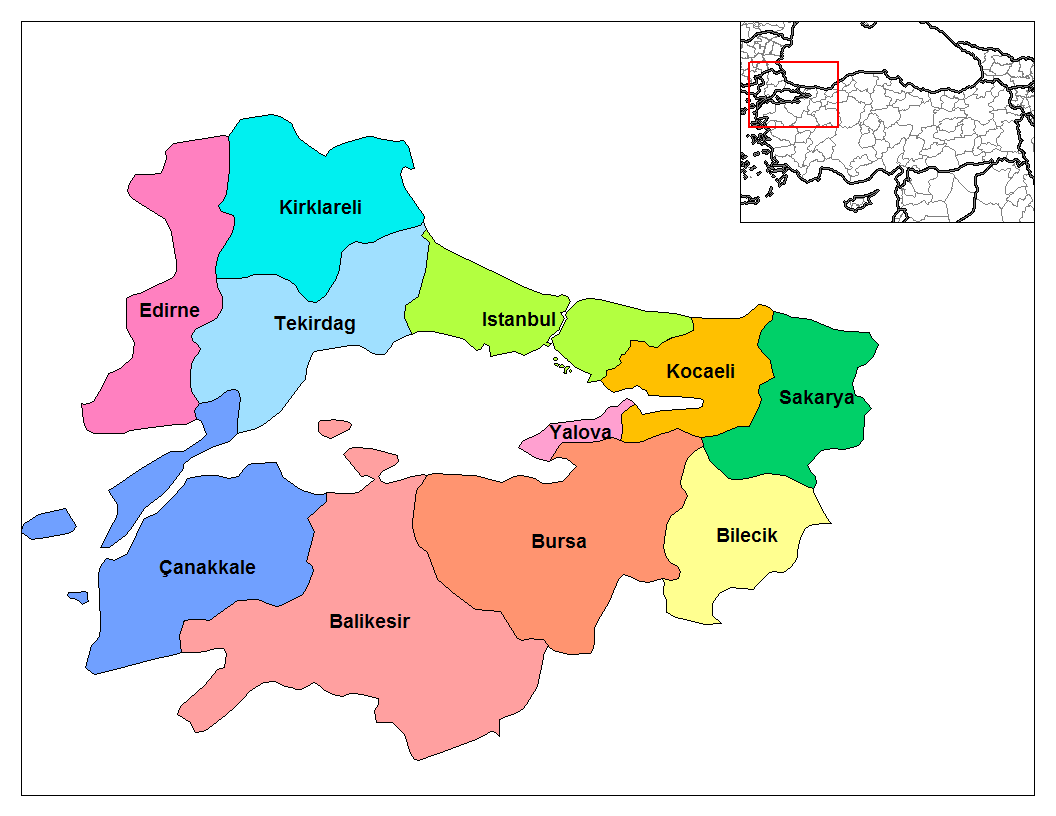
Marmara region, Turkey

A widespread power outage began at 13:43 local time (EET, UTC+2), 14 January to 27 April 2012 throughout parts of the Marmara region of Turkey.

The affected area included parts of Istanbul, the most densely populated city, and Kocaeli where the vast majority of the country's industry is located. The blackout knocked out metro and tram operation in Istanbul, 104 days fully restored.
