= 1999 Southern Brazil blackout =

Power outage

The 1999 Southern Brazil blackout was a widespread power outage (the largest ever at the time) that started in Brazil on 11 March 1999.

The blackout involved São Paulo, Rio de Janeiro, Minas Gerais, Goiás, Mato Grosso, Mato Grosso do Sul and Rio Grande do Sul, affecting an estimated 75 to 97 million people. A chain reaction was started when a lightning strike occurred at 22h 16m at an electricity substation in Bauru, São Paulo State causing most of the 440kV circuits at the substation to trip. Brazil was undergoing a severe investment crisis during 1999, which limited spending on maintenance and expansion of the power grid. With few routes for the power to flow from the generating stations via the 440kV system (a very important system to São Paulo state, carrying electricity generated by the Paraná river) many generators automatically shut down because they did not have any load. The world's biggest power plant at the time, Itaipu, tried to support the load that was no longer being supplied by the 440kV power plants, but the 750kV AC lines and the 600kV DC lines that connected the plant to the rest of the system could not take the load and tripped too.

South of São Paulo the consumers experienced an overfrequency, caused because they had more generation than load, mostly because Itaipu was now connected only to this sub-system, but that problem was automatically solved by all generators in the area, that reduced their loads.

The rest of the system experienced a much bigger problem, an underfrequency, since the system had a lot of load and not enough generation capacity. Some generators tripped because of the overfrequency, which aggravated the problem, and after an automatic rejection of 35% of the sub-system load the underfrequency did not go away. This caused the system to break in many pieces, São Paulo and Rio de Janeiro states were split with a few areas remaining online. Most of the Minas Gerais system remained online, and powered Brazil's capital, Brasília, as well as the state of Goias and some of Espirito Santo.

In Rio, the military police placed 1,200 men in the streets to avoid looting. In São Paulo, traffic authorities announced they closed the city's tunnels to prevent robberies. More than 60,000 people were on Rio's subway when lights went out.

At midnight, power began returning to some areas.

== See also ==
- List of major power outages
- Energy policy of Brazil
