= 2023 Pakistan blackout =

Power outage in Pakistan

- Date: 23 January 2023
- Time: 7:34 AM (02:34 GMT)
- Duration: More than 12 hours in the majority of impacted regions
- Location: Across Pakistan
- Cause: Reactive power deficiency overloaded transmission lines
- Property damage: Over PKR 100 billion in losses to the economy, including $70m losses in textile industry

The 2023 Pakistan blackout was a power outage that occurred across the entirety of Pakistan on 23 January 2023. This was the second major grid breakdown in Pakistan in 2 years, and the second largest blackout in history. In the majority of the regions, the blackout lasted about 12–13 hours while in some areas such as rural communities, it lasted even longer, ranging from 24 to 72 hour long outages.

Power was restored to the capital city, Islamabad, and its neighboring city, Rawalpindi, in about 8 hours. Lahore and Karachi received power after approximately 16 hours.

== Cause ==
The Energy Ministry issued a statement on Twitter that the system frequency of the national grid went down at 7:34 AM (02:34 GMT) on Monday morning. Officials stated that the outage began in southern Sindh Province after an unusual fluctuation in the voltage. The fluctuation led to a cascading failure at power plants across the country, until Pakistan was united in darkness.

According to NEPRA's official report, Pakistan's electric grid can be divided into two roughly-independent systems: a generation-rich system to the south, and a load-rich system to the north. The grid transfers excess energy between the two (typically south-to-north) along a small number of AC interties and a dedicated HVDC power line, which cannot deliver reactive power. Usually, Guddu thermal generator can generate reactive power at a key point intermediating the northern and southern system. Guddu was not operating at the time of the blackout for financial reasons, but grid dispatchers had not adjusted generation schedules to compensate.

The outage began around 7:30, when 500 MW of wind power plants in the south came on-line and replaced the Ghazi-Barother hydropower station. The Ghazi-Barotha shutdown removed substantial reactive power generation from the northern system, and the grid began to exhibit voltage-current oscillations as reactive power sloshed between the northern and southern systems. Already, this extra power flow loaded the AC interties beyond design limits. At 7:34:14.9 the HVDC inverter in Lahore lost sync with the grid ("commutation failure") and ceased to deliver power. That power instead flowed through the overloaded AC network, and protection relays acted to separate the northern and southern systems.

The northern island could not survive the loss of roughly 5 GW imported power (50% of load).

At first, the excess generation in the southern system only increased the utility frequency to 51.5 Hz. However, at that point Karachi Electric's 500 MW net load overeagerly islanded itself. Worse, Port Qasim unit #2 did not immediately trip off-line as expected, instead slowly throttling down. Other generators instead tripped to compensate for Port Qasim's continued power injection, but overshot, leaving the southern system now generation-deficient. Underfrequency load-shedding did not suffice to avert the decline as Port Qasim continued to throttle down, and frequency continued to decrease. When the remaining generators tripped off-line to protect their machinery from the low frequency, the system collapsed.

Meanwhile, the Karachi Electric system shed 600 MW of load on underfrequency to balance the missing 500 MW imports. However, the 100 MW net change also caused Bin Qasim unit #3 to trip offline, overloading the remaining generators.

Black start in the southern system proceeded rapidly, and initial power deliveries began within 2 hr of the blackout. Restoration of the northern system took substantially longer, because Tarbela hydroelectric station could not balance changes in local load. Poor operator training may have hindered Tarbela's ability to restore the system; NEPRA noted that the southern system's black start generator used a different control mode during system restoration than did the northern system's generators.

== Areas affected ==
According to the Power Minister of Pakistan, Khurram Dastgir Khan, the areas affected by power cuts included the major cities like Islamabad, Karachi, Lahore, Peshawar and Quetta, as well as dozens of small cities and towns. Almost 99% of Pakistan's population was in darkness around 9:30 PM (GMT+5) on January 23, 2023.

== Impact ==
The blackout hit the Internet and mobile phone services. Several companies and hospitals said they had switched to backup generators, but disruptions continued. The blackout also resulted in $70m in losses for its textile industry. People in different cities also complained of water shortages as water pumps, which run on electricity, were not working. Many ATMs also stopped working and people were unable to withdraw money due to no backup power.

== See also ==
- 2003 Northeast blackout – major blackout also caused by reactive power deficiency
- 2015 Turkey blackout – blackout with load very far from generators (before disturbance)
