= 2009 Brazil and Paraguay blackout =

Power outage

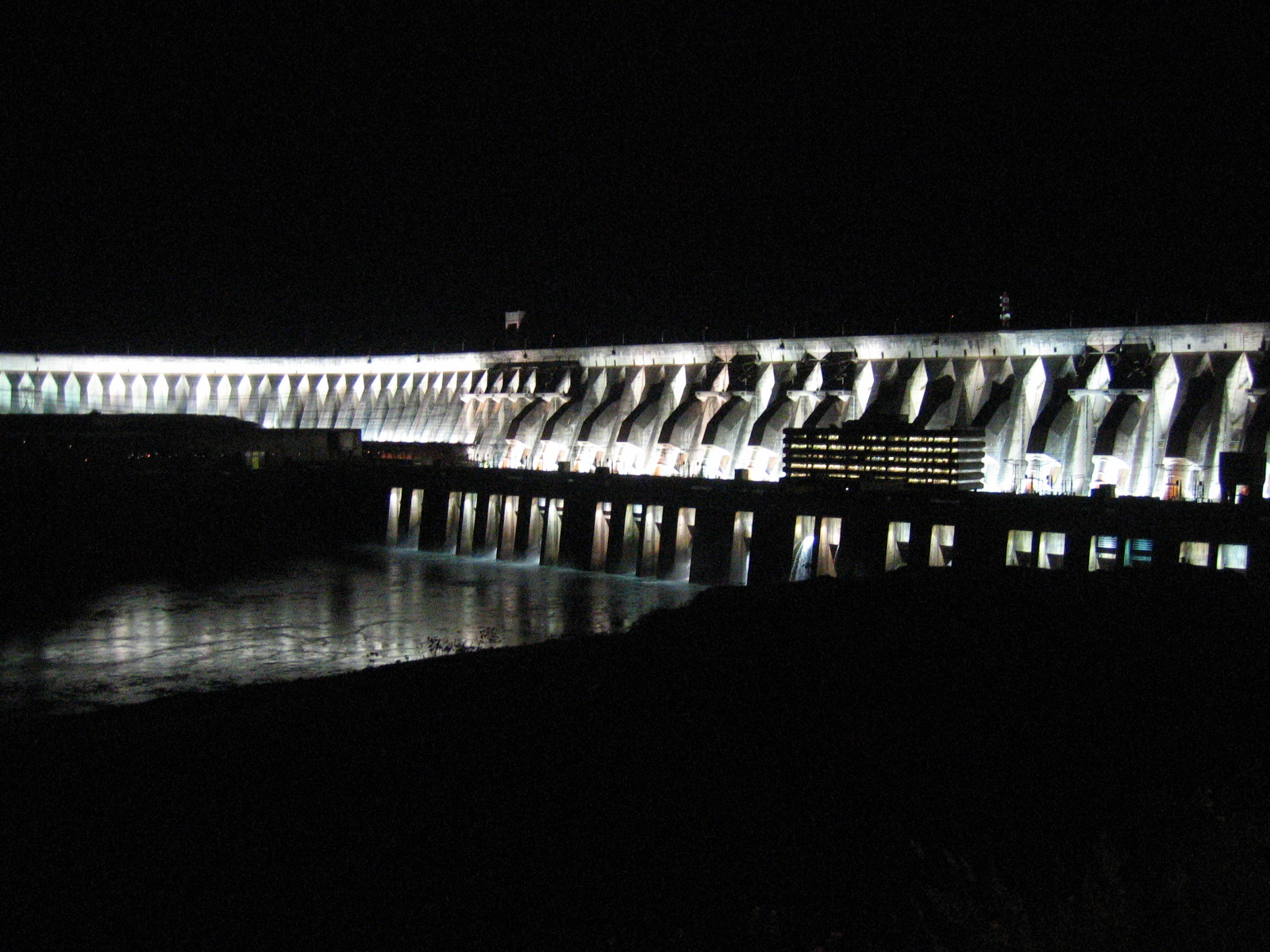
- Itaipu Dam, the world's largest hydroelectric plant by energy generation and second-largest by installed capacity
- Date: 10–20 November 2009
- Location: Most of Brazil and Paraguay
- Type: Power outage
- Cause: Meteorological events

The 2009 Brazil and Paraguay blackout was a power outage that occurred throughout much of Brazil and for a short time the entirety of Paraguay, on Tuesday, November 10, to Friday, 20 November, 2009, at approximately 22:15 BST. The blackout affected an estimated 60 million people in Brazil.

== Description ==
Thousands of passengers were stranded as metro trains came to a halt and buses failed to cope with the volume of passengers. There were widespread reports of road accidents as street lighting and traffic lights failed. The blackout began about 22:15 on Tuesday and lasted until about 02:45 on Wednesday in São Paulo, although power was restored gradually in some places from before midnight. At the time, the blackout raised fears that the country was unprepared for the 2014 World Cup.

In Paraguay, the blackout only lasted for about 20 minutes.

=== Causes ===
The southern Brazilian electric system relies heavily on multiple powerful hydroelectric plants along the Plate River and its tributaries. The power generated by those plants is then transmitted across the country through a network of high-voltage AC and DC transmission lines, but major loads in Rio de Janeiro and São Paulo are relatively close to the generators. Because geography constrains transmission line placement in the area, the Brazilian system is designed to handle multiple contingencies without failure, which may have prevented a worse blackout.

In the case of the blackout, heavy rains and strong winds caused all three phases on a key 750 kV transmission line from Itaipu to São Paulo to short circuit. The system protection temporarily isolated the line to allow the electrical arc to deionize, but an additional protective inductor device that attached with a time delay prevented the system from reconnecting the failed transmission line. Without the transmission line, additional transmission lines disconnected, automatically causing the complete loss of 14 GW of power and the shutdown of the Brazilian (60 Hz) side of the Itaipu Dam.

The power swing resulting from the change in generation also cause other generators to remove themselves from service, and then the loads in Rio de Janeiro and São Paulo overloaded the remaining (northbound) transmission lines. The power cut, which Brazilian officials said affected 18 of the country's 26 states, brought chaos to cities including São Paulo, Rio de Janeiro, Belo Horizonte, Campo Grande and Vitória.

When the HVDC transmission lines into Brazil failed, the power produced on the Paraguayan (50 Hz) side of Itaipu overloaded transmission lines into Paraguay. In such situations the lines are supposed to automatically disconnect, but that protection system failed and the lines remaining in service until they shorted out. The resulting frequency oscillations collapsed the Paraguayan electric system. Itaipu then shut down completely, for the first time in its 25-year history.

Restoration of the grid was delayed when multiple black start hydroelectric plants failed.

== Investigation ==
Media such as Slashdot and 60 Minutes reported that the outage was the work of hackers. Two days before, CBS had aired a special report, in which anonymous sources had claimed that hackers had caused Brazilian blackouts in 2005 and 2007.

President Luiz Inácio Lula da Silva arranged an emergency commission to enquire into the cause of the blackout. The blackout also unleashed a political stir as the Minister of Energy has been summoned to testify before Congress.

In December, 2010, a leaked US diplomatic cable confirmed that the blackouts had not been caused by a cyberattack.

== Affected regions ==
=== Paraguay ===
The Itaipu Dam is shared with Paraguay. In the immediate aftermath of its failure, interconnecting lines to Paraguay's other large powerplant, the Yacyreta Dam (in the border with Argentina), also failed. All of the country's territory was affected by the blackout.

=== Brazil ===
Map showing the locations in Brazil affected by the blackout Entirely affected states Partially affected states

Entirely affected states

- São Paulo
- Rio de Janeiro
- Mato Grosso do Sul
- Espírito Santo

Partially affected states

- Rio Grande do Sul
- Santa Catarina
- Paraná
- Minas Gerais
- Mato Grosso
- Goiás
- Rondônia
- Acre
- Bahia
- Sergipe
- Alagoas
- Pernambuco
- Paraíba
- Rio Grande do Norte

== See also ==
- List of power outages
- Electricity sector in Brazil
- Energy policy of Brazil
