= 1996 Western North America blackouts =

Power outages in the United States, Canada and Mexico

The 1996 Western North America blackouts were two widespread power outages that occurred across Western Canada, the Western United States, and Northwest Mexico on July 2 and August 10, 1996. They were separated by six weeks and were believed to have been similarly caused by excessive demand during a hot summer.

Though they affected millions, the blackouts were largely an inconvenience rather than emergencies. On both occasions, airport operations continued, and power was restored within minutes or hours.

The blackouts raised concerns about the then-recent debates regarding deregulating electricity utilities.

== July 2 blackout ==
On July 2, 1996, California and the coastal Pacific Northwest imported extensive hydropower from the inland Pacific Northwest and Canada and thermal power from the eastern Rockies. North American grid managers regularly simulate possible grid conditions to plan for contingencies, but had not investigated these particular long-range power flows. Although managers did not realize it, the system operated close to a dynamical singularity, and grid response to a small reactive power deficiency in the Idaho area would involve very large and very rapid voltage changes all across the system. A brief grounding and misconfigured relay then effected the deficiency, and protective devices separated large segments of the grid faster than operators could react. The power failure affected parts of Alberta and British Columbia in Canada, western Mexico, as well as Idaho, Montana, Utah, New Mexico, California, and Arizona, affecting more than two million people. Most power was restored in an hour or two.

The following day, transmission lines disconnected in a similar manner, but precautionary limits imposed on the transmission system following the July 2 blackout prevented cascading failure.

President Bill Clinton directed the United States Department of Energy to investigate the reasons for the widespread power outage and whether it could have been prevented.

== August 10 blackout ==
On August 10, 1996, the western electric grid experienced another massive blackout. Bonneville Power Administration had failed to adequately clear their right-of-way, and multiple lines arced to nearby vegetation. At 2:06 p.m., the Big Eddy-Ostrander line flashed and grounded to a tree. At 2:52 p.m., the John Day–Marion line (also owned by BPA) flashed to a tree. Due to a circuit breaker being out of service, this also took the Marion–Lane line out of operation. At 3:42 p.m., the Keeler–Allston line arced and grounded to a tree near Hillsboro, Oregon, west of Portland. It was the fourth power line in Oregon to fail in less than two hours. Five minutes later, at 3:47 p.m., the 230 kV Ross–Lexington line (also owned by Bonneville Power Administration) flashed and grounded to a tree near Vancouver, Washington, across the Columbia River from the Portland/Hillsboro area. This started a small fire. One minute later, at 3:48 p.m., the 13 turbines at McNary Dam, on the Columbia about 190 miles upstream from Portland, tripped off line.

Without the reactive power supplied by the McNary dam, the grid was susceptible to a large voltage-frequency oscillation. To the control circuits on the Pacific Intertie, the troughs of this standing wave appeared as though the Pacific Northwest had inadequate power generation, and the Intertie shut down, separating customers in the Pacific Southwest from power supplies to the north.

This power outage affected customers in seven western US states, two Canadian provinces, and Baja California, Mexico. Approximately 7.5 million customers lost power for periods ranging from several minutes to six hours. The outage stretched from Canada to New Mexico and knocked out power to 4 million customers amid a triple-digit heat wave.

== See also ==
- List of power outages
- 1996 Malaysia blackout
