= K-Electric Bin Qasim Power Station =

Thermal power station in Pakistan

Coordinates: 24.7850330°N 67.3606431°E

K-Electric Bin Qasim Power Station (BQPS) is a thermal power plant fueled by natural gas and fuel oil located near Port Bin Qasim, Karachi, Sindh, Pakistan.

It consists of two units, BQPS-1 and BQPS-2.
