= 2022 Bangladesh blackout =

Major power outage in Bangladesh

- Date: 4 October 2022
- Duration: almost 7 hours
- Location: Dhaka and other big cities
- Type: Blackout

The 2022 Bangladesh blackout was a power outage that occurred across Bangladesh on October 4, 2022. The blackout lasted for almost 7 hours.

== Cause ==
According to Bangladesh Power Development Board, the power grid of the country malfunctioned at around 2pm (08:00 GMT) on October 4, 2022.

== Areas affected ==
Due to the blackout, all power plants tripped and electricity was cut in the capital Dhaka and other big cities. Between 75 and 80 per cent electricity supply was suspended during the blackout.

== Impact ==
The blackout affected operations of the Bangladesh's lucrative export-oriented garment industry. According to the Bangladesh Garment Manufacturers and Exporters Association, they had to shut their offices because the generators were not able to run for long periods.
