= Naseerabad, Balochistan =

Town in Balochistan, Pakistan

Coordinates: 28°12′08″N 67°54′31″E

Naseerabad (Urdu: نصِیر آباد) Naseerabad District lies in the Pakistani province of Balochistan, its headquarters are at Dera Murad Jamali.
