= List of Turkish provinces by life expectancy =

Turkey is administratively divided into 81 provinces.

According to estimation of the Turkish Statistical Institute (TurkStat), life expectancy at birth in Turkey in period 2021–2023 was 77.3 years (74.7 years for male and 80.0 years for female).
Healthy life expectancy for this period was 57.6 years (59.0 years for male and 56.3 years for female).

According to alternative estimation of the United Nations, in 2023 life expectancy in Turkey was 77.2 years total (74.5 for male, 79.9 for female).

Estimation of the World Bank Group is similar: 77.2 years (74.5 for male, 79.9 for female).

Estimation of Eurostat for 2023: 77.3 years total (74.8 for male, 79.8 for female).

According to estimation of the WHO for 2019, at that year life expectancy in Turkey was 77.62 years (75.09 years for male and 80.13 years for female).
And healthy life expectancy was 67.24 years (66.63 years for male and 67.80 years for female).

In 2015–17, the difference in life expectancy between the most prosperous and disadvantaged provinces was 4.55 years.
In 2018–20, this difference was 4.69 years.
In 2021–23, this difference was 4.71 years.

== TurkStat (2021–2023) ==
By default the table is sorted by 2021–2023. The values are rounded. All calculations were made with raw data.

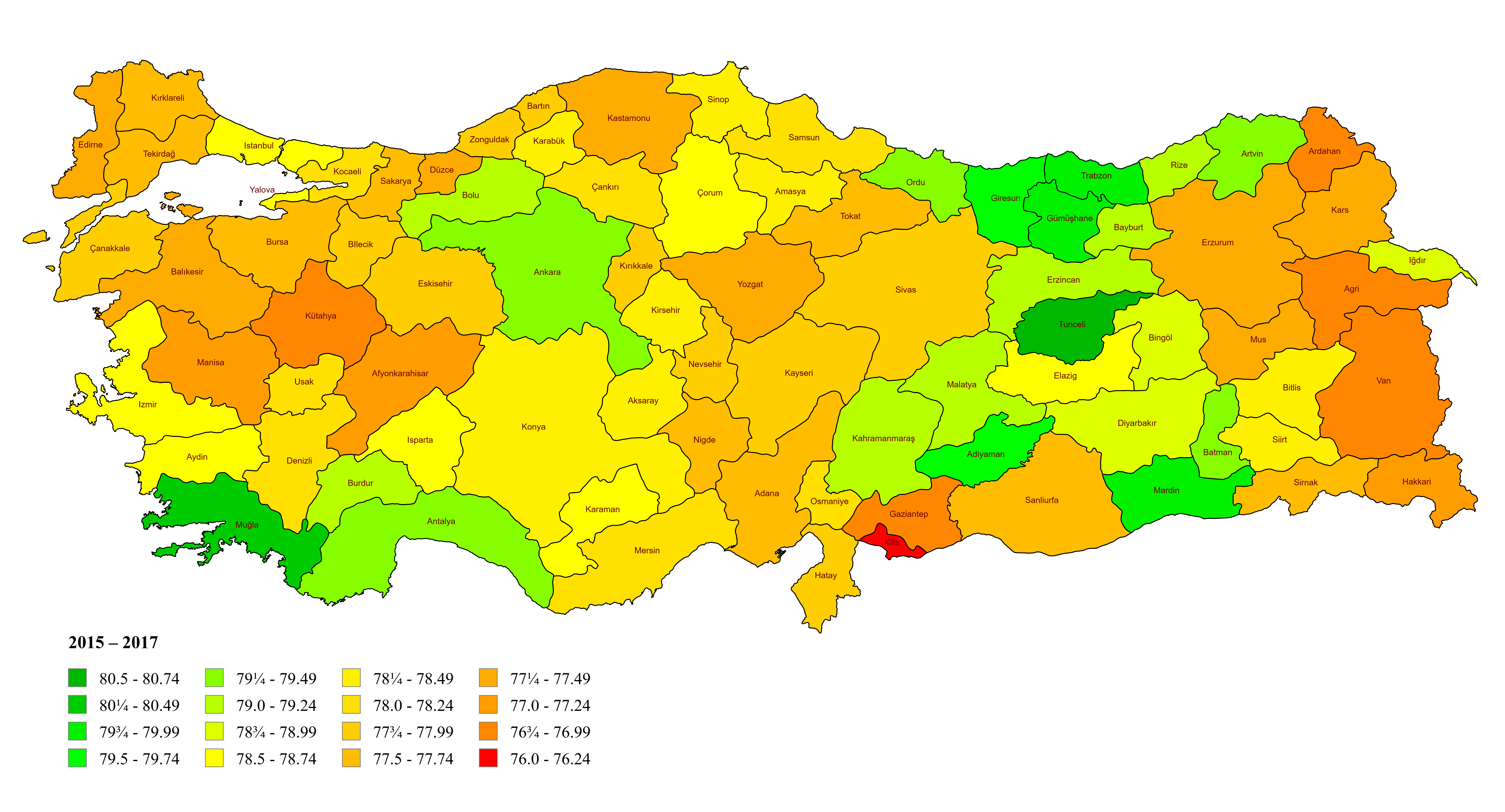
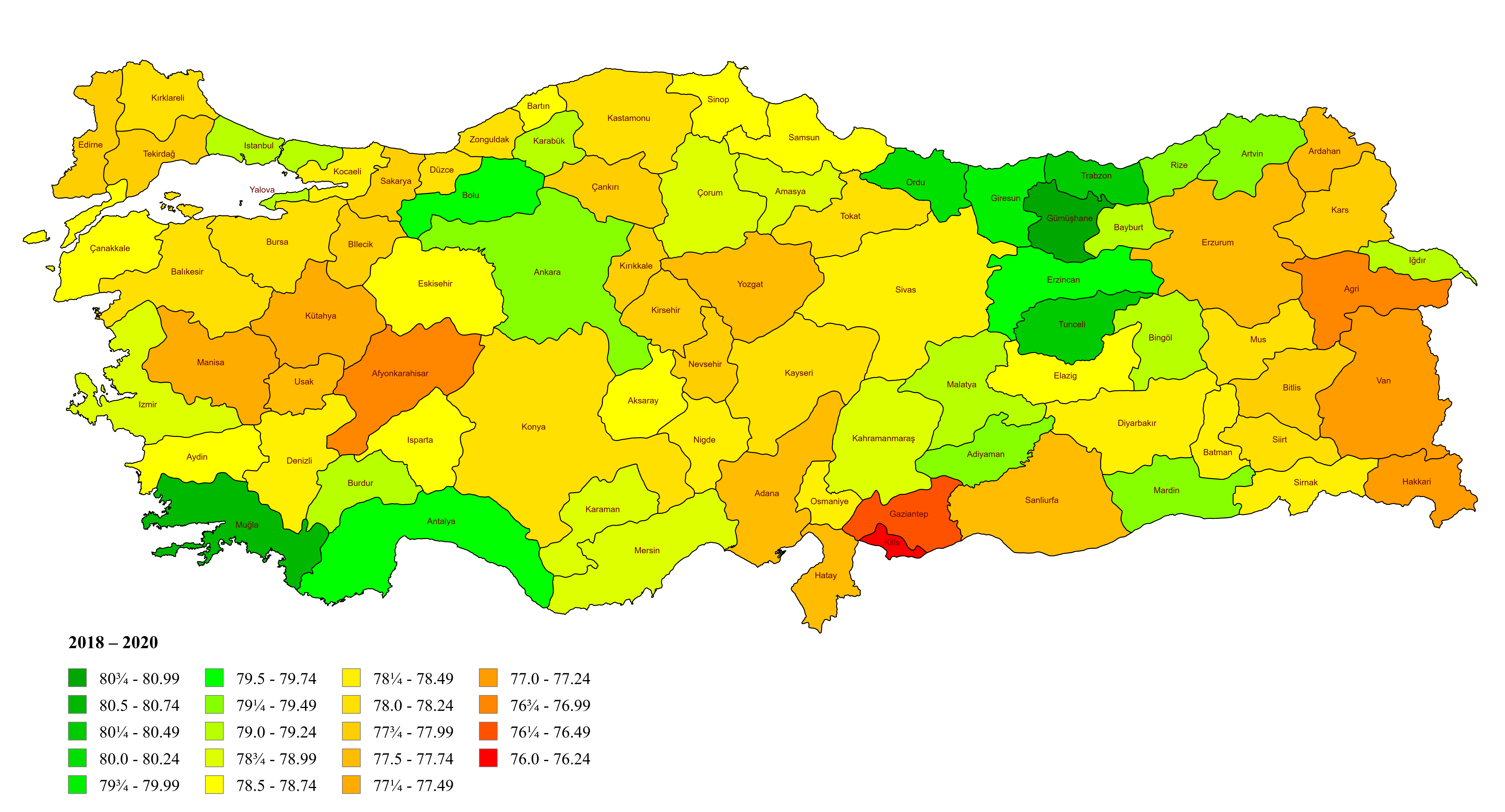
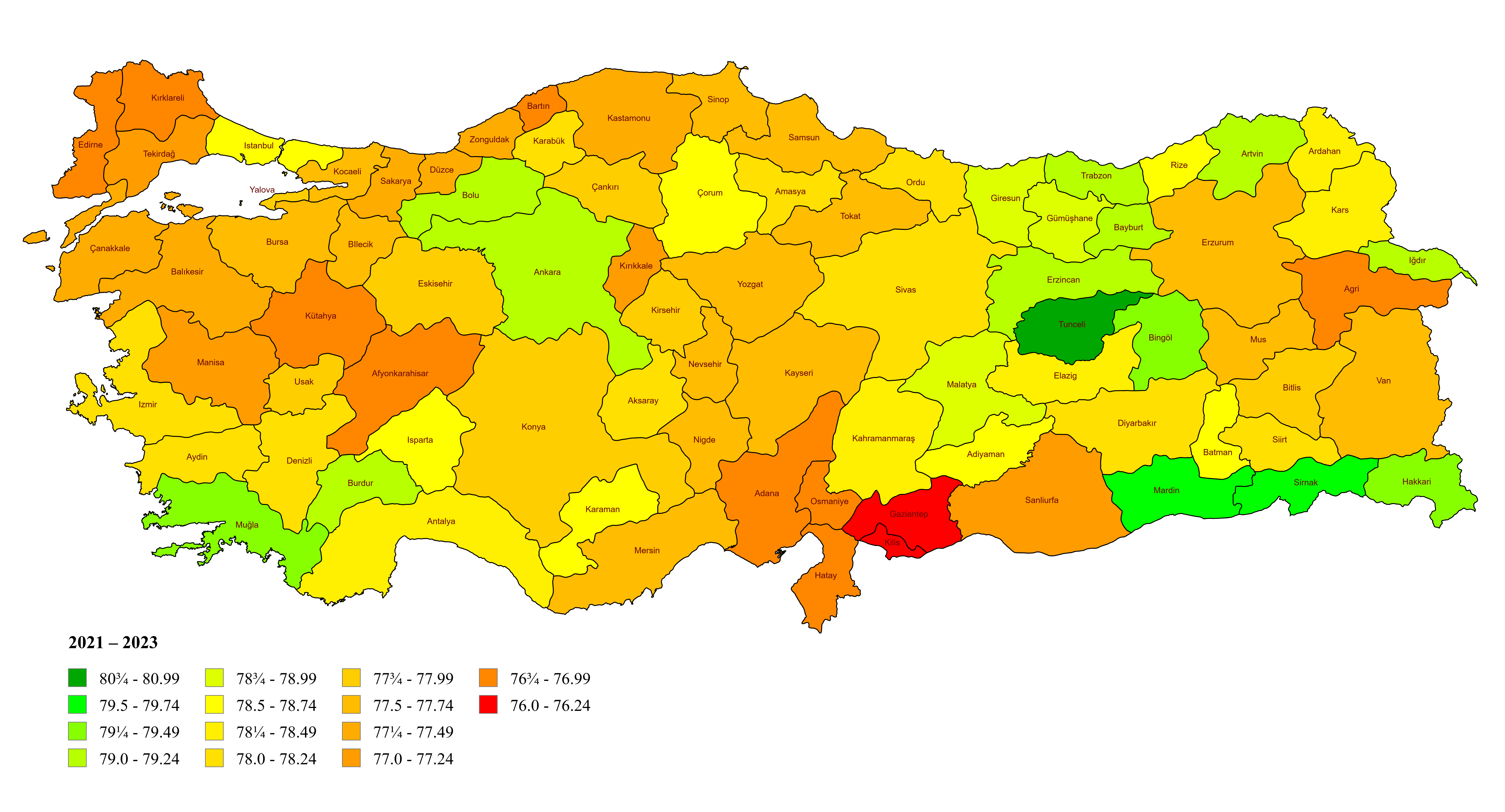
Provinces (ils) of Turkey by life expectancy in 2015–2017, 2018–2020, and 2021–2023

province	2015–2017				change 1	2018–2020				change 2	2021–2023				change cumulative
province	overall	male	female	F Δ M	change 1	overall	male	female	F Δ M	change 2	overall	male	female	F Δ M	change cumulative
Turkey	78.00	75.30	80.80	5.50	0.33	78.33	75.60	81.12	5.52	−1.02	77.31	74.73	79.96	5.23	−0.69
Tunceli	80.69	77.41	84.25	6.84	−0.36	80.33	77.01	84.06	7.05	0.46	80.79	78.11	83.61	5.50	0.10
Şırnak	77.62	73.36	81.84	8.48	0.70	78.32	74.44	82.30	7.86	1.34	79.66	75.94	83.28	7.34	2.04
Mardin	79.83	76.85	82.71	5.85	−0.51	79.32	76.73	81.84	5.11	0.33	79.65	77.10	82.11	5.02	−0.18
Bingöl	78.84	76.01	81.82	5.81	0.34	79.18	76.50	82.09	5.59	0.12	79.30	76.95	81.73	4.78	0.47
Muğla	80.28	77.59	83.18	5.59	0.42	80.70	77.75	83.96	6.22	−1.41	79.29	76.38	82.53	6.15	−0.99
Hakkâri	77.12	74.13	80.00	5.87	0.05	77.17	74.27	80.07	5.80	2.09	79.26	76.27	82.17	5.90	2.14
Ankara	79.36	76.69	81.94	5.25	−0.06	79.29	76.55	82.02	5.47	−0.10	79.19	76.53	81.80	5.27	−0.17
Erzincan	79.19	76.07	82.47	6.40	0.42	79.60	76.91	82.34	5.43	−0.46	79.14	76.66	81.70	5.03	−0.05
Bolu	79.15	76.51	81.79	5.28	0.37	79.52	77.01	82.04	5.03	−0.43	79.09	76.61	81.59	4.97	−0.06
Bayburt	79.08	76.26	82.19	5.93	0.14	79.22	77.05	81.40	4.36	−0.14	79.08	76.28	82.08	5.79	0.00
Artvin	79.35	76.27	82.65	6.38	0.11	79.46	76.37	82.75	6.38	−0.41	79.06	76.33	81.94	5.61	−0.29
Iğdır	78.83	75.82	81.98	6.16	0.28	79.11	76.39	81.96	5.57	−0.06	79.06	76.53	81.72	5.18	0.23
Trabzon	80.00	76.48	83.37	6.90	0.29	80.29	76.77	83.79	7.02	−1.24	79.04	75.98	82.10	6.13	−0.95
Burdur	79.17	76.10	82.28	6.18	−0.04	79.13	75.99	82.38	6.39	−0.13	79.00	76.02	82.04	6.02	−0.17
Giresun	79.67	76.32	83.07	6.75	0.32	79.99	76.63	83.51	6.88	−1.02	78.97	75.76	82.39	6.62	−0.70
Gümüşhane	79.77	76.25	83.46	7.20	1.01	80.78	78.07	83.54	5.47	−1.95	78.83	75.77	82.02	6.25	−0.95
Malatya	79.02	76.05	82.06	6.01	0.01	79.02	76.16	81.98	5.82	−0.21	78.81	76.10	81.59	5.48	−0.21
Adıyaman	79.71	77.27	82.12	4.85	−0.42	79.29	76.94	81.67	4.73	−0.60	78.69	76.40	81.04	4.64	−1.02
Çorum	78.63	75.90	81.47	5.57	0.21	78.85	76.20	81.57	5.37	−0.19	78.66	76.05	81.36	5.31	0.02
Isparta	78.70	76.09	81.32	5.24	−0.03	78.66	75.92	81.47	5.55	−0.02	78.65	75.99	81.32	5.33	−0.05
Batman	79.29	76.10	82.27	6.18	−0.81	78.48	75.37	81.54	6.18	0.13	78.62	75.94	81.14	5.19	−0.67
Rize	79.01	74.82	83.18	8.36	0.39	79.40	75.55	83.27	7.72	−0.83	78.57	74.92	82.33	7.41	−0.44
Istanbul	78.70	75.79	81.55	5.75	0.38	79.08	76.20	81.95	5.75	−0.52	78.56	75.84	81.27	5.43	−0.13
Karaman	78.72	76.40	81.07	4.67	0.05	78.77	76.05	81.60	5.55	−0.25	78.52	76.02	81.11	5.09	−0.20
Kars	77.34	75.09	79.74	4.65	0.43	77.78	75.05	80.80	5.74	0.71	78.49	76.13	81.02	4.90	1.14
Ardahan	76.93	74.21	79.91	5.70	0.69	77.62	74.78	80.86	6.08	0.83	78.45	75.86	81.40	5.54	1.52
Elazığ	78.63	75.94	81.34	5.40	0.09	78.72	76.06	81.42	5.36	−0.33	78.39	76.05	80.72	4.66	−0.24
Antalya	79.30	76.66	82.11	5.45	0.44	79.73	77.26	82.38	5.12	−1.36	78.37	75.84	81.12	5.28	−0.93
Kahramanmaraş	79.24	77.04	81.53	4.49	−0.38	78.86	76.59	81.31	4.71	−0.58	78.28	76.26	80.42	4.16	−0.96
Ordu	79.29	76.18	82.56	6.38	0.75	80.04	77.23	82.97	5.75	−1.79	78.25	75.46	81.22	5.76	−1.05
Siirt	78.37	75.24	81.40	6.16	−0.35	78.02	74.71	81.56	6.85	0.19	78.21	75.51	80.82	5.31	−0.16
Amasya	78.47	75.72	81.26	5.54	0.53	78.99	76.29	81.76	5.46	−0.88	78.11	75.38	80.93	5.55	−0.35
İzmir	78.65	75.77	81.58	5.82	0.34	78.99	76.04	82.01	5.97	−0.88	78.11	75.17	81.14	5.96	−0.54
Diyarbakır	78.91	75.67	82.03	6.36	−0.43	78.48	75.48	81.51	6.03	−0.38	78.10	75.49	80.65	5.17	−0.81
Denizli	78.17	75.32	81.07	5.74	0.31	78.48	75.70	81.32	5.62	−0.40	78.08	75.31	80.94	5.62	−0.09
Sivas	77.97	75.42	80.65	5.23	0.49	78.46	75.91	81.16	5.25	−0.38	78.08	75.58	80.72	5.14	0.11
Aydın	78.53	75.47	81.76	6.29	0.04	78.57	75.54	81.78	6.24	−0.52	78.05	75.27	80.99	5.72	−0.48
Aksaray	78.32	75.68	80.88	5.20	0.19	78.51	75.52	81.51	5.99	−0.48	78.03	75.30	80.74	5.44	−0.29
Karabük	78.40	75.38	81.55	6.18	0.67	79.07	76.24	82.00	5.76	−1.06	78.01	75.30	80.79	5.48	−0.39
Çankırı	78.03	75.39	80.81	5.42	−0.25	77.78	75.17	80.56	5.39	0.18	77.96	75.38	80.66	5.28	−0.08
Eskişehir	77.98	75.24	80.78	5.54	0.56	78.54	75.84	81.29	5.45	−0.64	77.90	75.29	80.55	5.26	−0.08
Yalova	78.61	75.89	81.46	5.57	0.60	79.21	76.29	82.29	6.00	−1.32	77.89	75.06	80.94	5.88	−0.72
Konya	78.33	75.76	80.86	5.10	−0.20	78.13	75.45	80.83	5.37	−0.31	77.82	75.24	80.41	5.17	−0.50
Uşak	78.11	75.92	80.31	4.39	−0.46	77.65	74.93	80.46	5.53	0.15	77.80	75.03	80.67	5.64	−0.31
Bitlis	78.40	75.64	81.06	5.42	−0.61	77.79	74.82	80.95	6.13	0.01	77.80	75.23	80.48	5.25	−0.60
Kırşehir	78.46	75.44	81.45	6.00	−0.62	77.84	74.89	80.77	5.88	−0.04	77.80	75.01	80.62	5.61	−0.66
Kayseri	77.87	75.31	80.44	5.14	0.37	78.24	75.66	80.86	5.20	−0.53	77.71	75.16	80.31	5.15	−0.16
Sinop	78.41	75.32	81.71	6.39	0.21	78.61	75.68	81.75	6.07	−0.91	77.70	74.96	80.67	5.71	−0.70
Bursa	77.68	75.01	80.42	5.42	0.56	78.24	75.52	81.05	5.53	−0.54	77.69	75.10	80.36	5.26	0.01
Erzurum	77.29	74.90	79.70	4.80	0.29	77.58	75.36	79.84	4.47	0.11	77.69	75.34	80.09	4.75	0.40
Nevşehir	77.85	75.45	80.17	4.72	0.06	77.91	75.03	80.83	5.79	−0.23	77.68	75.43	79.89	4.46	−0.17
Mersin	78.23	75.49	81.06	5.57	0.68	78.91	76.33	81.58	5.25	−1.24	77.67	74.91	80.58	5.67	−0.56
Van	76.96	74.44	79.53	5.09	0.13	77.10	74.90	79.32	4.42	0.55	77.64	75.49	79.83	4.34	0.68
Kocaeli	78.08	75.73	80.53	4.80	0.30	78.38	75.82	81.08	5.25	−0.76	77.63	75.21	80.16	4.95	−0.46
Tokat	77.52	74.94	80.16	5.22	0.57	78.09	75.52	80.75	5.22	−0.49	77.60	75.13	80.16	5.04	0.08
Bilecik	77.83	74.99	80.77	5.78	0.02	77.85	75.36	80.47	5.11	−0.25	77.60	74.88	80.48	5.60	−0.23
Muş	77.45	74.71	80.10	5.39	0.58	78.03	75.44	80.64	5.20	−0.44	77.59	75.25	79.93	4.68	0.14
Yozgat	77.48	74.75	80.29	5.55	0.24	77.73	74.85	80.74	5.89	−0.15	77.58	74.82	80.52	5.70	0.09
Samsun	78.07	75.04	81.15	6.11	0.48	78.55	75.55	81.67	6.12	−1.00	77.55	74.94	80.23	5.30	−0.51
Niğde	77.63	74.69	80.61	5.92	0.67	78.30	75.36	81.28	5.92	−0.77	77.53	74.46	80.71	6.25	−0.09
Çanakkale	77.99	75.13	81.02	5.88	0.66	78.65	75.56	81.95	6.39	−1.15	77.50	74.56	80.66	6.10	−0.49
Zonguldak	77.81	75.12	80.49	5.37	0.39	78.20	75.48	80.96	5.48	−0.75	77.45	74.94	79.99	5.06	−0.36
Düzce	77.49	74.49	80.69	6.20	0.55	78.04	75.19	81.06	5.87	−0.67	77.38	74.62	80.29	5.67	−0.12
Sakarya	77.51	74.79	80.34	5.55	0.35	77.85	75.16	80.69	5.53	−0.48	77.37	74.80	80.08	5.28	−0.14
Kastamonu	77.36	74.51	80.32	5.81	0.66	78.02	75.03	81.16	6.14	−0.67	77.34	74.46	80.40	5.94	−0.02
Balıkesir	77.50	74.65	80.49	5.84	0.53	78.02	75.07	81.17	6.11	−0.76	77.26	74.47	80.23	5.76	−0.23
Kırıkkale	77.78	74.89	80.78	5.89	0.15	77.93	75.17	80.80	5.63	−0.73	77.20	74.33	80.19	5.86	−0.58
Tekirdağ	77.58	74.93	80.43	5.50	0.19	77.77	75.01	80.77	5.76	−0.63	77.14	74.59	79.87	5.28	−0.44
Manisa	77.10	74.39	79.90	5.51	0.27	77.37	74.53	80.35	5.82	−0.29	77.08	74.35	79.94	5.59	−0.02
Şanlıurfa	77.73	74.60	80.71	6.11	−0.16	77.57	74.48	80.62	6.14	−0.54	77.03	74.14	79.85	5.72	−0.70
Osmaniye	78.01	75.29	80.81	5.53	0.46	78.47	76.08	80.91	4.82	−1.49	76.98	74.32	79.79	5.47	−1.03
Bartın	77.89	75.64	80.16	4.52	0.61	78.50	75.68	81.45	5.77	−1.53	76.98	74.25	79.82	5.58	−0.92
Afyonkarahisar	77.07	74.54	79.64	5.10	−0.11	76.96	74.28	79.73	5.45	−0.01	76.95	74.51	79.45	4.94	−0.12
Kırklareli	77.68	74.64	80.96	6.32	0.36	78.03	74.95	81.37	6.43	−1.11	76.92	73.97	80.18	6.20	−0.75
Kütahya	76.79	74.50	79.10	4.60	0.67	77.46	75.04	79.94	4.90	−0.54	76.92	74.67	79.19	4.51	0.13
Edirne	77.35	74.24	80.69	6.45	0.59	77.95	74.79	81.36	6.57	−1.04	76.90	74.00	80.03	6.04	−0.45
Hatay	77.93	75.74	80.17	4.43	−0.28	77.65	75.42	79.97	4.55	−0.77	76.88	74.69	79.19	4.50	−1.05
Ağrı	76.77	74.25	79.35	5.10	0.00	76.78	74.11	79.65	5.54	0.08	76.86	74.46	79.39	4.94	0.09
Adana	77.53	74.70	80.38	5.67	0.13	77.66	74.91	80.47	5.56	−0.90	76.76	74.00	79.58	5.57	−0.77
Gaziantep	76.94	74.33	79.52	5.20	−0.56	76.38	73.80	79.03	5.24	−0.22	76.15	73.63	78.72	5.09	−0.78
Kilis	76.14	72.87	79.55	6.67	−0.05	76.09	73.47	78.83	5.37	−0.01	76.08	73.17	79.13	5.96	−0.06

Source: TurkStat

== Eurostat (2014—2023) ==
By default the table is sorted by 2023.

code	region	2014				2014 →2019	2019				2019 →2023	2023				2014 →2023
code	region	overall	male	female	F Δ M	2014 →2019	overall	male	female	F Δ M	2019 →2023	overall	male	female	F Δ M	2014 →2023
	Turkey on average	78.1	75.4	80.9	5.5	1.0	79.1	76.4	81.8	5.4	−1.8	77.3	74.8	79.8	5.0	−0.8
TR90	Trabzon region: Trabzon, Ordu, Giresun, Rize, Artvin, Gümüşhane	79.7	76.1	83.3	7.2	1.0	80.7	77.5	83.8	6.3	−3.2	77.5	75.6	79.6	4.0	−2.2
TRA1	Erzurum region: Erzurum, Erzincan, Bayburt	78.0	75.5	80.5	5.0	1.1	79.1	76.9	81.4	4.5	−1.9	77.2	75.5	78.9	3.4	−0.8
TR51	Ankara	79.4	76.8	82.0	5.2	0.5	79.9	77.2	82.5	5.3	−2.7	77.2	75.4	79.1	3.7	−2.2
TR10	Istanbul	78.5	75.5	81.3	5.8	1.1	79.6	76.9	82.2	5.3	−2.5	77.1	75.2	79.0	3.8	−1.4
TR61	Antalya region: Antalya, Isparta, Burdur	79.3	76.7	81.9	5.2	0.6	79.9	77.4	82.5	5.1	−2.8	77.1	75.1	79.0	3.9	−2.2
TRC3	Mardin region: Mardin, Batman, Şırnak, Siirt	—	—	—	—	—	80.1	77.4	82.7	5.3	−3.1	77.0	75.3	78.6	3.3	—
TR82	Kastamonu region: Kastamonu, Çankırı, Sinop	78.0	75.2	80.9	5.7	1.2	79.2	76.3	82.3	6.0	−2.2	77.0	75.2	78.9	3.7	−1.0
TR32	Aydın region: Aydın, Denizli, Muğla	79.5	76.7	82.4	5.7	0.0	79.5	76.9	82.3	5.4	−2.5	77.0	74.9	79.2	4.3	−2.5
TRA2	Ağrı region: Ağrı, Kars, Iğdır, Ardahan	76.7	74.4	79.2	4.8	1.9	78.6	75.9	81.6	5.7	−1.7	76.9	75.2	78.6	3.4	0.2
TR42	Kocaeli region: Kocaeli, Sakarya, Düzce, Bolu, Yalova	78.0	75.5	80.7	5.2	0.8	78.8	76.3	81.4	5.1	−2.0	76.8	74.9	78.8	3.9	−1.2
TR83	Samsun region: Samsun, Tokat, Çorum, Amasya	77.9	75.2	80.7	5.5	1.2	79.1	76.4	82.0	5.6	−2.3	76.8	74.8	78.8	4.0	−1.1
TR72	Kayseri region: Kayseri, Sivas, Yozgat	77.9	75.4	80.5	5.1	1.2	79.1	76.7	81.6	4.9	−2.4	76.7	74.8	78.6	3.8	−1.2
TR41	Bursa region: Bursa, Eskişehir, Bilecik	77.6	75.1	80.1	5.0	1.2	78.8	76.3	81.3	5.0	−2.2	76.6	74.7	78.6	3.9	−1.0
TR52	Konya region: Konya, Karaman	78.1	75.6	80.6	5.0	1.1	79.2	76.6	81.8	5.2	−2.6	76.6	74.6	78.6	4.0	−1.5
TR71	Kırıkkale region: Kırıkkale, Aksaray, Niğde, Nevşehir, Kırşehir	77.7	75.0	80.4	5.4	1.0	78.7	76.1	81.2	5.1	−2.1	76.6	74.6	78.6	4.0	−1.1
TR31	İzmir	78.7	75.7	81.8	6.1	0.5	79.2	76.4	82.0	5.6	−2.6	76.6	74.3	78.9	4.6	−2.1
TR81	Zonguldak region: Zonguldak, Karabük, Bartın	78.0	75.2	80.8	5.6	1.1	79.1	76.7	81.5	4.8	−2.6	76.5	74.6	78.6	4.0	−1.5
TR22	Balıkesir region: Balıkesir, Çanakkale	77.8	74.9	80.8	5.9	0.7	78.5	75.6	81.5	5.9	−2.1	76.4	74.0	78.8	4.8	−1.4
TRB2	Van region: Van, Muş, Bitlis, Hakkâri	76.9	74.2	79.6	5.4	1.7	78.6	76.3	80.9	4.6	−2.3	76.3	74.9	77.8	2.9	−0.6
TR33	Manisa region: Manisa, Afyonkarahisar, Kütahya, Uşak	77.1	74.4	79.8	5.4	0.8	77.9	75.2	80.7	5.5	−1.8	76.1	74.1	78.2	4.1	−1.0
TR21	Tekirdağ region: Tekirdağ, Edirne, Kırklareli	77.3	74.4	80.4	6.0	1.1	78.4	75.6	81.4	5.8	−2.4	76.0	73.9	78.3	4.4	−1.3
TRB1	Malatya region: Malatya, Elazığ, Bingöl, Tunceli	78.8	76.2	81.4	5.2	1.2	80.0	77.4	82.7	5.3	−4.6	75.4	73.9	76.9	3.0	−3.4
TR62	Adana region: Adana, Mersin	77.9	75.1	80.7	5.6	0.7	78.6	76.0	81.3	5.3	−3.3	75.3	73.2	77.4	4.2	−2.6
TRC2	Şanlıurfa region: Şanlıurfa, Diyarbakır	77.9	74.7	81.1	6.4	0.8	78.7	75.6	81.7	6.1	−3.5	75.2	73.4	77.0	3.6	−2.7
TRC1	Gaziantep region: Gaziantep, Adıyaman, Kilis	77.4	74.7	80.1	5.4	0.4	77.8	75.2	80.3	5.1	−12.6	65.2	64.3	66.0	1.7	−12.2
TR63	Hatay region: Hatay, Kahramanmaraş, Osmaniye	78.3	76.1	80.6	4.5	0.7	79.0	77.0	81.0	4.0	−23.6	55.4	55.4	55.5	0.1	−22.9

Data source: Eurostat

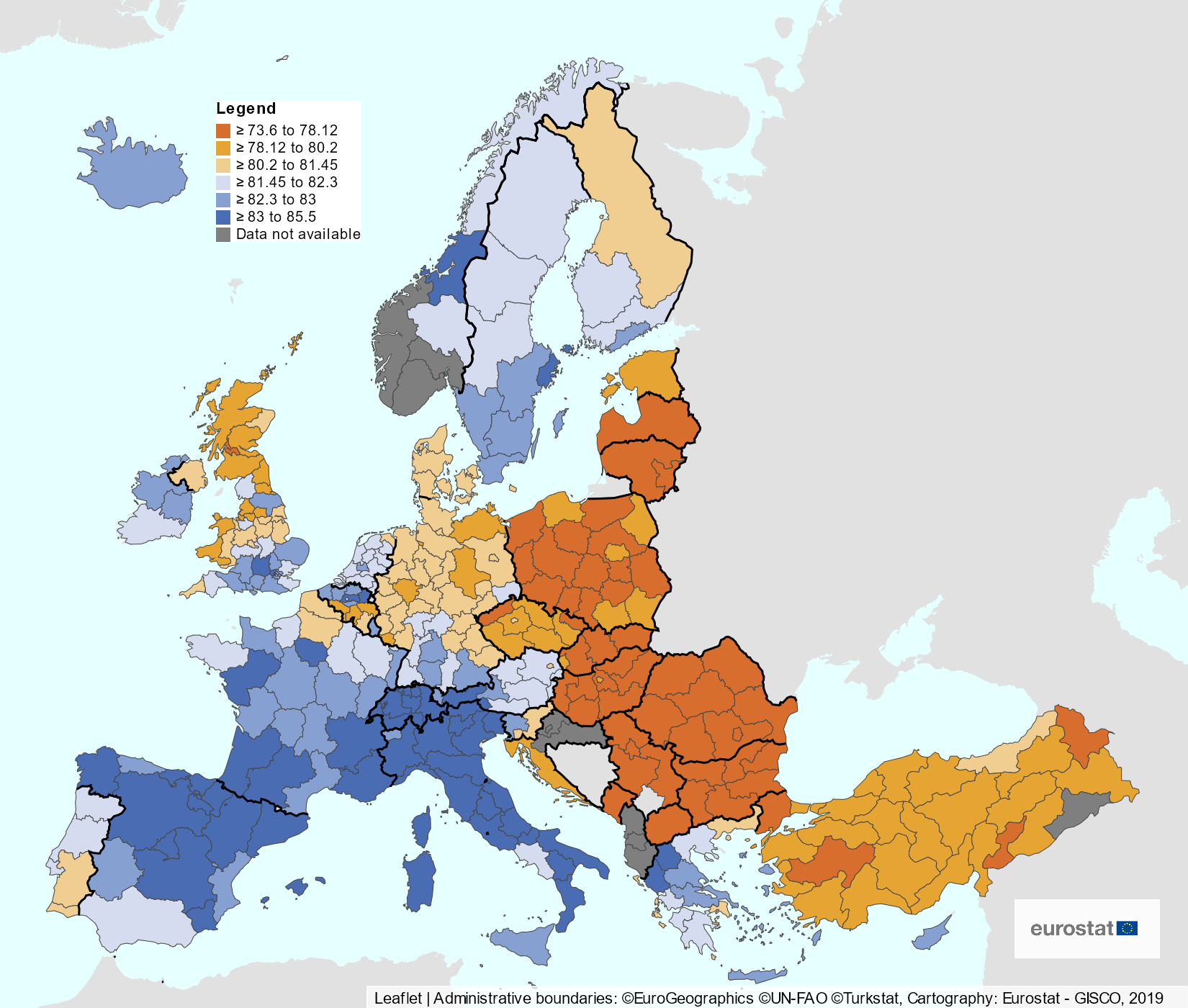
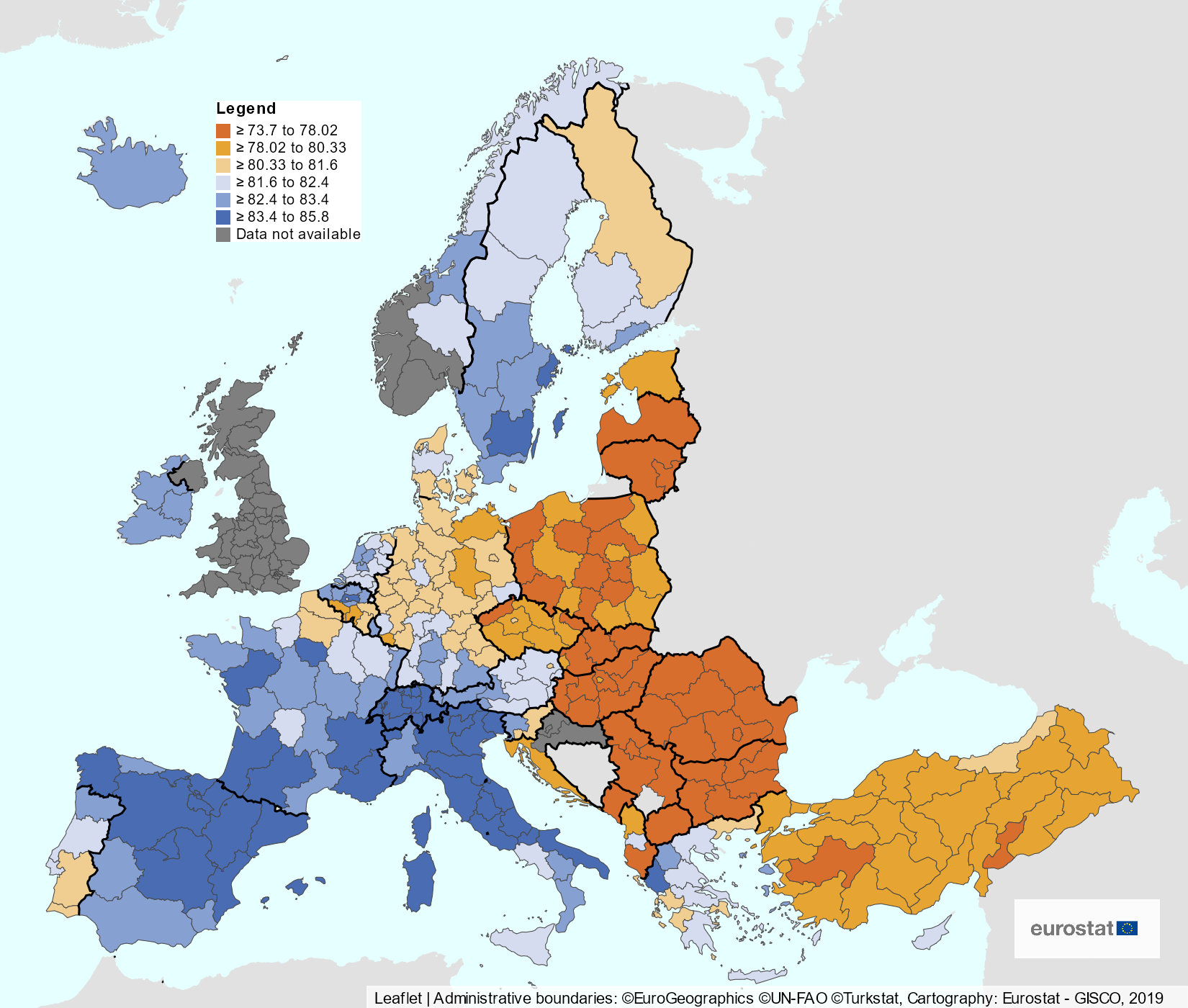
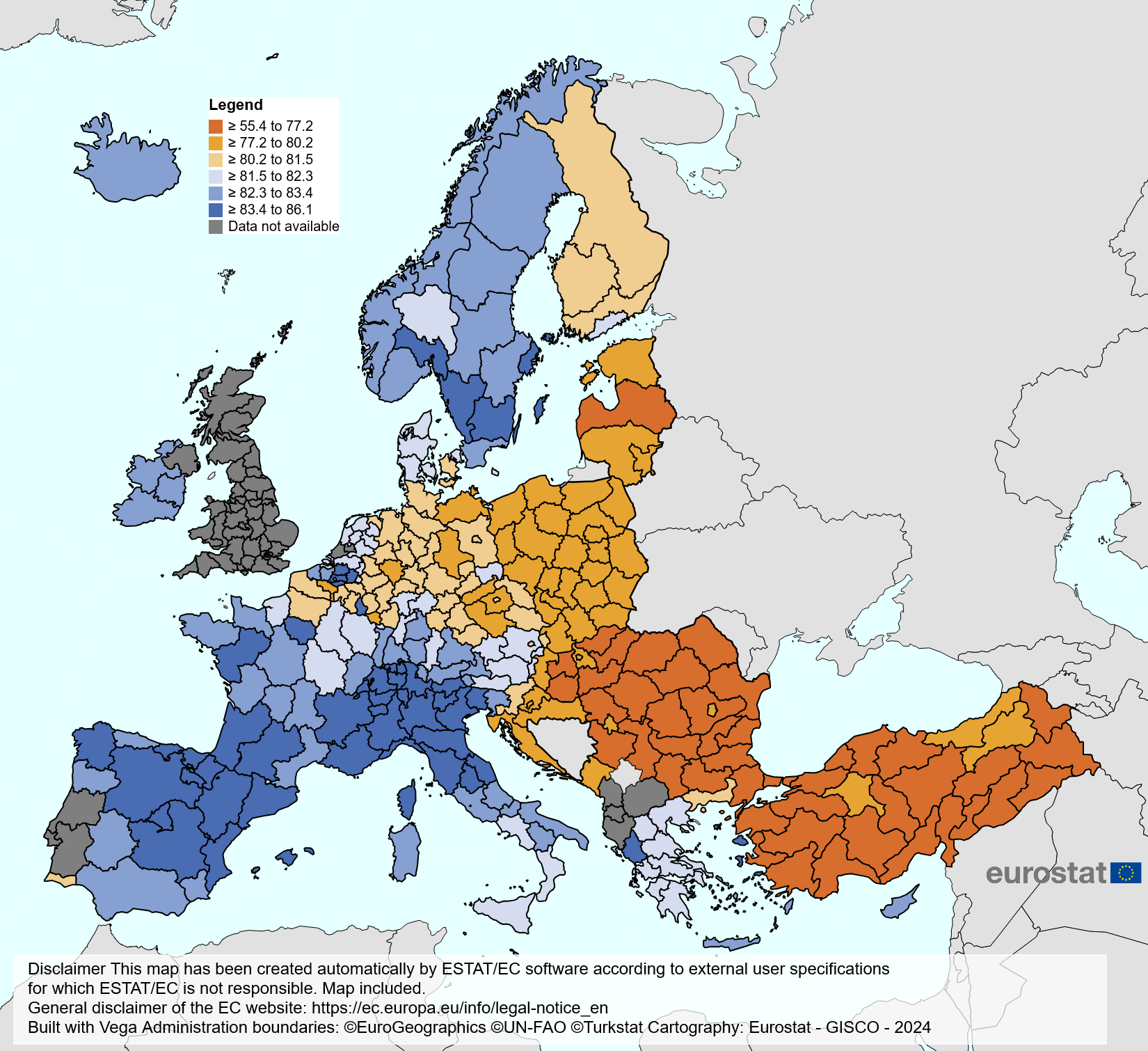
Life expectancy in Turkish regions in comparison with regions of other European countries in 2018, 2019 and 2023, according to Eurostat (legends on the maps are different)

== Global Data Lab (2019–2022) ==
region	2019				2019 →2021	2021	2021 →2022	2022				2019 →2022
region	overall	male	female	F Δ M	2019 →2021	overall	2021 →2022	overall	male	female	F Δ M	2019 →2022
Turkey on average	77.83	74.68	80.95	6.27	−1.80	76.03	2.45	78.48	75.38	81.50	6.12	0.65
East Black Sea Region	79.33	75.62	82.90	7.28	−1.84	77.49	2.49	79.98	76.33	83.45	7.12	0.65
West Anatolia Region	78.33	75.15	81.40	6.25	−1.81	76.52	2.46	78.98	75.85	81.95	6.10	0.65
Istanbul Region	78.25	75.04	81.32	6.28	−1.81	76.44	2.45	78.89	75.74	81.86	6.12	0.64
Central East Anatolia Region	77.88	74.93	80.83	5.90	−1.80	76.08	2.44	78.52	75.63	81.37	5.74	0.64
Mediterranean Region	77.77	74.88	80.69	5.81	−1.80	75.97	2.44	78.41	75.58	81.23	5.65	0.64
West Black Sea Region	77.77	74.60	81.06	6.46	−1.80	75.97	2.44	78.41	75.30	81.60	6.30	0.64
Central Anatolia Region	77.60	74.61	80.57	5.96	−1.80	75.80	2.44	78.24	75.31	81.11	5.80	0.64
Aegean Region	77.56	74.35	80.83	6.48	−1.79	75.77	2.43	78.20	75.04	81.37	6.33	0.64
Northeast Anatolia Region	77.50	74.54	80.63	6.09	−1.79	75.71	2.43	78.14	75.24	81.17	5.93	0.64
East Marmara Region	77.46	74.45	80.47	6.02	−1.79	75.67	2.43	78.10	75.15	81.01	5.86	0.64
Southeast Anatolia Region	77.44	74.10	80.64	6.54	−1.79	75.65	2.43	78.08	74.79	81.18	6.39	0.64
West Marmara Region	77.11	73.77	80.57	6.80	−1.78	75.33	2.42	77.75	74.46	81.11	6.65	0.64

Data source: Global Data Lab

== Charts ==
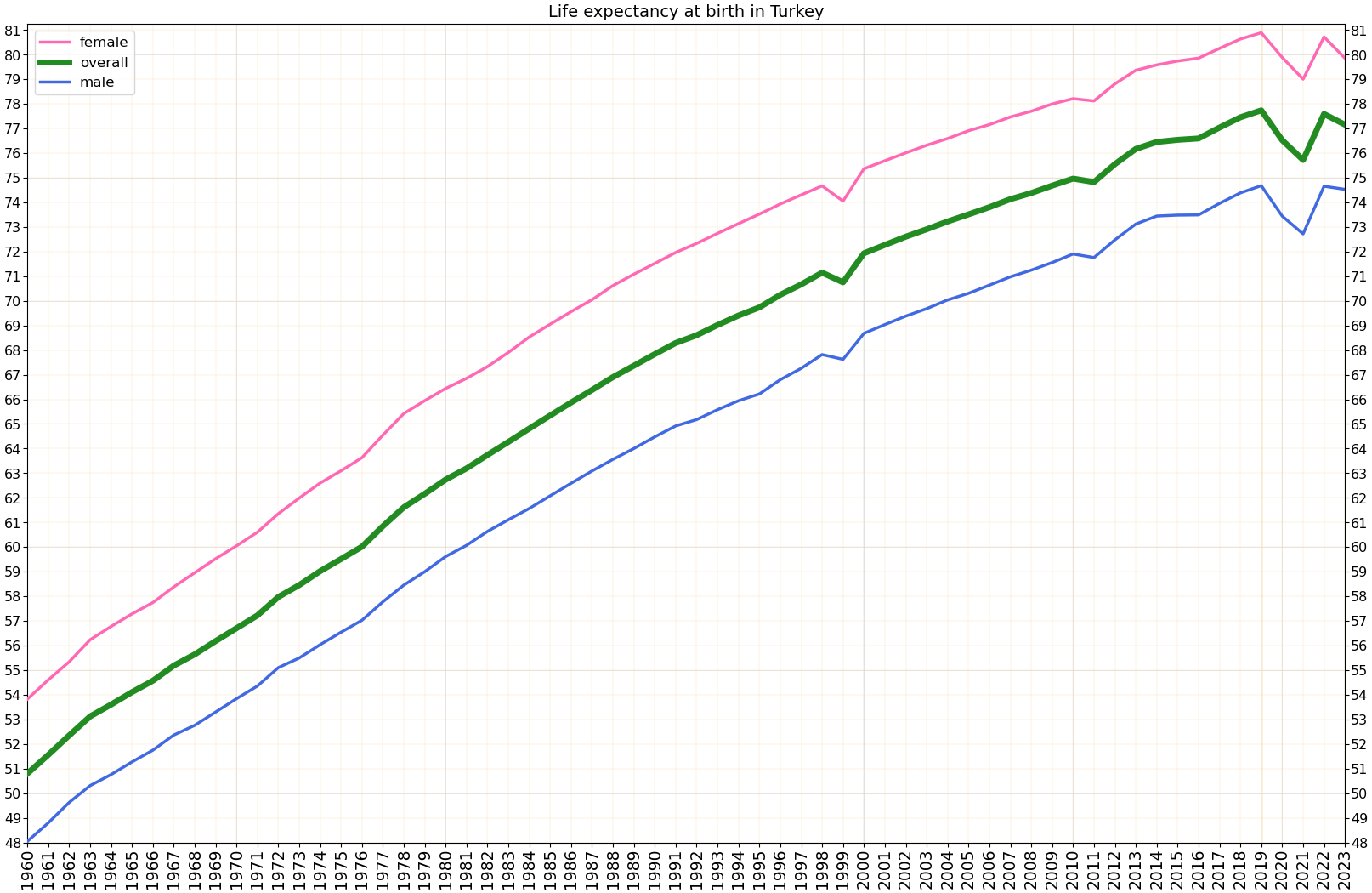
Development of life expectancy in Turkey according to estimation of the World Bank Group

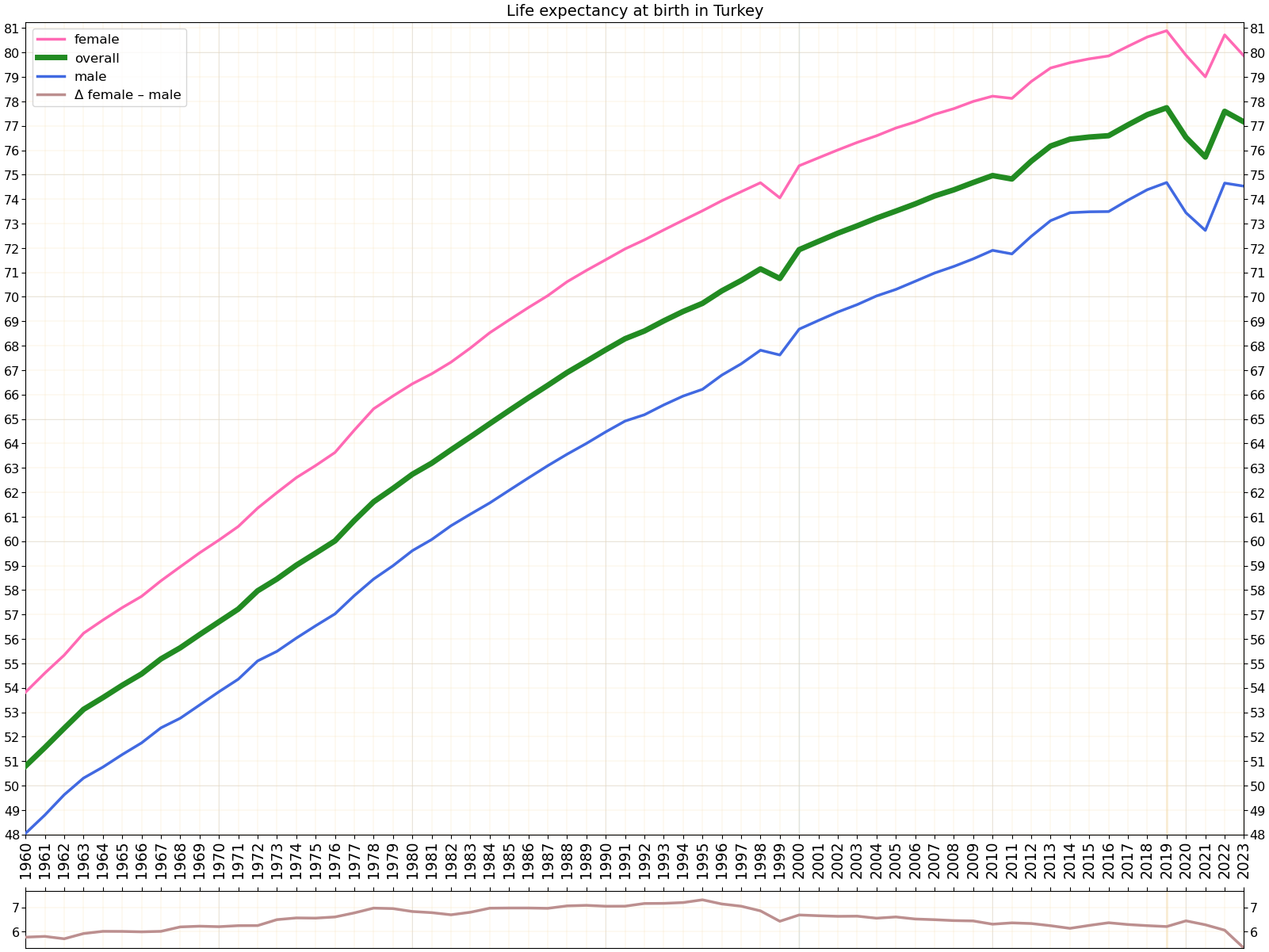
Life expectancy with calculated sex gap

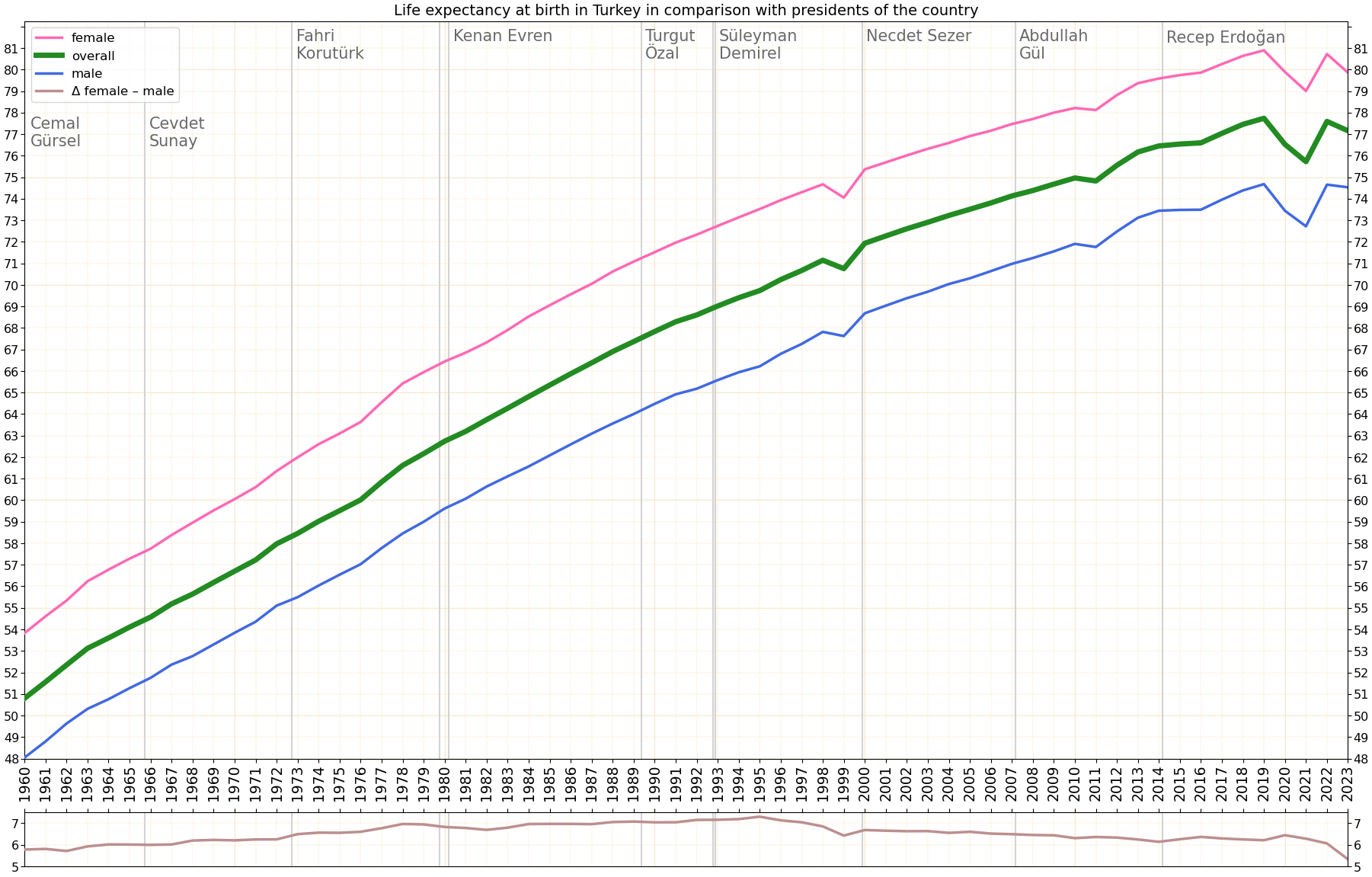
Life expectancy in comparison to presidents of the country

Life expectancy in Turkey according to estimation of Our World in Data

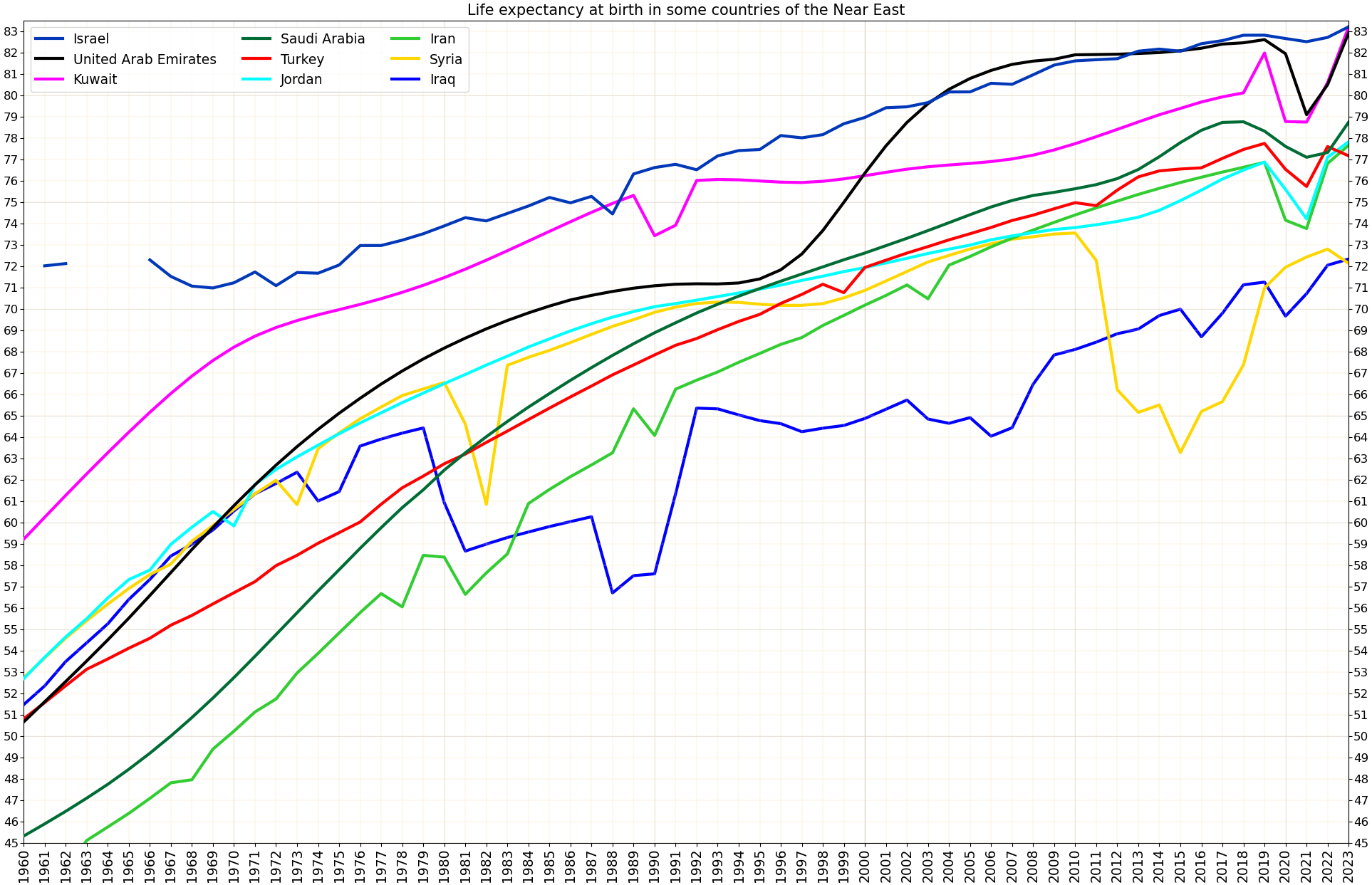
Development of life expectancy in Turkey in comparison to other countries of the Near East
Life expectancy and healthy life expectancy in Turkey on the background of other countries of the world in 2019

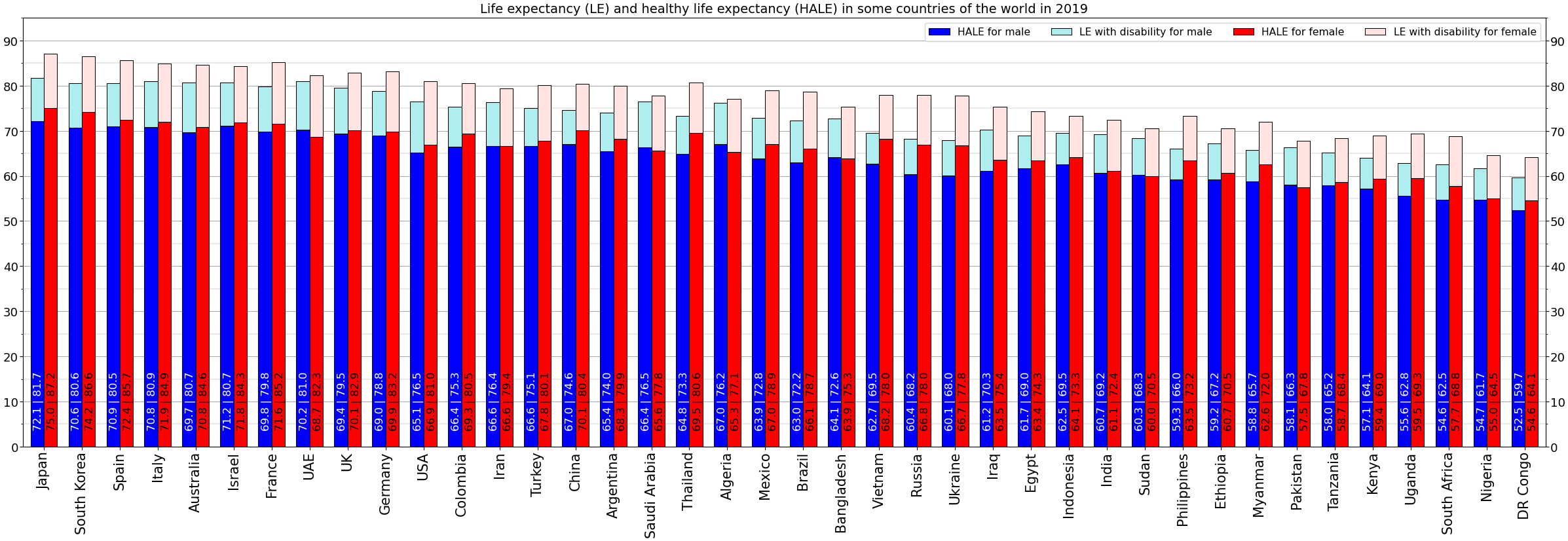
Life expectancy and healthy life expectancy for males and females separately
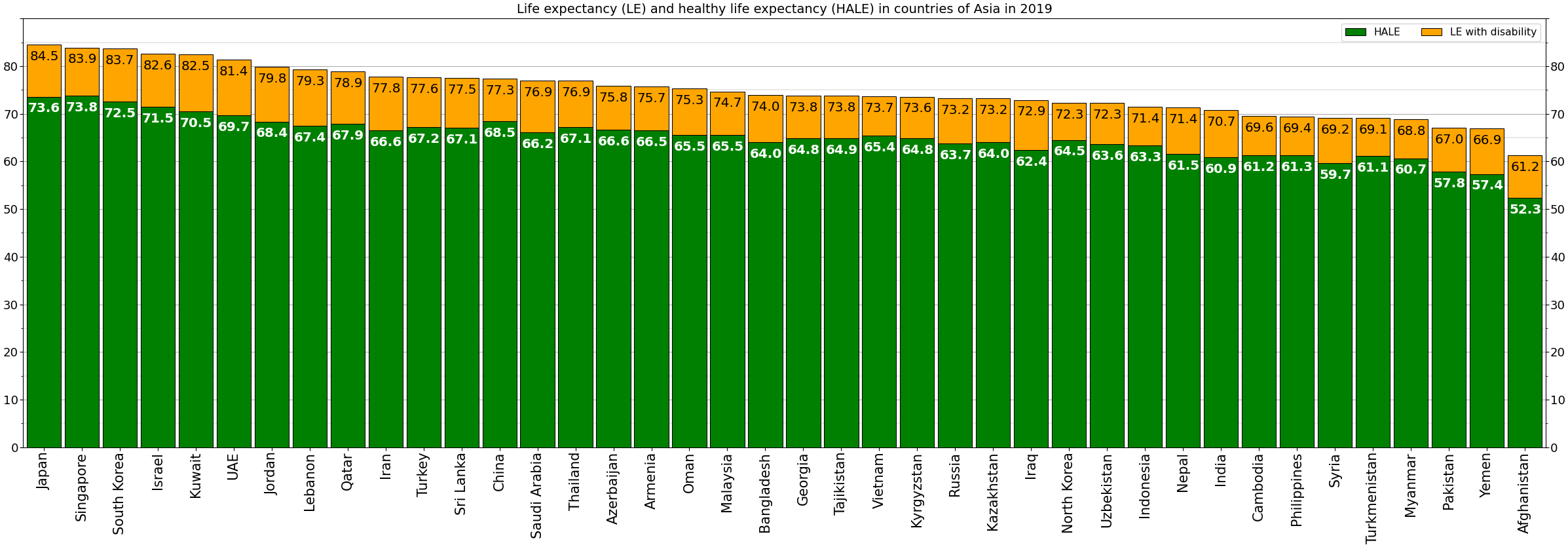
Life expectancy and healthy life expectancy in Turkey on the background of other countries of Asia in 2019

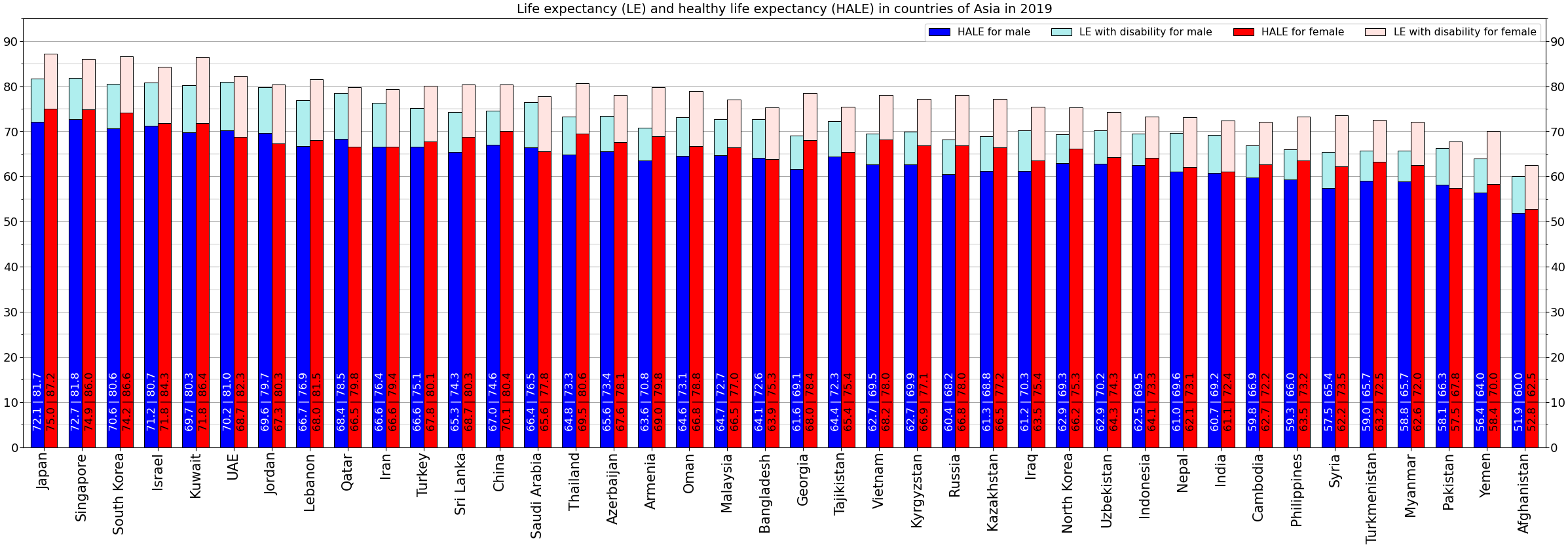
Life expectancy and healthy life expectancy for males and females separately
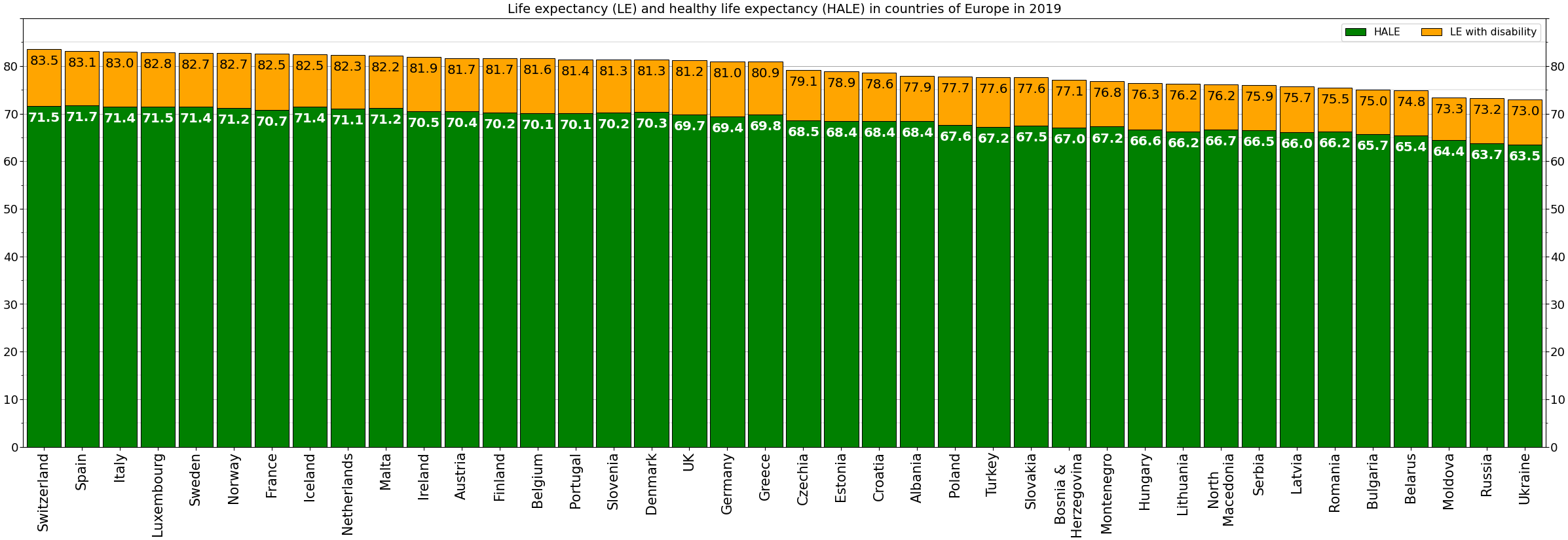
Life expectancy and healthy life expectancy in Turkey on the background of other countries of Europe in 2019

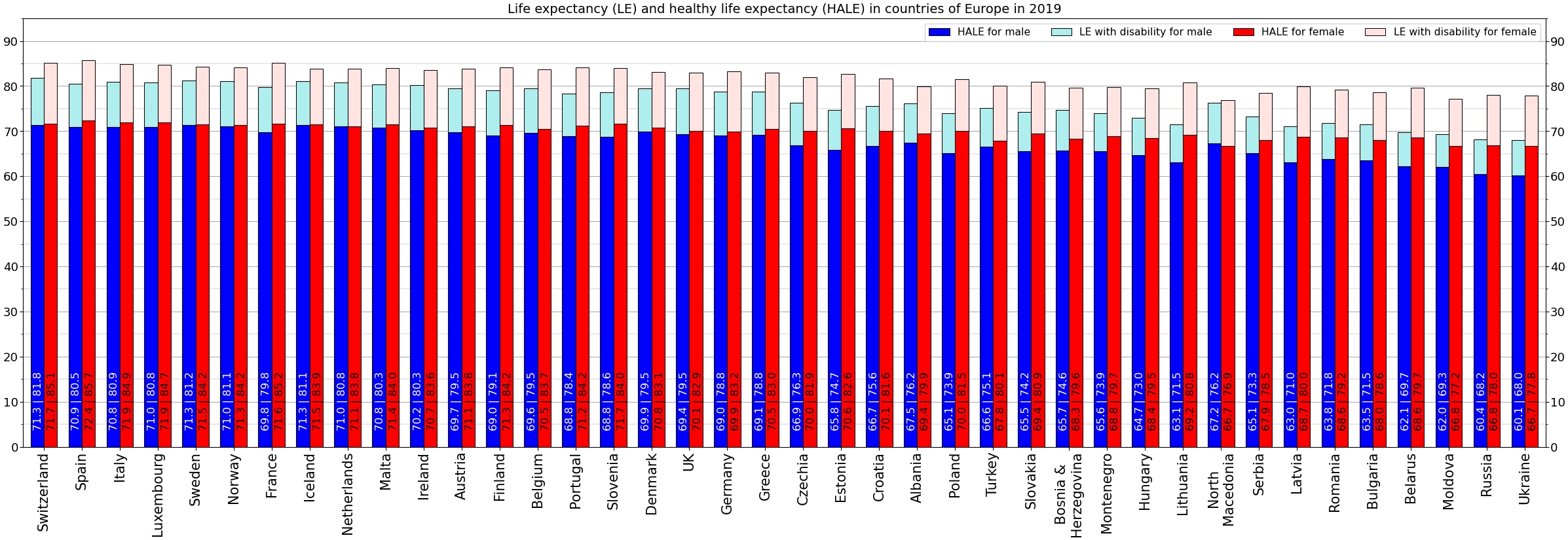
Life expectancy and healthy life expectancy for males and females separately

== See also ==
- List of countries by life expectancy
- List of Asian countries by life expectancy
- List of European countries by life expectancy
- Provinces of Turkey by population
- Demographics of Turkey
