= Erzurum Subregion =

Erzurum Subregion Erzurum Alt Bölgesi
- Subregion
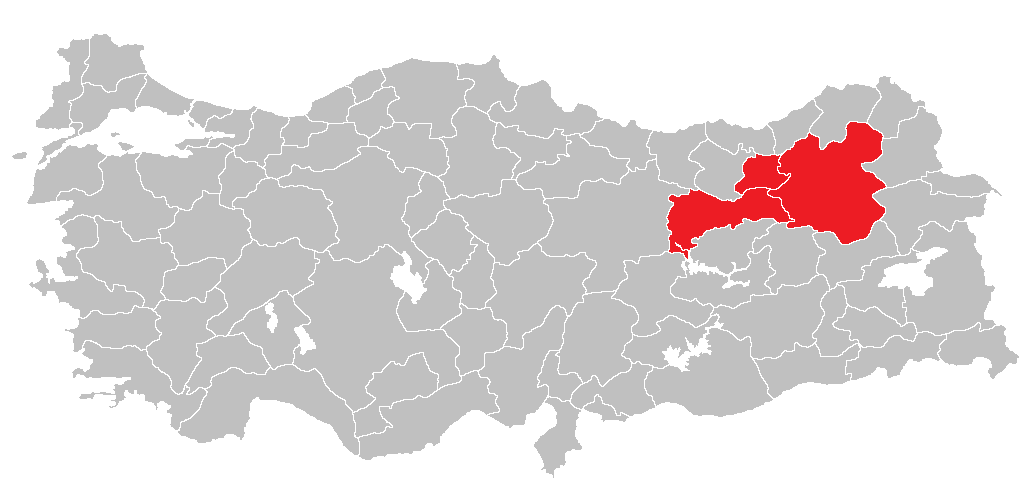
- Country: Turkey
- Region: Northeast Anatolia

Area
  - Subregion: 40,692 km^{2} (15,711 sq mi)

Population (2013)
  - Subregion: 1,062,345
  - Rank: 24th
  - Density: 26.107/km^{2} (67.617/sq mi)
  - Urban: 933,685
  - Rural: 128,660

The Erzurum Subregion (Turkish: Erzurum Alt Bölgesi) (TRA1) is a statistical subregion in Turkey.

== Provinces ==
- Erzurum Province (TRA11)
- Erzincan Province (TRA12)
- Bayburt Province (TRA13)

== See also ==
- NUTS of Turkey

== Sources ==
- ESPON Database
