= Kayseri Subregion =

Kayseri Subregion Kayseri Alt Bölgesi
- Subregion
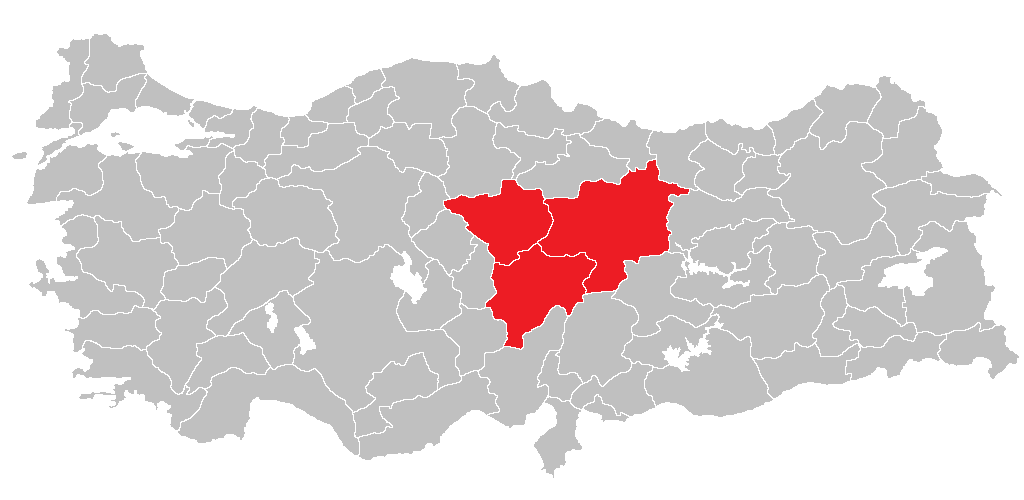
- Country: Turkey
- Region: Central Anatolia

Area
  - Subregion: 59,528 km^{2} (22,984 sq mi)

Population (2013)
  - Subregion: 2,363,390
  - Rank: 15th
  - Density: 39.702/km^{2} (102.83/sq mi)
  - Urban: 1,999,389
  - Rural: 364,001

The Kayseri Subregion (Turkish: Kayseri Alt Bölgesi) (TR72) is a statistical subregion in Turkey. It is also the largest subregion in Turkey by area.

== Provinces ==
- Kayseri Province (TR721)
- Sivas Province (TR722)
- Yozgat Province (TR723)

== See also ==
- NUTS of Turkey

== Sources ==
- ESPON Database
