= Zonguldak Subregion =

Zonguldak Subregion Zonguldak Alt Bölgesi
- Subregion
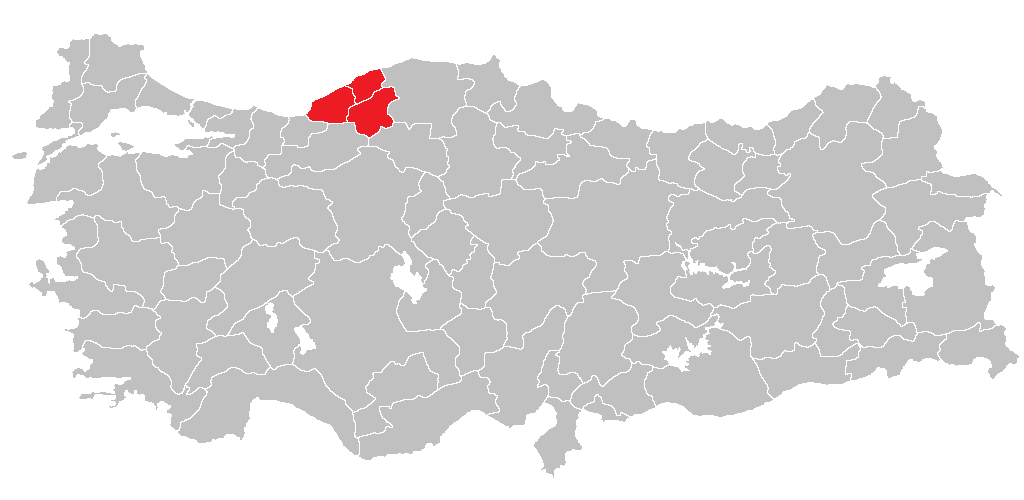
- Coordinates: 41.30825°N 32.0955°E
- Country: Turkey
- Region: West Black Sea

Area
  - Subregion: 9,710 km^{2} (3,750 sq mi)

Population (2013)
  - Subregion: 1,020,957
  - Rank: 25th
  - Density: 105/km^{2} (272/sq mi)
  - Urban: 601,522
  - Rural: 419,435

The Zonguldak Subregion (Turkish: Zonguldak Alt Bölgesi) (TR81) is a statistical subregion in Turkey.

== Provinces ==
- Zonguldak Province (TR811)
- Karabük Province (TR812)
- Bartın Province (TR813)

== See also ==
- NUTS of Turkey

== Sources ==
- ESPON Database
