= Antalya Subregion =

Antalya Subregion Antalya Alt Bölgesi
- Subregion
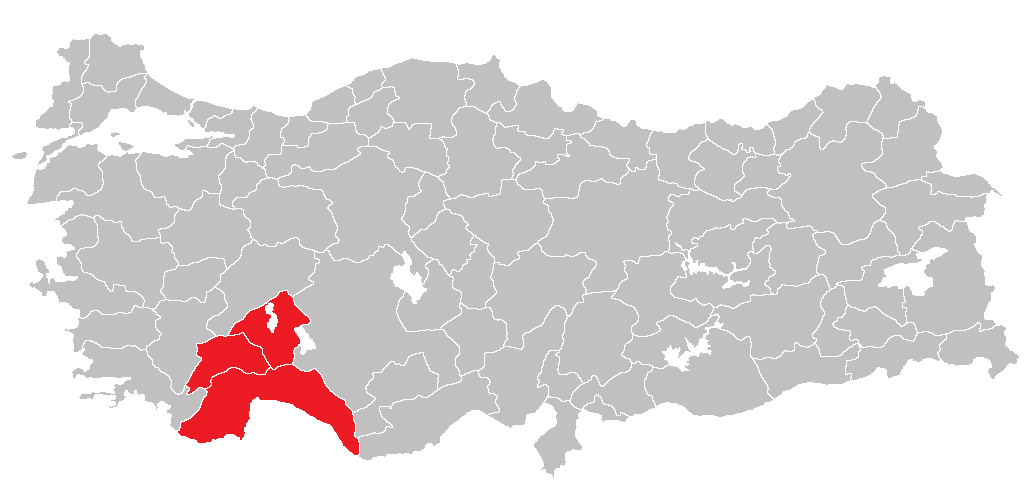
- Coordinates: 37.2447°N 30.6262°E
- Country: Turkey
- Region: Mediterranean

Area
  - Subregion: 36,603 km^{2} (14,132 sq mi)

Population (2013)
  - Subregion: 2,833,306
  - Rank: 11th
  - Density: 77.406/km^{2} (200.48/sq mi)
  - Urban: 2,613,438
  - Rural: 219,868

The Antalya Subregion (Turkish: Antalya Alt Bölgesi) (TR61) is a statistical subregion in Turkey.

== Provinces ==
- Antalya Province (TR611)
- Isparta Province (TR612)
- Burdur Province (TR613)

== See also ==
- NUTS of Turkey

== Sources ==
- ESPON Database
