= Kocaeli Subregion =

Kocaeli Subregion Kocaeli Alt Bölgesi
- Subregion
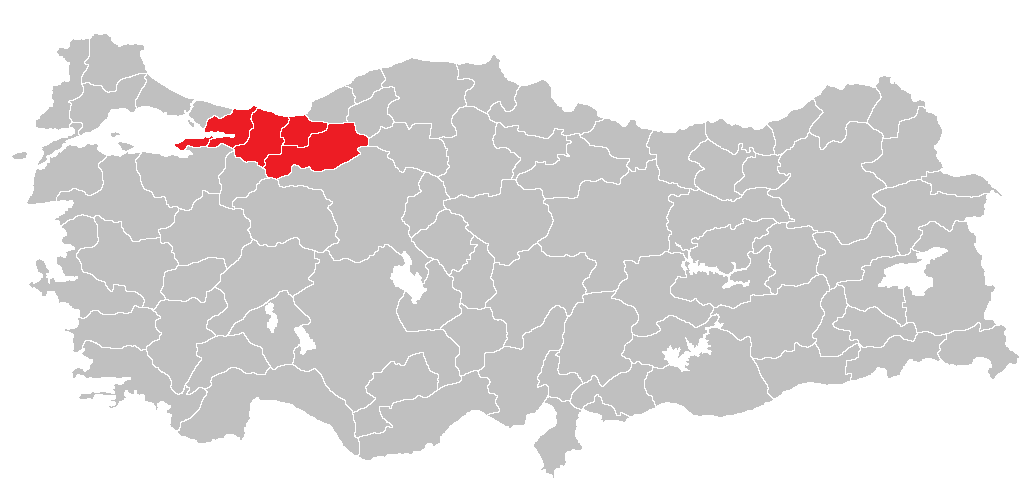
- Country: Turkey
- Region: East Marmara

Area
  - Subregion: 20,402 km^{2} (7,877 sq mi)

Population (2013)
  - Subregion: 3,448,702
  - Rank: 6th
  - Density: 169.04/km^{2} (437.80/sq mi)
  - Urban: 3,148,994
  - Rural: 299,708

The Kocaeli Subregion (Turkish: Kocaeli Alt Bölgesi) (TR42) is a statistical subregion in Turkey.

== Provinces ==
- Kocaeli Province (TR421)
- Sakarya Province (TR422)
- Düzce Province (TR423)
- Bolu Province (TR424)
- Yalova Province (TR425)

== See also ==
- NUTS of Turkey

== Sources ==
- ESPON Database
