= Samsun Subregion =

Samsun Subregion Samsun Alt Bölgesi
- Subregion
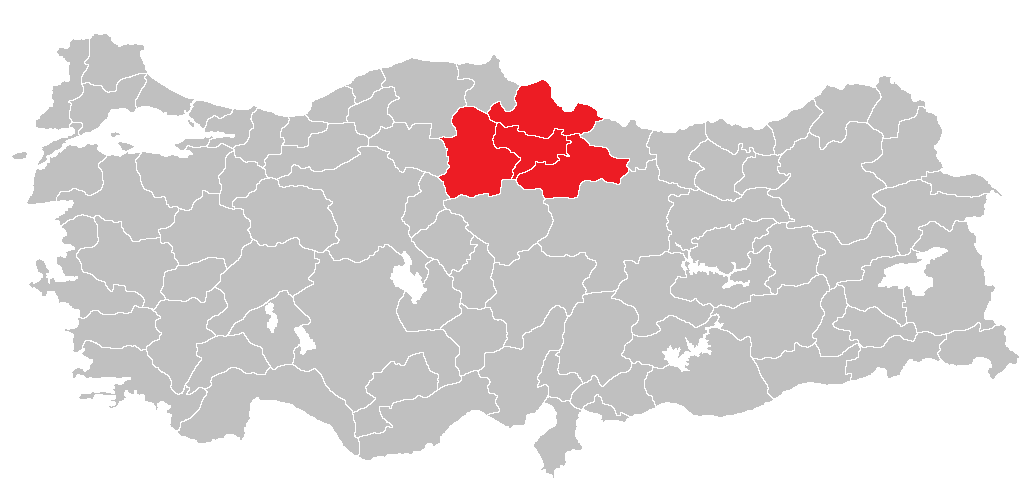
- Country: Turkey
- Region: West Black Sea

Area
  - Subregion: 37,878 km^{2} (14,625 sq mi)

Population (2013)
  - Subregion: 2,714,575
  - Rank: 12th
  - Density: 71.666/km^{2} (185.61/sq mi)
  - Urban: 2,205,125
  - Rural: 509,450

The Samsun Subregion (Turkish: Samsun Alt Bölgesi) (TR83) is a statistical subregion in Turkey.

== Provinces ==
- Samsun Province (TR831)
- Tokat Province (TR832)
- Çorum Province (TR833)
- Amasya Province (TR834)

== See also ==
- NUTS of Turkey

== Sources ==
- ESPON Database
