= West Black Sea region (statistical) =

West Black Sea Region Batı Karadeniz Bölgesi
- Region
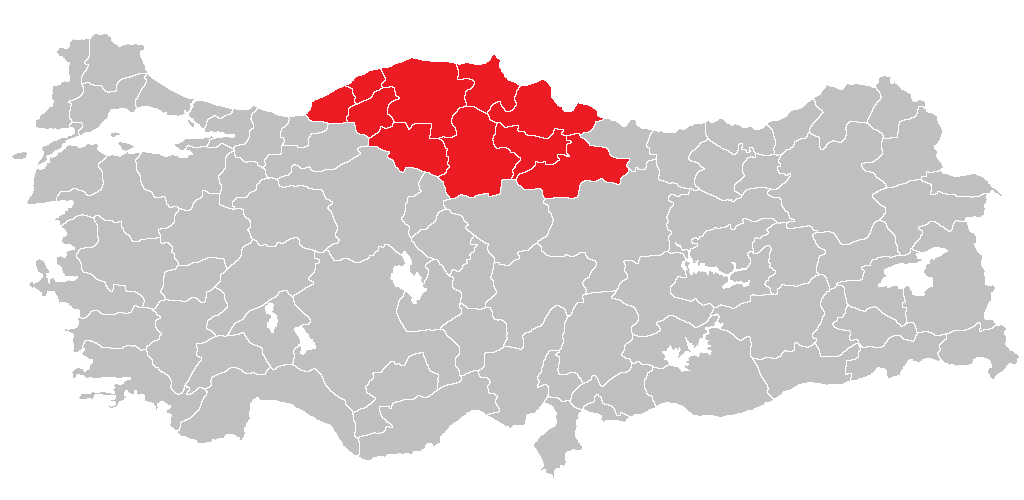
- Country: Turkey

Area
  - Region: 73,946 km^{2} (28,551 sq mi)

Population (2025)
  - Region: 4,716,187
  - Rank: 7th
  - Density: 63.779/km^{2} (165.19/sq mi)
  - Urban: 3,119,792
  - Rural: 1,596,395
- HDI (2023): 0.825 very high · 9th

The West Black Sea Region (Turkish: Batı Karadeniz Bölgesi) (TR8) is a statistical region in Turkey.

== Subregions and provinces ==
- Zonguldak Subregion (TR81)
  - Zonguldak Province (TR811)
  - Karabük Province (TR812)
  - Bartın Province (TR813)
- Kastamonu Subregion (TR82)
  - Kastamonu Province (TR821)
  - Çankırı Province (TR822)
  - Sinop Province (TR823)
- Samsun Subregion (TR83)
  - Samsun Province (TR831)
  - Tokat Province (TR832)
  - Çorum Province (TR833)
  - Amasya Province (TR834)

== Population ==
Historical population
Year	Pop.	±% p.a.
1927	1,832,532	—
1935	2,113,755	+1.80%
1940	2,214,333	+0.93%
1945	2,380,406	+1.46%
1950	2,651,114	+2.18%
1955	2,918,519	+1.94%
1960	3,289,723	+2.42%
1965	3,631,198	+1.99%
1970	3,904,706	+1.46%
1975	4,183,405	+1.39%
1980	4,485,875	+1.41%
1985	4,784,676	+1.30%
1990	4,886,158	+0.42%
1997	4,628,435	−0.77%
2000	4,895,744	+1.89%
2007	4,477,457	−1.27%
2008	4,478,029	+0.01%
2009	4,512,288	+0.77%
2010	4,518,786	+0.14%
2011	4,477,107	−0.92%
2012	4,483,603	+0.15%
2013	4,499,102	+0.35%
2014	4,493,559	−0.12%
2015	4,502,525	+0.20%
2016	4,551,366	+1.08%
2017	4,574,182	+0.50%
2018	4,688,532	+2.50%
2019	4,666,150	−0.48%
2020	4,638,622	−0.59%
2021	4,666,651	+0.60%
2022	4,665,938	−0.02%
2023	4,730,539	+1.38%
2024	4,711,687	−0.40%
2025	4,716,187	+0.10%

=== Structure of the population ===
Structure of the population

Structure of the population (31.12.2024):

Age group	Male	Female	Total	Percent
Total	2,341,992	2,369,695	4,711,687	100
0–4	108,858	103,141	211,999	4.50
5–9	140,893	133,462	274,355	5.82
10–14	151,684	143,150	294,834	6.26
15–19	161,703	155,062	316,765	6.72
20–24	166,199	164,056	330,255	7.00
25–29	161,280	147,762	309,042	6.56
30–34	150,257	144,469	294,726	6.26
35–39	159,187	153,945	313,132	6.65
40–44	171,736	168,238	339,974	7.22
45–49	164,707	161,085	325,792	6.91
50–54	158,894	163,828	322,722	6.85
55–59	151,902	152,936	304,838	6.47
60–64	153,104	162,780	315,884	6.70
65–69	129,106	136,621	265,727	5.64
70–74	95,706	108,753	204,459	4.34
75–79	63,111	82,506	145,617	3.09
80–84	33,293	49,655	82,948	1.76
85–89	13,794	24,271	38,065	0.81
90+	6,578	13,975	20,553	0.44

Age group	Male	Female	Total	Percent
0–14	401,435	379,153	781,188	16.58
15–64	1,598,969	1,574,161	3,173,130	67.34
65+	341,588	415,781	757,369	16.08

Structure of the population (31.12.2025):

Age group	Male	Female	Total	Percent
Total	2,345,289	2,370,898	4,716,187	100
0–4	103,483	98,109	201,592	4.27
5–9	136,070	129,109	265,179	5.62
10–14	151,330	142,931	294,261	6.24
15–19	161,060	154,792	315,852	6.70
20–24	164,755	160,054	324,809	6.89
25–29	162,448	148,980	311,428	6.60
30–34	150,226	143,801	294,027	6.23
35–39	157,002	151,302	308,304	6.54
40–44	169,284	164,715	333,999	7.08
45–49	171,289	167,917	339,206	7.19
50–54	158,529	162,386	320,915	6.80
55–59	144,506	144,266	288,772	6.12
60–64	157,662	167,520	325,182	6.90
65–69	128,860	136,336	265,196	5.62
70–74	103,271	118,297	221,568	4.70
75–79	67,972	88,256	156,228	3.31
80–84	36,186	51,910	88,096	1.87
85–89	15,173	26,568	41,741	0.89
90+	6,183	13,649	19,832	0.42

Age group	Male	Female	Total	Percent
0–14	390,883	370,149	761,032	16.14
15–64	1,596,761	1,565,733	3,162,494	67.05
65+	357,645	435,016	792,661	16.81

== Internal immigration ==
Between December 31, 2024 and December 31, 2025
Region	Population	Immigrants	Emigrants	Net immigrants	Net immigration rate
West Black Sea	4,716,187	150,812	148,921	1,891	0.4

=== State register location of West Black Sea residents ===
As of December 31, 2025
Region	Population	Percentage
Istanbul	17.106	0.4
West Marmara	11,125	0.2
Aegean	25,214	0.5
East Marmara	37,503	0.8
West Anatolia	35,984	0.8
Mediterranean	49,469	1.0
Central Anatolia	91,791	1.9
West Black Sea	4,033,262	85.6
East Black Sea	225,449	4.8
Northeast Anatolia	50,198	1.1
Central East Anatolia	37,065	0.8
Southeast Anatolia	43,921	0.9
Foreign National	58,100	1.2
Total	4,716,187	100

== Marital status of 15+ population by gender ==
As of December 31, 2025
Gender	Never married	%	Married	%	Divorced	%	Spouse died	%	Total
Male	557,989	28.6	1,253,178	64.1	90,182	4.6	53,057	2.7	1,954,406
Female	426,777	21.3	1,227,006	61.3	90,944	4.5	256,022	12.8	2,000,749
Total	984,766	24.9	2,480,184	62.7	181,126	4.6	309,079	7.8	3,955,155

== Education status of 15+ population by gender ==
As of December 31, 2025
Gender	Illiterate	%	Literate with no diploma	%	Primary school	%	Primary education	%	Middle school	%	High school	%	College or university	%	Master's degree	%	Doctorate	%	Unknown	%	Total
Male	13,586	0.7	36,047	1.9	348,558	18.1	189,654	9.8	347,898	18.1	587,266	30.5	346,389	18.0	39,344	2.0	8,037	0.4	9,729	0.5	1,926,508
Female	88,231	4.5	131,409	6.6	521,319	26.4	150,461	7.6	278,628	14.1	438,483	22.2	319,311	16.1	33,914	1.7	5,466	0.3	10,728	0.5	1,977,950
All genders	101,817	2.6	167,456	4.3	869,877	22.3	340,115	8.7	626,526	16.0	1,025,749	26.3	665,700	17.0	73,258	1.9	13,503	0.3	20,457	0.5	3,904,458

== See also ==
- NUTS of Turkey

== Sources ==
- ESPON Database
