= Kastamonu Subregion =

Kastamonu Subregion Kastamonu Alt Bölgesi
- Subregion
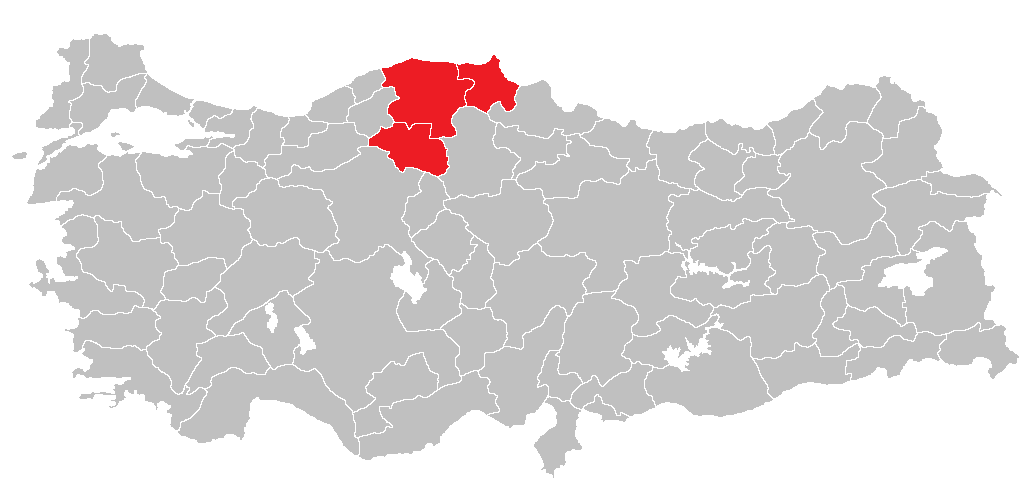
- Country: Turkey
- Region: West Black Sea

Area
  - Subregion: 26,358 km^{2} (10,177 sq mi)

Population (2013)
  - Subregion: 763,570
  - Rank: 26th
  - Density: 28.969/km^{2} (75.030/sq mi)
  - Urban: 436,385
  - Rural: 327,185

The Kastamonu Subregion (Turkish: Kastamonu Alt Bölgesi) (TR82) is a statistical subregion in Turkey.

== Provinces ==
- Kastamonu Province (TR821)
- Çankırı Province (TR822)
- Sinop Province (TR823)

== See also ==
- NUTS of Turkey

== Sources ==
- ESPON Database
