= Bursa Subregion =

Bursa Subregion Bursa Alt Bölgesi
- Subregion
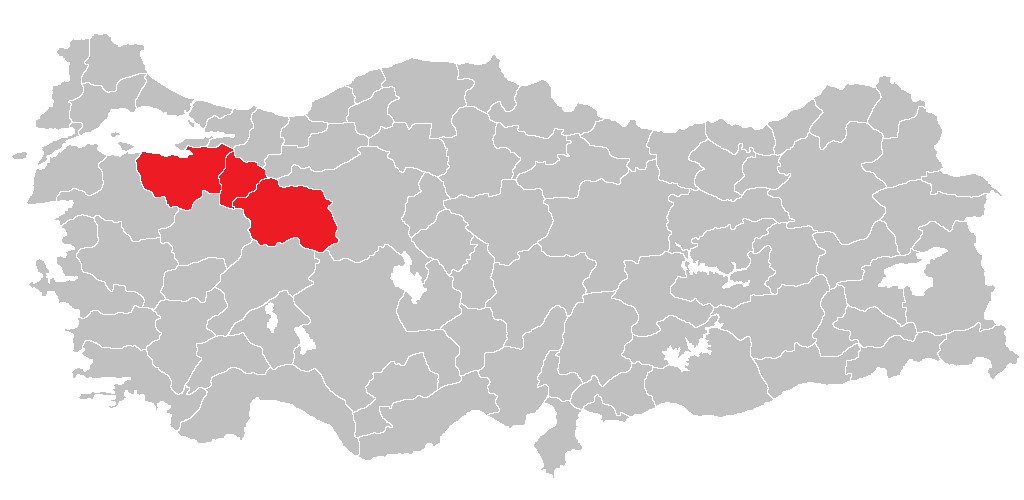
- Coordinates: 40.04°N 30.11°E
- Country: Turkey
- Region: East Marmara

Area
  - Subregion: 29,002 km^{2} (11,198 sq mi)

Population (2013)
  - Subregion: 3,749,582
  - Rank: 5th
  - Density: 129.29/km^{2} (334.85/sq mi)
  - Urban: 3,701,492
  - Rural: 48,090

The Bursa Subregion (Turkish: Bursa Alt Bölgesi) (TR41) is a statistical subregion in Turkey.

== Provinces ==
- Bursa Province (TR411)
- Eskişehir Province (TR412)
- Bilecik Province (TR413)

== See also ==
- NUTS of Turkey

== Sources ==
- ESPON Database
