= Adana Subregion =

Adana Subregion Adana Alt Bölgesi
- Subregion
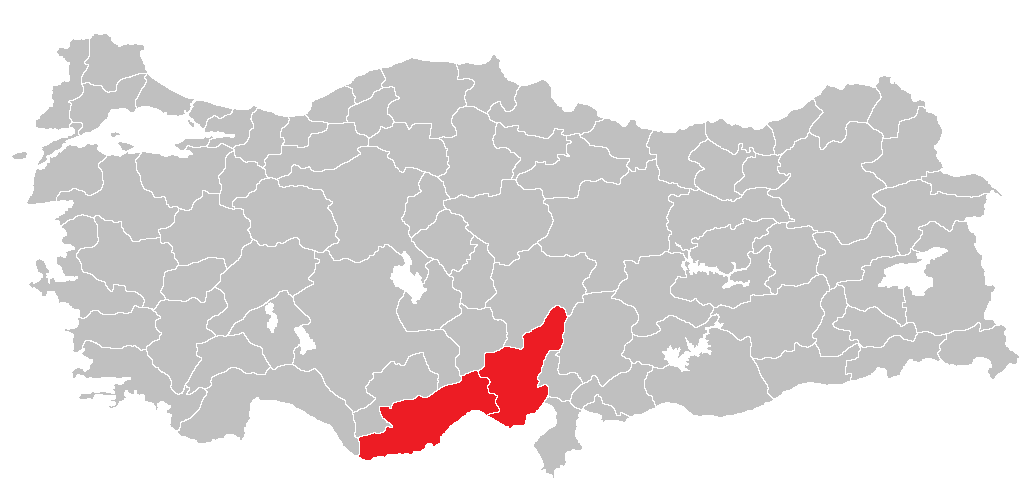
- Coordinates: 36.87°N 34.58°E
- Country: Turkey
- Region: Mediterranean

Area
  - Subregion: 29,883 km^{2} (11,538 sq mi)

Population (2013)
  - Subregion: 3,855,034
  - Rank: 4th
  - Density: 129.00/km^{2} (334.12/sq mi)
  - Urban: 3,855,034
  - Rural: 0

The Adana Subregion (Turkish: Adana Alt Bölgesi) (TR62) is a statistical subregion in southern Turkey.

== Provinces ==
- Adana Province (TR621)
- Mersin Province (TR622)

== See also ==
- NUTS of Turkey

== Sources ==
- ESPON Database
