= Konya Subregion =

Konya Subregion Konya Alt Bölgesi
- Subregion
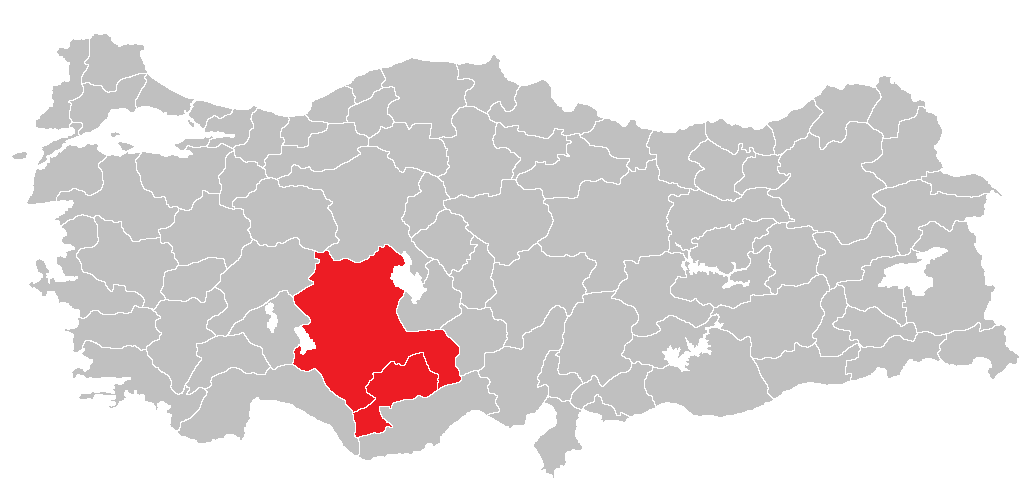
- Country: Turkey
- Region: West Anatolia

Area
  - Subregion: 47,420 km^{2} (18,310 sq mi)

Population (2013)
  - Subregion: 2,317,164
  - Rank: 16th
  - Density: 48.86/km^{2} (126.6/sq mi)
  - Urban: 2,247,911
  - Rural: 69,253

The Konya Subregion (Turkish: Konya Alt Bölgesi) (TR52) is a statistical subregion in Turkey.

== Provinces ==
- Konya Province (TR521)
- Karaman Province (TR522)

== See also ==
- NUTS of Turkey

== Sources ==
- ESPON Database
