= Malatya Subregion =

Malatya Subregion Malatya Alt Bölgesi
- Subregion
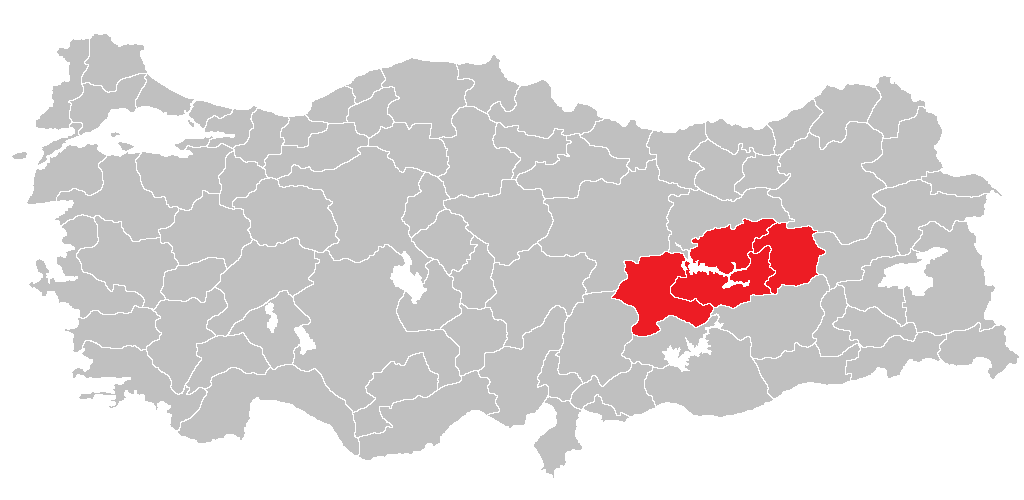
- Country: Turkey
- Region: Central East Anatolia

Area
  - Subregion: 37,365 km^{2} (14,427 sq mi)

Population (2013)
  - Subregion: 1,681,719
  - Rank: 19th
  - Density: 45.008/km^{2} (116.57/sq mi)
  - Urban: 1,372,613
  - Rural: 309,106

The Malatya Subregion (Turkish: Malatya Alt Bölgesi) (TRB1) is a statistical subregion in Turkey.

== Provinces ==
- Malatya Province (TRB11)
- Elazığ Province (TRB12)
- Bingöl Province (TRB13)
- Tunceli Province (TRB14)

== See also ==
- NUTS of Turkey

== Sources ==
- ESPON Database
