= Balıkesir Subregion =

Balıkesir Subregion Balıkesir Alt Bölgesi
- Subregion
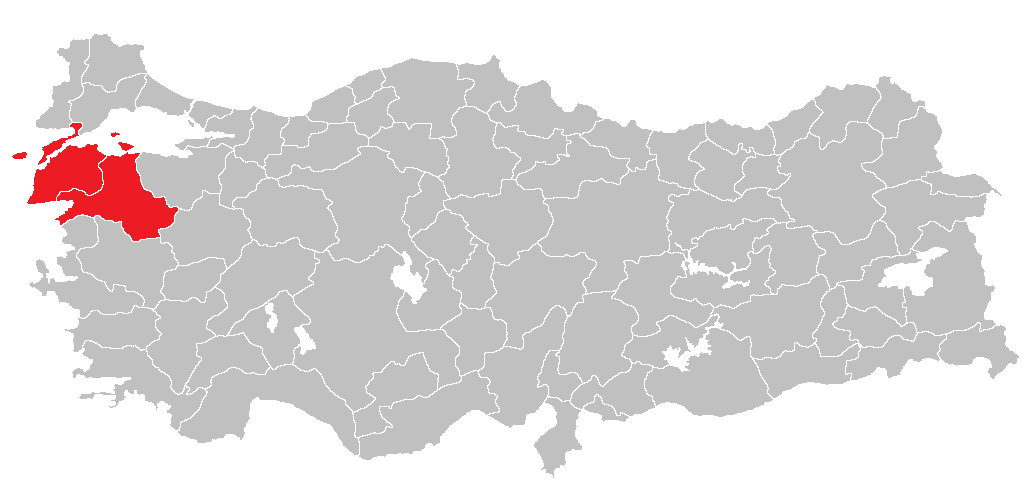
- Coordinates: 39.74°N 27.69°E
- Country: Turkey
- Region: West Marmara

Area
  - Subregion: 22,233 km^{2} (8,584 sq mi)

Population (2013)
  - Subregion: 1,665,089
  - Rank: 20th
  - Density: 74.893/km^{2} (193.97/sq mi)
  - Urban: 1,451,531
  - Rural: 213,558

The Balıkesir Subregion (Turkish: Balıkesir Alt Bölgesi) (TR22) is a statistical subregion in Turkey.

== Provinces ==
- Balıkesir Province (TR221)
- Çanakkale Province (TR222)

== See also ==
- NUTS of Turkey

== Sources ==
- ESPON Database
