= NUTS statistical regions of Turkey =

Administrative divisions in Turkey

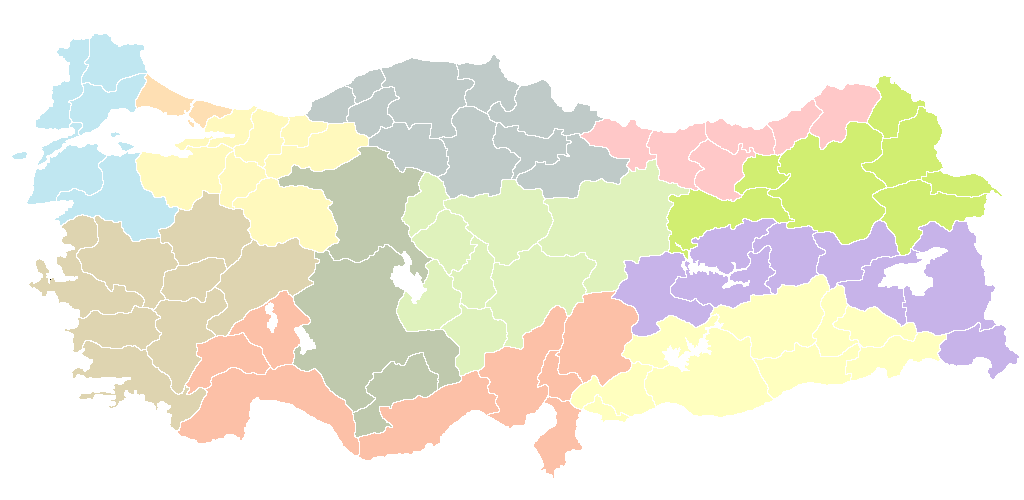
NUTS of Turkey on first level

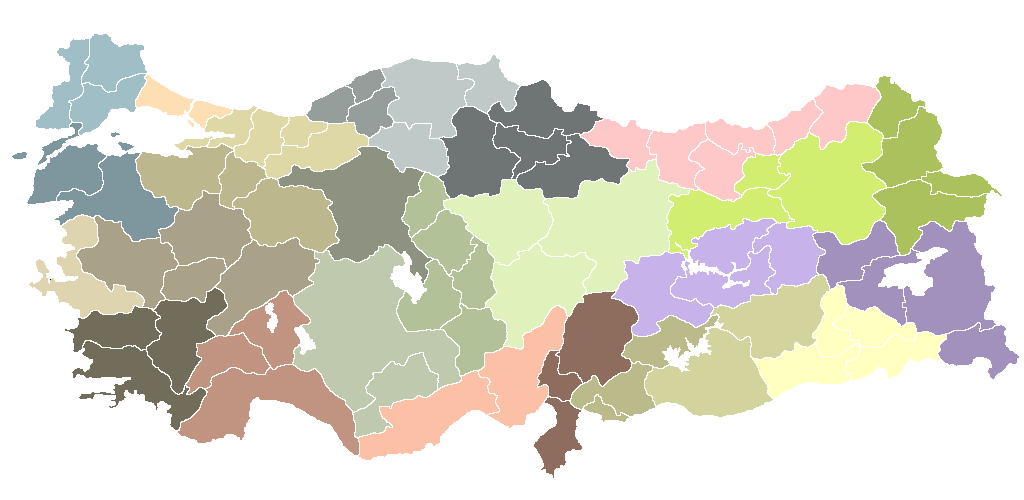
NUTS of Turkey on second level

As a candidate country of the European Union, Turkey (TR) is included in the Nomenclature of Territorial Units for Statistics (NUTS). Defined in 2002 in agreement between Eurostat and the Turkish authorities, Turkey's NUTS classifications are officially termed statistical regions, as Turkey is not a member of the EU and Eurostat only defines NUTS for member states. The three NUTS levels are:

- NUTS-1: 12 Regions
- NUTS-2: 26 Subregions
- NUTS-3: 81 Provinces

Below the NUTS levels, there are two LAU levels:

- LAU-1: 923 districts
- LAU-2: 37,675 municipalities

The NUTS codes are as follows:

NUTS-1	NUTS-2	NUTS-3
Istanbul Region (TR1)	Istanbul Subregion (TR10)	Istanbul Province (TR100)
West Marmara Region (TR2)	Tekirdağ Subregion (TR21)	Tekirdağ Province (TR211)
West Marmara Region (TR2)	Tekirdağ Subregion (TR21)	Edirne Province (TR212)
West Marmara Region (TR2)	Tekirdağ Subregion (TR21)	Kırklareli Province (TR213)
West Marmara Region (TR2)	Balıkesir Subregion (TR22)	Balıkesir Province (TR221)
West Marmara Region (TR2)	Balıkesir Subregion (TR22)	Çanakkale Province (TR222)
Aegean Region (TR3)	Izmir Subregion (TR31)	İzmir Province (TR310)
Aegean Region (TR3)	Aydın Subregion (TR32)	Aydın Province (TR321)
Aegean Region (TR3)	Aydın Subregion (TR32)	Denizli Province (TR322)
Aegean Region (TR3)	Aydın Subregion (TR32)	Muğla Province (TR323)
Aegean Region (TR3)	Manisa Subregion (TR33)	Manisa Province (TR331)
Aegean Region (TR3)	Manisa Subregion (TR33)	Afyonkarahisar Province (TR332)
Aegean Region (TR3)	Manisa Subregion (TR33)	Kütahya Province (TR333)
Aegean Region (TR3)	Manisa Subregion (TR33)	Uşak Province (TR334)
East Marmara Region (TR4)	Bursa Subregion (TR41)	Bursa Province (TR411)
East Marmara Region (TR4)	Bursa Subregion (TR41)	Eskişehir Province (TR412)
East Marmara Region (TR4)	Bursa Subregion (TR41)	Bilecik Province (TR413)
East Marmara Region (TR4)	Kocaeli Subregion (TR42)	Kocaeli Province (TR421)
East Marmara Region (TR4)	Kocaeli Subregion (TR42)	Sakarya Province (TR422)
East Marmara Region (TR4)	Kocaeli Subregion (TR42)	Düzce Province (TR423)
East Marmara Region (TR4)	Kocaeli Subregion (TR42)	Bolu Province (TR424)
East Marmara Region (TR4)	Kocaeli Subregion (TR42)	Yalova Province (TR425)
West Anatolia Region (TR5)	Ankara Subregion (TR51)	Ankara Province (TR510)
West Anatolia Region (TR5)	Konya Subregion (TR52)	Konya Province (TR521)
West Anatolia Region (TR5)	Konya Subregion (TR52)	Karaman Province (TR522)
Mediterranean Region (TR6)	Antalya Subregion (TR61)	Antalya Province (TR611)
Mediterranean Region (TR6)	Antalya Subregion (TR61)	Isparta Province (TR612)
Mediterranean Region (TR6)	Antalya Subregion (TR61)	Burdur Province (TR613)
Mediterranean Region (TR6)	Adana Subregion (TR62)	Adana Province (TR621)
Mediterranean Region (TR6)	Adana Subregion (TR62)	Mersin Province (TR622)
Mediterranean Region (TR6)	Hatay Subregion (TR63)	Hatay Province (TR631)
Mediterranean Region (TR6)	Hatay Subregion (TR63)	Kahramanmaraş Province (TR632)
Mediterranean Region (TR6)	Hatay Subregion (TR63)	Osmaniye Province (TR633)
Central Anatolia Region (TR7)	Kırıkkale Subregion (TR71)	Kırıkkale Province (TR711)
Central Anatolia Region (TR7)	Kırıkkale Subregion (TR71)	Aksaray Province (TR712)
Central Anatolia Region (TR7)	Kırıkkale Subregion (TR71)	Niğde Province (TR713)
Central Anatolia Region (TR7)	Kırıkkale Subregion (TR71)	Nevşehir Province (TR714)
Central Anatolia Region (TR7)	Kırıkkale Subregion (TR71)	Kırşehir Province (TR715)
Central Anatolia Region (TR7)	Kayseri Subregion (TR72)	Kayseri Province (TR721)
Central Anatolia Region (TR7)	Kayseri Subregion (TR72)	Sivas Province (TR722)
Central Anatolia Region (TR7)	Kayseri Subregion (TR72)	Yozgat Province (TR723)
West Black Sea Region (TR8)	Zonguldak Subregion (TR81)	Zonguldak Province (TR811)
West Black Sea Region (TR8)	Zonguldak Subregion (TR81)	Karabük Province (TR812)
West Black Sea Region (TR8)	Zonguldak Subregion (TR81)	Bartın Province (TR813)
West Black Sea Region (TR8)	Kastamonu Subregion (TR82)	Kastamonu Province (TR821)
West Black Sea Region (TR8)	Kastamonu Subregion (TR82)	Çankırı Province (TR822)
West Black Sea Region (TR8)	Kastamonu Subregion (TR82)	Sinop Province (TR823)
West Black Sea Region (TR8)	Samsun Subregion (TR83)	Samsun Province (TR831)
West Black Sea Region (TR8)	Samsun Subregion (TR83)	Tokat Province (TR832)
West Black Sea Region (TR8)	Samsun Subregion (TR83)	Çorum Province (TR833)
West Black Sea Region (TR8)	Samsun Subregion (TR83)	Amasya Province (TR834)
East Black Sea Region (TR9)	Trabzon Subregion (TR90)	Trabzon Province (TR901)
East Black Sea Region (TR9)	Trabzon Subregion (TR90)	Ordu Province (TR902)
East Black Sea Region (TR9)	Trabzon Subregion (TR90)	Giresun Province (TR903)
East Black Sea Region (TR9)	Trabzon Subregion (TR90)	Rize Province (TR904)
East Black Sea Region (TR9)	Trabzon Subregion (TR90)	Artvin Province (TR905)
East Black Sea Region (TR9)	Trabzon Subregion (TR90)	Gümüşhane Province (TR906)
Northeast Anatolia Region (TRA)	Erzurum Subregion (TRA1)	Erzurum Province (TRA11)
Northeast Anatolia Region (TRA)	Erzurum Subregion (TRA1)	Erzincan Province (TRA12)
Northeast Anatolia Region (TRA)	Erzurum Subregion (TRA1)	Bayburt Province (TRA13)
Northeast Anatolia Region (TRA)	Ağrı Subregion (TRA2)	Ağrı Province (TRA21)
Northeast Anatolia Region (TRA)	Ağrı Subregion (TRA2)	Kars Province (TRA22)
Northeast Anatolia Region (TRA)	Ağrı Subregion (TRA2)	Iğdır Province (TRA23)
Northeast Anatolia Region (TRA)	Ağrı Subregion (TRA2)	Ardahan Province (TRA24)
Central East Anatolia Region (TRB)	Malatya Subregion (TRB1)	Malatya Province (TRB11)
Central East Anatolia Region (TRB)	Malatya Subregion (TRB1)	Elazığ Province (TRB12)
Central East Anatolia Region (TRB)	Malatya Subregion (TRB1)	Bingöl Province (TRB13)
Central East Anatolia Region (TRB)	Malatya Subregion (TRB1)	Tunceli Province (TRB14)
Central East Anatolia Region (TRB)	Van Subregion (TRB2)	Van Province (TRB21)
Central East Anatolia Region (TRB)	Van Subregion (TRB2)	Muş Province (TRB22)
Central East Anatolia Region (TRB)	Van Subregion (TRB2)	Bitlis Province (TRB23)
Central East Anatolia Region (TRB)	Van Subregion (TRB2)	Hakkâri Province (TRB24)
Southeast Anatolia Region (TRC)	Gaziantep Subregion (TRC1)	Gaziantep Province (TRC11)
Southeast Anatolia Region (TRC)	Gaziantep Subregion (TRC1)	Adıyaman Province (TRC12)
Southeast Anatolia Region (TRC)	Gaziantep Subregion (TRC1)	Kilis Province (TRC13)
Southeast Anatolia Region (TRC)	Şanlıurfa Subregion (TRC2)	Şanlıurfa Province (TRC21)
Southeast Anatolia Region (TRC)	Şanlıurfa Subregion (TRC2)	Diyarbakır Province (TRC22)
Southeast Anatolia Region (TRC)	Mardin Subregion (TRC3)	Mardin Province (TRC31)
Southeast Anatolia Region (TRC)	Mardin Subregion (TRC3)	Batman Province (TRC32)
Southeast Anatolia Region (TRC)	Mardin Subregion (TRC3)	Şırnak Province (TRC33)
Southeast Anatolia Region (TRC)	Mardin Subregion (TRC3)	Siirt Province (TRC34)

== See also ==
- FIPS region codes of Turkey
- ISO 3166-2 codes of Turkey
- Subdivisions of Turkey
- List of Turkish regions by Human Development Index
