= Mardin Subregion =

Mardin Subregion Mardin Alt Bölgesi
- Subregion
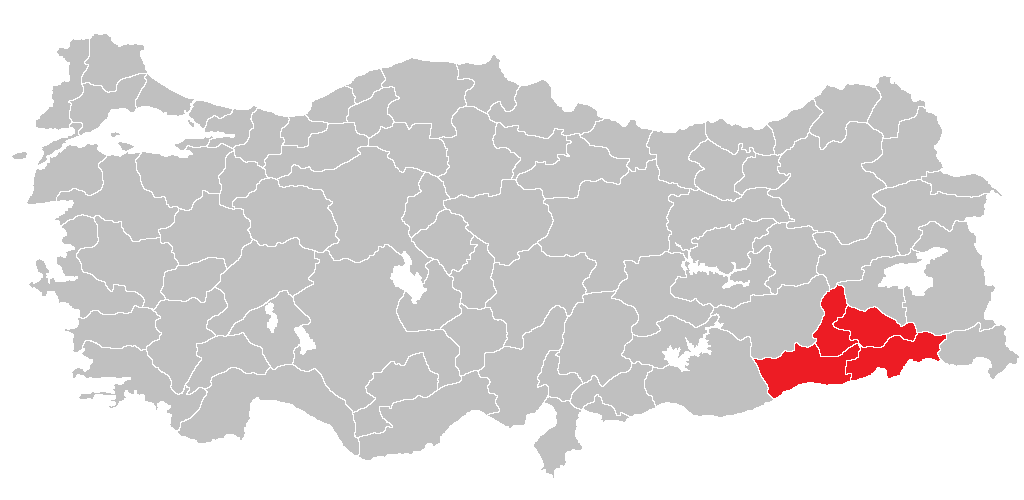
- Country: Turkey
- Region: Southeast Anatolia

Area
  - Subregion: 26,118 km^{2} (10,084 sq mi)

Population (2013)
  - Subregion: 2,116,727
  - Rank: 18th
  - Density: 81.045/km^{2} (209.90/sq mi)
  - Urban: 1,690,643
  - Rural: 426,084

The Mardin Subregion (Turkish: Mardin Alt Bölgesi) (TRC3) is a statistical subregion in Turkey.

== Provinces ==
- Mardin Province (TRC31)
- Batman Province (TRC32)
- Şırnak Province (TRC33)
- Siirt Province (TRC34)

== See also ==
- NUTS of Turkey

== Sources ==
- ESPON Database
