= Tekirdağ Subregion =

Tekirdağ Subregion Tekirdağ Alt Bölgesi
- Subregion
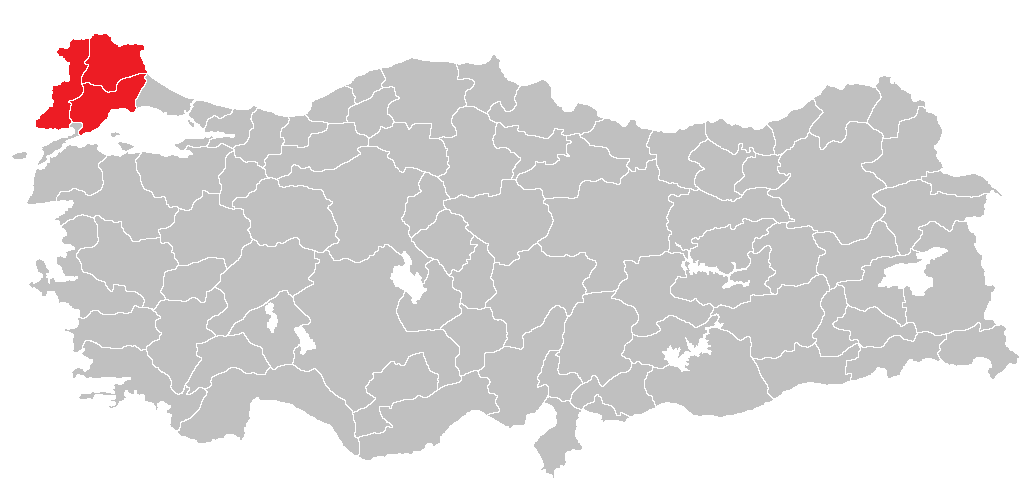
- Country: Turkey
- Region: West Marmara

Area
  - Subregion: 19,047 km^{2} (7,354 sq mi)

Population (2013)
  - Subregion: 1,613,616
  - Rank: 21st
  - Density: 84.718/km^{2} (219.42/sq mi)
  - Urban: 1,386,292
  - Rural: 227,324

The Tekirdağ Subregion (Turkish: Tekirdağ Alt Bölgesi) (TR21) is a statistical subregion in Turkey.

== Provinces ==
- Tekirdağ Province (TR211)
- Edirne Province (TR212)
- Kırklareli Province (TR213)

== See also ==
- NUTS of Turkey

== Sources ==
- ESPON Database
