= Aydın Subregion =

Aydın Subregion Aydın Alt Bölgesi
- Subregion
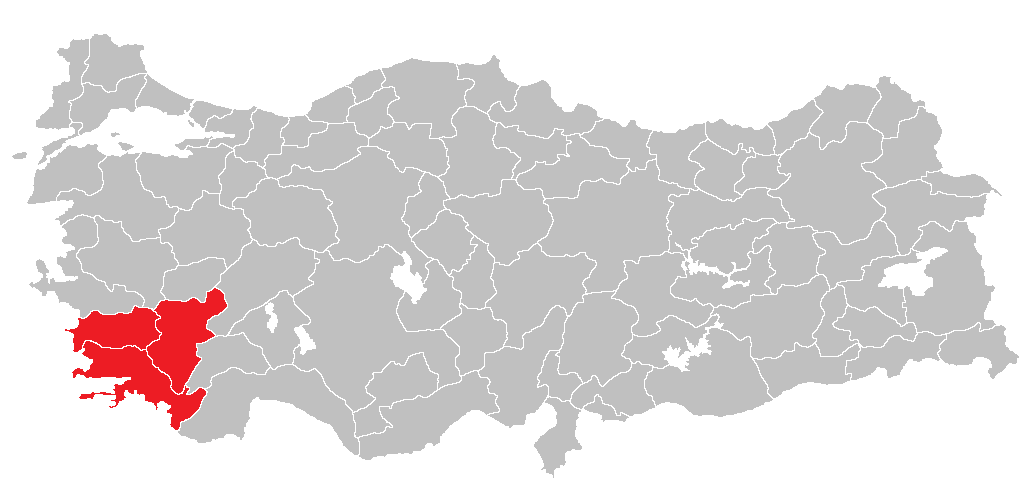
- Coordinates: 37.4286°N 28.2081°E
- Country: Turkey
- Region: Aegean

Area
  - Subregion: 33,213 km^{2} (12,824 sq mi)

Population (2013)
  - Subregion: 2,851,086
  - Rank: 10th
  - Density: 85.842/km^{2} (222.33/sq mi)
  - Urban: 2,851,086
  - Rural: 0

The Aydın Subregion (Turkish: Aydın Alt Bölgesi) (TR32) is a statistical subregion in Turkey.

== Provinces ==
- Aydın Province (TR321)
- Denizli Province (TR322)
- Muğla Province (TR323)

== See also ==
- NUTS of Turkey

== Sources ==
- ESPON Database
