= Istanbul region (statistical) =

Istanbul Region İstanbul Bölgesi
- Region
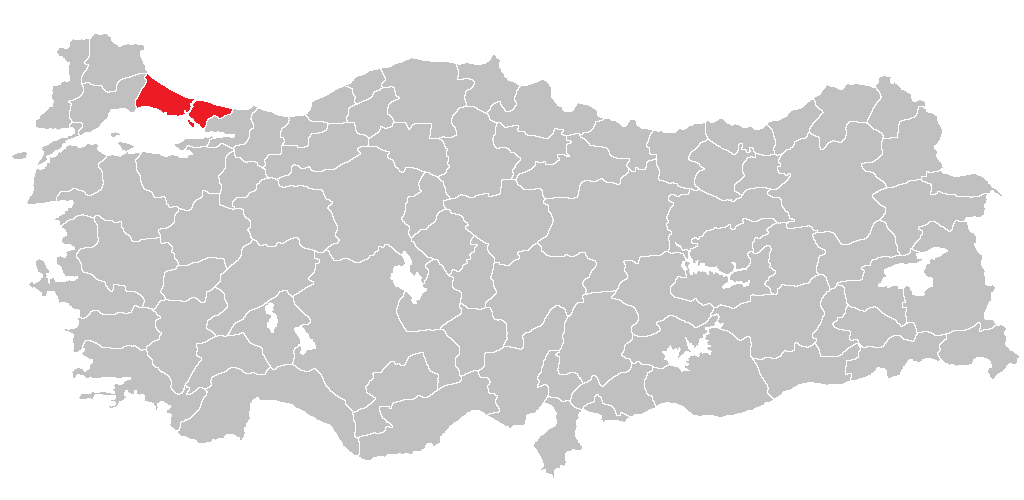
- Coordinates: 41°02′51″N 29°00′27″E
- Country: Turkey

Area
  - Region: 5,343 km^{2} (2,063 sq mi)

Population (2025)
  - Region: 15,754,053
  - Rank: 1st
  - Density: 2,949/km^{2} (7,637/sq mi)
  - Urban: 15,608,546
  - Rural: 145,507
- HDI (2023): 0.886 very high · 1st

The Istanbul Region (Turkish: İstanbul Bölgesi) (TR1) is a statistical region in Turkey.

== Subregions and provinces ==
- Istanbul Subregion (TR10)
  - Istanbul Province (TR100)

== Population ==
Historical population
Year	Pop.	±% p.a.
1927	794,444	—
1935	883,599	+1.34%
1940	991,237	+2.33%
1945	1,078,399	+1.70%
1950	1,166,477	+1.58%
1955	1,533,822	+5.63%
1960	1,882,092	+4.18%
1965	2,293,823	+4.04%
1970	3,019,032	+5.65%
1975	3,904,588	+5.28%
1980	4,741,890	+3.96%
1985	5,842,985	+4.26%
1990	7,309,190	+4.58%
1997	9,198,809	+3.34%
2000	10,018,735	+2.89%
2007	12,573,836	+3.30%
2008	12,697,164	+0.98%
2009	12,915,158	+1.72%
2010	13,255,685	+2.64%
2011	13,624,240	+2.78%
2012	13,854,740	+1.69%
2013	14,160,467	+2.21%
2014	14,377,018	+1.53%
2015	14,657,434	+1.95%
2016	14,804,116	+1.00%
2017	15,029,231	+1.52%
2018	15,067,724	+0.26%
2019	15,519,267	+3.00%
2020	15,462,452	−0.37%
2021	15,840,900	+2.45%
2022	15,907,951	+0.42%
2023	15,655,924	−1.58%
2024	15,701,602	+0.29%
2025	15,754,053	+0.33%

=== Structure of the population ===
Structure of the population

Structure of the population (31.12.2015):

Age group	Male	Female	Total	Percent
Total	7,360,499	7,296,935	14,657,434	100
0–4	587,724	556,331	1,144,055	7.80
5–9	568,124	537,896	1,106,020	7.55
10–14	542,882	509,625	1,052,507	7.18
15–19	575,240	539,624	1,114,864	7.61
20–24	579,403	578,333	1,157,736	7.90
25–29	666,252	659,863	1,326,115	9.05
30–34	715,563	699,827	1,415,390	9.66
35–39	683,531	664,917	1,348,448	9.20
40–44	594,337	579,641	1,173,978	8.00
45–49	468,168	446,633	914,801	6.24
50–54	431,752	425,264	857,016	5.85
55–59	323,784	319,358	643,142	4.39
60–64	237,339	253,981	491,320	3.35
65–69	161,569	187,171	348,740	2.38
70–74	100,159	125,951	226,110	1.54
75–79	61,899	93,013	154,912	1.05
80–84	40,996	65,543	106,539	0.73
85–89	16,489	38,630	55,119	0.38
90+	5,288	15,334	20,622	0.14

Age group	Male	Female	Total	Percent
0–14	1,698,730	1,603,852	3,302,582	22.53
15–64	5,275,369	5,167,441	10,442,810	71.25
65+	386,400	525,642	912,042	6.22

Structure of the population (31.12.2016):

Age group	Male	Female	Total	Percent
Total	7,424,390	7,379,726	14,804,116	100
0–4	594,015	563,265	1,157,280	7.82
5–9	566,728	536,225	1,102,953	7.45
10–14	536,398	505,092	1,041,490	7.03
15–19	574,597	538,799	1,113,396	7.52
20–24	578,959	579,254	1,158,213	7.82
25–29	654,062	650,043	1,304,105	8.81
30–34	694,708	681,990	1,376,698	9.30
35–39	712,537	696,155	1,408,692	9.52
40–44	601,481	589,215	1,190,696	8.04
45–49	485,294	464,358	949,652	6.41
50–54	443,985	438,268	882,253	5.96
55–59	324,432	322,128	646,560	4.37
60–64	257,676	274,134	531,810	3.59
65–69	166,430	192,350	358,780	2.42
70–74	105,311	131,210	236,521	1.60
75–79	63,647	94,569	158,216	1.07
80–84	41,076	66,311	107,387	0.73
85–89	17,347	39,042	56,389	0.38
90+	5,707	17,318	23,025	0.16

Age group	Male	Female	Total	Percent
0–14	1,697,141	1,604,582	3,301,723	22.30
15–64	5,327,731	5,234,344	10,562,075	71.34
65+	399,518	540,800	940,318	6.36

Structure of the population (31.12.2017):

Age group	Male	Female	Total	Percent
Total	7,529,491	7,499,740	15,029,231	100
0–4	595,555	564,537	1,160,092	7.72
5–9	567,008	536,845	1,103,853	7.34
10–14	545,785	514,709	1,060,494	7.06
15–19	571,017	534,535	1,105,552	7.35
20–24	585,796	587,131	1,172,927	7.80
25–29	644,630	642,682	1,287,312	8.57
30–34	688,645	678,364	1,367,009	9.10
35–39	719,284	705,934	1,425,218	9.48
40–44	615,044	603,237	1,218,281	8.11
45–49	522,234	504,084	1,026,318	6.83
50–54	442,422	434,991	877,413	5.84
55–59	346,440	345,236	691,676	4.60
60–64	263,109	280,112	543,221	3.61
65–69	176,777	202,308	379,085	2.52
70–74	110,176	137,977	248,153	1.65
75–79	68,698	100,300	168,998	1.13
80–84	41,260	66,533	107,793	0.72
85–89	19,244	41,191	60,435	0.40
90+	6,367	19,034	25,401	0.17

Age group	Male	Female	Total	Percent
0–14	1,708,348	1,616,091	3,324,439	22.12
15–64	5,398,621	5,316,306	10,714,927	71.29
65+	422,522	567,343	989,865	6.59

Structure of the population (31.12.2018):

Age group	Male	Female	Total	Percent
Total	7,542,231	7,525,493	15,067,724	100
0–4	591,648	561,003	1,152,651	7.65
5–9	566,145	535,189	1,101,334	7.31
10–14	554,711	523,264	1,077,975	7.15
15–19	560,454	524,788	1,085,242	7.20
20–24	585,938	589,280	1,175,218	7.80
25–29	635,247	636,190	1,271,437	8.44
30–34	680,311	674,342	1,354,653	8.99
35–39	712,550	702,529	1,415,079	9.39
40–44	623,215	610,848	1,234,063	8.19
45–49	544,510	529,749	1,074,259	7.13
50–54	442,343	429,757	872,100	5.79
55–59	354,192	353,072	707,264	4.70
60–64	262,447	277,457	539,904	3.58
65–69	177,818	202,611	380,429	2.52
70–74	113,954	145,195	259,149	1.72
75–79	68,448	100,076	168,524	1.12
80–84	39,266	66,374	105,640	0.70
85–89	22,292	43,348	65,640	0.44
90+	6,742	20,421	27,163	0.18

Age group	Male	Female	Total	Percent
0–14	1,712,504	1,619,456	3,331,960	22.11
15–64	5,401,207	5,328,012	10,729,219	71.21
65+	428,520	578,025	1,006,545	6.68

Structure of the population (31.12.2019):

Age group	Male	Female	Total	Percent
Total	7,790,256	7,729,011	15,519,267	100
0–4	581,736	552,035	1,133,771	7.31
5–9	580,241	548,741	1,128,982	7.27
10–14	565,881	534,392	1,100,273	7.09
15–19	563,324	526,181	1,089,505	7.02
20–24	620,290	597,584	1,217,874	7.85
25–29	665,305	649,164	1,314,469	8.47
30–34	693,476	681,692	1,375,168	8.86
35–39	721,320	708,693	1,430,013	9.21
40–44	644,655	633,554	1,278,209	8.24
45–49	578,228	567,468	1,145,696	7.38
50–54	453,346	438,690	892,036	5.75
55–59	379,429	381,868	761,297	4.91
60–64	281,093	291,685	572,778	3.69
65–69	189,853	215,807	405,660	2.61
70–74	125,966	160,274	286,240	1.84
75–79	74,215	105,751	179,966	1.16
80–84	40,761	69,489	110,250	0.71
85–89	23,911	43,994	67,905	0.44
90+	7,226	21,949	29,175	0.19

Age group	Male	Female	Total	Percent
0–14	1,727,858	1,635,168	3,363,026	21.67
15–64	5,600,466	5,476,579	11,077,045	71.38
65+	461,932	617,264	1,079,196	6.95

Structure of the population (31.12.2020):

Age group	Male	Female	Total	Percent
Total	7,750,836	7,711,616	15,462,452	100
0–4	553,827	525,891	1,079,718	6.98
5–9	582,206	551,322	1,133,528	7.33
10–14	564,773	534,128	1,098,901	7.11
15–19	552,806	516,228	1,069,034	6.91
20–24	608,631	586,216	1,194,847	7.73
25–29	654,253	638,074	1,292,327	8.36
30–34	675,023	665,501	1,340,524	8.67
35–39	696,765	688,315	1,385,080	8.96
40–44	664,768	656,982	1,321,750	8.55
45–49	580,879	571,811	1,152,690	7.45
50–54	448,438	432,123	880,561	5.69
55–59	396,979	399,401	796,380	5.15
60–64	285,003	294,499	579,502	3.75
65–69	201,849	232,558	434,407	2.81
70–74	133,753	170,415	304,168	1.97
75–79	78,180	109,960	188,140	1.22
80–84	42,756	73,082	115,838	0.75
85–89	22,392	42,081	64,473	0.42
90+	7,555	23,029	30,584	0.19

Age group	Male	Female	Total	Percent
0–14	1,700,806	1,611,341	3,312,147	21.42
15–64	5,563,545	5,449,150	11,012,695	71.22
65+	486,485	651,125	1,137,610	7.36

Structure of the population (31.12.2021):

Age group	Male	Female	Total	Percent
Total	7,933,686	7,907,214	15,840,900	100
0–4	531,698	505,272	1,036,970	6.55
5–9	598,094	566,896	1,164,990	7.35
10–14	573,172	541,314	1,114,486	7.04
15–19	563,822	526,835	1,090,657	6.89
20–24	636,065	613,224	1,249,289	7.89
25–29	680,606	659,320	1,339,926	8.46
30–34	686,762	675,109	1,361,871	8.60
35–39	691,652	684,790	1,376,442	8.69
40–44	702,258	698,864	1,401,122	8.84
45–49	593,864	589,969	1,183,833	7.47
50–54	469,914	455,923	925,837	5.84
55–59	410,677	415,144	825,821	5.21
60–64	287,473	298,853	586,326	3.70
65–69	218,419	249,909	468,328	2.96
70–74	136,103	173,937	310,040	1.96
75–79	80,901	113,790	194,691	1.23
80–84	42,887	73,239	116,126	0.73
85–89	21,623	41,827	63,450	0.40
90+	7,696	22,999	30,695	0.19

Age group	Male	Female	Total	Percent
0–14	1,702,964	1,613,482	3,316,446	20.94
15–64	5,723,093	5,618,031	11,341,124	71.59
65+	507,629	675,701	1,183,330	7.47

Structure of the population (31.12.2022):

Age group	Male	Female	Total	Percent
Total	7,955,820	7,952,131	15,907,951	100
0–4	501,209	476,502	977,711	6.15
5–9	600,478	568,566	1,169,044	7.35
10–14	574,551	542,516	1,117,067	7.02
15–19	572,767	536,448	1,109,215	6.97
20–24	632,231	609,505	1,241,736	7.81
25–29	682,380	666,593	1,348,973	8.48
30–34	675,239	665,534	1,340,773	8.43
35–39	679,642	677,233	1,356,875	8.53
40–44	703,805	704,318	1,408,123	8.85
45–49	602,470	599,543	1,202,013	7.55
50–54	502,103	490,137	992,240	6.24
55–59	406,295	407,939	814,234	5.12
60–64	303,312	315,769	619,081	3.89
65–69	220,044	252,162	472,206	2.97
70–74	141,991	179,825	321,816	2.02
75–79	82,709	117,931	200,640	1.26
80–84	45,254	76,483	121,737	0.77
85–89	21,230	41,402	62,632	0.39
90+	8,110	23,725	31,835	0.20

Age group	Male	Female	Total	Percent
0–14	1,676,238	1,587,584	3,263,822	20.52
15–64	5,760,244	5,673,019	11,433,263	71.87
65+	519,338	691,528	1,210,866	7.61

Structure of the population (31.12.2023):

Age group	Male	Female	Total	Percent
Total	7,806,787	7,849,137	15,655,924	100
0–4	458,132	436,865	894,997	5.72
5–9	585,959	554,459	1,140,418	7.28
10–14	563,631	532,128	1,095,759	7.00
15–19	572,493	538,638	1,111,131	7.10
20–24	612,213	594,834	1,207,047	7.71
25–29	667,808	660,157	1,327,965	8.48
30–34	650,875	646,326	1,297,201	8.29
35–39	655,556	660,422	1,315,978	8.40
40–44	682,696	688,212	1,370,908	8.76
45–49	598,739	597,586	1,196,325	7.64
50–54	514,693	508,899	1,023,592	6.54
55–59	402,872	400,674	803,546	5.13
60–64	309,335	322,823	632,158	4.04
65–69	221,742	252,956	474,698	3.03
70–74	145,409	182,722	328,131	2.10
75–79	87,493	126,297	213,790	1.37
80–84	46,538	77,837	124,375	0.79
85–89	21,094	42,097	63,191	0.40
90+	9,509	25,205	34,714	0.22

Age group	Male	Female	Total	Percent
0–14	1,607,722	1,523,452	3,131,174	20.00
15–64	5,667,280	5,618,571	11,285,851	72.09
65+	531,785	707,114	1,238,899	7.91

Structure of the population (31.12.2024):

Age group	Male	Female	Total	Percent
Total	7,820,462	7,881,140	15,701,602	100
0–4	429,555	408,807	838,362	5.34
5–9	566,018	537,088	1,103,106	7.02
10–14	568,340	536,580	1,104,920	7.04
15–19	575,985	544,610	1,120,595	7.14
20–24	606,285	589,949	1,196,234	7.62
25–29	665,051	656,275	1,321,326	8.42
30–34	647,249	643,513	1,290,762	8.22
35–39	644,832	652,689	1,297,521	8.26
40–44	672,688	680,889	1,353,577	8.62
45–49	606,562	608,964	1,215,526	7.74
50–54	538,857	535,921	1,074,778	6.85
55–59	408,152	402,711	810,863	5.16
60–64	328,066	343,173	671,239	4.27
65–69	233,895	261,058	494,953	3.15
70–74	152,369	191,006	343,375	2.19
75–79	95,096	136,973	232,069	1.48
80–84	49,426	81,600	131,026	0.83
85–89	21,943	43,768	65,711	0.42
90+	10,093	25,566	35,659	0.23

Age group	Male	Female	Total	Percent
0–14	1,563,913	1,482,475	3,046,388	19.40
15–64	5,693,727	5,658,694	11,352,421	72.30
65+	562,822	739,971	1,302,793	8.30

Structure of the population (31.12.2025):

Age group	Male	Female	Total	Percent
Total	7,851,344	7,902,709	15,754,053	100
0–4	403,810	383,491	787,301	5.00
5–9	538,243	510,890	1,049,133	6.66
10–14	570,227	539,248	1,109,475	7.04
15–19	578,252	546,958	1,125,210	7.14
20–24	609,387	588,032	1,197,419	7.60
25–29	669,921	658,906	1,328,827	8.43
30–34	649,614	641,540	1,291,154	8.20
35–39	637,419	644,842	1,282,261	8.14
40–44	657,260	667,462	1,324,722	8.41
45–49	636,315	636,089	1,272,404	8.08
50–54	547,222	544,307	1,091,529	6.93
55–59	409,681	400,718	810,399	5.14
60–64	347,823	361,901	709,724	4.51
65–69	240,910	265,282	506,192	3.21
70–74	164,763	207,147	371,910	2.36
75–79	103,088	146,778	249,866	1.58
80–84	53,546	86,345	139,891	0.89
85–89	23,761	46,838	70,599	0.45
90+	10,102	25,935	36,037	0.23

Age group	Male	Female	Total	Percent
0–14	1,512,280	1,433,629	2,945,909	18.70
15–64	5,742,894	5,690,755	11,433,649	72.58
65+	596,170	778,325	1,374,495	8.72

== Internal immigration ==
Between December 31, 2024 and December 31, 2025
Region	Population	Immigrants	Emigrants	Net immigrants	Net immigration rate
Istanbul	15,754,053	329,912	371,258	-41,346	-2,62

=== State register location of Istanbul residents ===
As of December 31, 2025
Region	Population	Percentage
Istanbul	2,123,134	13.5
West Marmara	486,647	3.1
Aegean	320,890	2.0
East Marmara	512,748	3.2
West Anatolia	315,407	2.0
Mediterranean	555,427	3.5
Central Anatolia	1,399,209	8.9
West Black Sea	2,623,436	16.7
East Black Sea	1,958,444	12.4
Northeast Anatolia	1,797,590	11.4
Central East Anatolia	1,560,192	9.9
Southeast Anatolia	1,493,653	9.5
Foreign National	607,276	3.9
Total	15,754,053	100

== Marital status of 15+ population by gender ==
As of December 31, 2025
Gender	Never married	%	Married	%	Divorced	%	Spouse died	%	Total
Male	2,300,825	36.3	3,645,230	57.5	316,951	5.0	76,058	1.2	6,339,064
Female	1,846,732	28.5	3,680,321	56.9	447,008	6.9	495,019	7.7	6,469,080
Total	4,147,557	32.4	7,325,551	57.2	763,959	6.0	571,077	4.5	12,808,144

== Education status of 15+ population by gender ==
As of December 31, 2025
Gender	Illiterate	%	Literate with no diploma	%	Primary school	%	Primary education	%	Middle school	%	High school	%	College or university	%	Master's degree	%	Doctorate	%	Unknown	%	Total
Male	21,035	0.3	56,219	0.9	675,329	11.1	460,157	7.6	1,167,938	19.2	1,955,161	32.2	1,422,763	23.4	217,637	3.6	37,611	0.6	59,022	1.0	6,072,872
Female	161,414	2.6	183,846	3.0	1,092,347	17.7	347,272	5.6	940,753	15.2	1,621,770	26.2	1,513,435	24.5	225,331	3.6	33,206	0.5	68,707	1.1	6,188,081
All genders	182,449	1.5	240,065	2.0	1,767,676	14.4	807,429	6.6	2,108,691	17.2	3,576,931	29.2	2,936,198	23.9	442,968	3.6	70,817	0.6	127,729	1.0	12,260,953

== See also ==
- NUTS of Turkey

== Sources ==
- ESPON Database
