= List of European regions by life expectancy =

Regions of European countries are listed by life expectancy in the following lists.

== Estimate of Eurostat (2014—2023) ==
=== Table ===
This is a list of European regions (Nomenclature of Territorial Units for Statistics regions) according to estimation of Eurostat. Eurostat calculates the life expectancy based on the information provided by national statistics institutes affiliated to Eurostat. The list presents statistics for 2014—2023, as of 24 June 2025. By default, regions within country are sorted by overall life expectancy in 2023. Countries are sorted by the most favorable for life expectancy region inside them. Data for some regions are marked at the Eurostat site as provisional or estimated.

code	country	region	2014				2014 →2019	2019				2019 →2023	2023				2014 →2023
code	country	region	overall	male	female	F Δ M	2014 →2019	overall	male	female	F Δ M	2019 →2023	overall	male	female	F Δ M	2014 →2023
ES30	Spain	Madrid	84.9	81.9	87.6	5.7	0.9	85.8	83.0	88.2	5.2	0.3	86.1	83.4	88.3	4.9	1.2
ES22	Spain	Navarre	83.9	80.9	86.9	6.0	1.1	85.0	82.4	87.5	5.1	0.0	85.0	82.4	87.6	5.2	1.1
ES41	Spain	Castile and León	84.1	81.2	87.2	6.0	0.6	84.7	81.8	87.6	5.8	0.2	84.9	82.1	87.7	5.6	0.8
ES21	Spain	Basque Country	83.9	80.7	86.9	6.2	0.6	84.5	81.4	87.5	6.1	0.2	84.7	81.8	87.4	5.6	0.8
ES13	Spain	Cantabria	83.1	79.9	86.3	6.4	0.8	83.9	81.1	86.7	5.6	0.5	84.4	81.4	87.3	5.9	1.3
ES23	Spain	La Rioja	84.2	81.0	87.5	6.5	0.0	84.2	81.3	87.1	5.8	0.1	84.3	81.4	87.1	5.7	0.1
ES51	Spain	Catalonia	83.6	80.6	86.5	5.9	0.7	84.3	81.3	87.1	5.8	−0.1	84.2	81.4	86.9	5.5	0.6
ES24	Spain	Aragon	83.2	80.3	86.3	6.0	1.2	84.4	81.5	87.2	5.7	−0.2	84.2	81.3	87.1	5.8	1.0
ES42	Spain	Castilla–La Mancha	83.7	81.0	86.5	5.5	0.2	83.9	81.5	86.5	5.0	0.1	84.0	81.5	86.6	5.1	0.3
ES53	Spain	Balearic Islands	83.0	80.2	85.7	5.5	1.2	84.2	81.7	86.6	4.9	−0.2	84.0	81.5	86.4	4.9	1.0
ES11	Spain	Galicia	83.4	80.1	86.6	6.5	0.6	84.0	81.0	87.0	6.0	0.0	84.0	80.8	87.0	6.2	0.6
ES52	Spain	Valencian Community	82.8	80.2	85.5	5.3	0.7	83.5	80.7	86.3	5.6	−0.1	83.4	80.7	86.1	5.4	0.6
ES43	Spain	Extremadura	82.7	79.8	85.7	5.9	0.4	83.1	80.2	86.2	6.0	0.2	83.3	80.7	86.0	5.3	0.6
ES12	Spain	Asturias	82.5	79.2	85.6	6.4	0.7	83.2	80.1	86.2	6.1	0.1	83.3	80.4	85.9	5.5	0.8
ES62	Spain	Murcia	82.8	80.3	85.3	5.0	0.1	82.9	80.3	85.4	5.1	0.1	83.0	80.5	85.6	5.1	0.2
ES70	Spain	Canary Islands (in the Atlantic Ocean)	82.5	79.8	85.2	5.4	1.0	83.5	80.9	86.2	5.3	−0.7	82.8	80.2	85.4	5.2	0.3
ES61	Spain	Andalusia	82.1	79.2	84.9	5.7	0.5	82.6	79.8	85.3	5.5	0.1	82.7	80.0	85.4	5.4	0.6
ES64	Spain	Melilla (autonomous city in Africa)	80.7	77.9	83.5	5.6	0.7	81.4	78.8	84.1	5.3	0.2	81.6	80.1	83.3	3.2	0.9
ES63	Spain	Ceuta (autonomous city in Africa)	80.6	77.7	84.0	6.3	0.8	81.4	79.0	83.9	4.9	−0.1	81.3	78.9	83.6	4.7	0.7
CH07	Switzerland	Ticino	84.6	81.9	87.1	5.2	0.4	85.0	83.0	86.9	3.9	0.2	85.2	83.6	86.6	3.0	0.6
CH01	Switzerland	Lake Geneva region	83.9	81.5	86.2	4.7	0.7	84.6	82.4	86.6	4.2	0.2	84.8	82.8	86.6	3.8	0.9
CH06	Switzerland	Central Switzerland	83.5	81.3	85.6	4.3	0.9	84.4	82.7	86.2	3.5	0.1	84.5	82.6	86.4	3.8	1.0
CH04	Switzerland	Zurich	83.4	81.5	85.2	3.7	0.6	84.0	82.3	85.7	3.4	0.4	84.4	82.7	86.1	3.4	1.0
CH03	Switzerland	Northwestern Switzerland	83.3	81.2	85.2	4.0	0.7	84.0	82.3	85.7	3.4	0.3	84.3	82.6	85.8	3.2	1.0
CH05	Switzerland	Eastern Switzerland	82.8	80.5	85.0	4.5	0.8	83.6	81.6	85.5	3.9	0.3	83.9	81.9	85.8	3.9	1.1
CH02	Switzerland	Espace Mittelland	82.9	80.7	85.0	4.3	0.7	83.6	81.8	85.4	3.6	0.1	83.7	81.8	85.5	3.7	0.8
ITH2	Italy	Trento (Trentino)	84.4	81.7	87.0	5.3	0.5	84.9	82.4	87.2	4.8	0.2	85.1	82.8	87.3	4.5	0.7
ITH1	Italy	South Tyrol (Bolzano)	84.0	81.6	86.2	4.6	0.5	84.5	82.2	86.7	4.5	0.5	85.0	82.8	87.0	4.2	1.0
ITI3	Italy	Marche	84.0	81.4	86.4	5.0	0.4	84.4	82.3	86.4	4.1	0.1	84.5	82.5	86.3	3.8	0.5
ITH3	Italy	Veneto	83.8	81.1	86.3	5.2	0.5	84.3	82.0	86.4	4.4	0.2	84.5	82.3	86.5	4.2	0.7
ITI1	Italy	Tuscany	83.8	81.4	86.1	4.7	0.3	84.1	82.0	86.1	4.1	0.3	84.4	82.4	86.2	3.8	0.6
ITC4	Italy	Lombardy	83.9	81.3	86.2	4.9	0.3	84.2	81.9	86.4	4.5	0.1	84.3	82.2	86.2	4.0	0.4
ITC2	Italy	Aosta Valley	82.9	79.9	85.7	5.8	0.7	83.6	80.7	86.5	5.8	0.6	84.2	82.2	86.0	3.8	1.3
ITI2	Italy	Umbria	84.0	81.5	86.4	4.9	0.5	84.5	82.3	86.5	4.2	−0.4	84.1	82.1	86.0	3.9	0.1
ITH5	Italy	Emilia-Romagna	83.7	81.3	85.8	4.5	0.3	84.0	81.9	85.9	4.0	0.1	84.1	82.1	86.0	3.9	0.4
ITH4	Italy	Friuli-Venezia Giulia	83.4	80.7	85.9	5.2	0.5	83.9	81.6	86.0	4.4	0.2	84.1	81.9	86.1	4.2	0.7
ITC3	Italy	Liguria	83.3	80.6	85.7	5.1	0.2	83.5	81.1	85.7	4.6	0.2	83.7	81.5	85.7	4.2	0.4
ITC1	Italy	Piedmont	83.2	80.7	85.5	4.8	0.1	83.3	81.0	85.5	4.5	0.1	83.4	81.3	85.4	4.1	0.2
ITF4	Italy	Apulia	83.2	80.8	85.4	4.6	0.5	83.7	81.6	85.7	4.1	−0.5	83.2	81.2	85.1	3.9	0.0
ITI4	Italy	Lazio	83.1	80.5	85.4	4.9	0.7	83.8	81.6	85.8	4.2	−0.6	83.2	81.1	85.1	4.0	0.1
ITG2	Italy	Sardinia	83.2	80.3	85.9	5.6	0.4	83.6	80.7	86.4	5.7	−0.4	83.2	80.5	86.0	5.5	0.0
ITF1	Italy	Abruzzo	83.1	80.5	85.6	5.1	0.6	83.7	81.4	85.8	4.4	−0.6	83.1	80.8	85.5	4.7	0.0
ITF5	Italy	Basilicata	83.1	80.6	85.6	5.0	−0.1	83.0	80.7	85.2	4.5	−0.1	82.9	80.7	85.1	4.4	−0.2
ITF2	Italy	Molise	82.8	79.8	85.9	6.1	0.8	83.6	80.9	86.3	5.4	−0.9	82.7	80.3	85.1	4.8	−0.1
ITF6	Italy	Calabria	82.5	79.9	85.0	5.1	0.3	82.8	80.5	85.0	4.5	−0.6	82.2	80.1	84.4	4.3	−0.3
ITG1	Italy	Sicily	82.2	79.9	84.3	4.4	0.1	82.3	80.2	84.3	4.1	−0.5	81.8	79.9	83.7	3.8	−0.4
ITF3	Italy	Campania	81.5	79.0	83.8	4.8	0.6	82.1	79.9	84.2	4.3	−0.5	81.6	79.5	83.6	4.1	0.1
FI20	Finland	Åland	83.0	81.3	84.7	3.4	0.9	83.9	81.7	86.4	4.7	1.2	85.1	82.0	88.5	6.5	2.1
FI1B	Finland	Helsinki-Uusimaa	81.8	79.1	84.3	5.2	0.8	82.6	79.9	85.1	5.2	−0.4	82.2	79.7	84.5	4.8	0.4
FI19	Finland	Western Finland	81.4	78.4	84.3	5.9	0.9	82.3	79.7	85.0	5.3	−0.9	81.4	78.8	84.2	5.4	0.0
FI1C	Finland	Southern Finland	81.1	78.1	84.0	5.9	0.6	81.7	78.7	84.7	6.0	−0.3	81.4	78.7	84.2	5.5	0.3
FI1D	Finland	North & East Finland	80.7	77.6	83.9	6.3	0.8	81.5	78.9	84.2	5.3	−0.3	81.2	78.7	83.9	5.2	0.5
FR10	France	Île-de-France (Paris Region)	84.4	81.4	87.1	5.7	0.2	84.6	81.8	87.1	5.3	0.3	84.9	82.3	87.3	5.0	0.5
FRK2	France	Rhône-Alpes	84.0	80.9	86.9	6.0	0.1	84.1	81.2	86.8	5.6	0.3	84.4	81.7	86.9	5.2	0.4
FRM0	France	Corsica	83.2	80.4	86.1	5.7	0.8	84.0	81.5	86.5	5.0	−0.1	83.9	81.7	85.9	4.2	0.7
FRL0	France	Provence-Alpes-Côte d'Azur	83.4	80.1	86.4	6.3	0.0	83.4	80.5	86.2	5.7	0.3	83.7	80.8	86.3	5.5	0.3
FRJ2	France	Midi-Pyrénées	83.7	80.5	86.7	6.2	0.1	83.8	81.0	86.4	5.4	−0.2	83.6	81.1	86.1	5.0	−0.1
FRI1	France	Aquitaine	83.1	79.9	86.1	6.2	0.3	83.4	80.3	86.3	6.0	0.0	83.4	80.6	86.1	5.5	0.3
FRG0	France	Pays de la Loire	83.5	79.9	86.9	7.0	−0.1	83.4	80.1	86.6	6.5	0.0	83.4	80.4	86.4	6.0	−0.1
FRF1	France	Alsace	82.8	79.7	85.9	6.2	0.5	83.3	80.5	85.9	5.4	−0.3	83.0	80.4	85.5	5.1	0.2
FRJ1	France	Languedoc-Roussillon	82.8	79.5	86.0	6.5	0.3	83.1	80.1	86.0	5.9	−0.4	82.7	79.7	85.6	5.9	−0.1
FRI3	France	Poitou-Charentes	83.2	79.7	86.5	6.8	−0.4	82.8	79.6	85.9	6.3	−0.2	82.6	79.7	85.4	5.7	−0.6
FRB0	France	Centre-Val de Loire (Centre Region)	82.9	79.4	86.3	6.9	−0.2	82.7	79.6	85.7	6.1	−0.1	82.6	79.6	85.5	5.9	−0.3
FRH0	France	Brittany	82.3	78.6	85.8	7.2	0.2	82.5	79.0	85.9	6.9	0.0	82.5	79.6	85.4	5.8	0.2
FRK1	France	Auvergne	82.5	78.9	86.1	7.2	0.0	82.5	79.3	85.7	6.4	−0.1	82.4	79.5	85.3	5.8	−0.1
FRC2	France	Franche-Comté	82.7	79.4	86.0	6.6	0.1	82.8	79.7	85.9	6.2	−0.5	82.3	79.5	85.1	5.6	−0.4
FRI2	France	Limousin	82.7	79.0	86.4	7.4	−0.4	82.3	78.9	85.7	6.8	0.0	82.3	79.3	85.3	6.0	−0.4
FRY4	France	Réunion (in the Indian Ocean)	81.0	77.3	84.4	7.1	0.3	81.3	77.5	85.0	7.5	1.0	82.3	79.3	85.2	5.9	1.3
FRD1	France	Lower Normandy	82.4	78.8	85.9	7.1	0.1	82.5	79.0	85.8	6.8	−0.2	82.3	79.1	85.4	6.3	−0.1
FRC1	France	Burgundy	82.4	78.8	85.9	7.1	0.0	82.4	79.3	85.6	6.3	−0.2	82.2	79.2	85.3	6.1	−0.2
FRF3	France	Lorraine	81.9	78.6	85.1	6.5	0.1	82.0	79.0	84.9	5.9	−0.1	81.9	79.1	84.7	5.6	0.0
FRD2	France	Upper Normandy	81.5	77.9	84.9	7.0	0.3	81.8	78.5	85.0	6.5	0.1	81.9	78.9	84.9	6.0	0.4
FRF2	France	Champagne-Ardenne	81.9	78.3	85.3	7.0	−0.1	81.8	78.4	85.1	6.7	0.0	81.8	78.6	84.9	6.3	−0.1
FRY2	France	Martinique (in the Caribbean)	81.5	78.2	84.4	6.2	0.6	82.1	78.7	85.2	6.5	−0.4	81.7	78.6	84.3	5.7	0.2
FRE2	France	Picardy	81.1	77.7	84.4	6.7	0.3	81.4	78.3	84.5	6.2	0.0	81.4	78.5	84.3	5.8	0.3
FRE1	France	Nord-Pas-de-Calais	80.6	76.8	84.2	7.4	0.5	81.1	77.6	84.4	6.8	0.1	81.2	77.9	84.3	6.4	0.6
FRY1	France	Guadeloupe (incl. Saint Martin, in the Caribbean)	80.6	76.4	84.6	8.2	1.2	81.8	77.8	85.5	7.7	−1.2	80.6	76.6	84.1	7.5	0.0
FRY3	France	French Guiana (in South America)	—	—	—	—	—	—	—	—	—	—	79.3	76.1	82.5	6.4	—
FRY5	France	Mayotte (in the Indian Ocean)	77.0	75.4	78.7	3.3	−1.1	75.9	75.5	76.3	0.8	−1.0	74.9	73.5	76.2	2.7	−2.1
LI00	Liechtenstein	Liechtenstein	82.1	81.0	83.2	2.2	2.2	84.3	82.6	85.8	3.2	0.3	84.6	82.4	86.9	4.5	2.5
SE11	Sweden	Stockholm	82.7	80.9	84.4	3.5	1.2	83.9	81.9	85.7	3.8	0.6	84.5	82.8	86.0	3.2	1.8
SE21	Sweden	Småland and the islands	82.7	80.7	84.7	4.0	0.9	83.6	81.9	85.3	3.4	−0.1	83.5	82.0	85.1	3.1	0.8
SE23	Sweden	West Sweden	82.4	80.5	84.4	3.9	0.7	83.1	81.4	84.7	3.3	0.3	83.4	81.7	85.0	3.3	1.0
SE12	Sweden	East Middle Sweden	82.5	80.7	84.2	3.5	0.5	83.0	81.4	84.7	3.3	0.2	83.2	81.6	84.9	3.3	0.7
SE22	Sweden	South Sweden	82.2	80.2	84.2	4.0	0.9	83.1	81.6	84.6	3.0	−0.1	83.0	81.3	84.8	3.5	0.8
SE31	Sweden	North Middle Sweden	81.7	79.8	83.5	3.7	1.0	82.7	80.8	84.6	3.8	0.1	82.8	81.2	84.6	3.4	1.1
SE33	Sweden	Upper Norrland	81.5	79.6	83.6	4.0	0.7	82.2	80.6	83.8	3.2	0.2	82.4	80.6	84.3	3.7	0.9
SE32	Sweden	Middle Norrland	81.1	79.4	82.9	3.5	1.0	82.1	80.4	83.9	3.5	0.2	82.3	80.8	83.9	3.1	1.2
BE24	Belgium	Flemish Brabant	82.6	80.1	85.0	4.9	0.8	83.4	81.3	85.3	4.0	0.6	84.0	82.1	85.9	3.8	1.4
BE22	Belgium	Limburg	82.7	80.5	85.0	4.5	0.6	83.3	81.3	85.3	4.0	0.3	83.6	81.8	85.5	3.7	0.9
BE21	Belgium	Antwerp	82.2	80.1	84.3	4.2	0.8	83.0	81.2	84.7	3.5	0.5	83.5	81.7	85.2	3.5	1.3
BE31	Belgium	Walloon Brabant	81.7	79.1	84.2	5.1	1.3	83.0	80.6	85.1	4.5	0.4	83.4	81.1	85.5	4.4	1.7
BE25	Belgium	West Flanders	82.3	79.6	85.0	5.4	0.9	83.2	80.7	85.7	5.0	0.1	83.3	81.3	85.4	4.1	1.0
BE23	Belgium	East Flanders	82.1	79.3	84.8	5.5	0.5	82.6	80.2	84.9	4.7	0.3	82.9	80.8	84.9	4.1	0.8
BE10	Belgium	Brussels	81.1	78.2	83.7	5.5	0.5	81.6	79.1	83.9	4.8	0.5	82.1	79.7	84.3	4.6	1.0
BE35	Belgium	Namur	79.4	76.7	82.1	5.4	0.9	80.3	77.8	82.7	4.9	0.6	80.9	78.9	82.8	3.9	1.5
BE33	Belgium	Liège	79.9	77.3	82.4	5.1	0.7	80.6	78.5	82.5	4.0	0.3	80.9	78.8	82.8	4.0	1.0
BE34	Belgium	Luxembourg	80.5	77.2	83.7	6.5	0.1	80.6	77.5	83.8	6.3	0.1	80.7	78.3	83.1	4.8	0.2
BE32	Belgium	Hainaut	78.9	75.9	81.9	6.0	0.7	79.6	76.6	82.6	6.0	0.2	79.8	77.1	82.4	5.3	0.9
EL41	Greece	North Aegean	81.9	79.4	84.5	5.1	0.8	82.7	80.3	85.2	4.9	1.1	83.8	81.4	86.2	4.8	1.9
EL54	Greece	Epirus	83.5	81.0	86.2	5.2	0.5	84.0	81.7	86.4	4.7	−0.3	83.7	81.0	86.5	5.5	0.2
EL42	Greece	South Aegean	81.6	79.2	84.2	5.0	0.7	82.3	80.5	84.3	3.8	0.4	82.7	80.6	84.8	4.2	1.1
EL43	Greece	Crete	82.0	79.2	84.9	5.7	0.1	82.1	79.4	84.9	5.5	0.3	82.4	80.2	84.8	4.6	0.4
EL53	Greece	Western Macedonia	82.2	79.9	84.7	4.8	0.3	82.5	80.1	85.0	4.9	−0.3	82.2	79.9	84.7	4.8	0.0
EL62	Greece	Ionian Islands	81.7	79.3	84.1	4.8	−0.3	81.4	79.6	83.2	3.6	0.4	81.8	79.6	84.1	4.5	0.1
EL64	Greece	Central Greece	81.9	79.3	84.6	5.3	−0.1	81.8	79.5	84.2	4.7	0.0	81.8	78.9	84.9	6.0	−0.1
EL63	Greece	Western Greece	81.5	78.5	84.7	6.2	0.0	81.5	79.1	83.9	4.8	0.2	81.7	79.2	84.4	5.2	0.2
EL52	Greece	Central Macedonia	81.2	78.5	83.9	5.4	0.5	81.7	79.4	84.0	4.6	0.0	81.7	79.2	84.2	5.0	0.5
EL30	Greece	Attica	81.1	78.3	83.8	5.5	0.1	81.2	78.4	83.8	5.4	0.5	81.7	79.0	84.2	5.2	0.6
EL65	Greece	Peloponnese	82.0	79.7	84.5	4.8	0.1	82.1	79.5	84.9	5.4	−0.6	81.5	79.0	84.2	5.2	−0.5
EL61	Greece	Thessaly	81.7	78.9	84.5	5.6	0.6	82.3	79.7	85.1	5.4	−0.8	81.5	78.9	84.2	5.3	−0.2
EL51	Greece	Eastern Macedonia and Thrace	80.6	78.2	83.0	4.8	0.5	81.1	78.9	83.2	4.3	−0.4	80.7	77.9	83.5	5.6	0.1
NO08	Norway	Oslo and Viken	—	—	—	—	—	—	—	—	—	—	83.4	81.8	84.9	3.1	—
NO0A	Norway	Northern Norway	—	—	—	—	—	—	—	—	—	—	83.3	81.6	85.0	3.4	—
NO06	Norway	Trøndelag	82.3	80.3	84.2	3.9	0.8	83.1	81.5	84.7	3.2	0.1	83.2	82.0	84.4	2.4	0.9
NO09	Norway	Agder and South-Eastern Norway	—	—	—	—	—	—	—	—	—	—	82.8	81.1	84.5	3.4	—
NO07	Norway	Northern Norway	81.7	79.4	84.1	4.7	0.1	81.8	80.0	83.7	3.7	0.6	82.4	80.3	84.6	4.3	0.7
NO02	Norway	Hedmark and Oppland	81.2	78.9	83.4	4.5	0.8	82.0	80.5	83.5	3.0	0.0	82.0	80.9	83.1	2.2	0.8
NO01	Norway	Oslo and Akershus	82.7	80.6	84.6	4.0	1.1	83.8	82.0	85.4	3.4	—	—	—	—	—	—
NO05	Norway	Western Norway	82.8	80.6	85.1	4.5	0.8	83.6	81.7	85.4	3.7	—	—	—	—	—	—
NO04	Norway	Agder and Rogaland	82.5	80.4	84.5	4.1	0.5	83.0	81.3	84.7	3.4	—	—	—	—	—	—
NO03	Norway	South-Eastern Norway	81.7	79.9	83.4	3.5	1.0	82.7	80.9	84.4	3.5	—	—	—	—	—	—
LU00	Luxembourg	Luxembourg	82.3	79.4	85.2	5.8	0.4	82.7	80.2	85.2	5.0	0.7	83.4	81.7	85.0	3.3	1.1
MT00	Malta	Malta	82.0	79.7	84.2	4.5	0.7	82.7	81.0	84.4	3.4	0.7	83.4	81.6	85.2	3.6	1.4
IE06	Ireland	Eastern and Midland Region	81.8	79.9	83.6	3.7	1.2	83.0	81.0	84.9	3.9	0.3	83.3	81.6	85.0	3.4	1.5
IE04	Ireland	Northern and Western Region	81.5	79.3	83.9	4.6	1.4	82.9	81.1	84.7	3.6	0.0	82.9	80.9	84.9	4.0	1.4
IE05	Ireland	Southern Region, Ireland	80.8	78.6	83.0	4.4	1.6	82.4	80.4	84.3	3.9	−0.1	82.3	80.6	84.1	3.5	1.5
AT33	Austria	Tyrol	82.8	80.7	84.7	4.0	0.2	83.0	80.8	85.1	4.3	0.3	83.3	81.1	85.5	4.4	0.5
AT34	Austria	Vorarlberg	83.1	80.3	85.7	5.4	0.2	83.3	81.1	85.3	4.2	0.0	83.3	80.9	85.7	4.8	0.2
AT32	Austria	Salzburg	82.6	80.0	85.0	5.0	0.2	82.8	80.5	85.0	4.5	−0.1	82.7	80.7	84.6	3.9	0.1
AT31	Austria	Upper Austria	82.0	79.4	84.5	5.1	0.3	82.3	80.1	84.4	4.3	−0.2	82.1	79.9	84.4	4.5	0.1
AT11	Austria	Burgenland	81.4	79.3	83.5	4.2	0.5	81.9	79.4	84.4	5.0	0.2	82.1	79.9	84.3	4.4	0.7
AT22	Austria	Styria	82.0	79.5	84.3	4.8	0.2	82.2	79.6	84.7	5.1	−0.2	82.0	79.5	84.4	4.9	0.0
AT21	Austria	Carinthia	81.8	79.1	84.3	5.2	0.4	82.2	79.6	84.7	5.1	−0.3	81.9	79.1	84.7	5.6	0.1
AT12	Austria	Lower Austria	81.3	78.8	83.7	4.9	0.4	81.7	79.5	83.8	4.3	−0.2	81.5	79.0	84.0	5.0	0.2
AT13	Austria	Vienna	80.5	77.9	82.8	4.9	0.6	81.1	78.6	83.4	4.8	−0.1	81.0	78.6	83.2	4.6	0.5
PT11	Portugal	North Region	81.7	78.4	84.8	6.4	0.7	82.4	79.3	85.2	5.9	0.8	83.2	80.4	85.9	5.5	1.5
PT19	Portugal	Central Region	—	—	—	—	—	—	—	—	—	—	82.9	80.1	85.7	5.6	—
PT1A	Portugal	Lisbon metropolitan area	—	—	—	—	—	—	—	—	—	—	82.8	79.8	85.4	5.6	—
PT1D	Portugal	West and Tagus Valley	—	—	—	—	—	—	—	—	—	—	82.2	79.3	85.0	5.7	—
PT1B	Portugal	Península de Setúbal	—	—	—	—	—	—	—	—	—	—	81.4	78.6	84.1	5.5	—
PT15	Portugal	Algarve	80.9	77.1	84.9	7.8	−0.2	80.7	76.7	84.8	8.1	0.3	81.0	77.8	84.4	6.6	0.1
PT1C	Portugal	Alentejo Region	—	—	—	—	—	—	—	—	—	—	80.8	77.7	84.2	6.5	—
PT30	Portugal	Madeira (in the Atlantic Ocean)	77.4	73.2	81.1	7.9	1.4	78.8	75.1	82.0	6.9	1.8	80.6	76.8	84.0	7.2	3.2
PT20	Portugal	Azores (in the Atlantic Ocean)	77.5	73.7	81.4	7.7	1.3	78.8	76.0	81.5	5.5	0.7	79.5	76.2	82.8	6.6	2.0
PT17	Portugal	Lisbon metropolitan area	81.7	78.2	84.8	6.6	0.5	82.2	79.1	85.0	5.9	—	—	—	—	—	—
PT16	Portugal	Central Region	81.5	78.5	84.5	6.0	0.5	82.0	78.9	84.9	6.0	—	—	—	—	—	—
PT18	Portugal	Alentejo Region	80.8	77.8	83.7	5.9	−0.1	80.7	77.3	84.0	6.7	—	—	—	—	—	—
SI04	Slovenia	Western Slovenia	82.4	79.6	85.0	5.4	0.4	82.8	80.1	85.2	5.1	0.3	83.1	80.4	85.6	5.2	0.7
SI03	Slovenia	Eastern Slovenia	80.3	77.1	83.4	6.3	0.4	80.7	77.6	84.0	6.4	0.4	81.1	78.1	84.4	6.3	0.8
CY00	Cyprus	Cyprus	82.3	80.3	84.3	4.0	0.0	82.3	80.3	84.4	4.1	0.6	82.9	80.9	84.9	4.0	0.6
DE14	Germany	Tübingen	82.4	79.9	84.8	4.9	0.0	82.4	80.3	84.6	4.3	0.4	82.8	80.7	84.8	4.1	0.4
DE21	Germany	Upper Bavaria	82.6	80.4	84.6	4.2	0.2	82.8	80.9	84.7	3.8	−0.1	82.7	80.6	84.8	4.2	0.1
DE11	Germany	Stuttgart	82.5	80.2	84.7	4.5	0.1	82.6	80.4	84.7	4.3	0.0	82.6	80.4	84.7	4.3	0.1
DE13	Germany	Freiburg	82.2	80.0	84.2	4.2	0.1	82.3	80.2	84.4	4.2	0.0	82.3	80.3	84.2	3.9	0.1
DE27	Germany	Swabia	82.0	79.6	84.3	4.7	0.1	82.1	80.0	84.2	4.2	−0.1	82.0	79.9	84.2	4.3	0.0
DE12	Germany	Karlsruhe	81.9	79.6	84.0	4.4	−0.1	81.8	79.6	84.0	4.4	0.2	82.0	79.8	84.1	4.3	0.1
DED2	Germany	Dresden	81.6	78.6	84.6	6.0	0.3	81.9	79.1	84.8	5.7	0.0	81.9	79.0	85.0	6.0	0.3
DE71	Germany	Darmstadt	81.9	79.7	83.9	4.2	0.2	82.1	80.1	84.0	3.9	−0.4	81.7	79.6	83.7	4.1	−0.2
DE26	Germany	Lower Franconia	81.9	79.5	84.3	4.8	0.2	82.1	80.0	84.3	4.3	−0.4	81.7	79.5	83.9	4.4	−0.2
DEB3	Germany	Rheinhessen-Pfalz	81.4	79.0	83.7	4.7	−0.1	81.3	79.2	83.4	4.2	0.1	81.4	79.1	83.6	4.5	0.0
DE25	Germany	Middle Franconia	81.2	78.7	83.7	5.0	0.1	81.3	79.0	83.4	4.4	0.0	81.3	79.0	83.6	4.6	0.1
DEA2	Germany	Cologne	81.2	79.0	83.3	4.3	0.1	81.3	79.2	83.4	4.2	−0.1	81.2	78.9	83.3	4.4	0.0
DE30	Germany	Berlin	80.9	78.3	83.5	5.2	0.6	81.5	79.1	83.9	4.8	−0.3	81.2	78.7	83.7	5.0	0.3
DED5	Germany	Leipzig	80.8	77.7	84.0	6.3	0.2	81.0	78.1	84.0	5.9	0.2	81.2	78.3	84.3	6.0	0.4
DEA4	Germany	Detmold	81.4	79.0	83.8	4.8	0.2	81.6	79.2	83.9	4.7	−0.5	81.1	78.7	83.5	4.8	−0.3
DEB2	Germany	Trier	81.2	78.7	83.7	5.0	0.5	81.7	79.6	83.7	4.1	−0.7	81.0	78.7	83.3	4.6	−0.2
DE22	Germany	Lower Bavaria	80.7	78.3	83.2	4.9	0.7	81.4	79.4	83.5	4.1	−0.4	81.0	78.6	83.4	4.8	0.3
DEB1	Germany	Koblenz	80.8	78.5	83.0	4.5	0.3	81.1	79.0	83.1	4.1	−0.2	80.9	78.6	83.2	4.6	0.1
DE60	Germany	Hamburg	81.2	78.7	83.5	4.8	0.3	81.5	79.2	83.8	4.6	−0.6	80.9	78.5	83.3	4.8	−0.3
DEF0	Germany	Schleswig-Holstein	80.8	78.5	83.1	4.6	0.1	80.9	78.6	83.3	4.7	−0.1	80.8	78.6	83.1	4.5	0.0
DE23	Germany	Upper Palatinate	80.9	78.5	83.4	4.9	0.4	81.3	79.1	83.4	4.3	−0.5	80.8	78.6	83.0	4.4	−0.1
DE72	Germany	Giessen	81.3	79.0	83.5	4.5	−0.3	81.0	78.8	83.2	4.4	−0.3	80.7	78.4	83.0	4.6	−0.6
DE24	Germany	Upper Franconia	81.0	78.5	83.4	4.9	0.2	81.2	78.7	83.6	4.9	−0.5	80.7	78.2	83.2	5.0	−0.3
DE40	Germany	Brandenburg	80.7	77.9	83.5	5.6	0.5	81.2	78.4	84.0	5.6	−0.5	80.7	77.8	83.7	5.9	0.0
DE93	Germany	Lüneburg	80.7	78.1	83.4	5.3	0.2	80.9	78.5	83.2	4.7	−0.3	80.6	78.2	83.0	4.8	−0.1
DEA3	Germany	Münster	80.9	78.4	83.3	4.9	0.2	81.1	78.7	83.4	4.7	−0.5	80.6	78.2	82.9	4.7	−0.3
DED4	Germany	Chemnitz	80.9	77.8	83.9	6.1	−0.1	80.8	77.8	83.9	6.1	−0.2	80.6	77.5	83.9	6.4	−0.3
DE73	Germany	Kassel	81.2	78.6	83.6	5.0	0.1	81.3	79.0	83.6	4.6	−0.8	80.5	78.0	83.1	5.1	−0.7
DEG0	Germany	Thuringia	80.6	77.6	83.6	6.0	0.1	80.7	78.0	83.5	5.5	−0.2	80.5	77.7	83.5	5.8	−0.1
DE94	Germany	Weser-Ems	80.8	78.5	83.1	4.6	0.2	81.0	78.6	83.4	4.8	−0.6	80.4	78.1	82.8	4.7	−0.4
DE92	Germany	Hanover	80.7	78.0	83.3	5.3	0.3	81.0	78.4	83.5	5.1	−0.6	80.4	78.0	82.8	4.8	−0.3
DE91	Germany	Braunschweig	80.7	78.2	83.1	4.9	−0.1	80.6	78.4	82.9	4.5	−0.4	80.2	77.9	82.6	4.7	−0.5
DEA1	Germany	Düsseldorf	80.5	78.1	82.8	4.7	0.2	80.7	78.4	82.9	4.5	−0.5	80.2	77.9	82.5	4.6	−0.3
DEC0	Germany	Saarland	80.2	77.7	82.6	4.9	0.0	80.2	77.9	82.5	4.6	−0.2	80.0	77.6	82.4	4.8	−0.2
DE80	Germany	Mecklenburg-Vorpommern	80.4	77.2	83.7	6.5	−0.1	80.3	77.3	83.5	6.2	−0.3	80.0	76.9	83.3	6.4	−0.4
DEA5	Germany	Arnsberg	80.2	77.6	82.7	5.1	0.2	80.4	78.0	82.7	4.7	−0.5	79.9	77.5	82.3	4.8	−0.3
DE50	Germany	Bremen	80.1	77.4	82.7	5.3	0.6	80.7	78.0	83.3	5.3	−1.0	79.7	77.0	82.4	5.4	−0.4
DEE0	Germany	Saxony-Anhalt	79.8	76.6	83.0	6.4	0.2	80.0	77.0	83.1	6.1	−0.8	79.2	76.1	82.4	6.3	−0.6
IS00	Iceland	Iceland	82.9	81.3	84.5	3.2	0.3	83.2	81.7	84.7	3.0	−0.8	82.4	80.7	84.3	3.6	−0.5
NL34	Netherlands	Zeeland	82.8	80.5	85.0	4.5	−0.2	82.6	80.8	84.4	3.6	−0.4	82.2	80.8	83.7	2.9	−0.6
NL22	Netherlands	Gelderland	81.9	80.1	83.6	3.5	0.2	82.1	80.7	83.3	2.6	0.0	82.1	80.7	83.4	2.7	0.2
NL32	Netherlands	North Holland	81.8	80.2	83.4	3.2	0.6	82.4	80.8	83.9	3.1	−0.3	82.1	80.5	83.6	3.1	0.3
NL23	Netherlands	Flevoland	82.3	80.6	84.0	3.4	0.1	82.4	80.9	83.9	3.0	−0.4	82.0	80.8	83.3	2.5	−0.3
NL12	Netherlands	Friesland	81.6	79.5	83.7	4.2	0.4	82.0	80.4	83.5	3.1	−0.1	81.9	80.4	83.4	3.0	0.3
NL41	Netherlands	North Brabant	81.7	79.9	83.4	3.5	0.6	82.3	80.6	83.9	3.3	−0.5	81.8	80.4	83.3	2.9	0.1
NL42	Netherlands	Limburg	81.6	79.8	83.2	3.4	0.2	81.8	80.1	83.5	3.4	0.0	81.8	80.3	83.2	2.9	0.2
NL21	Netherlands	Overijssel	81.6	79.8	83.3	3.5	0.3	81.9	80.4	83.4	3.0	−0.2	81.7	80.2	83.3	3.1	0.1
NL13	Netherlands	Drenthe	81.9	79.9	83.7	3.8	0.0	81.9	80.3	83.5	3.2	−0.3	81.6	80.1	83.1	3.0	−0.3
NL11	Netherlands	Groningen	80.7	78.8	82.5	3.7	0.6	81.3	79.4	83.1	3.7	−0.5	80.8	79.5	82.1	2.6	0.1
NL31	Netherlands	Utrecht	82.2	80.6	83.6	3.0	0.5	82.7	81.3	84.0	2.7	—	—	—	—	—	—
NL33	Netherlands	South Holland	82.0	80.2	83.6	3.4	0.2	82.2	80.6	83.7	3.1	—	—	—	—	—	—
DK04	Denmark	Central Denmark	81.2	79.1	83.3	4.2	0.8	82.0	80.1	84.0	3.9	0.2	82.2	80.3	84.1	3.8	1.0
DK01	Denmark	Capital Region	80.7	78.4	82.7	4.3	0.8	81.5	79.4	83.5	4.1	0.5	82.0	80.1	83.7	3.6	1.3
DK03	Denmark	Southern Denmark	80.8	78.9	82.7	3.8	0.7	81.5	79.4	83.6	4.2	0.1	81.6	79.6	83.6	4.0	0.8
DK05	Denmark	North Denmark Region	80.9	78.9	82.9	4.0	0.4	81.3	79.4	83.2	3.8	0.2	81.5	79.8	83.3	3.5	0.6
DK02	Denmark	Zealand	80.0	78.0	82.0	4.0	0.8	80.8	79.0	82.5	3.5	0.4	81.2	79.1	83.5	4.4	1.2
CZ01	Czech Republic	Prague	80.3	77.7	82.6	4.9	0.7	81.0	78.6	83.2	4.6	0.4	81.4	78.5	84.1	5.6	1.1
CZ06	Czech Republic	Southeast	79.7	76.4	82.9	6.5	0.2	79.9	76.8	82.9	6.1	0.7	80.6	77.7	83.5	5.8	0.9
CZ05	Czech Republic	Northeast	79.3	76.2	82.3	6.1	0.4	79.7	77.0	82.3	5.3	0.5	80.2	77.4	83.0	5.6	0.9
CZ03	Czech Republic	Southwest	79.1	76.1	82.0	5.9	0.4	79.5	76.6	82.4	5.8	0.6	80.1	77.4	82.9	5.5	1.0
CZ02	Czech Republic	Central Bohemia	79.0	76.1	81.9	5.8	0.4	79.4	76.6	82.2	5.6	0.5	79.9	76.9	82.8	5.9	0.9
CZ07	Czech Republic	Central Moravia	78.9	75.4	82.3	6.9	0.4	79.3	76.0	82.6	6.6	0.6	79.9	76.8	83.0	6.2	1.0
CZ08	Czech Republic	Moravian-Silesian	77.6	74.2	81.0	6.8	0.3	77.9	74.5	81.4	6.9	0.7	78.6	75.3	82.0	6.7	1.0
CZ04	Czech Republic	Northwest	77.0	74.1	80.0	5.9	0.7	77.7	74.8	80.5	5.7	0.4	78.1	75.0	81.1	6.1	1.1
SK01	Slovakia	Bratislava Region	78.7	75.6	81.5	5.9	0.6	79.3	76.2	82.0	5.8	1.1	80.4	77.4	83.1	5.7	1.7
SK02	Slovakia	Western Slovakia	76.9	73.3	80.5	7.2	1.1	78.0	74.7	81.3	6.6	0.3	78.3	75.0	81.5	6.5	1.4
SK04	Slovakia	Eastern Slovakia	76.6	73.0	80.1	7.1	1.0	77.6	74.1	80.9	6.8	0.2	77.8	74.3	81.3	7.0	1.2
SK03	Slovakia	Central Slovakia	76.8	72.8	80.6	7.8	0.4	77.2	73.3	81.1	7.8	0.4	77.6	74.1	81.1	7.0	0.8
PL82	Poland	Subcarpathian Voivodeship	79.0	75.0	83.0	8.0	0.4	79.4	75.4	83.4	8.0	0.4	79.8	75.9	83.7	7.8	0.8
PL21	Poland	Lesser Poland Voivodeship	79.1	75.3	82.7	7.4	0.1	79.2	75.4	82.9	7.5	0.5	79.7	76.1	83.2	7.1	0.6
PL91	Poland	Warsaw metropolitan area	79.3	75.5	82.7	7.2	0.2	79.5	75.8	82.9	7.1	0.1	79.6	76.2	82.7	6.5	0.3
PL84	Poland	Podlaskie Voivodeship	78.4	73.9	83.1	9.2	0.3	78.7	74.2	83.3	9.1	0.2	78.9	74.5	83.4	8.9	0.5
PL52	Poland	Opole Voivodeship	78.1	74.4	81.6	7.2	0.1	78.2	74.4	82.1	7.7	0.6	78.8	75.2	82.5	7.3	0.7
PL63	Poland	Pomeranian Voivodeship	78.2	74.4	82.0	7.6	0.3	78.5	74.9	82.0	7.1	0.2	78.7	75.2	82.2	7.0	0.5
PL81	Poland	Lublin Voivodeship	77.8	73.2	82.4	9.2	0.4	78.2	73.9	82.6	8.7	0.2	78.4	74.2	82.7	8.5	0.6
PL41	Poland	Greater Poland Voivodeship	77.8	74.0	81.5	7.5	0.3	78.1	74.4	81.7	7.3	0.2	78.3	74.8	81.8	7.0	0.5
PL51	Poland	Lower Silesian Voivodeship	77.4	73.1	81.5	8.4	0.1	77.5	73.5	81.5	8.0	0.6	78.1	74.3	81.9	7.6	0.7
PL72	Poland	Świętokrzyskie Voivodeship	77.9	73.6	82.2	8.6	0.1	78.0	73.8	82.4	8.6	0.0	78.0	73.7	82.5	8.8	0.1
PL43	Poland	Lubusz Voivodeship	77.4	73.3	81.3	8.0	−0.5	76.9	72.9	81.0	8.1	1.0	77.9	74.0	81.7	7.7	0.5
PL22	Poland	Silesian Voivodeship	77.0	73.3	80.6	7.3	0.5	77.5	74.0	81.0	7.0	0.3	77.8	74.3	81.3	7.0	0.8
PL42	Poland	West Pomeranian Voivodeship	77.6	73.6	81.4	7.8	−0.1	77.5	73.7	81.3	7.6	0.2	77.7	74.0	81.5	7.5	0.1
PL61	Poland	Kuyavian–Pomeranian Voivodeship	77.5	73.4	81.4	8.0	0.0	77.5	73.8	81.2	7.4	0.2	77.7	74.0	81.4	7.4	0.2
PL62	Poland	Warmian–Masurian Voivodeship	77.4	73.0	81.7	8.7	−0.2	77.2	72.9	81.4	8.5	0.5	77.7	73.7	81.7	8.0	0.3
PL92	Poland	Masovian Regional	76.8	72.4	81.4	9.0	0.2	77.0	72.7	81.7	9.0	0.3	77.3	73.2	81.7	8.5	0.5
PL71	Poland	Łódź Voivodeship	76.3	71.6	80.9	9.3	0.6	76.9	72.6	81.2	8.6	0.4	77.3	73.1	81.4	8.3	1.0
HR05	Croatia	City of Zagreb	—	—	—	—	—	—	—	—	—	—	79.6	76.7	82.0	5.3	—
HR03	Croatia	Adriatic Croatia	79.3	76.3	82.3	6.0	0.6	79.9	76.9	82.8	5.9	−0.5	79.4	76.4	82.4	6.0	0.1
HR06	Croatia	Northern Croatia	—	—	—	—	—	—	—	—	—	—	78.2	74.6	81.9	7.3	—
HR02	Croatia	Pannonian Croatia	—	—	—	—	—	—	—	—	—	—	77.4	74.1	80.7	6.6	—
HR04	Croatia	Continental Croatia	77.2	73.9	80.5	6.6	0.7	77.9	74.7	81.1	6.4	—	—	—	—	—	—
EE00	Estonia	Estonia	77.4	72.4	81.9	9.5	1.6	79.0	74.5	83.0	8.5	0.1	79.1	74.5	83.3	8.8	1.7
HU11	Hungary	Budapest	78.3	75.1	81.0	5.9	0.4	78.7	75.8	81.1	5.3	0.1	78.8	75.9	81.3	5.4	0.5
HU12	Hungary	Pest County	76.2	72.7	79.5	6.8	0.7	76.9	73.8	79.8	6.0	0.5	77.4	74.5	80.1	5.6	1.2
HU22	Hungary	Western Transdanubia	76.1	72.7	79.5	6.8	1.2	77.3	73.8	80.6	6.8	0.1	77.4	74.2	80.5	6.3	1.3
HU21	Hungary	Central Transdanubia	75.8	72.3	79.2	6.9	0.4	76.2	72.6	79.8	7.2	0.5	76.7	73.4	80.0	6.6	0.9
HU23	Hungary	Southern Transdanubia	75.5	71.9	79.0	7.1	0.5	76.0	72.5	79.4	6.9	0.7	76.7	73.2	80.1	6.9	1.2
HU33	Hungary	Southern Great Plain	75.5	71.8	79.1	7.3	0.7	76.2	72.8	79.5	6.7	0.0	76.2	72.9	79.5	6.6	0.7
HU32	Hungary	Northern Great Plain	75.3	71.3	79.0	7.7	0.2	75.5	71.8	79.1	7.3	0.2	75.7	72.3	79.2	6.9	0.4
HU31	Hungary	Northern Hungary	74.4	70.5	78.2	7.7	0.1	74.5	70.7	78.4	7.7	0.4	74.9	71.4	78.4	7.0	0.5
LT01	Lithuania	Vilnius County	74.8	69.1	80.0	10.9	2.1	76.9	71.8	81.4	9.6	1.5	78.4	73.6	82.6	9.0	3.6
LT02	Lithuania	Central and Western Lithuania Region	74.7	69.1	80.1	11.0	1.7	76.4	71.4	81.1	9.7	0.9	77.3	72.6	81.6	9.0	2.6
ME00	Montenegro	Montenegro	76.5	74.1	78.9	4.8	0.2	76.7	74.0	79.5	5.5	0.9	77.6	75.1	80.2	5.1	1.1
RO32	Romania	București - Ilfov	76.7	73.2	80.0	6.8	0.5	77.2	73.6	80.5	6.9	0.4	77.6	74.0	80.9	6.9	0.9
RO41	Romania	South-West	74.8	71.5	78.3	6.8	1.4	76.2	72.8	79.9	7.1	0.8	77.0	73.4	80.8	7.4	2.2
RO12	Romania	Centru	75.5	72.1	78.9	6.8	0.5	76.0	72.5	79.7	7.2	1.0	77.0	73.4	80.6	7.2	1.5
RO11	Romania	North West	74.8	71.3	78.5	7.2	0.9	75.7	72.1	79.4	7.3	0.9	76.6	73.1	80.2	7.1	1.8
RO42	Romania	West	74.6	71.4	77.9	6.5	1.0	75.6	72.3	79.0	6.7	0.9	76.5	73.3	79.6	6.3	1.9
RO31	Romania	South - Muntenia	75.0	71.3	78.8	7.5	0.5	75.5	71.8	79.4	7.6	0.6	76.1	72.2	80.4	8.2	1.1
RO22	Romania	South East	74.2	70.3	78.4	8.1	0.2	74.4	70.1	79.1	9.0	1.3	75.7	71.5	80.2	8.7	1.5
RO21	Romania	North East	74.3	70.4	78.6	8.2	0.3	74.6	70.7	79.1	8.4	0.9	75.5	71.4	80.2	8.8	1.2
TR90	Turkey	Trabzon region	79.7	76.1	83.3	7.2	1.0	80.7	77.5	83.8	6.3	−3.2	77.5	75.6	79.6	4.0	−2.2
TRA1	Turkey	Erzurum region	78.0	75.5	80.5	5.0	1.1	79.1	76.9	81.4	4.5	−1.9	77.2	75.5	78.9	3.4	−0.8
TR51	Turkey	Ankara	79.4	76.8	82.0	5.2	0.5	79.9	77.2	82.5	5.3	−2.7	77.2	75.4	79.1	3.7	−2.2
TR10	Turkey	Istanbul	78.5	75.5	81.3	5.8	1.1	79.6	76.9	82.2	5.3	−2.5	77.1	75.2	79.0	3.8	−1.4
TR61	Turkey	Antalya region	79.3	76.7	81.9	5.2	0.6	79.9	77.4	82.5	5.1	−2.8	77.1	75.1	79.0	3.9	−2.2
TRC3	Turkey	Mardin region	—	—	—	—	—	80.1	77.4	82.7	5.3	−3.1	77.0	75.3	78.6	3.3	—
TR82	Turkey	Kastamonu region	78.0	75.2	80.9	5.7	1.2	79.2	76.3	82.3	6.0	−2.2	77.0	75.2	78.9	3.7	−1.0
TR32	Turkey	Aydın region	79.5	76.7	82.4	5.7	0.0	79.5	76.9	82.3	5.4	−2.5	77.0	74.9	79.2	4.3	−2.5
TRA2	Turkey	Ağrı region	76.7	74.4	79.2	4.8	1.9	78.6	75.9	81.6	5.7	−1.7	76.9	75.2	78.6	3.4	0.2
TR42	Turkey	Kocaeli region	78.0	75.5	80.7	5.2	0.8	78.8	76.3	81.4	5.1	−2.0	76.8	74.9	78.8	3.9	−1.2
TR83	Turkey	Samsun region	77.9	75.2	80.7	5.5	1.2	79.1	76.4	82.0	5.6	−2.3	76.8	74.8	78.8	4.0	−1.1
TR72	Turkey	Kayseri region	77.9	75.4	80.5	5.1	1.2	79.1	76.7	81.6	4.9	−2.4	76.7	74.8	78.6	3.8	−1.2
TR41	Turkey	Bursa region	77.6	75.1	80.1	5.0	1.2	78.8	76.3	81.3	5.0	−2.2	76.6	74.7	78.6	3.9	−1.0
TR52	Turkey	Konya region	78.1	75.6	80.6	5.0	1.1	79.2	76.6	81.8	5.2	−2.6	76.6	74.6	78.6	4.0	−1.5
TR71	Turkey	Kırıkkale region	77.7	75.0	80.4	5.4	1.0	78.7	76.1	81.2	5.1	−2.1	76.6	74.6	78.6	4.0	−1.1
TR31	Turkey	İzmir	78.7	75.7	81.8	6.1	0.5	79.2	76.4	82.0	5.6	−2.6	76.6	74.3	78.9	4.6	−2.1
TR81	Turkey	Zonguldak region	78.0	75.2	80.8	5.6	1.1	79.1	76.7	81.5	4.8	−2.6	76.5	74.6	78.6	4.0	−1.5
TR22	Turkey	Balıkesir region	77.8	74.9	80.8	5.9	0.7	78.5	75.6	81.5	5.9	−2.1	76.4	74.0	78.8	4.8	−1.4
TRB2	Turkey	Van region	76.9	74.2	79.6	5.4	1.7	78.6	76.3	80.9	4.6	−2.3	76.3	74.9	77.8	2.9	−0.6
TR33	Turkey	Manisa region	77.1	74.4	79.8	5.4	0.8	77.9	75.2	80.7	5.5	−1.8	76.1	74.1	78.2	4.1	−1.0
TR21	Turkey	Tekirdağ region	77.3	74.4	80.4	6.0	1.1	78.4	75.6	81.4	5.8	−2.4	76.0	73.9	78.3	4.4	−1.3
TRB1	Turkey	Malatya region	78.8	76.2	81.4	5.2	1.2	80.0	77.4	82.7	5.3	−4.6	75.4	73.9	76.9	3.0	−3.4
TR62	Turkey	Adana region	77.9	75.1	80.7	5.6	0.7	78.6	76.0	81.3	5.3	−3.3	75.3	73.2	77.4	4.2	−2.6
TRC2	Turkey	Şanlıurfa region	77.9	74.7	81.1	6.4	0.8	78.7	75.6	81.7	6.1	−3.5	75.2	73.4	77.0	3.6	−2.7
TRC1	Turkey	Gaziantep region	77.4	74.7	80.1	5.4	0.4	77.8	75.2	80.3	5.1	−12.6	65.2	64.3	66.0	1.7	−12.2
TR63	Turkey	Hatay region	78.3	76.1	80.6	4.5	0.7	79.0	77.0	81.0	4.0	−23.6	55.4	55.4	55.5	0.1	−22.9
RS11	Serbia	Belgrade region	—	—	—	—	—	77.2	74.7	79.5	4.8	0.0	77.2	74.6	79.6	5.0	—
RS21	Serbia	Šumadija and Western Serbia	—	—	—	—	—	76.2	73.7	78.9	5.2	0.3	76.5	74.3	78.7	4.4	—
RS22	Serbia	Southern and Eastern Serbia	—	—	—	—	—	75.5	73.1	78.0	4.9	0.1	75.6	73.2	78.2	5.0	—
RS12	Serbia	Vojvodina	—	—	—	—	—	75.2	72.3	78.2	5.9	0.3	75.5	72.9	78.1	5.2	—
BG41	Bulgaria	Southwest Region	75.3	71.9	78.7	6.8	0.7	76.0	72.5	79.6	7.1	0.9	76.9	73.1	80.7	7.6	1.6
BG42	Bulgaria	South-Central Region	75.1	71.6	78.7	7.1	0.5	75.6	72.0	79.4	7.4	0.6	76.2	72.4	80.1	7.7	1.1
BG33	Bulgaria	Northeast Region	74.4	70.9	78.0	7.1	0.6	75.0	71.5	78.6	7.1	0.5	75.5	72.1	79.0	6.9	1.1
BG32	Bulgaria	North-Central Region	74.0	70.7	77.4	6.7	0.6	74.6	71.2	78.2	7.0	0.6	75.2	71.2	79.3	8.1	1.2
BG34	Bulgaria	Southeast Region	74.0	70.6	77.5	6.9	0.5	74.5	70.9	78.3	7.4	0.6	75.1	71.3	79.0	7.7	1.1
BG31	Bulgaria	Northwest Region	73.0	69.6	76.7	7.1	0.7	73.7	70.4	77.5	7.1	0.2	73.9	70.0	78.2	8.2	0.9
LV00	Latvia	Latvia	74.5	69.1	79.4	10.3	1.2	75.7	70.9	80.1	9.2	−0.1	75.6	70.5	80.6	10.1	1.1
AL02	Albania	Central Albania	—	—	—	—	—	81.6	80.0	83.4	3.4	—	—	—	—	—	—
AL01	Albania	Northern Albania	—	—	—	—	—	78.7	77.3	80.2	2.9	—	—	—	—	—	—
AL03	Albania	Southern Albania	—	—	—	—	—	77.4	76.0	78.9	2.9	—	—	—	—	—	—
MK00	North Macedonia	North Macedonia	75.5	73.5	77.5	4.0	1.1	76.6	74.7	78.6	3.9	—	—	—	—	—	—
UKI3	UK	Inner London - West	84.0	82.0	85.9	3.9	—	—	—	—	—	—	—	—	—	—	—
UKI7	UK	Outer London - West and North West	83.4	81.6	85.2	3.6	—	—	—	—	—	—	—	—	—	—	—
UKJ2	UK	Surrey, East and West Sussex	82.9	81.2	84.5	3.3	—	—	—	—	—	—	—	—	—	—	—
UKK2	UK	Dorset and Somerset	82.9	81.0	84.8	3.8	—	—	—	—	—	—	—	—	—	—	—
UKJ1	UK	Berkshire, Buckinghamshire, and Oxfordshire	82.8	81.0	84.6	3.6	—	—	—	—	—	—	—	—	—	—	—
UKI6	UK	Outer London - South	82.6	81.2	84.0	2.8	—	—	—	—	—	—	—	—	—	—	—
UKE2	UK	North Yorkshire	82.6	80.9	84.2	3.3	—	—	—	—	—	—	—	—	—	—	—
UKJ3	UK	Hampshire and Isle of Wight	82.6	80.7	84.4	3.7	—	—	—	—	—	—	—	—	—	—	—
UKH2	UK	Bedfordshire and Hertfordshire	82.5	80.9	84.1	3.2	—	—	—	—	—	—	—	—	—	—	—
UKK1	UK	Gloucestershire, Wiltshire and Bristol/Bath area	82.5	80.7	84.2	3.5	—	—	—	—	—	—	—	—	—	—	—
UKH1	UK	East Anglia	82.5	80.6	84.2	3.6	—	—	—	—	—	—	—	—	—	—	—
UKK4	UK	Devon	82.2	80.2	84.1	3.9	—	—	—	—	—	—	—	—	—	—	—
UKI5	UK	Outer London - East and North East	82.2	80.1	84.1	4.0	—	—	—	—	—	—	—	—	—	—	—
UKG1	UK	Herefordshire, Worcestershire and Warwickshire	82.1	80.4	83.8	3.4	—	—	—	—	—	—	—	—	—	—	—
UKF3	UK	Lincolnshire	82.0	80.4	83.5	3.1	—	—	—	—	—	—	—	—	—	—	—
UKH3	UK	Essex	81.9	80.2	83.5	3.3	—	—	—	—	—	—	—	—	—	—	—
UKF2	UK	Leicestershire, Rutland and Northamptonshire	81.8	79.9	83.7	3.8	—	—	—	—	—	—	—	—	—	—	—
UKJ4	UK	Kent	81.7	80.0	83.3	3.3	—	—	—	—	—	—	—	—	—	—	—
UKD6	UK	Cheshire	81.7	79.9	83.3	3.4	—	—	—	—	—	—	—	—	—	—	—
UKK3	UK	Cornwall and Isles of Scilly	81.7	79.7	83.7	4.0	—	—	—	—	—	—	—	—	—	—	—
UKG2	UK	Shropshire and Staffordshire	81.4	79.6	83.3	3.7	—	—	—	—	—	—	—	—	—	—	—
UKL2	UK	East Wales	81.4	79.5	83.2	3.7	—	—	—	—	—	—	—	—	—	—	—
UKI4	UK	Inner London - East	81.4	79.2	83.6	4.4	—	—	—	—	—	—	—	—	—	—	—
UKD1	UK	Cumbria	81.3	79.1	83.5	4.4	—	—	—	—	—	—	—	—	—	—	—
UKM6	UK	Highlands and Islands	81.0	78.9	83.1	4.2	—	—	—	—	—	—	—	—	—	—	—
UKF1	UK	Derbyshire and Nottinghamshire	80.9	79.0	82.8	3.8	—	—	—	—	—	—	—	—	—	—	—
UKE1	UK	East Riding and North Lincolnshire	80.8	78.9	82.7	3.8	—	—	—	—	—	—	—	—	—	—	—
UKN0	UK	Northern Ireland	80.8	78.9	82.6	3.7	—	—	—	—	—	—	—	—	—	—	—
UKL1	UK	West Wales and the Valleys	80.6	78.6	82.4	3.8	—	—	—	—	—	—	—	—	—	—	—
UKE3	UK	South Yorkshire	80.4	78.6	82.3	3.7	—	—	—	—	—	—	—	—	—	—	—
UKE4	UK	West Yorkshire	80.4	78.4	82.3	3.9	—	—	—	—	—	—	—	—	—	—	—
UKD4	UK	Lancashire	80.1	78.1	82.0	3.9	—	—	—	—	—	—	—	—	—	—	—
UKG3	UK	West Midlands	80.1	77.8	82.3	4.5	—	—	—	—	—	—	—	—	—	—	—
UKM5	UK	North Eastern Scotland	80.0	78.1	81.8	3.7	—	—	—	—	—	—	—	—	—	—	—
UKC2	UK	Northumberland and Tyne and Wear	79.9	77.8	82.0	4.2	—	—	—	—	—	—	—	—	—	—	—
UKD3	UK	Greater Manchester	79.7	77.8	81.6	3.8	—	—	—	—	—	—	—	—	—	—	—
UKD7	UK	Merseyside	79.7	77.7	81.6	3.9	—	—	—	—	—	—	—	—	—	—	—
UKC1	UK	Tees Valley and Durham	79.6	77.7	81.4	3.7	—	—	—	—	—	—	—	—	—	—	—

=== Maps ===
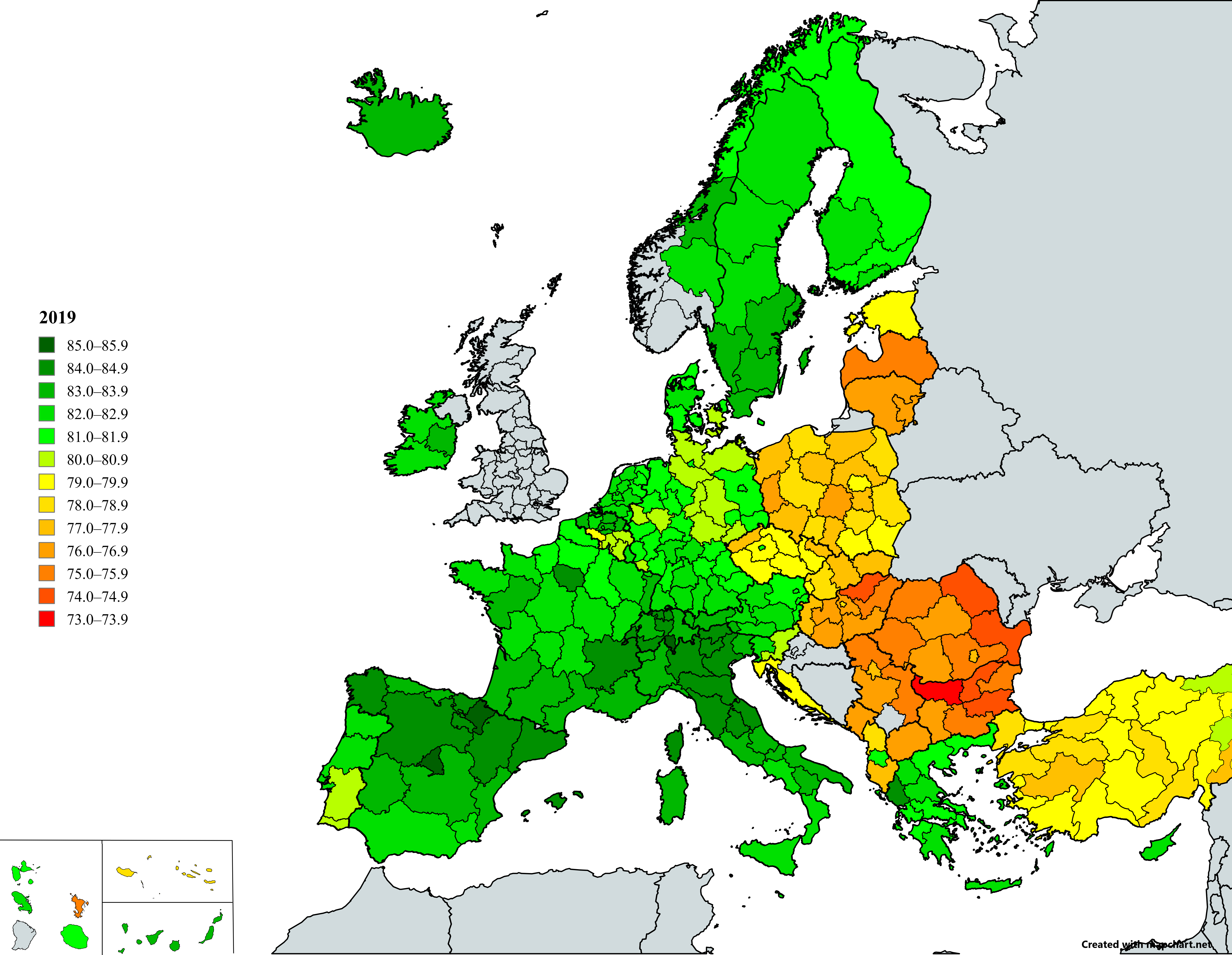
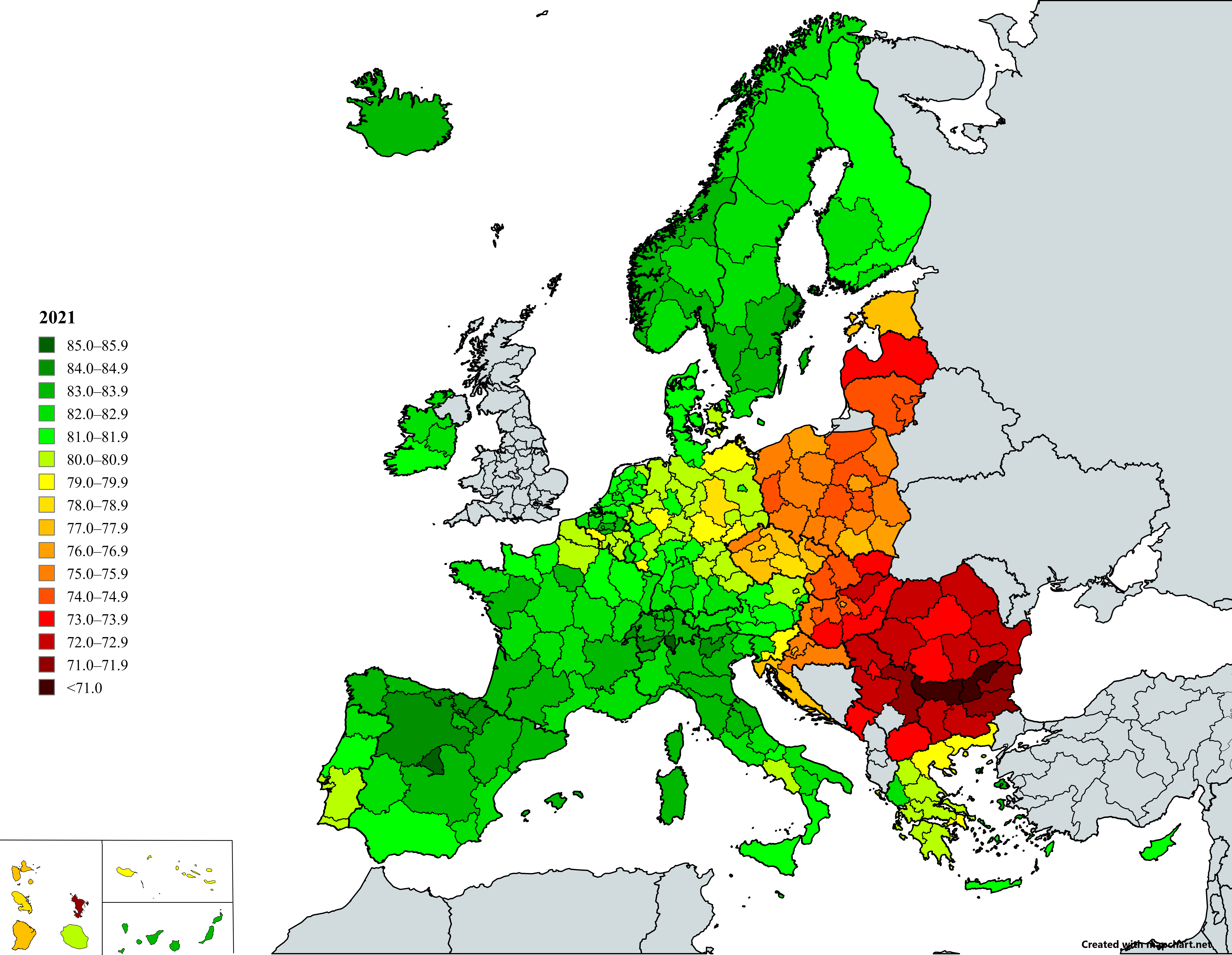
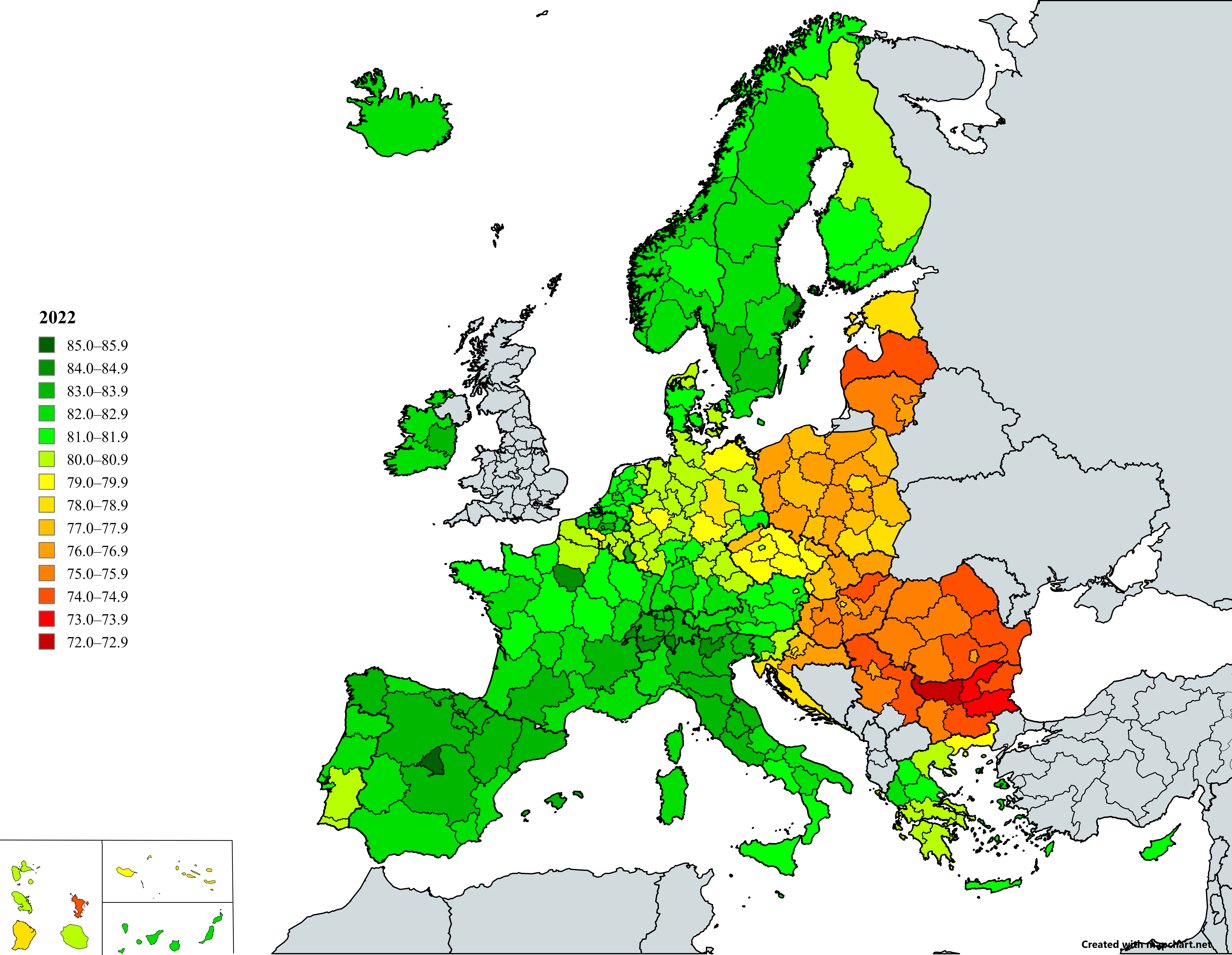
Life expectancy in European regions in 2019, 2021, 2022, according to Eurostat
(legends on the maps are identical)
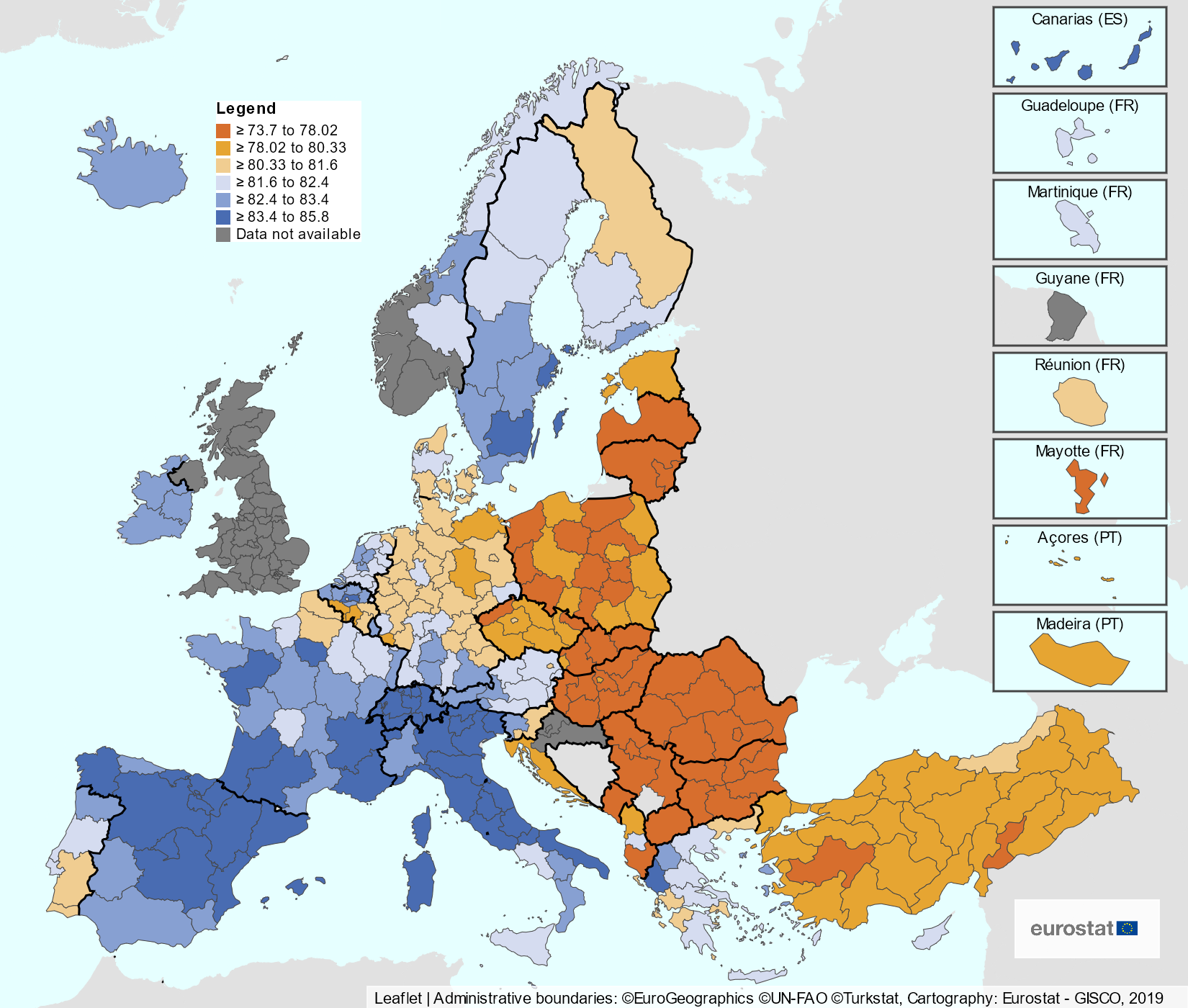
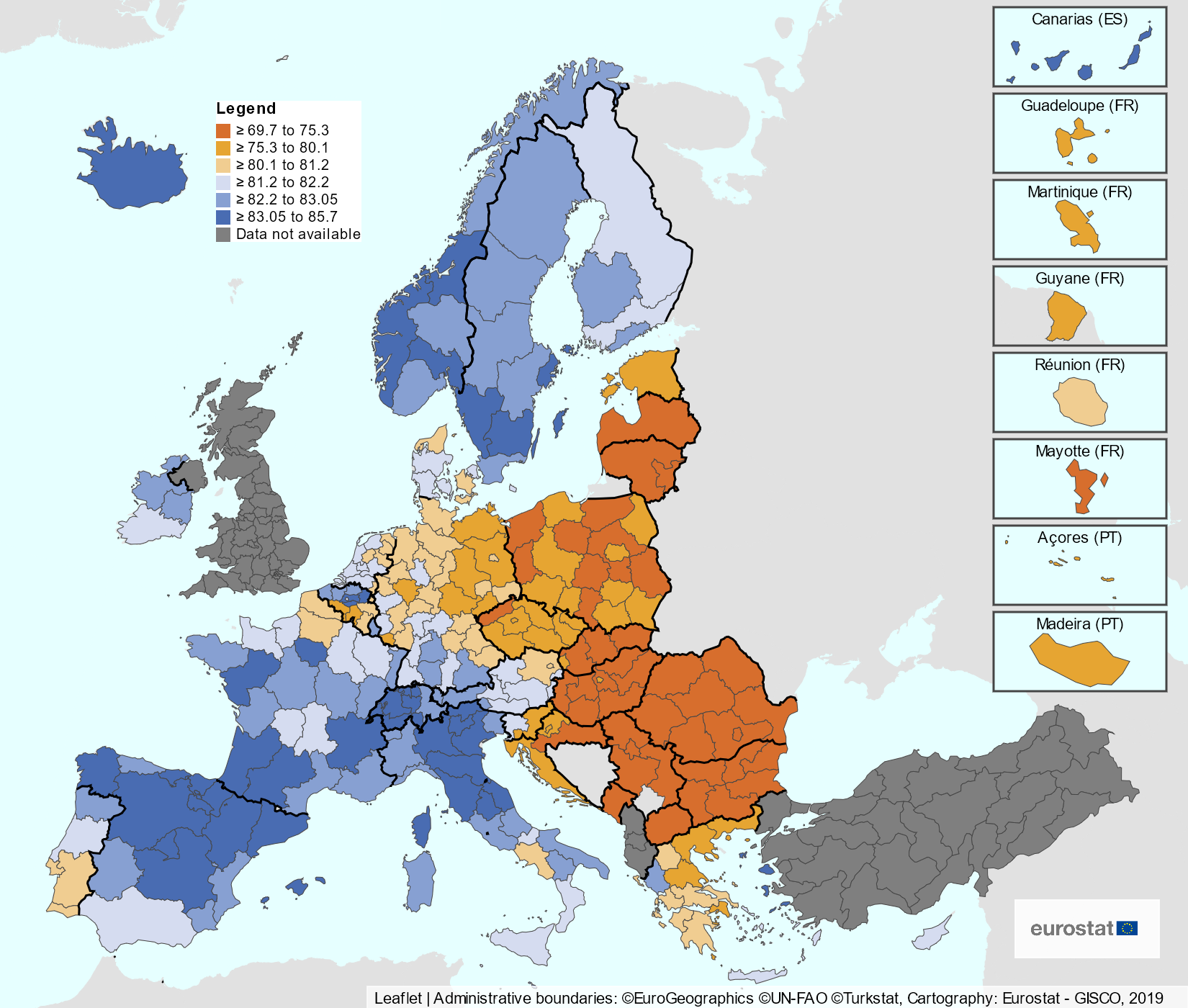
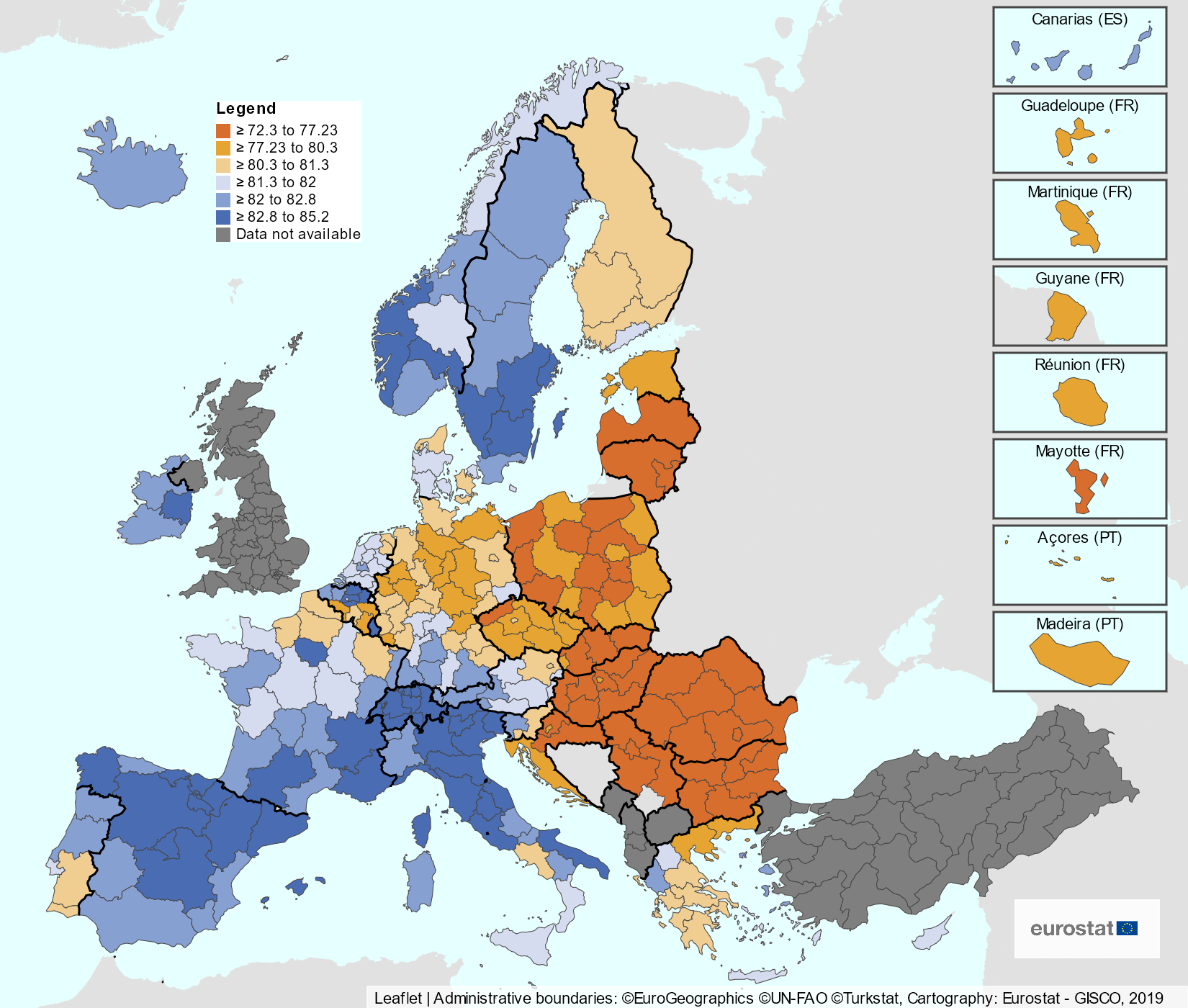
Alternative visualization of the data
(legends on the maps are various)
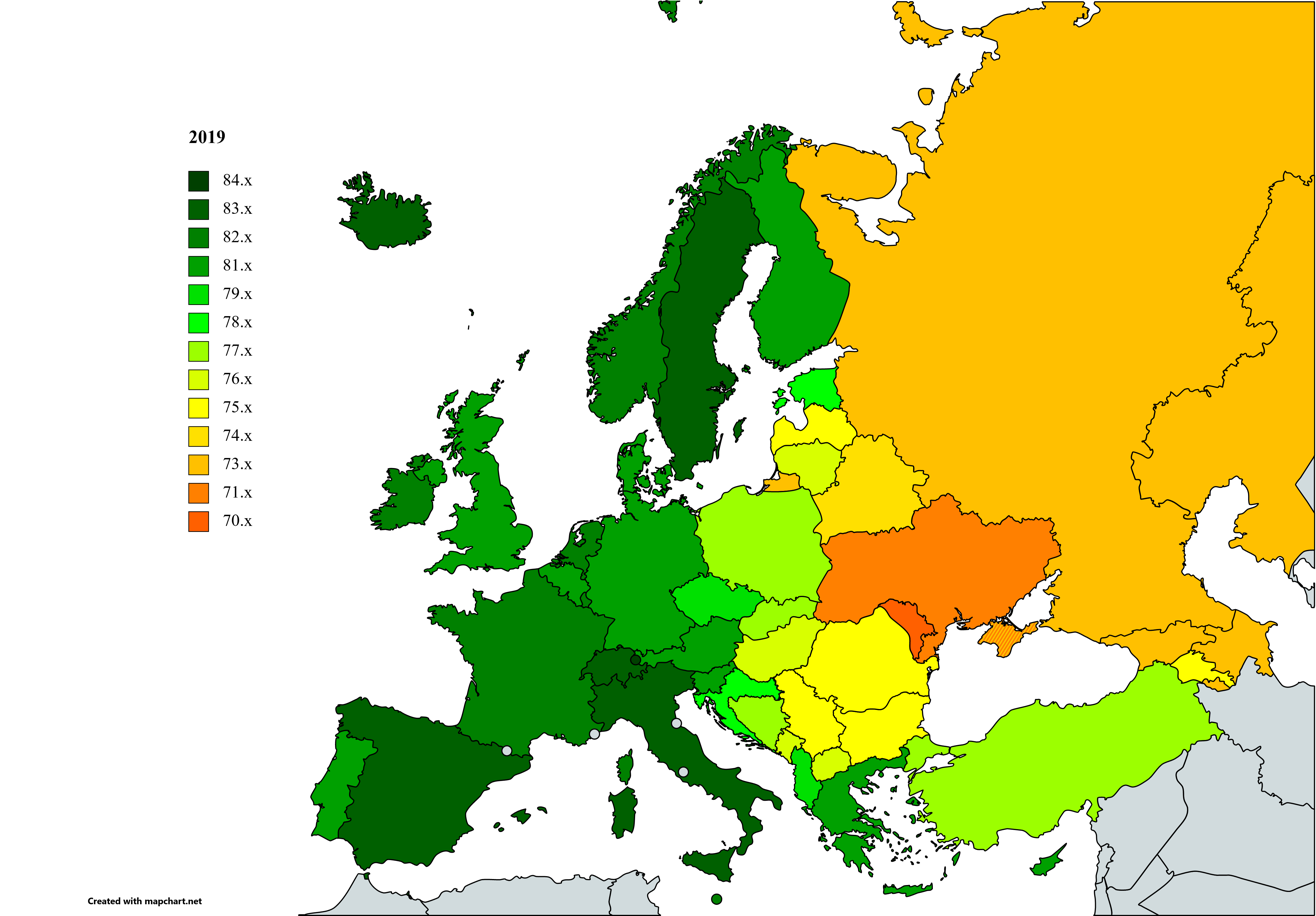
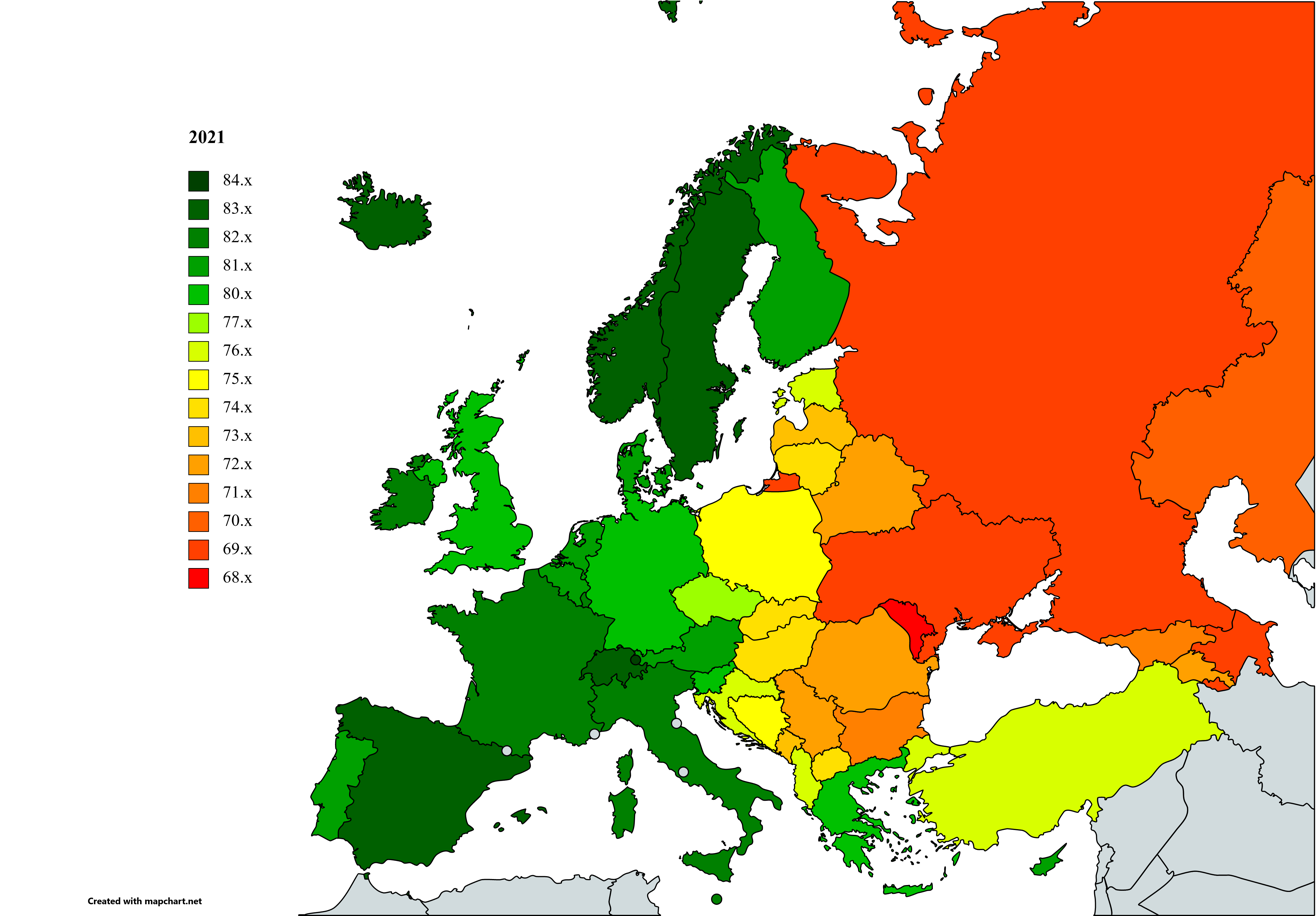
Life expectancy for European countries in 2019 and 2021, according to the World Bank Group
(legends on the maps are identical)

== Estimate of the Global Data Lab (2019—2022) ==
This is a list of European regions according to estimation of the Global Data Lab, as of 12 October 2024. The data is filtered according to the list of countries in Europe. By default, regions within country are sorted by overall life expectancy in 2022. Countries are sorted by the most favorable for life expectancy region inside them.

country or special territory	region	2019				2019 →2021	2021	2021 →2022	2022				2019 →2022
country or special territory	region	overall	male	female	F Δ M	2019 →2021	overall	2021 →2022	overall	male	female	F Δ M	2019 →2022
Spain	Madrid	85.34	82.66	87.65	4.99	−0.31	85.03	0.85	85.88	83.10	88.33	5.23	0.54
Spain	Navarre	84.55	82.06	86.96	4.90	−0.12	84.43	0.14	84.57	81.68	87.52	5.84	0.02
Spain	Castile and León	84.25	81.47	87.06	5.59	−0.32	83.93	0.54	84.47	81.68	87.32	5.64	0.22
Spain	Catalonia	83.85	80.97	86.56	5.59	−0.51	83.34	1.03	84.37	81.58	87.02	5.44	0.52
Spain	Basque Country	84.05	81.07	86.96	5.89	−0.42	83.63	0.64	84.27	81.48	87.02	5.54	0.22
Spain	Castilla–La Mancha	83.45	81.17	85.96	4.79	−0.51	82.94	1.13	84.07	81.68	86.61	4.93	0.62
Spain	Galicia	83.55	80.67	86.46	5.79	−0.02	83.53	0.54	84.07	81.18	86.82	5.64	0.52
Spain	Balearic Islands (in the Mediterranean Sea)	83.75	81.37	86.06	4.69	−0.41	83.34	0.53	83.87	81.18	86.51	5.33	0.12
Spain	La Rioja	83.75	80.97	86.56	5.59	−0.81	82.94	0.93	83.87	81.08	86.71	5.63	0.12
Spain	Cantabria	83.45	80.77	86.16	5.39	0.18	83.63	0.14	83.77	81.08	86.21	5.13	0.32
Spain	Aragon	83.95	81.17	86.66	5.49	−0.81	83.14	0.53	83.67	80.88	86.51	5.63	−0.28
Spain	Valencia	83.06	80.37	85.76	5.39	−0.92	82.14	1.12	83.26	80.68	85.91	5.23	0.20
Spain	Extremadura	82.66	79.87	85.66	5.79	−0.72	81.94	1.22	83.16	80.47	85.81	5.34	0.50
Spain	Asturias	82.76	79.77	85.66	5.89	−0.12	82.64	0.52	83.16	80.37	85.81	5.44	0.40
Spain	Canary Islands (in the Atlantic Ocean)	83.06	80.57	85.66	5.09	−0.22	82.84	0.12	82.96	80.47	85.51	5.04	−0.10
Spain	Murcia	82.46	79.97	84.87	4.90	−0.52	81.94	0.82	82.76	80.07	85.51	5.44	0.30
Spain	Andalusia	82.16	79.47	84.77	5.30	−0.82	81.34	1.32	82.66	79.97	85.30	5.33	0.50
Spain	Melilla (autonomous city in Africa)	80.97	78.48	83.58	5.10	−1.22	79.75	2.61	82.36	80.37	84.40	4.03	1.39
Spain	Ceuta (autonomous city in Africa)	80.97	78.68	83.38	4.70	−2.21	78.76	2.29	81.05	79.26	82.79	3.53	0.08
Switzerland	Ticino	84.73	82.71	86.58	3.87	1.85	86.58	−0.84	85.74	83.76	87.52	3.76	1.01
Switzerland	Lake Geneva region	84.33	82.12	86.28	4.16	1.34	85.67	−0.54	85.13	83.45	86.61	3.16	0.80
Switzerland	Zurich	83.73	82.02	85.38	3.36	0.93	84.66	0.37	85.03	83.66	86.21	2.55	1.30
Switzerland	Northwestern Switzerland	83.73	82.02	85.38	3.36	0.93	84.66	0.37	85.03	83.45	86.41	2.96	1.30
Switzerland	Central Switzerland	84.13	82.42	85.88	3.46	0.63	84.76	0.17	84.93	83.45	86.41	2.96	0.80
Switzerland	Espace Mittelland	83.33	81.52	85.09	3.57	1.02	84.35	−0.03	84.32	82.64	85.81	3.17	0.99
Switzerland	Eastern Switzerland	83.33	81.32	85.19	3.87	0.52	83.85	0.47	84.32	82.54	86.01	3.47	0.99
Italy	Trento (Trentino)	84.85	82.40	87.09	4.69	−0.54	84.31	1.38	85.69	83.59	87.62	4.03	0.84
Italy	South Tyrol (Bolzano)	84.45	82.20	86.59	4.39	−0.54	83.91	1.07	84.98	82.78	87.01	4.23	0.53
Italy	Umbria	84.45	82.30	86.39	4.09	−0.94	83.51	1.27	84.78	82.68	86.81	4.13	0.33
Italy	Veneto	84.25	82.00	86.29	4.29	−0.54	83.71	1.07	84.78	82.68	86.81	4.13	0.53
Italy	Emilia-Romagna	83.95	81.90	85.80	3.90	−0.64	83.31	1.37	84.68	82.88	86.30	3.42	0.73
Italy	Tuscany	84.05	82.00	85.99	3.99	−0.54	83.51	1.17	84.68	82.68	86.50	3.82	0.63
Italy	Lombardy	84.15	81.90	86.29	4.39	−0.44	83.71	0.97	84.68	82.58	86.70	4.12	0.53
Italy	Marche	84.35	82.30	86.29	3.99	−1.04	83.31	1.37	84.68	82.58	86.60	4.02	0.33
Italy	Lazio	83.75	81.60	85.70	4.10	−0.74	83.01	1.47	84.48	82.27	86.40	4.13	0.73
Italy	Friuli-Venezia Giulia	83.85	81.60	85.90	4.30	−1.24	82.61	1.76	84.37	82.17	86.50	4.33	0.52
Italy	Apulia	83.65	81.60	85.60	4.00	−1.34	82.31	1.76	84.07	81.97	85.89	3.92	0.42
Italy	Liguria	83.45	81.10	85.60	4.50	−0.34	83.11	0.96	84.07	81.87	85.99	4.12	0.62
Italy	Piedmont	83.25	81.00	85.40	4.40	−0.34	82.91	0.96	83.87	81.77	85.89	4.12	0.62
Italy	Abruzzo	83.65	81.40	85.70	4.30	−0.74	82.91	0.96	83.87	81.56	86.20	4.64	0.22
Italy	Aosta Valley	83.55	80.70	86.39	5.69	−0.44	83.11	0.55	83.66	81.97	85.28	3.31	0.11
Italy	Molise	83.55	80.90	86.19	5.29	−1.84	81.71	1.75	83.46	81.16	85.69	4.53	−0.09
Italy	Basilicata	82.95	80.70	85.10	4.40	−0.14	82.81	0.65	83.46	81.16	85.69	4.53	0.51
Italy	Sardinia	83.55	80.70	86.29	5.59	−0.44	83.11	0.25	83.36	80.95	85.69	4.74	−0.19
Italy	Calabria	82.75	80.50	84.90	4.40	−0.94	81.81	1.24	83.05	80.95	84.98	4.03	0.30
Italy	Sicily	82.25	80.20	84.20	4.00	−0.84	81.41	1.34	82.75	80.75	84.57	3.82	0.50
Italy	Campania	82.05	79.90	84.10	4.20	−1.04	81.01	1.33	82.34	80.34	84.27	3.93	0.29
France	Île-de-France (Paris Region)	84.21	81.46	86.68	5.22	−0.41	83.80	1.11	84.91	82.29	87.31	5.02	0.70
France	Rhône-Alpes	83.71	80.87	86.38	5.51	0.09	83.80	0.71	84.51	81.68	87.11	5.43	0.80
France	Midi-Pyrénées	83.41	80.67	85.98	5.31	0.09	83.50	0.30	83.80	81.27	86.40	5.13	0.39
France	Corsica (in the Mediterranean Sea)	83.61	81.17	86.08	4.91	−0.21	83.40	0.30	83.70	81.07	86.20	5.13	0.09
France	Provence-Alpes-Côte d'Azur	83.01	80.17	85.78	5.61	−0.61	82.40	1.20	83.60	80.77	86.20	5.43	0.59
France	Pays de la Loire	83.01	79.77	86.18	6.41	0.09	83.10	0.40	83.50	80.36	86.40	6.04	0.49
France	Aquitaine	83.01	79.97	85.88	5.91	0.09	83.10	0.30	83.40	80.77	85.90	5.13	0.39
France	Alsace	82.91	80.17	85.49	5.32	−0.01	82.90	0.19	83.09	80.57	85.49	4.92	0.18
France	Franche-Comté	82.42	79.37	85.49	6.12	−0.02	82.40	0.49	82.89	80.06	85.70	5.64	0.47
France	Languedoc-Roussillon	82.72	79.77	85.59	5.82	−0.42	82.30	0.59	82.89	79.96	85.70	5.74	0.17
France	Auvergne	82.12	78.97	85.29	6.32	−0.02	82.10	0.69	82.79	79.76	85.70	5.94	0.67
France	Limousin	81.92	78.58	85.29	6.71	0.18	82.10	0.69	82.79	79.76	85.70	5.94	0.87
France	Centre-Val de Loire (Centre Region)	82.32	79.27	85.29	6.02	−0.12	82.20	0.49	82.69	79.86	85.59	5.73	0.37
France	Brittany	82.12	78.68	85.49	6.81	0.28	82.40	0.29	82.69	79.56	85.80	6.24	0.57
France	Poitou-Charentes	82.42	79.27	85.49	6.22	−0.12	82.30	0.39	82.69	79.35	85.90	6.55	0.27
France	Burgundy	82.02	78.97	85.19	6.22	0.28	82.30	0.19	82.49	79.46	85.49	6.03	0.47
France	Champagne-Ardenne	81.42	78.08	84.69	6.61	−0.22	81.20	0.99	82.19	79.05	85.29	6.24	0.77
France	Lower Normandy	82.12	78.68	85.39	6.71	−0.42	81.70	0.38	82.08	78.95	85.29	6.34	−0.04
France	Lorraine	81.62	78.68	84.49	5.81	−0.32	81.30	0.68	81.98	79.25	84.69	5.44	0.36
France	Upper Normandy	81.42	78.18	84.59	6.41	−0.02	81.40	0.38	81.78	78.75	84.69	5.94	0.36
France	Picardy	81.02	77.98	84.09	6.11	−0.32	80.70	0.98	81.68	78.65	84.59	5.94	0.66
France	Nord-Pas-de-Calais	80.72	77.28	83.99	6.71	−0.32	80.40	0.88	81.28	77.94	84.49	6.55	0.56
France	Guadeloupe (in the Caribbean)	81.42	77.48	85.09	7.61	−3.82	77.60	3.37	80.97	76.93	84.69	7.76	−0.45
France	Martinique (in the Caribbean)	81.72	78.38	84.79	6.41	−3.52	78.20	2.57	80.77	77.84	83.48	5.64	−0.95
France	Réunion (in the Indian Ocean)	80.92	77.18	84.59	7.41	−0.02	80.90	−0.13	80.77	77.64	83.78	6.14	−0.15
France	French Guiana (in South America)	78.14	75.04	81.36	6.32	−0.94	77.20	2.16	79.36	76.12	82.67	6.55	1.22
France	Mayotte (in the Indian Ocean)	75.55	75.19	75.93	0.74	−4.05	71.50	3.52	75.02	74.81	75.01	0.20	−0.53
Liechtenstein	—	84.31	—	—	—	−1.05	83.26	1.40	84.66	83.02	86.13	3.11	0.35
Norway	Oslo and Akershus	83.92	82.02	85.58	3.56	0.29	84.21	0.16	84.37	82.56	85.94	3.38	0.45
Norway	Northern Norway	83.72	81.72	85.58	3.86	0.28	84.00	0.16	84.16	82.26	85.94	3.68	0.44
Norway	Trøndelag	83.22	81.52	84.88	3.36	0.28	83.50	0.16	83.66	82.06	85.24	3.18	0.44
Norway	Agder and Rogaland	83.12	81.32	84.88	3.56	0.28	83.40	0.16	83.56	81.86	85.24	3.38	0.44
Norway	South-Eastern Norway: Østfold, Buskerud, Vestfold, Telemark	82.82	80.92	84.58	3.66	0.28	83.10	0.16	83.26	81.45	84.94	3.49	0.44
Norway	Hedmark and Oppland	82.12	80.52	83.67	3.15	0.28	82.40	0.15	82.55	81.05	84.03	2.98	0.43
Norway	Northern Norway	81.92	80.02	83.87	3.85	0.28	82.20	0.15	82.35	80.55	84.23	3.68	0.43
Sweden	Stockholm	83.76	81.79	85.55	3.76	0.11	83.87	0.48	84.35	82.74	85.86	3.12	0.59
Sweden	Småland and the islands	83.46	81.79	85.15	3.36	−0.19	83.27	0.57	83.84	82.03	85.66	3.63	0.38
Sweden	West Sweden	82.96	81.29	84.55	3.26	0.01	82.97	0.57	83.54	81.93	85.16	3.23	0.58
Sweden	East Middle Sweden	82.86	81.29	84.55	3.26	−0.09	82.77	0.47	83.24	81.53	84.86	3.33	0.38
Sweden	South Sweden	82.96	81.49	84.45	2.96	−0.29	82.67	0.37	83.04	81.53	84.66	3.13	0.08
Sweden	North Middle Sweden	82.56	80.69	84.45	3.76	−0.29	82.27	0.77	83.04	81.53	84.56	3.03	0.48
Sweden	Upper Norrland	82.06	80.49	83.65	3.16	0.01	82.07	0.57	82.64	81.23	84.06	2.83	0.58
Sweden	Middle Norrland	81.96	80.29	83.75	3.46	0.01	81.97	0.57	82.54	81.13	83.96	2.83	0.58
Finland	Åland	83.68	81.49	86.12	4.63	1.02	84.70	−0.45	84.25	82.32	86.10	3.78	0.57
Finland	Helsinki-Uusimaa	82.38	79.70	84.83	5.13	0.02	82.40	0.43	82.83	80.29	85.09	4.80	0.45
Finland	Western Finland	82.08	79.50	84.73	5.23	0.32	82.40	−0.08	82.32	79.78	84.89	5.11	0.24
Finland	Southern Finland	81.48	78.50	84.43	5.93	0.22	81.70	0.62	82.32	79.68	84.99	5.31	0.84
Finland	North & East Finland	81.28	78.70	83.93	5.23	0.12	81.40	0.31	81.71	79.17	84.48	5.31	0.43
United Kingdom	London region	83.27	81.38	85.08	3.70	−1.00	82.27	1.44	83.71	81.89	85.45	3.56	0.44
United Kingdom	South East England	83.03	81.36	84.64	3.28	−1.00	82.03	1.44	83.47	81.88	85.00	3.12	0.44
United Kingdom	East of England	82.55	80.81	84.24	3.43	−0.99	81.56	1.42	82.98	81.33	84.61	3.28	0.43
United Kingdom	South West England	82.54	80.74	84.31	3.57	−0.99	81.55	1.43	82.98	81.25	84.68	3.43	0.44
United Kingdom	East Midlands	81.54	79.92	83.21	3.29	−0.98	80.56	1.41	81.97	80.43	83.57	3.14	0.43
United Kingdom	Northern Ireland	81.29	79.54	82.93	3.39	−0.98	80.31	1.41	81.72	80.04	83.29	3.25	0.43
United Kingdom	West Midlands	81.17	79.35	82.97	3.62	−0.97	80.20	1.40	81.60	79.85	83.32	3.47	0.43
United Kingdom	Yorkshire and the Humber	80.96	79.21	82.69	3.48	−0.97	79.99	1.40	81.39	79.71	83.05	3.34	0.43
United Kingdom	Wales	80.76	78.84	82.71	3.87	−0.97	79.79	1.40	81.19	79.34	83.06	3.72	0.43
United Kingdom	North West England	80.63	78.86	82.35	3.49	−0.97	79.66	1.40	81.06	79.36	82.71	3.35	0.43
United Kingdom	North East England	80.24	78.32	82.15	3.83	−0.96	79.28	1.38	80.66	78.82	82.51	3.69	0.42
United Kingdom	Scotland	79.64	77.68	81.48	3.80	−0.96	78.68	1.38	80.06	78.17	81.84	3.67	0.42
Belgium	Flemish Brabant	83.15	81.14	85.00	3.86	0.44	83.59	0.10	83.69	81.73	85.68	3.95	0.54
Belgium	Limburg	83.05	81.14	85.00	3.86	0.14	83.19	0.09	83.28	81.53	84.98	3.45	0.23
Belgium	Antwerp	82.75	81.05	84.40	3.35	0.14	82.89	0.39	83.28	81.43	85.08	3.65	0.53
Belgium	Walloon Brabant	82.75	80.45	84.80	4.35	0.34	83.09	0.19	83.28	81.23	85.18	3.95	0.53
Belgium	West Flanders	82.95	80.55	85.40	4.85	−0.16	82.79	0.39	83.18	81.03	85.28	4.25	0.23
Belgium	East Flanders	82.36	80.05	84.60	4.55	0.33	82.69	0.39	83.08	81.13	85.08	3.95	0.72
Belgium	Brussels	81.36	78.95	83.60	4.65	0.03	81.39	0.69	82.08	79.62	84.37	4.75	0.72
Belgium	Namur	80.06	77.65	82.41	4.76	−0.07	79.99	0.78	80.77	78.41	83.17	4.76	0.71
Belgium	Belgian Luxembourg	80.36	77.35	83.50	6.15	−0.07	80.29	0.38	80.67	78.31	83.06	4.75	0.31
Belgium	Liège	80.36	78.35	82.21	3.86	−0.27	80.09	0.38	80.47	78.41	82.46	4.05	0.11
Belgium	Hainaut	79.37	76.45	82.31	5.86	−0.38	78.99	0.67	79.66	76.90	82.26	5.36	0.29
Austria	Tyrol	82.88	80.66	85.02	4.36	0.23	83.11	0.45	83.56	81.41	85.59	4.18	0.68
Austria	Salzburg	82.68	80.36	84.92	4.56	−0.47	82.21	1.14	83.35	81.51	85.08	3.57	0.67
Austria	Vorarlberg	83.18	80.96	85.22	4.26	−0.17	83.01	0.24	83.25	80.90	85.69	4.79	0.07
Austria	Upper Austria	82.18	79.96	84.32	4.36	−0.37	81.81	1.04	82.85	80.50	85.08	4.58	0.67
Austria	Styria	82.08	79.46	84.62	5.16	0.03	82.11	0.43	82.54	80.09	84.98	4.89	0.46
Austria	Burgenland	81.78	79.26	84.32	5.06	−0.07	81.71	0.73	82.44	80.29	84.48	4.19	0.66
Austria	Carinthia	82.08	79.46	84.62	5.16	−0.27	81.81	0.63	82.44	79.89	84.88	4.99	0.36
Austria	Lower Austria	81.58	79.36	83.73	4.37	−0.58	81.00	1.14	82.14	79.99	84.38	4.39	0.56
Austria	Vienna	80.98	78.47	83.33	4.86	−0.58	80.40	0.93	81.33	79.08	83.36	4.28	0.35
Andorra	—	83.00	—	—	—	−2.63	80.37	3.18	83.55	81.43	85.84	4.41	0.55
Slovenia	Coastal–Karst	82.81	80.15	85.40	5.25	−0.93	81.88	1.46	83.34	80.82	85.84	5.02	0.53
Slovenia	Upper Carniola	82.49	80.41	84.53	4.12	−0.92	81.57	1.46	83.03	81.08	84.96	3.88	0.54
Slovenia	Littoral–Inner Carniola	82.43	80.25	84.55	4.30	−0.93	81.50	1.46	82.96	80.92	84.98	4.06	0.53
Slovenia	Central Slovenia	81.84	79.54	84.09	4.55	−0.91	80.93	1.44	82.37	80.20	84.53	4.33	0.53
Slovenia	Carinthia	81.81	79.75	83.81	4.06	−0.92	80.89	1.45	82.34	80.41	84.24	3.83	0.53
Slovenia	Gorizia	81.63	78.55	84.66	6.11	−0.91	80.72	1.44	82.16	79.21	85.09	5.88	0.53
Slovenia	Lower Sava	80.96	78.30	83.56	5.26	−0.91	80.05	1.43	81.48	78.95	83.99	5.04	0.52
Slovenia	Central Sava	80.74	78.11	83.32	5.21	−0.90	79.84	1.42	81.26	78.76	83.75	4.99	0.52
Slovenia	Savinja	80.45	77.64	83.20	5.56	−0.90	79.55	1.42	80.97	78.29	83.63	5.34	0.52
Slovenia	Drava	80.41	77.92	82.86	4.94	−0.90	79.51	1.42	80.93	78.57	83.28	4.71	0.52
Slovenia	Southeast Slovenia	80.32	77.61	82.98	5.37	−0.90	79.42	1.42	80.84	78.26	83.40	5.14	0.52
Slovenia	Mura	80.29	77.56	82.96	5.40	−0.90	79.39	1.42	80.81	78.21	83.38	5.17	0.52
Ireland	West	82.76	80.68	84.34	3.66	−0.26	82.50	0.72	83.22	81.22	84.72	3.50	0.46
Ireland	Mid-East	82.71	80.89	84.04	3.15	−0.26	82.45	0.72	83.17	81.43	84.41	2.98	0.46
Ireland	Border	82.45	80.48	83.94	3.46	−0.26	82.19	0.72	82.91	81.02	84.31	3.29	0.46
Ireland	Midland	82.35	80.58	83.64	3.06	−0.26	82.09	0.72	82.81	81.12	84.01	2.89	0.46
Ireland	Dublin	82.20	80.17	83.74	3.57	−0.26	81.94	0.71	82.65	80.71	84.11	3.40	0.45
Ireland	South-East	82.10	80.17	83.53	3.36	−0.26	81.84	0.71	82.55	80.71	83.90	3.19	0.45
Ireland	South-West	81.99	79.76	83.74	3.98	−0.26	81.73	0.72	82.45	80.30	84.11	3.81	0.46
Ireland	Mid-West	81.43	79.45	82.93	3.48	−0.26	81.17	0.71	81.88	79.99	83.29	3.30	0.45
Portugal	North Region	82.20	79.21	84.93	5.72	−0.03	82.17	0.81	82.98	80.23	85.40	5.17	0.78
Portugal	Central Region	81.81	78.81	84.63	5.82	−0.54	81.27	1.21	82.48	79.62	85.20	5.58	0.67
Portugal	Lisbon metropolitan area	82.01	79.01	84.73	5.72	−1.73	80.28	1.90	82.18	79.12	84.90	5.78	0.17
Portugal	Algarve	80.51	76.62	84.53	7.91	−0.33	80.18	1.09	81.27	78.02	84.60	6.58	0.76
Portugal	Alentejo	80.51	77.21	83.74	6.53	−0.73	79.78	0.99	80.77	77.61	83.89	6.28	0.26
Portugal	Madeira (in the Atlantic Ocean)	78.61	75.02	81.74	6.72	0.57	79.18	0.58	79.76	76.61	82.59	5.98	1.15
Portugal	Azores (in the Atlantic Ocean)	78.61	75.92	81.24	5.32	0.08	78.69	−0.23	78.46	75.10	81.89	6.79	−0.15
Netherlands	Utrecht	82.55	81.15	83.86	2.71	−0.26	82.29	0.59	82.88	81.55	84.20	2.65	0.33
Netherlands	Zeeland	82.45	80.66	84.26	3.60	−0.86	81.59	1.18	82.77	80.95	84.60	3.65	0.32
Netherlands	North Holland	82.25	80.66	83.76	3.10	−0.36	81.89	0.68	82.57	81.15	84.00	2.85	0.32
Netherlands	North Brabant	82.15	80.46	83.76	3.30	−0.26	81.89	0.68	82.57	81.05	84.00	2.95	0.42
Netherlands	Flevoland	82.25	80.76	83.76	3.00	−0.86	81.39	1.08	82.47	81.05	84.00	2.95	0.22
Netherlands	South Holland	82.05	80.46	83.57	3.11	−0.36	81.69	0.78	82.47	80.85	84.00	3.15	0.42
Netherlands	Limburg	81.65	79.96	83.37	3.41	−0.66	80.99	1.48	82.47	80.74	84.10	3.36	0.82
Netherlands	Friesland	81.85	80.26	83.37	3.11	−0.26	81.59	0.78	82.37	81.05	83.69	2.64	0.52
Netherlands	Gelderland	81.95	80.56	83.17	2.61	−0.26	81.69	0.68	82.37	81.05	83.59	2.54	0.42
Netherlands	Overijssel	81.75	80.26	83.27	3.01	−0.36	81.39	0.78	82.17	80.64	83.69	3.05	0.42
Netherlands	Groningen	81.15	79.26	82.97	3.71	−0.06	81.09	0.57	81.66	79.94	83.39	3.45	0.51
Netherlands	Drenthe	81.75	80.16	83.37	3.21	−0.46	81.29	0.27	81.56	80.04	83.09	3.05	−0.19
Iceland	—	82.40	80.89	83.95	3.06	0.28	82.68	0.14	82.82	81.38	84.29	2.91	0.42
Luxembourg	—	82.14	79.88	84.42	4.54	0.49	82.63	−0.04	82.59	80.45	84.77	4.32	0.45
Greece	Epirus	83.54	81.21	86.07	4.86	−1.02	82.52	−0.06	82.46	79.75	85.59	5.84	−1.08
Greece	North Aegean	82.25	79.82	84.88	5.06	0.77	83.02	−0.96	82.06	79.65	84.79	5.14	−0.19
Greece	South Aegean	81.85	80.02	83.98	3.96	−0.33	81.52	−0.06	81.46	79.25	83.99	4.74	−0.39
Greece	Crete	81.65	78.93	84.58	5.65	−0.03	81.62	−0.16	81.46	78.65	84.59	5.94	−0.19
Greece	Western Macedonia	82.05	79.62	84.68	5.06	−1.43	80.62	0.54	81.16	78.26	84.49	6.23	−0.89
Greece	Thessaly	81.85	79.23	84.78	5.55	−1.93	79.92	0.95	80.87	78.26	83.69	5.43	−0.98
Greece	Attica	80.76	77.93	83.48	5.55	−1.04	79.72	0.95	80.67	78.16	83.09	4.93	−0.09
Greece	Peloponnese	81.65	79.03	84.58	5.55	−0.93	80.72	−0.15	80.57	78.06	83.49	5.43	−1.08
Greece	Central Greece	81.35	79.03	83.88	4.85	−0.93	80.42	0.05	80.47	77.76	83.49	5.73	−0.88
Greece	Ionian Islands	80.95	79.13	82.88	3.75	−0.33	80.62	−0.35	80.27	77.66	83.09	5.43	−0.68
Greece	Western Greece	81.05	78.63	83.58	4.95	−0.83	80.22	−0.15	80.07	77.56	82.89	5.33	−0.98
Greece	Central Macedonia	81.25	78.93	83.68	4.75	−2.02	79.23	0.74	79.97	77.26	82.69	5.43	−1.28
Greece	Eastern Macedonia and Thrace	80.66	78.43	82.88	4.45	−1.43	79.23	0.44	79.67	77.06	82.39	5.33	−0.99
Denmark	Central Denmark	81.94	80.04	83.96	3.92	−0.11	81.83	0.51	82.34	80.44	84.29	3.85	0.40
Denmark	Capital Region	81.44	79.34	83.46	4.12	0.09	81.53	0.60	82.13	80.24	83.99	3.75	0.69
Denmark	Southern Denmark	81.44	79.34	83.56	4.22	0.09	81.53	0.30	81.83	79.83	83.79	3.96	0.39
Denmark	North Denmark Region	81.24	79.34	83.16	3.82	−0.31	80.93	0.30	81.23	79.43	82.99	3.56	−0.01
Denmark	Zealand	80.74	78.94	82.46	3.52	−0.31	80.43	0.70	81.13	79.13	83.19	4.06	0.39
Germany	Baden-Württemberg	82.49	80.22	84.72	4.50	−0.63	81.86	0.34	82.20	79.94	84.42	4.48	−0.29
Germany	Bavaria	82.22	80.03	84.38	4.35	−1.01	81.21	0.49	81.70	79.34	84.08	4.74	−0.52
Germany	Hesse	81.94	79.75	84.07	4.32	−0.97	80.97	0.27	81.24	79.02	83.52	4.50	−0.70
Germany	Berlin	81.68	79.18	84.18	5.00	−0.95	80.73	0.45	81.18	78.44	83.84	5.40	−0.50
Germany	Saxony	81.46	78.46	84.56	6.10	−1.80	79.66	1.47	81.13	78.03	84.31	6.28	−0.33
Germany	Hamburg	81.68	79.28	84.08	4.80	−0.85	80.83	0.25	81.08	78.65	83.54	4.89	−0.60
Germany	Rhineland-Palatinate	81.46	79.26	83.60	4.34	−0.74	80.72	0.15	80.87	78.57	83.19	4.62	−0.59
Germany	Schleswig-Holstein	81.08	78.68	83.58	4.90	−0.35	80.73	−0.05	80.68	78.34	82.93	4.59	−0.40
Germany	Brandenburg	81.38	78.48	84.28	5.80	−1.64	79.74	0.84	80.58	77.54	83.64	6.10	−0.80
Germany	North Rhine-Westphalia	81.13	78.73	83.45	4.72	−0.78	80.35	0.16	80.51	78.12	82.86	4.74	−0.62
Germany	Lower Saxony	81.08	78.56	83.56	5.00	−0.64	80.44	0.00	80.44	78.00	83.01	5.01	−0.64
Germany	Thuringia	80.88	78.08	83.78	5.70	−2.04	78.84	1.23	80.07	77.14	83.03	5.89	−0.81
Germany	Mecklenburg-Vorpommern	80.48	77.38	83.78	6.40	−1.04	79.44	0.43	79.87	76.74	83.13	6.39	−0.61
Germany	Saarland	80.38	77.98	82.77	4.79	−0.84	79.54	−0.07	79.47	76.94	82.23	5.29	−0.91
Germany	Bremen	80.88	78.08	83.58	5.50	−0.94	79.94	−0.47	79.47	76.74	82.23	5.49	−1.41
Germany	Saxony-Anhalt	80.18	77.08	83.37	6.29	−1.84	78.34	0.73	79.07	75.84	82.53	6.69	−1.11
Cyprus *	—	81.40	79.51	83.27	3.76	−0.20	81.20	0.69	81.89	80.07	83.67	3.60	0.49
Estonia	Pohja-Eesti	79.62	75.57	83.14	7.57	−1.55	78.07	2.04	80.11	76.23	83.53	7.30	0.49
Estonia	Laane-Eesti	78.80	74.98	83.05	8.07	−1.53	77.27	2.01	79.28	75.63	83.44	7.81	0.48
Estonia	Louna-Eesti	78.71	73.65	82.62	8.97	−1.52	77.19	2.01	79.20	74.30	83.01	8.71	0.49
Estonia	Kesk-Eesti	77.83	73.39	81.44	8.05	−1.51	76.32	1.99	78.31	74.03	81.82	7.79	0.48
Estonia	Kirde-Eesti	75.43	72.79	81.76	8.97	−1.46	73.97	1.93	75.90	73.43	82.15	8.72	0.47
Turkey	East Black Sea Region	79.33	75.62	82.90	7.28	−1.84	77.49	2.49	79.98	76.33	83.45	7.12	0.65
Turkey	West Anatolia Region	78.33	75.15	81.40	6.25	−1.81	76.52	2.46	78.98	75.85	81.95	6.10	0.65
Turkey	Istanbul Region	78.25	75.04	81.32	6.28	−1.81	76.44	2.45	78.89	75.74	81.86	6.12	0.64
Turkey	Central East Anatolia Region	77.88	74.93	80.83	5.90	−1.80	76.08	2.44	78.52	75.63	81.37	5.74	0.64
Turkey	Mediterranean Region	77.77	74.88	80.69	5.81	−1.80	75.97	2.44	78.41	75.58	81.23	5.65	0.64
Turkey	West Black Sea Region	77.77	74.60	81.06	6.46	−1.80	75.97	2.44	78.41	75.30	81.60	6.30	0.64
Turkey	Central Anatolia Region	77.60	74.61	80.57	5.96	−1.80	75.80	2.44	78.24	75.31	81.11	5.80	0.64
Turkey	Aegean Region	77.56	74.35	80.83	6.48	−1.79	75.77	2.43	78.20	75.04	81.37	6.33	0.64
Turkey	Northeast Anatolia Region	77.50	74.54	80.63	6.09	−1.79	75.71	2.43	78.14	75.24	81.17	5.93	0.64
Turkey	East Marmara Region	77.46	74.45	80.47	6.02	−1.79	75.67	2.43	78.10	75.15	81.01	5.86	0.64
Turkey	Southeast Anatolia Region	77.44	74.10	80.64	6.54	−1.79	75.65	2.43	78.08	74.79	81.18	6.39	0.64
Turkey	West Marmara Region	77.11	73.77	80.57	6.80	−1.78	75.33	2.42	77.75	74.46	81.11	6.65	0.64
Czech Republic	Prague	80.87	78.50	83.06	4.56	−1.21	79.66	0.11	79.77	76.84	82.66	5.82	−1.10
Czech Republic	Southeast	79.77	76.70	82.76	6.06	−1.22	78.55	0.03	78.58	75.56	81.76	6.20	−1.19
Czech Republic	Northeast	79.57	76.90	82.16	5.26	−1.72	77.85	0.54	78.39	75.46	81.37	5.91	−1.18
Czech Republic	Central Bohemia	79.27	76.50	82.06	5.56	−1.42	77.85	0.54	78.39	75.36	81.47	6.11	−0.88
Czech Republic	Southwest	79.37	76.50	82.26	5.76	−1.52	77.85	0.44	78.29	75.46	81.07	5.61	−1.08
Czech Republic	Central Moravia	79.17	75.90	82.46	6.56	−1.53	77.64	0.45	78.09	74.87	81.47	6.60	−1.08
Czech Republic	Moravian-Silesian	77.77	74.40	81.26	6.86	−1.53	76.24	0.37	76.61	73.29	80.08	6.79	−1.16
Czech Republic	Northwest	77.57	74.70	80.36	5.66	−2.14	75.43	0.88	76.31	73.39	79.29	5.90	−1.26
Croatia	—	78.74	75.84	81.57	5.73	−1.16	77.58	1.66	79.24	76.42	82.00	5.58	0.50
Poland	Lesser Poland Voivodeship	79.14	75.39	82.77	7.38	−1.13	78.01	0.32	78.33	74.71	82.02	7.31	−0.81
Poland	Subcarpathian Voivodeship	79.34	75.39	83.27	7.88	−2.04	77.30	1.03	78.33	74.51	82.22	7.71	−1.01
Poland	Podlaskie Voivodeship	78.64	74.19	83.17	8.98	−2.25	76.39	1.34	77.73	73.31	82.22	8.91	−0.91
Poland	Masovian Voivodeship	78.36	74.45	82.25	7.80	−1.69	76.67	0.93	77.60	73.78	81.35	7.57	−0.76
Poland	Opole Voivodeship	78.14	74.39	81.97	7.58	−1.34	76.80	0.53	77.33	73.31	81.32	8.01	−0.81
Poland	Pomeranian Voivodeship	78.44	74.89	81.87	6.98	−1.24	77.20	0.03	77.23	73.71	80.72	7.01	−1.21
Poland	Greater Poland Voivodeship	78.04	74.39	81.57	7.18	−1.34	76.70	0.43	77.13	73.51	80.72	7.21	−0.91
Poland	Lublin Voivodeship	78.14	73.89	82.47	8.58	−2.05	76.09	1.04	77.13	73.01	81.32	8.31	−1.01
Poland	Świętokrzyskie Voivodeship	77.94	73.79	82.27	8.48	−1.55	76.39	0.44	76.83	72.61	81.22	8.61	−1.11
Poland	Kuyavian–Pomeranian Voivodeship	77.44	73.79	81.07	7.28	−1.55	75.89	0.74	76.63	73.21	80.03	6.82	−0.81
Poland	Lower Silesian Voivodeship	77.44	73.49	81.37	7.88	−1.15	76.29	0.24	76.53	72.71	80.43	7.72	−0.91
Poland	West Pomeranian Voivodeship	77.44	73.69	81.17	7.48	−1.35	76.09	0.44	76.53	72.61	80.43	7.82	−0.91
Poland	Silesian Voivodeship	77.44	73.99	80.87	6.88	−1.55	75.89	0.54	76.43	72.91	80.03	7.12	−1.01
Poland	Lubusz Voivodeship	76.84	72.89	80.87	7.98	−1.46	75.38	0.95	76.33	72.51	80.13	7.62	−0.51
Poland	Warmian–Masurian Voivodeship	77.14	72.89	81.27	8.38	−1.45	75.69	0.54	76.23	72.31	80.33	8.02	−0.91
Poland	Łódź Voivodeship	76.84	72.59	81.07	8.48	−1.26	75.58	0.35	75.93	72.01	79.73	7.72	−0.91
Azerbaijan	Shaki-Zagatala ER	77.67	74.66	81.35	6.69	−3.97	73.70	4.38	78.08	75.00	81.80	6.80	0.41
Azerbaijan	Baku ER	76.28	73.33	79.69	6.36	−3.90	72.38	4.31	76.69	73.66	80.13	6.47	0.41
Azerbaijan	Absheron-Khizi ER	75.03	72.11	78.17	6.06	−3.84	71.19	4.23	75.42	72.44	78.60	6.16	0.39
Azerbaijan	Guba-Khachmaz ER	74.80	71.90	77.90	6.00	−3.82	70.98	4.22	75.20	72.22	78.33	6.11	0.40
Azerbaijan	Mountainous Shirvan ER	74.67	71.77	77.74	5.97	−3.82	70.85	4.21	75.06	72.09	78.17	6.08	0.39
Azerbaijan	Lankaran	74.03	71.14	76.96	5.82	−3.79	70.24	4.18	74.42	71.46	77.38	5.92	0.39
Azerbaijan	Central Aran ER, Mil-Mughan ER, Shirvan-Salyan ER	70.38	67.51	72.48	4.97	−3.60	66.78	3.97	70.75	67.82	72.88	5.06	0.37
Azerbaijan	Ganja-Dashkasan ER, Gazakh-Tovuz ER	70.33	67.46	72.42	4.96	−3.60	66.73	3.97	70.70	67.77	72.82	5.05	0.37
Azerbaijan	Karabakh ER	68.20	65.29	69.77	4.48	−3.48	64.72	3.84	68.56	65.58	70.15	4.57	0.36
Slovakia	Bratislava Region	79.14	76.10	81.79	5.69	−1.78	77.36	−0.05	77.31	74.52	79.89	5.37	−1.83
Slovakia	Western Slovakia	77.84	74.60	81.09	6.49	−2.98	74.86	0.50	75.36	71.88	78.81	6.93	−2.48
Slovakia	Central Slovakia	77.04	73.21	80.89	7.68	−2.49	74.55	0.42	74.97	71.30	78.81	7.51	−2.07
Slovakia	Eastern Slovakia	77.44	74.00	80.69	6.69	−3.29	74.15	0.52	74.67	71.30	78.32	7.02	−2.77
Latvia	Pieriga region	76.59	72.31	80.54	8.23	−1.98	74.61	2.38	76.99	72.82	80.89	8.07	0.40
Latvia	Riga region	75.84	71.30	80.04	8.74	−1.97	73.87	2.36	76.23	71.80	80.39	8.59	0.39
Latvia	Zemgale region	75.58	71.30	79.54	8.24	−1.95	73.63	2.35	75.98	71.80	79.89	8.09	0.40
Latvia	Vidzeme region	75.58	70.89	79.94	9.05	−1.95	73.63	2.35	75.98	71.39	80.29	8.90	0.40
Latvia	Kurzeme region	74.98	70.39	79.24	8.85	−1.94	73.04	2.33	75.37	70.88	79.59	8.71	0.39
Latvia	Latgale region	73.36	68.05	78.34	10.29	−1.90	71.46	2.29	73.75	68.53	78.68	10.15	0.39
Hungary	Central Hungary and Budapest	78.50	75.72	80.81	5.09	−1.63	76.87	0.10	76.97	74.12	79.50	5.38	−1.53
Hungary	Western Transdanubia	77.86	74.55	80.87	6.32	−1.72	76.14	0.25	76.39	73.20	79.54	6.34	−1.47
Hungary	Southern Transdanubia	76.55	73.24	79.66	6.42	−1.83	74.72	0.58	75.30	72.00	78.45	6.45	−1.25
Hungary	Central Transdanubia	76.75	73.34	80.06	6.72	−1.82	74.93	0.37	75.30	71.90	78.65	6.75	−1.45
Hungary	Southern Great Plain	76.75	73.54	79.76	6.22	−2.03	74.72	0.28	75.00	71.51	78.45	6.94	−1.75
Hungary	Northern Great Plain	76.05	72.53	79.36	6.83	−2.03	74.02	0.48	74.50	71.01	77.95	6.94	−1.55
Hungary	Northern Hungary	75.04	71.42	78.66	7.24	−2.04	73.00	0.61	73.61	70.11	77.06	6.95	−1.43
Montenegro	—	77.04	73.87	80.22	6.35	−0.70	76.34	0.51	76.85	73.48	80.26	6.78	−0.19
Albania	—	79.28	77.17	81.67	4.50	−2.82	76.46	0.37	76.83	74.50	79.47	4.97	−2.45
Romania	București - Ilfov	78.14	74.59	81.20	6.61	−2.78	75.36	0.20	75.56	72.31	78.36	6.05	−2.58
Romania	South-West	77.13	73.78	80.59	6.81	−2.28	74.85	−0.38	74.47	71.21	77.87	6.66	−2.66
Romania	Centru	76.93	73.48	80.39	6.91	−2.18	74.75	−0.28	74.47	71.12	77.96	6.84	−2.46
Romania	North West	76.63	73.07	80.09	7.02	−2.39	74.24	0.04	74.28	71.12	77.47	6.35	−2.35
Romania	West	76.52	73.28	79.69	6.41	−2.58	73.94	0.04	73.98	70.92	77.08	6.16	−2.54
Romania	South - Muntenia	76.42	72.77	80.09	7.32	−2.59	73.83	−0.24	73.59	70.12	77.38	7.26	−2.83
Romania	North East	75.51	71.65	79.79	8.14	−2.08	73.43	0.16	73.59	69.83	77.57	7.74	−1.92
Romania	South East	75.31	71.05	79.79	8.74	−1.78	73.53	−0.14	73.39	69.83	77.28	7.45	−1.92
Bosnia and Herzegovina	—	77.24	75.21	79.22	4.01	−1.94	75.30	−0.01	75.29	73.13	77.50	4.37	−1.95
Lithuania	Vilnius County	76.97	72.31	81.38	9.07	−2.52	74.45	0.58	75.03	70.23	79.87	9.64	−1.94
Lithuania	Klaipeda County	76.87	72.88	80.63	7.75	−2.51	74.36	0.58	74.94	70.78	79.13	8.35	−1.93
Lithuania	Kaunas County	76.79	72.10	81.23	9.13	−2.51	74.28	0.57	74.85	70.02	79.72	9.70	−1.94
Lithuania	Telsiai County	76.69	71.58	81.56	9.98	−2.51	74.18	0.58	74.76	69.52	80.04	10.52	−1.93
Lithuania	Marijampole County	76.26	71.48	80.80	9.32	−2.49	73.77	0.57	74.34	69.42	79.30	9.88	−1.92
Lithuania	Siauliai County	76.16	71.52	80.55	9.03	−2.49	73.67	0.57	74.24	69.46	79.05	9.59	−1.92
Lithuania	Alytus County	76.06	70.92	80.94	10.02	−2.49	73.57	0.57	74.14	68.88	79.44	10.56	−1.92
Lithuania	Panevezys County	75.91	70.43	81.14	10.71	−2.48	73.43	0.57	74.00	68.40	79.63	11.23	−1.91
Lithuania	Taurage County	75.55	69.68	81.16	11.48	−2.47	73.08	0.56	73.64	67.67	79.65	11.98	−1.91
Lithuania	Utena County	74.95	70.07	79.59	9.52	−2.45	72.50	0.56	73.06	68.06	78.11	10.05	−1.89
North Macedonia	Skopski	77.90	75.69	80.16	4.47	−3.48	74.42	0.04	74.46	72.27	76.83	4.56	−3.44
North Macedonia	Vardarski	77.29	75.12	79.46	4.34	−3.45	73.84	0.05	73.89	71.73	76.16	4.43	−3.40
North Macedonia	East	77.02	74.28	80.06	5.78	−3.44	73.58	0.05	73.63	70.93	76.73	5.80	−3.39
North Macedonia	South West	76.29	73.59	79.20	5.61	−3.41	72.88	0.05	72.93	70.27	75.91	5.64	−3.36
North Macedonia	North East	76.07	73.39	78.95	5.56	−3.40	72.67	0.05	72.72	70.08	75.67	5.59	−3.35
North Macedonia	Poloski	75.26	72.63	78.01	5.38	−3.36	71.90	0.05	71.95	69.35	74.77	5.42	−3.31
North Macedonia	Pelagoniski	74.88	72.27	77.56	5.29	−3.34	71.54	0.05	71.59	69.01	74.34	5.33	−3.29
North Macedonia	South East	73.98	71.41	76.50	5.09	−3.30	70.68	0.04	70.72	68.19	73.33	5.14	−3.26
Serbia ****	—	76.70	73.61	79.67	6.06	−2.51	74.19	−0.05	74.14	71.28	76.98	5.70	−2.56
Armenia	—	75.44	70.40	79.86	9.46	−3.40	72.04	1.33	73.37	67.87	78.45	10.58	−2.07
Belarus	—	74.22	68.94	79.38	10.44	−1.78	72.44	0.81	73.25	68.09	78.38	10.29	−0.97
Kosovo ****	Ferizaj	72.78	—	—	—	0.22	73.00	0.25	73.25	—	—	—	0.47
Kosovo ****	Gjilan	72.71	—	—	—	0.29	73.00	0.25	73.25	—	—	—	0.54
Kosovo ****	Mitrovica	72.65	—	—	—	0.35	73.00	0.25	73.25	—	—	—	0.60
Kosovo ****	Pristina	72.61	—	—	—	0.39	73.00	0.25	73.25	—	—	—	0.64
Kosovo ****	Gjakova	72.47	—	—	—	0.53	73.00	0.25	73.25	—	—	—	0.78
Kosovo ****	Prizren	72.30	—	—	—	0.70	73.00	0.25	73.25	—	—	—	0.95
Kosovo ****	Peja	72.07	—	—	—	0.93	73.00	0.25	73.25	—	—	—	1.18
Russia	Northwestern FD	77.11	—	—	—	−4.75	72.36	0.70	73.06	—	—	—	−4.05
Russia	Central FD	75.15	—	—	—	−4.59	70.56	0.71	71.27	—	—	—	−3.88
Russia	North Caucasian FD	74.23	—	—	—	−4.51	69.72	0.70	70.42	—	—	—	−3.81
Russia	Southern FD **	74.18	—	—	—	−4.73	69.45	0.59	70.04	—	—	—	−4.14
Russia	Ural FD	73.27	—	—	—	−4.26	69.01	0.80	69.81	—	—	—	−3.46
Russia	Volga FD	73.51	—	—	—	−4.44	69.07	0.72	69.79	—	—	—	−3.72
Russia	Siberian FD	71.65	—	—	—	−4.40	67.25	0.66	67.91	—	—	—	−3.74
Russia	Far Eastern FD	71.04	—	—	—	−4.56	66.48	0.56	67.04	—	—	—	−4.00
Georgia	Shida Kartli ***	74.62	69.53	79.83	10.30	−1.80	72.82	−0.11	72.71	67.77	77.82	10.05	−1.91
Georgia	Kvemo Kartli	74.33	69.27	79.47	10.20	−1.80	72.53	−0.11	72.42	67.52	77.48	9.96	−1.91
Georgia	Imereti, Racha-Lechkhumi and Kvemo Svaneti ***	74.28	69.22	79.41	10.19	−1.80	72.48	−0.11	72.37	67.47	77.42	9.95	−1.91
Georgia	Samtskhe–Javakheti	74.12	69.08	79.22	10.14	−1.79	72.33	−0.11	72.22	67.33	77.23	9.90	−1.90
Georgia	Adjara	72.78	67.86	77.59	9.73	−1.76	71.02	−0.11	70.91	66.15	75.64	9.49	−1.87
Georgia	Guria	72.52	67.63	77.27	9.64	−1.75	70.77	−0.11	70.66	65.92	75.33	9.41	−1.86
Georgia	Samegrelo-Zemo Svaneti	72.46	67.57	77.20	9.63	−1.75	70.71	−0.11	70.60	65.86	75.26	9.40	−1.86
Georgia	Tbilisi	71.78	66.46	77.24	10.78	−1.73	70.05	−0.11	69.94	64.78	75.30	10.52	−1.84
Georgia	Kakheti	71.10	66.33	75.54	9.21	−1.71	69.39	−0.11	69.28	64.66	73.65	8.99	−1.82
Georgia	Mtskheta-Mtianeti ***	65.53	60.64	69.52	8.88	−1.58	63.95	−0.10	63.85	59.11	67.77	8.66	−1.68
Bulgaria	Southwest Region	75.89	72.47	79.37	6.90	−3.30	72.59	−0.10	72.49	69.38	75.79	6.41	−3.40
Bulgaria	South-Central Region	75.50	71.97	79.17	7.20	−3.01	72.49	−0.58	71.91	68.61	75.60	6.99	−3.59
Bulgaria	Northeast Region	74.90	71.47	78.37	6.90	−3.31	71.59	−0.16	71.43	68.22	74.93	6.71	−3.47
Bulgaria	Southeast Region	74.40	70.87	78.07	7.20	−3.02	71.38	−0.33	71.05	67.64	74.73	7.09	−3.35
Bulgaria	North-Central Region	74.50	71.17	77.97	6.80	−3.72	70.78	−0.22	70.56	67.25	74.16	6.91	−3.94
Bulgaria	Northwest Region	73.60	70.37	77.28	6.91	−3.52	70.08	−0.38	69.70	66.38	73.58	7.20	−3.90
Kazakhstan	Central region (Karagandinskaya)	74.31	70.08	78.54	8.46	−2.29	72.02	0.13	72.15	68.24	76.15	7.91	−2.16
Kazakhstan	North region (Astana city, Akmolinskaya, Kostnaiskaya, Pavlodarskaya, North-Kazakhstanskaya)	73.75	69.57	77.88	8.31	−2.27	71.48	0.13	71.61	67.75	75.51	7.76	−2.14
Kazakhstan	West region (Aktyubinskaya, Atyrauskaya, Mangistauskaya, West-Kazakhstanskaya)	71.66	67.63	75.39	7.76	−2.21	69.45	0.13	69.58	65.86	73.10	7.24	−2.08
Kazakhstan	South region (Almatinskaya, Zhambylskaya, Kyzylordinskaya, Turkestanskaya)	70.42	66.48	73.91	7.43	−2.17	68.25	0.13	68.38	64.73	71.67	6.94	−2.04
Kazakhstan	Almaty city	69.92	66.00	73.31	7.31	−2.16	67.76	0.13	67.89	64.27	71.08	6.81	−2.03
Kazakhstan	East region (East-Kazakhstanskaya)	68.74	64.89	71.89	7.00	−2.12	66.62	0.12	66.74	63.19	69.71	6.52	−2.00
Moldova	South	71.89	67.25	76.77	9.52	−2.11	69.78	−0.23	69.55	65.06	74.44	9.38	−2.34
Moldova	Chișinău	71.21	66.63	75.95	9.32	−2.10	69.11	−0.22	68.89	64.46	73.64	9.18	−2.32
Moldova	North	70.73	66.19	75.37	9.18	−2.08	68.65	−0.23	68.42	64.03	73.08	9.05	−2.31
Moldova	Center	70.44	65.93	75.02	9.09	−2.07	68.37	−0.22	68.15	63.78	72.74	8.96	−2.29
Ukraine **	—	74.54	69.21	79.59	10.38	−2.92	71.62	−3.06	68.56	63.53	73.90	10.37	−5.98

* De facto there are two states on the island Cyprus: the Republic of Cyprus (~70% of the island's population) and Northern Cyprus, recognized only by Turkey. Due to national, cultural, economic, natural and climatic features, life expectancy in them can differ.

** Statistics for the Southern Federal District of Russia and for Ukraine are given based on consideration that Crimea is part of Ukraine. According to Rosstat estimates, the life expectancy in Crimea in these years is close to the average life expectancy in the Southern FD. Taking into account amount of population in Crimea, inclusion of Crimea in one or another territory affects the statistics of these territories only within a tenth of a year.

*** Parts of these Georgian regions are inside South Ossetia - a disputed territory, de facto this is a partially recognised state. There are no available data on life expectancy in South Ossetia, the statistics for the mentioned Georgian regions are given without the statistics for South Ossetia.

**** Kosovo is a disputed territory. De facto this is a partially recognised state. The statistics for Serbia are given without taking into account the statistics for Kosovo.

== See also ==
- List of European countries by life expectancy
- List of German states by life expectancy
- List of Spanish provinces by life expectancy
- List of Italian provinces by life expectancy
- List of French departments by life expectancy
- List of British regions by life expectancy
- List of Swedish counties by life expectancy
- List of Finnish regions by life expectancy
- List of Turkish provinces by life expectancy
- List of oldest people
- Longevity
- Life extension
