= Dresden (region) =

Coordinates: 51°10′N 14°00′E

Dresden Direktionsbezirk Dresden
- Direktionsbezirk
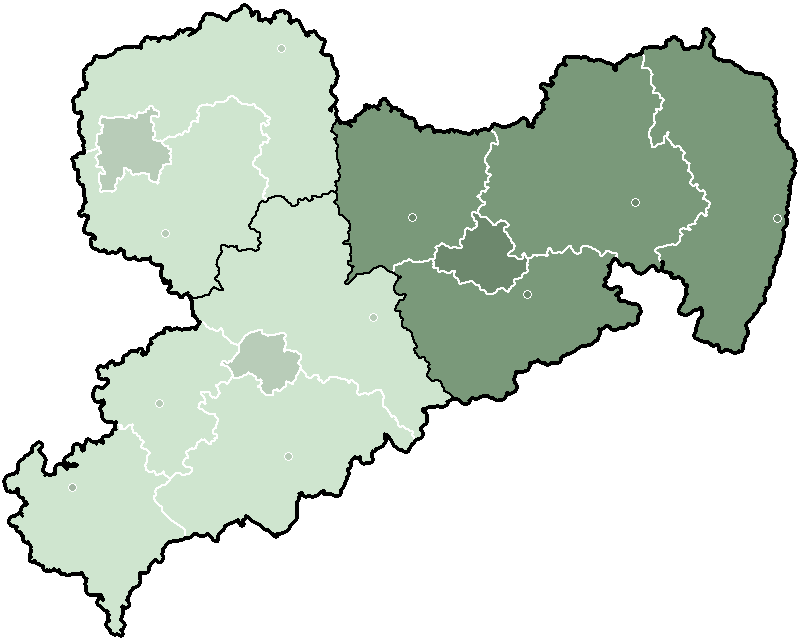
- Map of Saxony highlighting the former Direktionsbezirk of Dresden
- Country: Germany
- State: Saxony
- Disestablished: 1 March 2012
- Region seat: Dresden

Area
  - Total: 7,931 km^{2} (3,062 sq mi)

Population (31 Dec. 2010)
  - Total: 1,626,870
  - Density: 205.1/km^{2} (531.3/sq mi)

GDP
  - Total: €54.425 billion (2021)
- Website: www.rp-dresden.de

Dresden is one of the three former Direktionsbezirke of Saxony, Germany, located in the east of the state. It coincided with the Planungsregionen Oberlausitz-Niederschlesien and Oberes Elbtal/Osterzgebirge.

== History ==
The Direktionsbezirk Dresden came into existence on 1 August 2008, and succeeded the Dresden Government Region. It was disbanded in March 2012.

== Administrative divisions ==
Kreise
(districts)
1. Bautzen
2. Görlitz
3. Meißen
4. Sächsische Schweiz-Osterzgebirge
Kreisfreie Städte
(district-free towns)
1. Dresden

== See also ==
- Bezirk Dresden
