= Dresden Government Region =

Former government district of Dresden in Germany

Dresden Government Region (German: Regierungsbezirk Dresden) was one of the government regions (Regierungsbezirke) of Saxony from 1991 to 2008.
