= East Marmara region (statistical) =

East Marmara Region Doğu Marmara Bölgesi
- Region
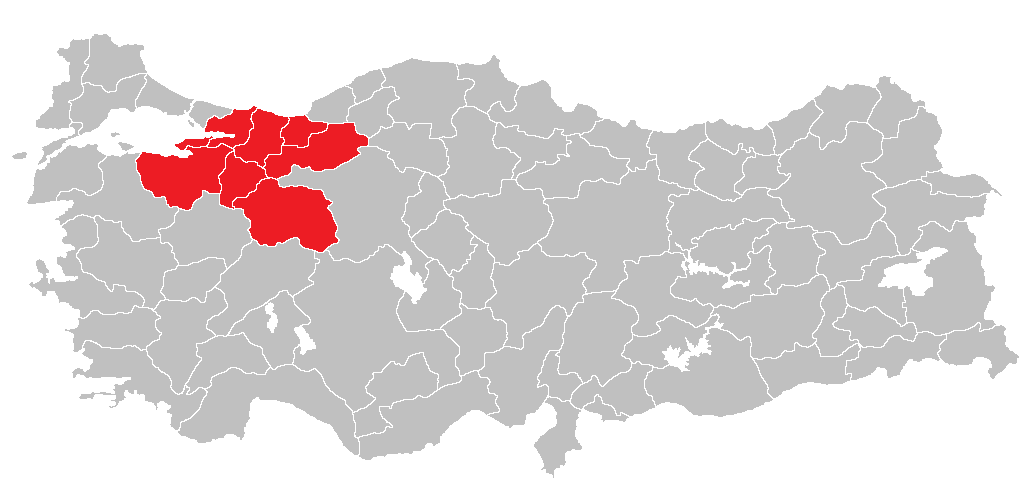
- Country: Turkey

Area
  - Region: 49,404 km^{2} (19,075 sq mi)

Population (2025)
  - Region: 8,759,256
  - Rank: 5th
  - Density: 177.30/km^{2} (459.20/sq mi)
  - Urban: 7,855,815
  - Rural: 903,441
- HDI (2023): 0.862 very high · 3rd

The East Marmara Region (Turkish: Doğu Marmara Bölgesi) (TR4) is a statistical region in Turkey.

== Subregions and provinces ==
- Bursa Subregion (TR41)
  - Bursa Province (TR411)
  - Eskişehir Province (TR412)
  - Bilecik Province (TR413)
- Kocaeli Subregion (TR42)
  - Kocaeli Province (TR421)
  - Sakarya Province (TR422)
  - Düzce Province (TR423)
  - Bolu Province (TR424)
  - Yalova Province (TR425)

== Population ==
Historical population
Year	Pop.	±% p.a.
1927	1,174,433	—
1935	1,334,705	+1.61%
1940	1,429,342	+1.38%
1945	1,564,628	+1.83%
1950	1,736,868	+2.11%
1955	1,930,143	+2.13%
1960	2,220,879	+2.85%
1965	2,433,181	+1.84%
1970	2,694,333	+2.06%
1975	2,995,945	+2.14%
1980	3,456,692	+2.90%
1985	3,939,844	+2.65%
1990	4,575,813	+3.04%
1997	5,437,549	+2.50%
2000	5,741,241	+1.83%
2007	6,417,153	+1.60%
2008	6,579,426	+2.53%
2009	6,701,343	+1.85%
2010	6,841,607	+2.09%
2011	6,952,685	+1.62%
2012	7,058,367	+1.52%
2013	7,198,284	+1.98%
2014	7,332,137	+1.86%
2015	7,499,352	+2.28%
2016	7,684,187	+2.46%
2017	7,824,597	+1.83%
2018	7,968,135	+1.83%
2019	8,124,975	+1.97%
2020	8,235,816	+1.36%
2021	8,380,829	+1.76%
2022	8,511,450	+1.56%
2023	8,598,503	+1.02%
2024	8,676,119	+0.90%
2025	8,759,256	+0.96%

=== Structure of the population ===
Structure of the population

Structure of the population (31.12.2024):

Age group	Male	Female	Total	Percent
Total	4,342,195	4,333,924	8,676,119	100
0–4	247,516	234,099	481,615	5.55
5–9	314,441	298,163	612,604	7.06
10–14	313,287	295,727	609,014	7.02
15–19	311,866	291,964	603,830	6.96
20–24	313,587	297,597	611,184	7.05
25–29	331,733	320,028	651,761	7.51
30–34	325,405	319,522	644,927	7.43
35–39	332,158	327,930	660,088	7.61
40–44	350,940	347,868	698,808	8.06
45–49	321,752	314,239	635,991	7.33
50–54	289,730	290,032	579,762	6.68
55–59	244,524	243,290	487,814	5.62
60–64	217,325	229,701	447,026	5.15
65–69	172,616	185,916	358,532	4.13
70–74	118,804	137,365	256,169	2.95
75–79	74,025	98,513	172,538	1.99
80–84	38,581	58,020	96,601	1.11
85–89	16,969	29,323	46,292	0.54
90+	6,936	14,627	21,563	0.25

Age group	Male	Female	Total	Percent
0–14	875,244	827,989	1,703,233	19.63
15–64	3,039,020	2,982,171	6,021,191	69.40
65+	427,931	523,764	951,695	10.97

Structure of the population (31.12.2025):

Age group	Male	Female	Total	Percent
Total	4,383,821	4,375,435	8,759,256	100
0–4	237,163	224,782	461,945	5.27
5–9	306,163	290,475	596,638	6.81
10–14	318,724	301,090	619,814	7.08
15–19	314,541	293,003	607,544	6.94
20–24	308,953	292,848	601,801	6.87
25–29	337,996	322,883	660,879	7.55
30–34	328,347	321,971	650,318	7.42
35–39	332,242	327,438	659,680	7.53
40–44	345,804	342,998	688,802	7.86
45–49	336,704	330,710	667,414	7.62
50–54	295,096	294,186	589,282	6.73
55–59	243,449	241,702	485,151	5.54
60–64	225,774	237,678	463,452	5.29
65–69	176,762	189,574	366,336	4.18
70–74	128,494	150,060	278,554	3.18
75–79	80,815	106,125	186,940	2.13
80–84	41,568	61,513	103,081	1.18
85–89	18,304	31,697	50,001	0.57
90+	6,922	14,702	21,624	0.25

Age group	Male	Female	Total	Percent
0–14	862,050	816,347	1,678,397	19.16
15–64	3,068,906	3,005,417	6,074,323	69.35
65+	452,865	553,671	1,006,536	11.49

== Internal immigration ==
Between December 31, 2024 and December 31, 2025
Region	Population	Immigrants	Emigrants	Net immigrants	Net immigration rate
East Marmara	8,759,256	234,344	184,755	49,589	5.68

=== State register location of East Marmara residents ===
As of December 31, 2025
Region	Population	Percentage
Istanbul	118,844	1.4
West Marmara	157,230	1.8
Aegean	265,097	3.0
East Marmara	4,499,368	51.4
West Anatolia	166,128	1.9
Mediterranean	181,564	2.1
Central Anatolia	318,249	3.6
West Black Sea	617,775	7.0
East Black Sea	658,065	7.5
Northeast Anatolia	815,266	9.3
Central East Anatolia	489,089	5.6
Southeast Anatolia	313.796	3.6
Foreign National	158,785	1.8
Total	8,759,256	100

== Marital status of 15+ population by gender ==
As of December 31, 2025
Gender	Never married	%	Married	%	Divorced	%	Spouse died	%	Total
Male	1,091,731	31.0	2,199,254	62.4	167,624	4.8	63,162	1.8	3,521,771
Female	797,179	22.4	2,195,932	61.7	207,217	5.8	358,760	10.1	3,559,088
Total	1,888,910	26.7	4,395,186	62.1	374,841	5.3	421,922	6.0	7,080,859

== Education status of 15+ population by gender ==
As of December 31, 2025
Gender	Illiterate	%	Literate with no diploma	%	Primary school	%	Primary education	%	Middle school	%	High school	%	College or university	%	Master's degree	%	Doctorate	%	Unknown	%	Total
Male	12,822	0.4	26,712	0.8	419,481	12.2	283,922	8.2	651,707	18.9	1,214,671	35.2	720,894	20.9	83,043	2.4	14,706	0.4	22,345	0.6	3,450,303
Female	95,142	2.7	106,254	3.0	759,580	21.7	249,878	7.2	555,701	15.9	911,288	26.1	699,820	20.0	77,744	2.2	10,871	0.3	26,266	0.8	3,492,544
All genders	107,964	1.6	132,966	1.9	1,179,061	17.0	533,800	7.7	1,207,408	17.4	2,125,959	30.6	1,420,714	20.5	160,787	2.3	25,577	0.4	48,611	0.7	6,942,847

== See also ==
- NUTS of Turkey

== Sources ==
- ESPON Database
