= Kırıkkale Subregion =

Kırıkkale Subregion Kırıkkale Alt Bölgesi
- Subregion
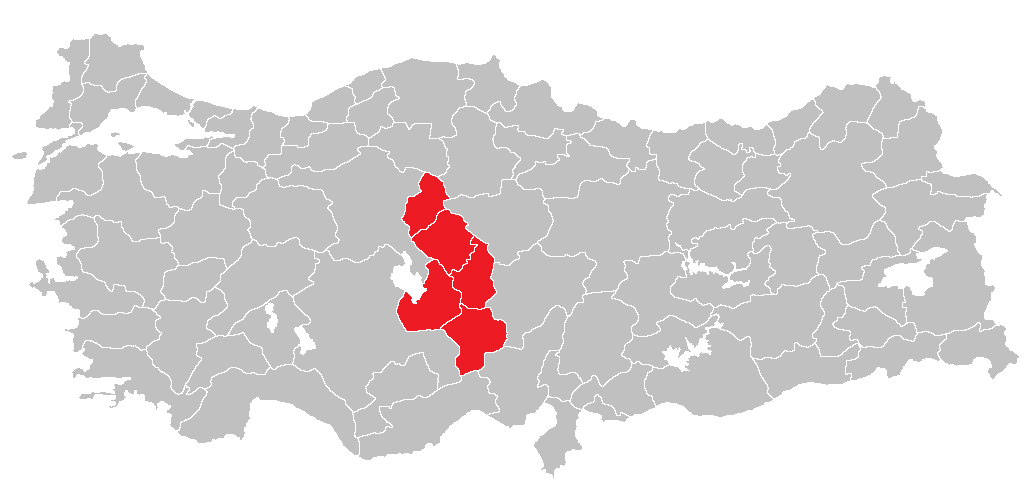
- Coordinates: 38°27′54.871″N 34°32′46.068″E
- Country: Turkey
- Region: Central Anatolia

Area
  - Subregion: 31,340 km^{2} (12,100 sq mi)

Population (2013)
  - Subregion: 1,510,080
  - Rank: 22nd
  - Density: 48.18/km^{2} (124.8/sq mi)
  - Urban: 988,156
  - Rural: 521,924

The Kırıkkale Subregion (Turkish: Kırıkkale Alt Bölgesi) (TR71) is a statistical subregion in Turkey.

== Provinces ==
- Kırıkkale Province (TR711)
- Aksaray Province (TR712)
- Niğde Province (TR713)
- Nevşehir Province (TR714)
- Kırşehir Province (TR715)

== See also ==
- NUTS of Turkey

== Sources ==
- ESPON Database
