= Northeast Anatolia region =

Northeast Anatolia Region Kuzeydoğu Anadolu Bölgesi
- Region
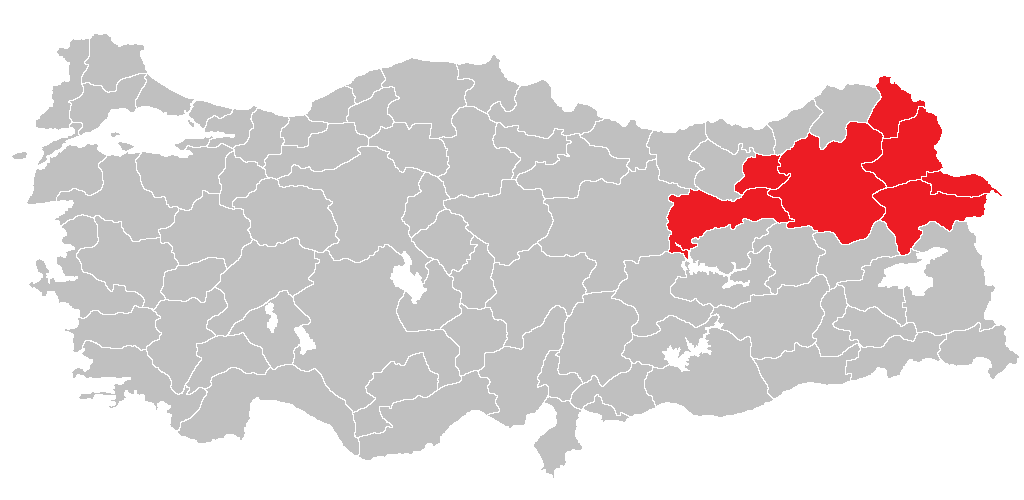
- Country: Turkey

Area
  - Region: 70,903 km^{2} (27,376 sq mi)

Population (2025)
  - Region: 2,115,281
  - Rank: 12th
  - Density: 29.833/km^{2} (77.268/sq mi)
  - Urban: 1,306,250
  - Rural: 809,031
- HDI (2023): 0.807 very high · 10th

The Northeast Anatolia Region (Turkish: Kuzeydoğu Anadolu Bölgesi) (TRA) is a statistical region in Turkey.

== Subregions and provinces ==
- Erzurum Subregion (TRA1)
  - Erzurum Province (TRA11)
  - Erzincan Province (TRA12)
  - Bayburt Province (TRA13)
- Ağrı Subregion (TRA2)
  - Ağrı Province (TRA21)
  - Kars Province (TRA22)
  - Iğdır Province (TRA23)
  - Ardahan Province (TRA24)

== Population ==
Historical population
| Year | Pop. | ±% p.a. |
|---|---|---|
| 1927 | 712,183 | — |
| 1935 | 955,473 | +3.74% |
| 1940 | 1,007,903 | +1.07% |
| 1945 | 1,082,424 | +1.44% |
| 1950 | 1,224,551 | +2.50% |
| 1955 | 1,404,660 | +2.78% |
| 1960 | 1,570,587 | +2.26% |
| 1965 | 1,739,861 | +2.07% |
| 1970 | 1,911,402 | +1.90% |
| 1975 | 2,067,948 | +1.59% |
| 1980 | 2,152,078 | +0.80% |
| 1985 | 2,299,722 | +1.34% |
| 1990 | 2,354,030 | +0.47% |
| 1997 | 2,316,066 | −0.23% |
| 2000 | 2,507,738 | +2.69% |
| 2007 | 2,212,759 | −1.77% |
| 2008 | 2,201,862 | −0.49% |
| 2009 | 2,198,061 | −0.17% |
| 2010 | 2,202,106 | +0.18% |
| 2011 | 2,230,394 | +1.28% |
| 2012 | 2,226,155 | −0.19% |
| 2013 | 2,207,602 | −0.83% |
| 2014 | 2,206,326 | −0.06% |
| 2015 | 2,195,359 | −0.50% |
| 2016 | 2,201,368 | +0.27% |
| 2017 | 2,188,214 | −0.60% |
| 2018 | 2,211,054 | +1.04% |
| 2019 | 2,200,022 | −0.50% |
| 2020 | 2,192,453 | −0.34% |
| 2021 | 2,183,098 | −0.43% |
| 2022 | 2,154,748 | −1.30% |
| 2023 | 2,171,569 | +0.78% |
| 2024 | 2,140,232 | −1.44% |
| 2025 | 2,115,281 | −1.17% |

=== Structure of the population ===
Structure of the population

Structure of the population (31.12.2024):

| Age group | Male | Female | Total | Percent |
|---|---|---|---|---|
| Total | 1,091,066 | 1,049,166 | 2,140,232 | 100 |
| 0–4 | 77,192 | 73,095 | 150,287 | 7.02 |
| 5–9 | 93,767 | 90,126 | 183,893 | 8.59 |
| 10–14 | 96,129 | 91,456 | 187,585 | 8.77 |
| 15–19 | 93,249 | 91,761 | 185,010 | 8.64 |
| 20–24 | 102,928 | 97,803 | 200,731 | 9.38 |
| 25–29 | 95,944 | 87,195 | 183,139 | 8.56 |
| 30–34 | 83,826 | 75,930 | 159,756 | 7.47 |
| 35–39 | 73,299 | 66,059 | 139,358 | 6.51 |
| 40–44 | 70,604 | 65,172 | 135,776 | 6.34 |
| 45–49 | 59,350 | 54,040 | 113,390 | 5.30 |
| 50–54 | 59,573 | 56,469 | 116,042 | 5.42 |
| 55–59 | 47,308 | 42,801 | 90,109 | 4.21 |
| 60–64 | 45,303 | 46,044 | 91,347 | 4.27 |
| 65–69 | 35,218 | 35,780 | 70,998 | 3.31 |
| 70–74 | 24,591 | 28,406 | 52,997 | 2.48 |
| 75–79 | 17,525 | 22,716 | 40,241 | 1.88 |
| 80–84 | 9,158 | 13,498 | 22,656 | 1.06 |
| 85–89 | 4,150 | 6,622 | 10,772 | 0.50 |
| 90+ | 1,952 | 4,193 | 6,145 | 0.29 |

| Age group | Male | Female | Total | Percent |
|---|---|---|---|---|
| 0–14 | 267,088 | 254,677 | 521,765 | 24.38 |
| 15–64 | 731,384 | 683,274 | 1,414,658 | 66.10 |
| 65+ | 92,594 | 111,215 | 203,809 | 9.52 |

Structure of the population (31.12.2025):

| Age group | Male | Female | Total | Percent |
|---|---|---|---|---|
| Total | 1,076,328 | 1,038,953 | 2,115,281 | 100 |
| 0–4 | 72,720 | 68,497 | 141,217 | 6.68 |
| 5–9 | 89,495 | 85,997 | 175,492 | 8.30 |
| 10–14 | 95,325 | 90,499 | 185,824 | 8.78 |
| 15–19 | 92,497 | 90,673 | 183,170 | 8.66 |
| 20–24 | 97,249 | 93,813 | 191,062 | 9.03 |
| 25–29 | 92,030 | 86,285 | 178,315 | 8.43 |
| 30–34 | 83,394 | 76,849 | 160,243 | 7.58 |
| 35–39 | 73,110 | 65,867 | 138,977 | 6.57 |
| 40–44 | 69,402 | 62,767 | 132,169 | 6.25 |
| 45–49 | 62,969 | 58,259 | 121,228 | 5.73 |
| 50–54 | 59,023 | 55,935 | 114,958 | 5.43 |
| 55–59 | 44,764 | 39,901 | 84,665 | 4.00 |
| 60–64 | 48,430 | 48,843 | 97,273 | 4.60 |
| 65–69 | 34,221 | 34,119 | 68,340 | 3.23 |
| 70–74 | 27,118 | 31,320 | 58,438 | 2.76 |
| 75–79 | 18,477 | 23,818 | 42,295 | 2.00 |
| 80–84 | 9,926 | 14,273 | 24,199 | 1.14 |
| 85–89 | 4,353 | 7,235 | 11,588 | 0.55 |
| 90+ | 1,825 | 4,003 | 5,828 | 0.28 |

| Age group | Male | Female | Total | Percent |
|---|---|---|---|---|
| 0–14 | 257,540 | 244,993 | 502,533 | 23.76 |
| 15–64 | 722,868 | 679,192 | 1,402,060 | 66.28 |
| 65+ | 95,920 | 114,768 | 210,688 | 9.96 |

== Internal immigration ==
Between December 31, 2024 and December 31, 2025
| Region | Population | Immigrants | Emigrants | Net immigrants | Net immigration rate |
|---|---|---|---|---|---|
| Northeast Anatolia | 2,115,281 | 65,450 | 99,745 | -34,295 | -16.08 |

=== State register location of Northeast Anatolia residents ===
As of December 31, 2025
| Region | Population | Percentage |
|---|---|---|
| Istanbul | 3,397 | 0.2 |
| West Marmara | 4,053 | 0.2 |
| Aegean | 13,394 | 0.6 |
| East Marmara | 7,626 | 0.4 |
| West Anatolia | 10,132 | 0.5 |
| Mediterranean | 24,336 | 1.2 |
| Central Anatolia | 22,138 | 1.0 |
| West Black Sea | 22,650 | 1.1 |
| East Black Sea | 40,737 | 1.9 |
| Northeast Anatolia | 1,876,652 | 88.7 |
| Central East Anatolia | 42,048 | 2.0 |
| Southeast Anatolia | 34,588 | 1.6 |
| Foreign National | 13,530 | 0.6 |
| Total | 2,115,281 | 100 |

== Marital status of 15+ population by gender ==
As of December 31, 2025
| Gender | Never married | % | Married | % | Divorced | % | Spouse died | % | Total |
|---|---|---|---|---|---|---|---|---|---|
| Male | 306,646 | 37.5 | 476,712 | 58.2 | 20,394 | 2.5 | 15,036 | 1.8 | 818,788 |
| Female | 231,747 | 29.2 | 466,802 | 58.8 | 19,435 | 2.4 | 75,976 | 9.6 | 793,960 |
| Total | 538,393 | 33.4 | 943,514 | 58.5 | 39,829 | 2.5 | 91,012 | 5.6 | 1,612,748 |

== Education status of 15+ population by gender ==
As of December 31, 2025
| Gender | Illiterate | % | Literate with no diploma | % | Primary school | % | Primary education | % | Middle school | % | High school | % | College or university | % | Master's degree | % | Doctorate | % | Unknown | % | Total |
|---|---|---|---|---|---|---|---|---|---|---|---|---|---|---|---|---|---|---|---|---|---|
| Male | 9,986 | 1.2 | 20,865 | 2.6 | 115,043 | 14.2 | 65,216 | 8.0 | 192,041 | 23.7 | 251,048 | 30.9 | 131,688 | 16.2 | 17,436 | 2.1 | 4,600 | 0.6 | 3,558 | 0.4 | 811,481 |
| Female | 69,863 | 8.9 | 57,062 | 7.2 | 162,357 | 20.6 | 45,678 | 5.8 | 142,613 | 18.1 | 174,960 | 22.2 | 115,299 | 14.6 | 13,323 | 1.7 | 2,769 | 0.4 | 5,315 | 0.7 | 789,239 |
| All genders | 79,849 | 5.0 | 77,927 | 4.9 | 277,400 | 17.3 | 110,894 | 6.9 | 334,654 | 20.9 | 426,008 | 26.6 | 246,987 | 15.4 | 30,759 | 1.9 | 7,369 | 0.5 | 8,873 | 0.6 | 1,600,720 |

== See also ==
- NUTS of Turkey

== Sources ==
- ESPON Database
