= Mediterranean region (statistical) =

Mediterranean Region Akdeniz Bölgesi
- Region
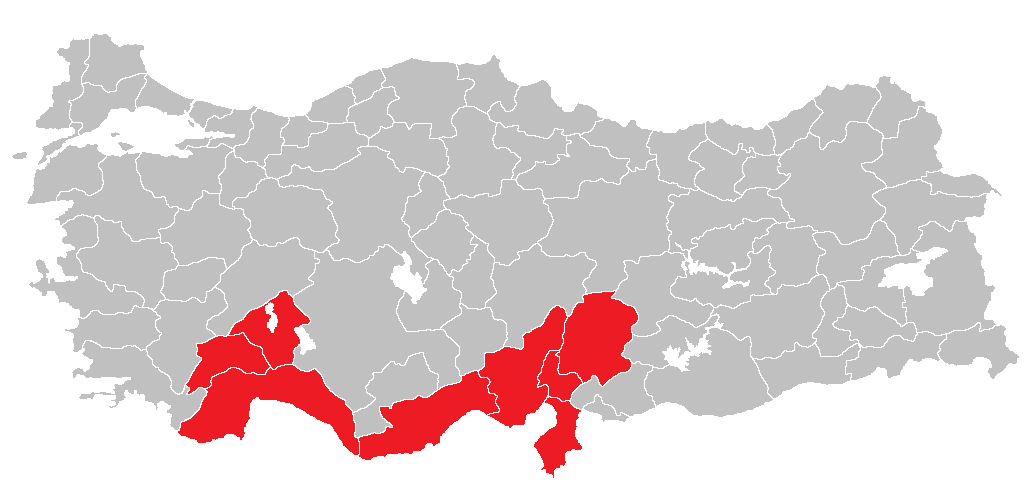
- Country: Turkey

Area
  - Region: 89,983 km^{2} (34,743 sq mi)

Population (2025)
  - Region: 11,028,175
  - Rank: 2nd
  - Density: 122.56/km^{2} (317.42/sq mi)
  - Urban: 9,297,735
  - Rural: 1,730,440
- HDI (2023): 0.842 very high · 6th

The Mediterranean Region (Turkish: Akdeniz Bölgesi) (TR6) is a statistical region in Turkey.

== Subregions and provinces ==
- Antalya Subregion (TR61)
  - Antalya Province (TR611)
  - Isparta Province (TR612)
  - Burdur Province (TR613)
- Adana Subregion (TR62)
  - Adana Province (TR621)
  - Mersin Province (TR622)
- Hatay Subregion (TR63)
  - Hatay Province (TR631)
  - Kahramanmaraş Province (TR632)
  - Osmaniye Province (TR633)

== Population ==
Historical population
Year	Pop.	±% p.a.
1927	1,164,737	—
1935	1,321,617	+1.59%
1940	1,629,312	+4.27%
1945	1,790,428	+1.90%
1950	2,046,402	+2.71%
1955	2,427,431	+3.47%
1960	2,874,388	+3.44%
1965	3,306,662	+2.84%
1970	3,834,064	+3.00%
1975	4,555,823	+3.51%
1980	5,257,808	+2.91%
1985	6,124,744	+3.10%
1990	7,026,489	+2.79%
1997	8,058,311	+1.98%
2000	8,706,005	+2.61%
2007	8,906,427	+0.33%
2008	9,050,691	+1.62%
2009	9,252,902	+2.23%
2010	9,423,231	+1.84%
2011	9,495,788	+0.77%
2012	9,611,007	+1.21%
2013	9,766,093	+1.61%
2014	9,906,771	+1.44%
2015	10,039,939	+1.34%
2016	10,182,776	+1.42%
2017	10,303,984	+1.19%
2018	10,461,409	+1.53%
2019	10,627,530	+1.59%
2020	10,759,218	+1.24%
2021	10,888,766	+1.20%
2022	11,020,550	+1.21%
2023	10,851,089	−1.54%
2024	10,936,452	+0.79%
2025	11,028,175	+0.84%

=== Structure of the population ===
Structure of the population

Structure of the population (31.12.2024):

Age group	Male	Female	Total	Percent
Total	5,500,965	5,435,487	10,936,452	100
0–4	334,580	317,606	652,186	5.96
5–9	434,245	411,540	845,785	7.74
10–14	450,701	425,491	876,192	8.01
15–19	438,017	408,554	846,571	7.74
20–24	393,451	366,124	759,575	6.94
25–29	403,577	385,591	789,168	7.22
30–34	380,519	376,979	757,498	6.93
35–39	397,878	394,691	792,569	7.25
40–44	423,621	415,661	839,282	7.67
45–49	390,265	381,330	771,595	7.06
50–54	359,550	360,304	719,854	6.58
55–59	302,830	297,494	600,324	5.49
60–64	272,376	279,166	551,542	5.04
65–69	207,585	218,346	425,931	3.89
70–74	145,234	164,498	309,732	2.83
75–79	90,328	115,046	205,374	1.88
80–84	45,452	64,389	109,841	1.00
85–89	21,235	34,329	55,564	0.51
90+	9,521	18,348	27,869	0.26

Age group	Male	Female	Total	Percent
0–14	1,219,526	1,154,637	2,374,163	21.71
15–64	3,762,084	3,665,894	7,427,978	67.92
65+	519,355	614,956	1,134,311	10.37

Structure of the population (31.12.2025):

Age group	Male	Female	Total	Percent
Total	5,540,574	5,487,601	11,028,175	100
0–4	322,228	304,540	626,768	5.68
5–9	417,697	396,349	814,046	7.38
10–14	456,130	430,946	887,076	8.04
15–19	441,483	412,646	854,129	7.74
20–24	390,356	365,954	756,310	6.86
25–29	413,376	394,477	807,853	7.33
30–34	383,859	379,286	763,145	6.92
35–39	393,974	392,287	786,261	7.13
40–44	418,056	411,985	830,041	7.53
45–49	406,788	400,620	807,408	7.32
50–54	361,290	362,018	723,308	6.56
55–59	299,072	293,294	592,366	5.37
60–64	286,272	292,032	578,304	5.24
65–69	210,680	221,721	432,401	3.92
70–74	160,482	182,260	342,742	3.11
75–79	97,704	123,211	220,915	2.00
80–84	48,657	68,284	116,941	1.06
85–89	22,951	36,945	59,896	0.54
90+	9,519	18,746	28,265	0.26

Age group	Male	Female	Total	Percent
0–14	1,196,055	1,131,835	2,327,890	21.11
15–64	3,794,526	3,704,599	7,499,125	68.00
65+	549,993	651,167	1,201,160	10.89

== Internal immigration ==
Between December 31, 2024 and December 31, 2025
Region	Population	Immigrants	Emigrants	Net immigrants	Net immigration rate
Mediterranean	11,028,175	249,138	214,578	34,560	3.14

=== State register location of Mediterranean residents ===
As of December 31, 2025
Region	Population	Percentage
Istanbul	48,240	0.4
West Marmara	33,025	0.3
Aegean	200,381	1.8
East Marmara	73,370	0.7
West Anatolia	238,107	2.1
Mediterranean	7,706,259	69.9
Central Anatolia	350,661	3.2
West Black Sea	166,789	1.5
East Black Sea	88,185	0.8
Northeast Anatolia	131,556	1.2
Central East Anatolia	486,081	4.4
Southeast Anatolia	1,296,872	11.8
Foreign National	208,649	1.9
Total	11,028,175	100

== Marital status of 15+ population by gender ==
As of December 31, 2025
Gender	Never married	%	Married	%	Divorced	%	Spouse died	%	Total
Male	1,411,218	32.5	2,635,009	60.7	228,470	5.3	69,822	1.6	4,344,519
Female	1,058,770	24.3	2,619,532	60.1	280,696	6.4	396,768	9.1	4,355,766
Total	2,469,988	28.4	5,254,541	60.4	509,166	5.9	466,590	5.4	8,700,285

== Education status of 15+ population by gender ==
As of December 31, 2025
Gender	Illiterate	%	Literate with no diploma	%	Primary school	%	Primary education	%	Middle school	%	High school	%	College or university	%	Master's degree	%	Doctorate	%	Unknown	%	Total
Male	23,675	0.6	60,524	1.4	601,605	14.1	365,063	8.6	892,726	21.0	1,345,336	31.6	825,866	19.4	97,262	2.3	15,260	0.4	33,301	0.8	4,260,618
Female	146,351	3.4	222,764	5.2	903,319	21.2	273,533	6.4	722,697	17.0	1,054,828	24.8	797,323	18.7	85,288	2.0	11,363	0.3	37,377	0.9	4,254,843
All genders	170,026	2.0	283,288	3.3	1,504,924	17.7	638,596	7.5	1,615,423	19.0	2,400,164	28.2	1,623,189	19.1	182,550	2.1	26,623	0.3	70,678	0.8	8,515,461

== See also ==
- NUTS of Turkey

== Sources ==
- ESPON Database
