= Manisa Subregion =

Manisa Subregion Manisa Alt Bölgesi
- Subregion
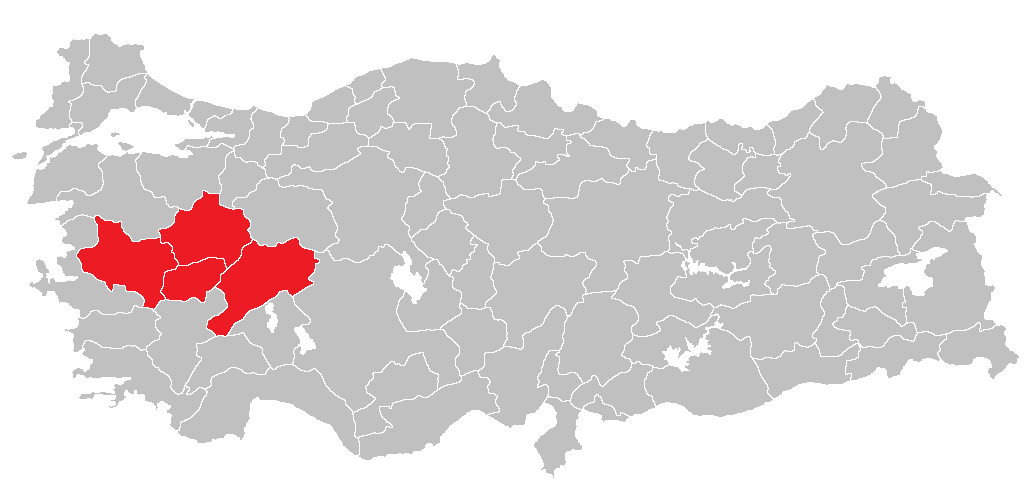
- Country: Turkey
- Region: Aegean

Area
  - Subregion: 45,270 km^{2} (17,480 sq mi)

Population (2013)
  - Subregion: 2,985,153
  - Rank: 9th
  - Density: 65.94/km^{2} (170.8/sq mi)
  - Urban: 2,376,773
  - Rural: 608,380

The Manisa Subregion (Turkish: Manisa Alt Bölgesi) (TR33) is a statistical subregion in Turkey.

== Provinces ==
- Manisa Province (TR331)
- Afyonkarahisar Province (TR332)
- Kütahya Province (TR333)
- Uşak Province (TR334)

== See also ==
- NUTS of Turkey

== Sources ==
- ESPON Database
