= West Anatolia region (statistical) =

West Anatolia Region Batı Anadolu Bölgesi
- Region
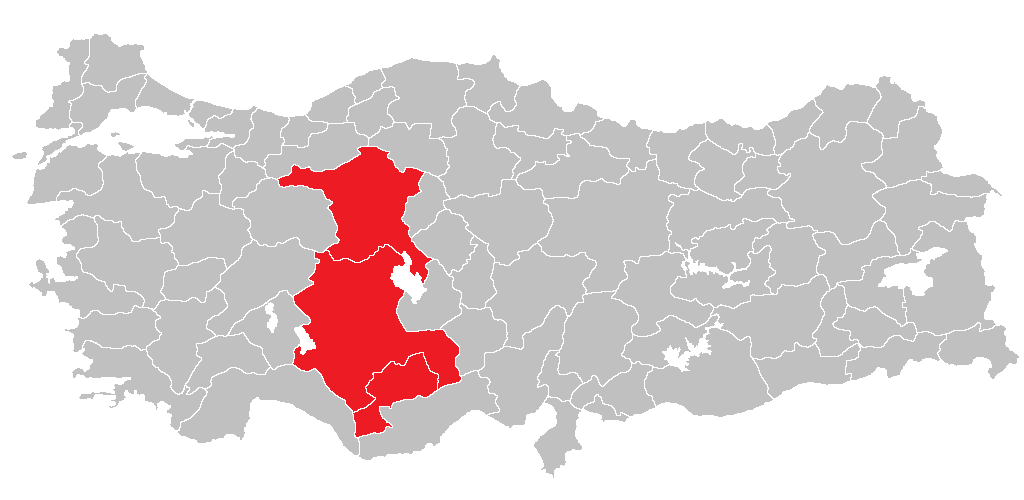
- Country: Turkey

Area
  - Region: 73,126 km^{2} (28,234 sq mi)

Population (2025)
  - Region: 8,516,084
  - Rank: 6th
  - Density: 116.46/km^{2} (301.62/sq mi)
  - Urban: 7,717,848
  - Rural: 798,236
- HDI (2023): 0.869 very high · 2nd

The West Anatolia Region (Turkish: Batı Anadolu Bölgesi) (TR5) is a statistical region in Turkey. Its largest city is Ankara, which serves as the national capital.

== Subregions and provinces ==
- Ankara Subregion (TR51)
  - Ankara Province (TR510)
- Konya Subregion (TR52)
  - Konya Province (TR521)
  - Karaman Province (TR522)

== Population ==
Historical population
Year	Pop.	±% p.a.
1927	909,104	—
1935	1,103,709	+2.45%
1940	1,223,901	+2.09%
1945	1,357,403	+2.09%
1950	1,560,719	+2.83%
1955	1,968,687	+4.75%
1960	2,303,802	+3.19%
1965	2,766,924	+3.73%
1970	3,321,897	+3.72%
1975	4,007,754	+3.83%
1980	4,416,828	+1.96%
1985	5,075,377	+2.82%
1990	5,204,465	+0.50%
1997	5,849,466	+1.68%
2000	6,443,236	+3.28%
2007	6,651,887	+0.46%
2008	6,748,952	+1.46%
2009	6,875,349	+1.87%
2010	7,018,194	+2.08%
2011	7,163,453	+2.07%
2012	7,253,247	+1.25%
2013	7,362,247	+1.50%
2014	7,499,242	+1.86%
2015	7,643,315	+1.92%
2016	7,753,431	+1.44%
2017	7,871,847	+1.53%
2018	7,961,507	+1.14%
2019	8,124,729	+2.05%
2020	8,168,261	+0.54%
2021	8,283,180	+1.41%
2022	8,339,470	+0.68%
2023	8,387,683	+0.58%
2024	8,456,864	+0.82%
2025	8,516,084	+0.70%

=== Structure of the population ===
Structure of the population

Structure of the population (31.12.2024):

Age group	Male	Female	Total	Percent
Total	4,175,989	4,280,875	8,456,864	100
0–4	232,436	221,305	453,741	5.37
5–9	301,361	286,654	588,015	6.95
10–14	309,781	294,050	603,831	7.14
15–19	318,600	306,462	625,062	7.39
20–24	328,280	320,824	649,104	7.68
25–29	326,230	326,531	652,761	7.72
30–34	308,891	312,800	621,691	7.35
35–39	317,634	323,135	640,769	7.58
40–44	325,866	335,284	661,150	7.82
45–49	299,088	306,502	605,590	7.16
50–54	271,899	283,103	555,002	6.56
55–59	233,155	240,757	473,912	5.60
60–64	208,028	223,570	431,598	5.10
65–69	157,437	172,774	330,211	3.90
70–74	108,426	130,653	239,079	2.83
75–79	69,761	95,981	165,742	1.96
80–84	35,785	55,577	91,362	1.08
85–89	16,006	29,336	45,342	0.54
90+	7,325	15,577	22,902	0.27

Age group	Male	Female	Total	Percent
0–14	843,578	802,009	1,645,587	19.46
15–64	2,937,671	2,978,968	5,916,639	69.96
65+	394,740	499,898	894,638	10.58

Structure of the population (31.12.2025):

Age group	Male	Female	Total	Percent
Total	4,206,608	4,309,476	8,516,084	100
0–4	221,369	211,141	432,510	5.08
5–9	289,518	275,437	564,955	6.63
10–14	311,901	296,844	608,745	7.15
15–19	319,234	306,274	625,508	7.35
20–24	326,123	316,217	642,340	7.54
25–29	335,097	331,799	666,896	7.83
30–34	311,918	314,150	626,068	7.35
35–39	316,418	321,137	637,555	7.49
40–44	323,556	332,405	655,961	7.70
45–49	311,191	319,329	630,520	7.40
50–54	273,347	284,924	558,271	6.56
55–59	231,388	238,228	469,616	5.51
60–64	217,456	233,871	451,327	5.30
65–69	160,758	175,559	336,317	3.95
70–74	118,460	142,455	260,915	3.06
75–79	75,420	103,011	178,431	2.10
80–84	38,856	59,114	97,970	1.15
85–89	17,530	31,956	49,486	0.58
90+	7,068	15,625	22,693	0.27

Age group	Male	Female	Total	Percent
0–14	822,788	783,422	1,606,210	18.86
15–64	2,965,728	2,998,334	5,964,062	70.03
65+	418,092	527,720	945,812	11.11

== Internal immigration ==
Between December 31, 2024 and December 31, 2025
Region	Population	Immigrants	Emigrants	Net immigrants	Net immigration rate
West Anatolia	8,516,084	218,705	190,064	28,641	3.37

=== State register location of West Anatolia residents ===
As of December 31, 2025
Region	Population	Percentage
Istanbul	41,493	0.5
West Marmara	50,175	0.6
Aegean	160,831	1.9
East Marmara	203,320	2.4
West Anatolia	3,922,450	46.1
Mediterranean	332,367	3.9
Central Anatolia	1,384,089	16.2
West Black Sea	1,082,399	12.7
East Black Sea	277,119	3.3
Northeast Anatolia	420,222	4.9
Central East Anatolia	240,461	2.8
Southeast Anatolia	241,763	2.8
Foreign National	159,395	1.9
Total	8,516,084	100

== Marital status of 15+ population by gender ==
As of December 31, 2025
Gender	Never married	%	Married	%	Divorced	%	Spouse died	%	Total
Male	1,076,588	31.8	2,088,319	61.7	168,423	5.0	50,490	1.5	3,383,820
Female	873,261	24.8	2,101,013	59.6	235,171	6.7	316,609	9.0	3,526,054
Total	1,949,849	28.2	4,189,332	60.6	403,594	5.8	367,099	5.3	6,909,874

== Education status of 15+ population by gender ==
As of December 31, 2025
Gender	Illiterate	%	Literate with no diploma	%	Primary school	%	Primary education	%	Middle school	%	High school	%	College or university	%	Master's degree	%	Doctorate	%	Unknown	%	Total
Male	10,010	0.3	21,168	0.6	367,990	11.1	215,128	6.5	594,408	17.9	1,084,191	32.6	842,029	25.4	139,763	4.2	30,573	0.9	15,788	0.5	3,321,048
Female	84,566	2.4	100,275	2.9	692,741	20.0	185,565	5.4	497,660	14.4	908,833	26.3	811,905	23.5	132,964	3.8	25,480	0.7	18,534	0.5	3,458,523
All genders	94,576	1.4	121,443	1.8	1,060,731	15.6	400,693	5.9	1,092,068	16.1	1,993,024	29.4	1,653,934	24.4	272,727	4.0	56,053	0.8	34,322	0.5	6,779,571

== See also ==
- NUTS of Turkey

== Sources ==
- ESPON Database
