= Aegean region (statistical) =

Aegean Region Ege Bölgesi
- Region
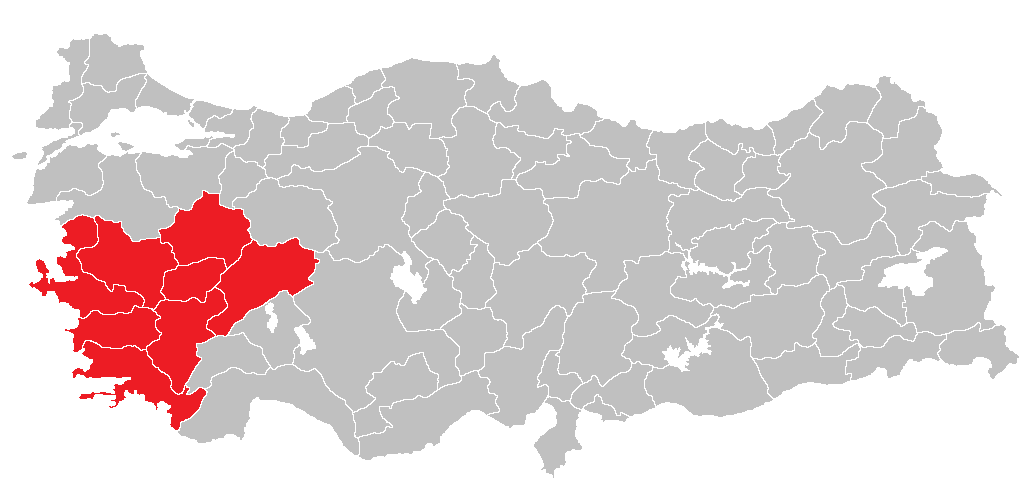
- Country: Turkey

Area
  - Region: 90,456 km^{2} (34,925 sq mi)

Population (2025)
  - Region: 11,011,261
  - Rank: 3rd
  - Density: 121.73/km^{2} (315.28/sq mi)
  - Urban: 8,904,724
  - Rural: 2,106,537
- HDI (2023): 0.853 very high · 5th

The Aegean Region (Turkish: Ege Bölgesi) (TR3) is a statistical region in Turkey.

== Subregions and provinces ==
- İzmir Subregion (TR31)
  - İzmir Province (TR310)
- Aydın Subregion (TR32)
  - Aydın Province (TR321)
  - Denizli Province (TR322)
  - Muğla Province (TR323)
- Manisa Subregion (TR33)
  - Manisa Province (TR331)
  - Afyonkarahisar Province (TR332)
  - Kütahya Province (TR333)
  - Uşak Province (TR334)

== Population ==
Historical population
Year	Pop.	±% p.a.
1927	2,094,800	—
1935	2,413,785	+1.79%
1940	2,550,297	+1.11%
1945	2,697,623	+1.13%
1950	3,001,170	+2.16%
1955	3,425,606	+2.68%
1960	3,924,596	+2.76%
1965	4,397,337	+2.30%
1970	4,867,151	+2.05%
1975	5,397,195	+2.09%
1980	5,954,504	+1.98%
1985	6,746,769	+2.53%
1990	7,595,221	+2.40%
1997	8,452,087	+1.54%
2000	8,938,781	+1.88%
2007	9,299,322	+0.57%
2008	9,384,848	+0.92%
2009	9,517,153	+1.41%
2010	9,693,594	+1.85%
2011	9,687,692	−0.06%
2012	9,779,502	+0.95%
2013	9,897,313	+1.20%
2014	10,023,549	+1.28%
2015	10,138,132	+1.14%
2016	10,265,111	+1.25%
2017	10,383,963	+1.16%
2018	10,514,200	+1.25%
2019	10,618,433	+0.99%
2020	10,689,115	+0.67%
2021	10,784,645	+0.89%
2022	10,886,803	+0.95%
2023	10,946,780	+0.55%
2024	10,974,357	+0.25%
2025	11,011,261	+0.34%

=== Structure of the population ===
Structure of the population

Structure of the population (31.12.2024):

Age group	Male	Female	Total	Percent
Total	5,460,386	5,513,971	10,974,357	100
0–4	272,261	258,228	530,489	4.83
5–9	351,022	333,019	684,041	6.23
10–14	363,216	344,153	707,369	6.45
15–19	368,622	348,402	717,024	6.53
20–24	369,515	352,963	722,478	6.58
25–29	393,033	368,714	761,747	6.94
30–34	383,151	371,609	754,760	6.88
35–39	401,735	398,062	799,797	7.29
40–44	436,453	434,315	870,768	7.93
45–49	413,039	410,584	823,623	7.51
50–54	379,640	386,101	765,741	6.98
55–59	338,941	344,771	683,712	6.23
60–64	319,865	335,954	655,819	5.98
65–69	258,728	280,027	538,755	4.91
70–74	186,707	217,684	404,391	3.68
75–79	119,794	157,644	277,438	2.53
80–84	63,268	94,256	157,524	1.44
85–89	29,617	50,990	80,607	0.73
90+	11,779	26,495	38,274	0.35

Age group	Male	Female	Total	Percent
0–14	986,499	935,400	1,921,899	17.51
15–64	3,803,994	3,751,475	7,555,469	68.85
65+	669,893	827,096	1,496,989	13.64

Structure of the population (31.12.2025):

Age group	Male	Female	Total	Percent
Total	5,478,332	5,532,929	11,011,261	100
0–4	258,702	245,610	504,312	4.58
5–9	336,944	319,695	656,639	5.96
10–14	367,814	348,005	715,819	6.50
15–19	366,493	346,864	713,357	6.48
20–24	366,455	346,721	713,176	6.48
25–29	396,248	370,998	767,246	6.97
30–34	382,493	369,809	752,302	6.83
35–39	399,366	393,624	792,990	7.20
40–44	427,560	425,494	853,054	7.75
45–49	427,039	425,963	853,002	7.75
50–54	383,543	389,101	772,644	7.02
55–59	336,842	342,707	679,549	6.17
60–64	325,123	341,817	666,940	6.05
65–69	262,504	283,286	545,790	4.96
70–74	202,320	236,120	438,440	3.98
75–79	127,633	166,795	294,428	2.67
80–84	67,537	99,352	166,889	1.52
85–89	31,863	54,207	86,070	0.78
90+	11,853	26,761	38,614	0.35

Age group	Male	Female	Total	Percent
0–14	963,460	913,310	1,876,770	17.04
15–64	3,811,162	3.753,098	7.564,260	68.70
65+	703,710	866,521	1,570,231	14.26

== Internal immigration ==
Between December 31, 2024 and December 31, 2025
Region	Population	Immigrants	Emigrants	Net immigrants	Net immigration rate
Aegean	11,011,261	210,768	192,545	18,223	1.66

=== State register location of Aegean residents ===
As of December 31, 2025
Region	Population	Percentage
Istanbul	103,055	0.9
West Marmara	212,951	1.9
Aegean	7,115,840	64.6
East Marmara	160,299	1.5
West Anatolia	300,199	2.7
Mediterranean	347,210	3.2
Central Anatolia	368,413	3.4
West Black Sea	321,185	2.9
East Black Sea	189,236	1.7
Northeast Anatolia	636,267	5.8
Central East Anatolia	500,180	4.5
Southeast Anatolia	627,451	5.7
Foreign National	128,975	1.2
Total	11,011,261	100

== Marital status of 15+ population by gender ==
As of December 31, 2025
Gender	Never married	%	Married	%	Divorced	%	Spouse died	%	Total
Male	1,335,574	29.6	2,796,278	61.9	293,674	6.5	89,346	2.0	4,514,872
Female	958,300	20.7	2,785,451	60.3	351,331	7.6	524,537	11.4	4,619,619
Total	2,293,874	25.1	5,581,729	61.1	645,005	7.1	613,883	6.7	9,134,491

== Education status of 15+ population by gender ==
As of December 31, 2025
Gender	Illiterate	%	Literate with no diploma	%	Primary school	%	Primary education	%	Middle school	%	High school	%	College or university	%	Master's degree	%	Doctorate	%	Unknown	%	Total
Male	14,556	0.3	50,183	1.1	724,430	16.2	389,880	8.7	835,315	18.7	1,379,908	30.9	915,420	20.5	107,881	2.4	20,785	0.5	22,559	0.5	4,460,917
Female	91,952	2.0	194,152	4.3	1,112,906	24.4	302,976	6.7	671,902	14.8	1,114,668	24.5	914,482	20.1	107,090	2.4	17,678	0.4	26,654	0.6	4,554,460
All genders	106,508	1.2	244,335	2.7	1,837,336	20.4	692,856	7.7	1,507,217	16.7	2,494,576	27.7	1,829,902	20.3	214,971	2.4	38,463	0.4	49,213	0.5	9,015,377

== See also ==
- NUTS of Turkey

== Sources ==
- ESPON Database
