= West Marmara region (statistical) =

West Marmara Region Batı Marmara Bölgesi
- Region
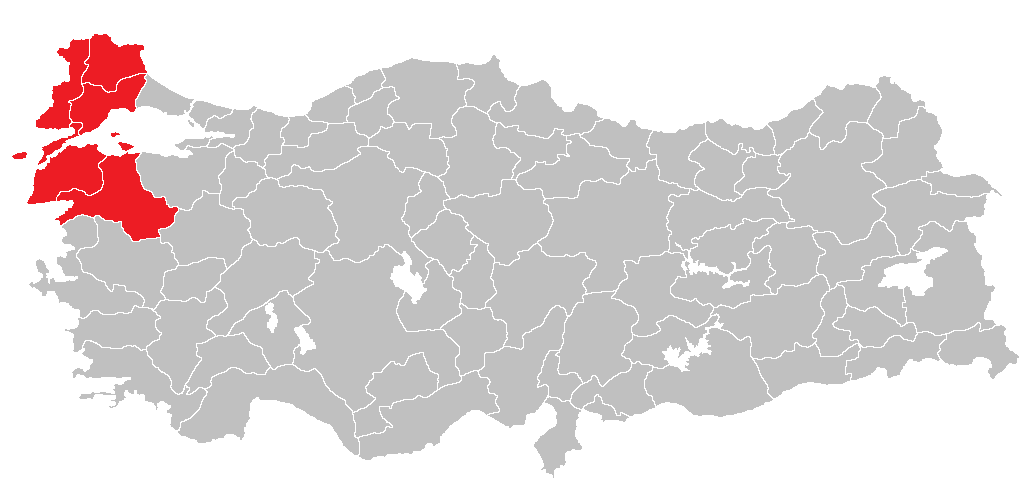
- Country: Turkey

Area
  - Region: 41,280 km^{2} (15,940 sq mi)

Population (2025)
  - Region: 3,868,967
  - Rank: 10th
  - Density: 93.72/km^{2} (242.7/sq mi)
  - Urban: 3,060,819
  - Rural: 808,148
- HDI (2023): 0.856 very high · 4th

The West Marmara Region (Turkish: Batı Marmara) (TR2) is a statistical region in Turkey.

== Subregions and provinces ==
- Tekirdağ Subregion (TR21)
  - Tekirdağ Province (TR211)
  - Edirne Province (TR212)
  - Kırklareli Province (TR213)
- Balıkesir Subregion (TR22)
  - Balıkesir Province (TR221)
  - Çanakkale Province (TR222)

== Population ==
Historical population
Year	Pop.	±% p.a.
1927	994,076	—
1935	1,255,953	+2.97%
1940	1,505,029	+3.68%
1945	1,421,082	−1.14%
1950	1,490,115	+0.95%
1955	1,649,586	+2.05%
1960	1,800,710	+1.77%
1965	1,907,660	+1.16%
1970	1,986,935	+0.82%
1975	2,087,758	+0.99%
1980	2,252,181	+1.53%
1985	2,416,860	+1.42%
1990	2,588,530	+1.38%
1997	2,764,180	+0.94%
2000	2,895,980	+1.56%
2007	3,052,555	+0.76%
2008	3,107,425	+1.80%
2009	3,129,772	+0.72%
2010	3,164,048	+1.10%
2011	3,210,147	+1.46%
2012	3,247,669	+1.17%
2013	3,278,705	+0.96%
2014	3,351,582	+2.22%
2015	3,387,449	+1.07%
2016	3,442,229	+1.62%
2017	3,503,609	+1.78%
2018	3,569,552	+1.88%
2019	3,601,928	+0.91%
2020	3,632,398	+0.85%
2021	3,699,764	+1.85%
2022	3,743,485	+1.18%
2023	3,808,146	+1.73%
2024	3,832,502	+0.64%
2025	3,868,967	+0.95%

=== Structure of the population ===
Structure of the population

Structure of the population (31.12.2024):

Age group	Male	Female	Total	Percent
Total	1,924,482	1,908,020	3,832,502	100
0–4	92,612	87,871	180,483	4.71
5–9	116,764	110,544	227,308	5.93
10–14	118,635	111,762	230,397	6.01
15–19	120,959	114,536	235,495	6.15
20–24	131,929	119,604	251,533	6.56
25–29	139,478	126,082	265,560	6.93
30–34	138,102	126,803	264,905	6.91
35–39	139,690	132,898	272,588	7.11
40–44	151,274	144,962	296,236	7.73
45–49	143,286	136,603	279,889	7.30
50–54	131,909	131,956	263,865	6.89
55–59	122,612	124,209	246,821	6.44
60–64	116,828	124,744	241,572	6.30
65–69	99,589	108,620	208,209	5.43
70–74	73,686	84,106	157,792	4.12
75–79	46,587	58,712	105,299	2.75
80–84	24,528	35,356	59,884	1.56
85–89	11,548	19,349	30,897	0.81
90+	4,466	9,303	13,769	0.36

Age group	Male	Female	Total	Percent
0–14	328,011	310,177	638,188	16.65
15–64	1,336,067	1,282,397	2,618,464	68.32
65+	260,404	315,446	575,850	15.03

Structure of the population (31.12.2025):

Age group	Male	Female	Total	Percent
Total	1,943,367	1,925,600	3,868,967	100
0–4	88,823	84,925	173,748	4.49
5–9	114,015	107,917	221,932	5.74
10–14	120,928	113,831	234,759	6.06
15–19	121,362	114,489	235,851	6.09
20–24	131,961	118,387	250,348	6.47
25–29	141,142	127,302	268,444	6.94
30–34	139,374	127,468	266,842	6.90
35–39	141,369	132,369	273,738	7.08
40–44	148,474	143,082	291,556	7.54
45–49	148,649	141,634	290,283	7.50
50–54	133,295	133,491	266,786	6.90
55–59	121,881	122,616	244,497	6.32
60–64	118,244	126,415	244,659	6.32
65–69	101,319	111,192	212,511	5.49
70–74	79,256	90,531	169,787	4.39
75–79	50,095	62,915	113,010	2.92
80–84	26,295	37,351	63,646	1.64
85–89	12,370	20,365	32,735	0.85
90+	4,515	9,320	13,835	0.36

Age group	Male	Female	Total	Percent
0–14	323,766	306,673	630,439	16.29
15–64	1,345,751	1,287,253	2,633,004	68.06
65+	273,850	331,674	605,524	15.65

|}

== Internal immigration ==
Between December 31, 2024 and December 31, 2025
Region	Population	Immigrants	Emigrants	Net immigrants	Net immigration rate
West Marmara	3,868,967	130,489	101,691	28,798	7.47

=== State register location of West Marmara residents ===
As of December 31, 2025
Region	Population	Percentage
Istanbul	120,795	3.1
West Marmara	2,360,931	61.0
Aegean	96,410	2.5
East Marmara	83,333	2.2
West Anatolia	46,465	1.2
Mediterranean	83,215	2.2
Central Anatolia	129,572	3.3
West Black Sea	274,920	7.1
East Black Sea	128,161	3.3
Northeast Anatolia	213,391	5.5
Central East Anatolia	176,022	4.5
Southeast Anatolia	114,599	3.0
Foreign National	41,153	1.1
Total	3,868,967	100

== Marital status of 15+ population by gender ==
As of December 31, 2025
Gender	Never married	%	Married	%	Divorced	%	Spouse died	%	Total
Male	465,612	28.7	1,021,373	63.1	93,237	5.8	39,379	2.4	1,619,601
Female	305,818	18.9	1,008,029	62.3	100,103	6.2	204,977	12.7	1,618,927
Total	771,430	23.8	2,029,402	62.7	193,340	6.0	244,356	7.5	3,238,528

== Education status of 15+ population by gender ==
As of December 31, 2025
Gender	Illiterate	%	Literate with no diploma	%	Primary school	%	Primary education	%	Middle school	%	High school	%	College or university	%	Master's degree	%	Doctorate	%	Unknown	%	Total
Male	6,516	0.4	19,219	1.2	271,494	17.0	135,638	8.5	287,004	17.9	511,858	32.0	319,431	20.0	34,936	2.2	6,354	0.4	7,317	0.5	1,599,767
Female	32,168	2.0	56,263	3.5	425,284	26.6	113,864	7.1	233,588	14.6	391,491	24.5	300,684	18.8	32,862	2.1	4,910	0.3	9,361	0.6	1,600,475
All genders	38,684	1.2	75,482	2.4	696,778	21.8	249,502	7.8	520,592	16.3	903,349	28.2	620,115	19.4	67,798	2.1	11,264	0.4	16,678	0.5	3,200,242

== See also ==
- NUTS of Turkey

== Sources ==
- ESPON Database
