= Van Subregion =

Van Subregion Van Alt Bölgesi
- Subregion
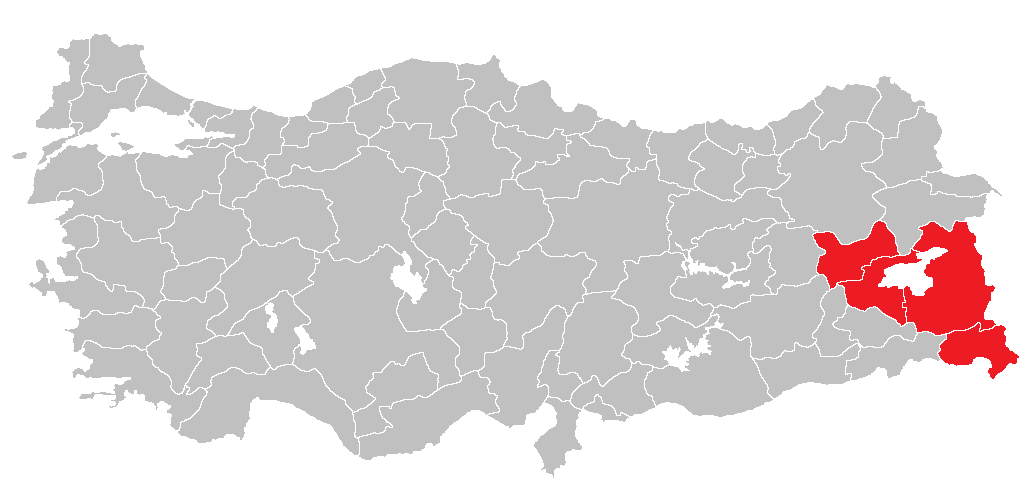
- Country: Turkey
- Region: Central East Anatolia

Area
  - Subregion: 41,093 km^{2} (15,866 sq mi)

Population (2013)
  - Subregion: 2,092,863
  - Rank: 17th
  - Density: 50.930/km^{2} (131.91/sq mi)
  - Urban: 1,560,195
  - Rural: 532,668

The Van Subregion (Turkish: Van Alt Bölgesi) (TRB2) is a statistical subregion in Turkey.

== Provinces ==
- Van Province (TRB21)
- Muş Province (TRB22)
- Bitlis Province (TRB23)
- Hakkâri Province (TRB24)

== See also ==
- NUTS of Turkey

== Sources ==
- ESPON Database
