= East Black Sea region (statistical) =

East Black Sea Region Doğu Karadeniz Bölgesi
- Region
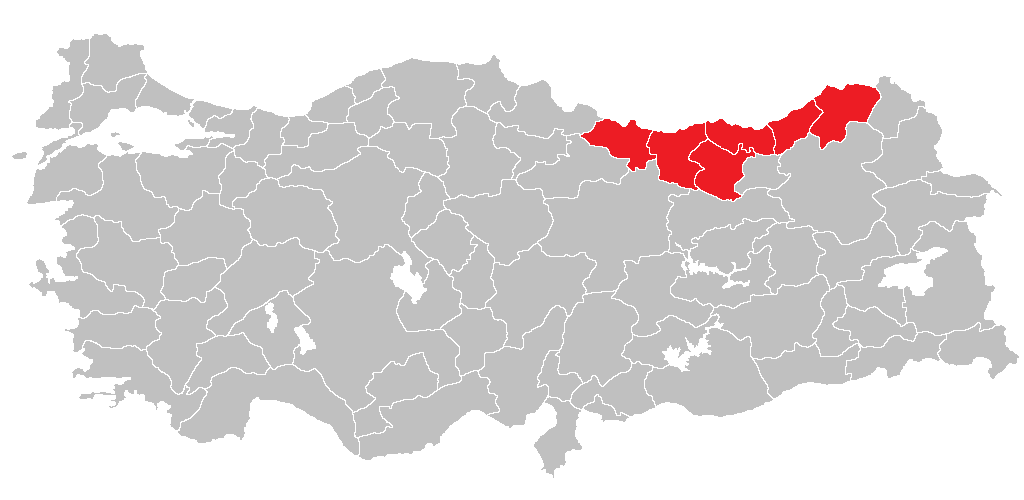
- Country: Turkey

Area
  - Region: 37,551 km^{2} (14,499 sq mi)

Population (2025)
  - Region: 2,699,769
  - Rank: 11th
  - Density: 71.896/km^{2} (186.21/sq mi)
  - Urban: 1,686,792
  - Rural: 1,012,977
- HDI (2023): 0.826 very high · 8th

The East Black Sea Region (Turkish: Doğu Karadeniz Bölgesi) (TR9) is a statistical region in Turkey.

== Subregion and provinces ==
- Trabzon Subregion (TR90)
  - Trabzon Province (TR901)
  - Ordu Province (TR902)
  - Giresun Province (TR903)
  - Rize Province (TR904)
  - Artvin Province (TR905)
  - Gümüşhane Province (TR906)

== Population ==
Historical population
Year	Pop.	±% p.a.
1927	1,150,379	—
1935	1,338,454	+1.91%
1940	1,482,313	+2.06%
1945	1,533,405	+0.68%
1950	1,653,345	+1.52%
1955	1,804,608	+1.77%
1960	2,072,177	+2.80%
1965	2,321,555	+2.30%
1970	2,543,327	+1.84%
1975	2,704,862	+1.24%
1980	2,790,109	+0.62%
1985	2,936,499	+1.03%
1990	2,856,025	−0.55%
1997	2,811,470	−0.22%
2000	3,131,546	+3.66%
2007	2,488,652	−3.23%
2008	2,507,387	+0.75%
2009	2,526,619	+0.77%
2010	2,516,167	−0.41%
2011	2,513,021	−0.13%
2012	2,545,274	+1.28%
2013	2,553,647	+0.33%
2014	2,566,840	+0.52%
2015	2,572,850	+0.23%
2016	2,645,584	+2.83%
2017	2,633,417	−0.46%
2018	2,719,113	+3.25%
2019	2,690,180	−1.06%
2020	2,677,584	−0.47%
2021	2,693,034	+0.58%
2022	2,690,038	−0.11%
2023	2,733,265	+1.61%
2024	2,707,777	−0.93%
2025	2,699,769	−0.30%

=== Structure of the population ===
Structure of the population

Structure of the population (31.12.2024):

Age group	Male	Female	Total	Percent
Total	1,350,296	1,357,481	2,707,777	100
0–4	64,756	61,192	125,948	4.65
5–9	82,509	78,142	160,651	5.93
10–14	85,644	81,855	167,499	6.19
15–19	89,310	86,324	175,634	6.49
20–24	89,935	90,376	180,311	6.66
25–29	91,399	88,583	179,982	6.65
30–34	88,512	85,255	173,767	6.42
35–39	91,690	87,532	179,222	6.62
40–44	97,065	92,422	189,487	6.99
45–49	92,738	86,697	179,435	6.63
50–54	94,387	93,334	187,721	6.93
55–59	93,004	87,633	180,637	6.67
60–64	92,695	92,942	185,637	6.85
65–69	78,638	80,068	158,706	5.86
70–74	53,165	58,826	111,991	4.14
75–79	32,693	46,164	78,857	2.91
80–84	18,423	30,215	48,638	1.80
85–89	8,847	17,409	26,256	0.97
90+	4,886	12,512	17,398	0.64

Age group	Male	Female	Total	Percent
0–14	232,909	221,189	454,098	16.77
15–64	920,735	891,098	1,811,833	66.91
65+	196,652	245,194	441,846	16.32

Structure of the population (31.12.2025):

Age group	Male	Female	Total	Percent
Total	1,345,510	1,354,259	2,699,769	100
0–4	61,156	58,136	119,292	4.42
5–9	80,097	75,433	155,530	5.76
10–14	85,315	81,739	167,054	6.19
15–19	89,012	86,406	175,418	6.50
20–24	85,932	86,580	172,512	6.39
25–29	91,366	88,301	179,667	6.65
30–34	87,882	85,335	173,217	6.41
35–39	90,355	86,402	176,757	6.55
40–44	95,800	90,699	186,499	6.91
45–49	95,562	89,898	185,460	6.87
50–54	93,139	91,755	184,894	6.85
55–59	86,916	81,576	168,492	6.24
60–64	96,947	97,762	194,709	7.21
65–69	78,869	77,410	156,279	5.79
70–74	57,684	65,745	123,429	4.57
75–79	35,800	48,907	84,707	3.14
80–84	19,558	31,215	50,773	1.88
85–89	9,533	18,925	28,458	1.05
90+	4,587	12,035	16,622	0.62

Age group	Male	Female	Total	Percent
0–14	226,568	215,308	441,876	16.37
15–64	912,911	884,714	1,797,625	66.58
65+	206,031	254,237	460,268	17.05

== Internal immigration ==
Between December 31, 2024 and December 31, 2025
Region	Population	Immigrants	Emigrants	Net immigrants	Net immigration rate
East Black Sea	2,699,769	77,680	86,321	-8,641	-3.2

=== State register location of East Black Sea residents ===
As of December 31, 2025
Region	Population	Percentage
Istanbul	12,263	0.4
West Marmara	4,931	0.2
Aegean	10,736	0.4
East Marmara	12,397	0.5
West Anatolia	9,623	0.4
Mediterranean	23,966	0.9
Central Anatolia	21,989	0.8
West Black Sea	56,455	2.1
East Black Sea	2,430,035	90.0
Northeast Anatolia	47,699	1.8
Central East Anatolia	20,273	0.7
Southeast Anatolia	22,162	0.8
Foreign National	27,240	1.0
Total	2,699,769	100

== Marital status of 15+ population by gender ==
As of December 31, 2025
Gender	Never married	%	Married	%	Divorced	%	Spouse died	%	Total
Male	335,398	30.0	712,155	63.6	43,887	3.9	27,502	2.5	1,118,942
Female	258,746	22.7	690,291	60.6	41,260	3.6	148,654	13.1	1,138,951
Total	594,144	26.3	1,402,446	62.1	85,147	3.8	176,156	7.8	2,257,893

== Education status of 15+ population by gender ==
As of December 31, 2025
Gender	Illiterate	%	Literate with no diploma	%	Primary school	%	Primary education	%	Middle school	%	High school	%	College or university	%	Master's degree	%	Doctorate	%	Unknown	%	Total
Male	8,682	0.8	18,477	1.7	177,915	16.1	89,995	8.1	195,052	17.6	369,533	33.4	211,567	19.1	23,271	2.1	5,164	0.5	6,921	0.6	1,106,577
Female	64,880	5.8	85,544	7.6	246,649	21.9	71,150	6.3	153,988	13.7	274,816	24.4	198,703	17.6	20,627	1.8	3,501	0.3	7,405	0.7	1,127,263
All genders	73,562	3.3	104,021	4.7	424,564	19.0	161,145	7.2	349,040	15.6	644,349	28.8	410,270	18.4	43,898	2.0	8,665	0.4	14,326	0.6	2,233,840

== See also ==
- NUTS of Turkey

== Sources ==
- ESPON Database
