= Central Anatolia region (statistical) =

Central Anatolia Region Orta Anadolu Bölgesi
- Region
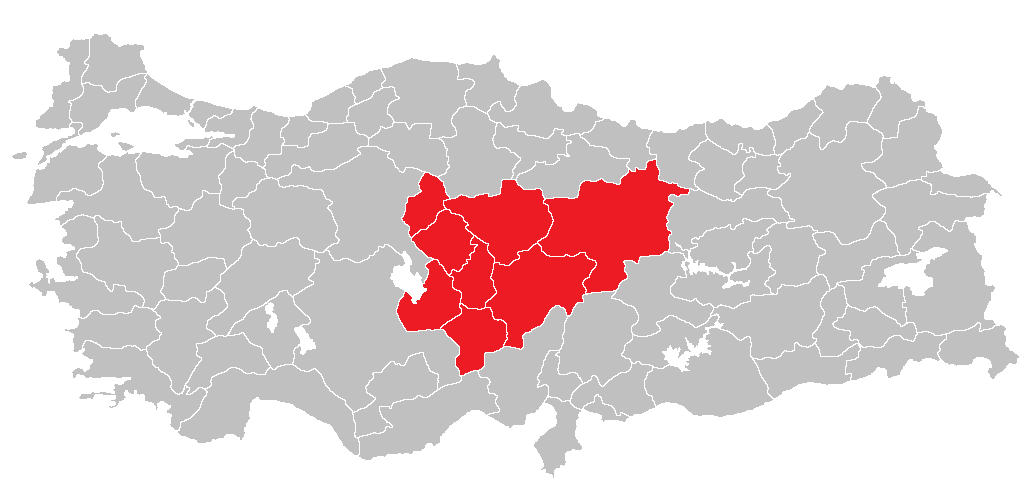
- Country: Turkey

Area
  - Region: 90,868 km^{2} (35,084 sq mi)

Population (2025)
  - Region: 4,164,985
  - Rank: 8th
  - Density: 45.836/km^{2} (118.71/sq mi)
  - Urban: 3,108,484
  - Rural: 1,056,501
- HDI (2023): 0.832 very high · 7th

The Central Anatolia Region (Turkish: Orta Anadolu Bölgesi) (TR7) is a statistical region in Turkey.

== Subregions and provinces ==
- Kırıkkale Subregion (TR71)
  - Kırıkkale Province (TR711)
  - Aksaray Province (TR712)
  - Niğde Province (TR713)
  - Nevşehir Province (TR714)
  - Kırşehir Province (TR715)
- Kayseri Subregion (TR72)
  - Kayseri Province (TR721)
  - Sivas Province (TR722)
  - Yozgat Province (TR723)

== Population ==
Historical population
Year	Pop.	±% p.a.
1927	1,210,406	—
1935	1,398,583	+1.82%
1940	1,512,784	+1.58%
1945	1,602,102	+1.15%
1950	1,783,703	+2.17%
1955	1,929,261	+1.58%
1960	2,238,773	+3.02%
1965	2,441,871	+1.75%
1970	2,648,227	+1.64%
1975	2,864,175	+1.58%
1980	3,042,461	+1.22%
1985	3,280,241	+1.52%
1990	3,818,142	+3.08%
1997	3,821,749	+0.01%
2000	4,189,268	+3.11%
2007	3,776,927	−1.47%
2008	3,792,508	+0.41%
2009	3,831,373	+1.02%
2010	3,849,267	+0.47%
2011	3,843,731	−0.14%
2012	3,853,025	+0.24%
2013	3,873,470	+0.53%
2014	3,886,251	+0.33%
2015	3,894,341	+0.21%
2016	3,948,240	+1.38%
2017	3,977,447	+0.74%
2018	4,064,957	+2.20%
2019	4,075,758	+0.27%
2020	4,088,228	+0.31%
2021	4,108,687	+0.50%
2022	4,124,939	+0.40%
2023	4,181,284	+1.37%
2024	4,160,359	−0.50%
2025	4,164,985	+0.11%

=== Structure of the population ===
Structure of the population

Structure of the population (31.12.2024):

Age group	Male	Female	Total	Percent
Total	2,076,498	2,083,861	4,160,359	100
0–4	118,384	111,858	230,242	5.53
5–9	149,899	142,519	292,418	7.03
10–14	157,734	150,047	307,781	7.40
15–19	167,156	160,720	327,876	7.88
20–24	160,635	162,466	323,101	7.77
25–29	150,117	147,694	297,811	7.16
30–34	138,371	137,510	275,881	6.63
35–39	147,150	143,257	290,407	6.98
40–44	155,078	147,377	302,455	7.27
45–49	140,637	135,377	276,014	6.63
50–54	132,349	132,573	264,922	6.37
55–59	118,803	115,835	234,638	5.64
60–64	109,817	113,890	223,707	5.38
65–69	88,987	92,960	181,947	4.37
70–74	64,028	73,078	137,106	3.30
75–79	42,673	58,013	100,686	2.42
80–84	21,682	33,317	54,999	1.32
85–89	8,626	16,697	25,323	0.61
90+	4,372	8,673	13,045	0.31

Age group	Male	Female	Total	Percent
0–14	426,017	404,424	830,441	19.96
15–64	1,420,113	1,396,699	2,816,812	67.71
65+	230,368	282,738	513,106	12.33

Structure of the population (31.12.2025):

Age group	Male	Female	Total	Percent
Total	2,081,333	2,083,652	4,164,985	100
0–4	112,345	106,064	218,409	5.24
5–9	144,236	136,676	280,912	6.75
10–14	157,703	150,220	307,923	7.39
15–19	164,934	158,976	323,910	7.78
20–24	158,729	158,803	317,532	7.62
25–29	153,919	149,141	303,060	7.28
30–34	139,678	137,506	277,184	6.66
35–39	145,436	141,695	287,131	6.89
40–44	153,727	145,922	299,649	7.19
45–49	146,825	140,790	287,615	6.91
50–54	131,829	131,821	263,650	6.33
55–59	115,535	111,920	227,455	5.46
60–64	115,208	118,936	234,144	5.62
65–69	89,518	93,550	183,068	4.40
70–74	68,911	78,381	147,292	3.54
75–79	45,797	61,271	107,068	2.57
80–84	23,425	35,141	58,566	1.41
85–89	9,592	18,105	27,697	0.66
90+	3,986	8,734	12,720	0.30

Age group	Male	Female	Total	Percent
0–14	414,284	392,960	807,244	19.38
15–64	1,425,820	1,395,510	2,821,330	67.74
65+	241,229	295,182	536,411	12.88

== Internal immigration ==
Between December 31, 2024 and December 31, 2025
Region	Population	Immigrants	Emigrants	Net immigrants	Net immigration rate
Central Anatolia	4,164,985	107,067	116,021	-8,954	-2.15

=== State register location of Central Anatolia residents ===
As of December 31, 2025
Region	Population	Percentage
Istanbul	6.262	0.2
West Marmara	5,576	0.1
Aegean	19,784	0.5
East Marmara	12,458	0.3
West Anatolia	62,782	1.5
Mediterranean	149,506	3.6
Central Anatolia	3,555,276	85.4
West Black Sea	68,158	1.6
East Black Sea	24,075	0.6
Northeast Anatolia	80,331	1.9
Central East Anatolia	47,623	1.1
Southeast Anatolia	61,023	1.5
Foreign National	72,131	1.7
Total	4,164,985	100

== Marital status of 15+ population by gender ==
As of December 31, 2025
Gender	Never married	%	Married	%	Divorced	%	Spouse died	%	Total
Male	510,771	30.6	1,049,746	63.0	74,506	4.5	32,026	1.9	1,667,049
Female	394,112	23.3	1,031,764	61.0	80,993	4.8	183,823	10.9	1,690,692
Total	904,883	26.9	2,081,510	62.0	155,499	4.6	215,849	6.4	3,357,741

== Education status of 15+ population by gender ==
As of December 31, 2025
Gender	Illiterate	%	Literate with no diploma	%	Primary school	%	Primary education	%	Middle school	%	High school	%	College or university	%	Master's degree	%	Doctorate	%	Unknown	%	Total
Male	8,445	0.5	19,724	1.2	232,130	14.2	141,632	8.7	336,727	20.6	540,135	33.0	295,469	18.1	37,616	2.3	7,335	0.4	16,215	1.0	1,635,438
Female	73,825	4.4	75,451	4.5	400,524	24.1	115,993	7.10	272,113	16.3	401,162	24.1	272,882	16.4	31,070	1.9	4,998	0.3	16,651	1.0	1,664,669
All genders	82,270	2.5	95,175	2.9	632,654	19.2	257,625	7.8	608,850	18.5	941,297	28.5	568,351	17.2	68,686	2.1	12,333	0.4	32,866	1.0	3,300,107

== See also ==
- NUTS of Turkey

== Sources ==
- ESPON Database
