= Central East Anatolia region =

Central East Anatolia Region Ortadoğu Anadolu Bölgesi
- Region
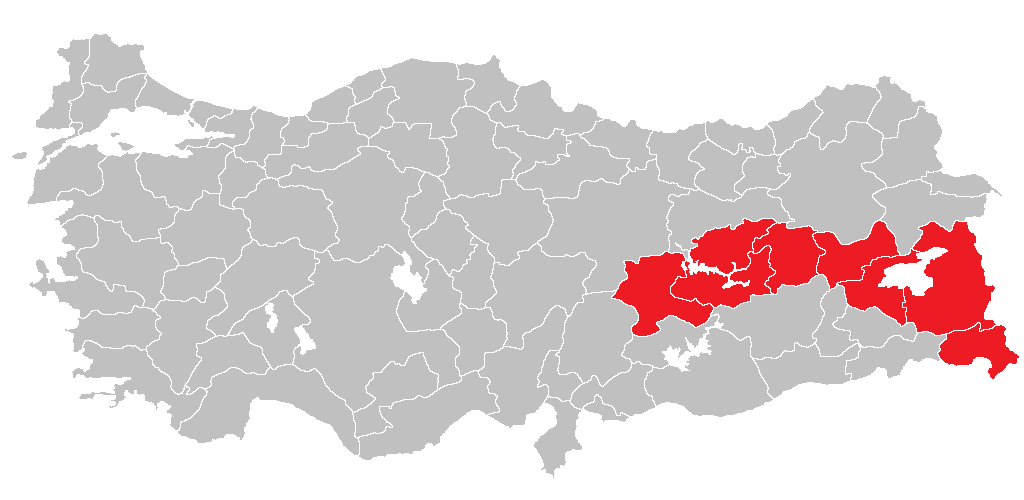
- Country: Turkey

Area
  - Region: 78,458 km^{2} (30,293 sq mi)

Population (2025)
  - Region: 3,870,158
  - Rank: 9th
  - Density: 49.328/km^{2} (127.76/sq mi)
  - Urban: 2,692,511
  - Rural: 1,177,647
- HDI (2023): 0.795 high · 12th

The Central East Anatolia Region (Turkish: Ortadoğu Anadolu Bölgesi) (TRB) is a statistical region in Turkey.

== Subregions and provinces ==
- Malatya Subregion (TRB1)
  - Malatya Province (TRB11)
  - Elazığ Province (TRB12)
  - Bingöl Province (TRB13)
  - Tunceli Province (TRB14)
- Van Subregion (TRB2)
  - Van Province (TRB21)
  - Muş Province (TRB22)
  - Bitlis Province (TRB23)
  - Hakkâri Province (TRB24)

== Population ==
Historical population
Year	Pop.	±% p.a.
1927	711,599	—
1935	953,684	+3.73%
1940	1,065,847	+2.25%
1945	1,110,328	+0.82%
1950	1,286,056	+2.98%
1955	1,297,860	+0.18%
1960	1,519,340	+3.20%
1965	1,783,609	+3.26%
1970	2,070,936	+3.03%
1975	2,365,735	+2.70%
1980	2,618,903	+2.05%
1985	2,913,174	+2.15%
1990	3,100,959	+1.26%
1997	3,398,479	+1.32%
2000	3,727,034	+3.12%
2007	3,558,432	−0.66%
2008	3,618,056	+1.68%
2009	3,638,401	+0.56%
2010	3,647,531	+0.25%
2011	3,709,838	+1.71%
2012	3,756,322	+1.25%
2013	3,774,582	+0.49%
2014	3,801,911	+0.72%
2015	3,824,817	+0.60%
2016	3,827,576	+0.07%
2017	3,854,869	+0.71%
2018	3,929,719	+1.94%
2019	3,930,407	+0.02%
2020	3,951,294	+0.53%
2021	3,940,275	−0.28%
2022	3,928,271	−0.30%
2023	3,896,971	−0.80%
2024	3,876,707	−0.52%
2025	3,870,158	−0.17%

=== Structure of the population ===
Structure of the population

Structure of the population (31.12.2024):

Age group	Male	Female	Total	Percent
Total	1,966,901	1,909,806	3,876,707	100
0–4	148,231	140,850	289,081	7.45
5–9	179,987	170,707	350,694	9.05
10–14	179,679	173,087	352,766	9.10
15–19	177,439	170,441	347,880	8.97
20–24	171,435	159,065	330,500	8.53
25–29	169,714	161,430	331,144	8.54
30–34	159,039	148,582	307,621	7.94
35–39	139,697	131,131	270,828	6.99
40–44	132,412	126,568	258,980	6.68
45–49	107,826	103,267	211,093	5.44
50–54	102,822	101,433	204,255	5.27
55–59	81,921	74,916	156,837	4.04
60–64	75,919	75,147	151,066	3.90
65–69	56,341	57,567	113,908	2.94
70–74	37,831	45,294	83,125	2.15
75–79	24,499	33,821	58,320	1.50
80–84	13,212	19,353	32,565	0.84
85–89	5,924	10,274	16,198	0.42
90+	2,973	6,873	9,846	0.25

Age group	Male	Female	Total	Percent
0–14	507,897	484,644	992,541	25.60
15–64	1,318,224	1,251,980	2,570,204	66.30
65+	140,870	173,182	313,962	8.10

Structure of the population (31.12.2025):

Age group	Male	Female	Total	Percent
Total	1,961,024	1,909,134	3,870,158	100
0–4	140,648	133,585	274,233	7.09
5–9	173,180	164,281	337,461	8.72
10–14	179,168	172,381	351,549	9.08
15–19	175,811	169,450	345,261	8.92
20–24	168,750	156,115	324,865	8.39
25–29	167,237	160,991	328,228	8.48
30–34	158,455	149,431	307,886	7.96
35–39	140,645	132,821	273,466	7.07
40–44	130,669	123,406	254,075	6.56
45–49	115,401	112,379	227,780	5.89
50–54	102,575	101,532	204,107	5.27
55–59	77,893	71,166	149,059	3.85
60–64	82,798	81,126	163,924	4.24
65–69	55,616	55,951	111,567	2.88
70–74	41,997	50,171	92,168	2.38
75–79	26,651	36,038	62,689	1.62
80–84	14,284	20,024	34,308	0.89
85–89	6,465	11,329	17,794	0.46
90+	2,781	6,957	9,738	0.25

Age group	Male	Female	Total	Percent
0–14	492,996	470,247	963,243	24.89
15–64	1,320,234	1,258,417	2,578,651	66.63
65+	147,794	180,470	328,264	8.48

== Internal immigration ==
Between December 31, 2024 and December 31, 2025
Region	Population	Immigrants	Emigrants	Net immigrants	Net immigration rate
Central East Anatolia	3,870,158	109,213	145,686	-36,473	-9.38

=== State register location of Central East Anatolia residents ===
As of December 31, 2025
Region	Population	Percentage
Istanbul	3,476	0.1
West Marmara	5,187	0.1
Aegean	18,820	0.5
East Marmara	8,006	0.2
West Anatolia	12,990	0.3
Mediterranean	50,247	1.3
Central Anatolia	32,121	0.8
West Black Sea	23,569	0.6
East Black Sea	12,295	0.3
Northeast Anatolia	46,190	1.2
Central East Anatolia	3,446,904	89.1
Southeast Anatolia	195,491	5.1
Foreign National	14,862	0.4
Total	3,870,158	100

== Marital status of 15+ population by gender ==
As of December 31, 2025
Gender	Never married	%	Married	%	Divorced	%	Spouse died	%	Total
Male	559,601	38.1	855,502	58.3	30,967	2.1	21,958	1.5	1,468,028
Female	442,452	30.7	845,343	58,7	35,890	2.5	115,202	8.0	1,438,887
Total	1,002,053	34.5	1,700,845	58.5	66,857	2.3	137,160	4.7	2,906,915

== Education status of 15+ population by gender ==
As of December 31, 2025
Gender	Illiterate	%	Literate with no diploma	%	Primary school	%	Primary education	%	Middle school	%	High school	%	College or university	%	Master's degree	%	Doctorate	%	Unknown	%	Total
Male	18,544	1.3	36,453	2.5	159,701	10.9	119,914	8.2	347,932	23.8	481,505	33.0	250,472	17.1	34,613	2.4	6,204	0.4	5,904	0.4	1,461,242
Female	116,550	8.1	125,593	8.8	235,641	16.4	85,077	5.9	287,675	20.0	342,551	23.9	207,624	14.5	22,159	1.5	3,254	0.2	6,921	0.5	1,433,045
All genders	135,094	4.7	162,046	5.6	395,342	13.7	204,991	7.1	635,607	22.0	824,056	28.5	458,096	15.8	56,772	2.0	9,458	0.3	12,825	0.4	2,894,287

== See also ==
- NUTS of Turkey

== Sources ==
- ESPON Database
