= List of Turkish regions by Human Development Index =

Map of the Turkish regions by HDI in 2019. Legend: 0.800 – 1.000 0.700 – 0.799

This is a list of Turkish NUTS1 statistical regions by Human Development Index as of 2025 with data for the year 2023.

Rank	Region	HDI (2025)
Very High Human Development
1	Istanbul	0.886
2	West Anatolia	0.869
3	East Marmara	0.862
4	West Marmara	0.856
5	Aegean	0.853
–	Turkey	0.853
6	Mediterranean	0.842
7	Central Anatolia	0.832
8	East Black Sea	0.826
9	West Black Sea	0.825
10	North East Anatolia	0.807
High Human Development
11	South East Anatolia	0.793
12	Central East Anatolia	0.795

== Province level data ==
On March 24, 2025 Province level HDI data was released for the first time :

Rank	Province	HDI (2025)
Very high human development
1	Ankara	0.930
2	Istanbul	0.925
3	Antalya	0.917
4	İzmir	0.914
5	Eskişehir	0.905
6	Bursa	0.899
7	Muğla	0.890
8	Kocaeli	0.890
9	Yalova	0.886
10	Tekirdağ	0.885
11	Bolu	0.881
12	Kayseri	0.880
13	Bilecik	0.875
14	Kırklareli	0.860
15	Balıkesir	0.857
16	Manisa	0.855
–	Turkey	0.860
17	Çanakkale	0.855
18	Konya	0.853
19	Trabzon	0.853
20	Artvin	0.850
21	Sakarya	0.846
22	Denizli	0.842
23	Isparta	0.842
24	Mersin	0.842
25	Kırıkkale	0.841
26	Samsun	0.841
27	Kırşehir	0.840
28	Zonguldak	0.840
29	Düzce	0.839
30	Edirne	0.838
31	Adana	0.837
32	Aydın	0.837
33	Gaziantep	0.837
34	Karabük	0.836
35	Kütahya	0.834
36	Sivas	0.831
37	Karaman	0.831
38	Elazığ	0.830
39	Erzincan	0.830
40	Nevşehir	0.830
41	Rize	0.830
42	Giresun	0.829
43	Malatya	0.829
44	Amasya	0.828
45	Bayburt	0.828
46	Bartın	0.828
47	Tunceli	0.827
48	Burdur	0.826
49	Ordu	0.825
50	Kastamonu	0.824
51	Kahramanmaraş	0.824
52	Kilis	0.823
53	Osmaniye	0.822
54	Aksaray	0.821
55	Çorum	0.818
56	Uşak	0.818
57	Niğde	0.817
58	Bingöl	0.816
59	Erzurum	0.815
60	Hatay	0.815
61	Sinop	0.815
62	Yozgat	0.812
63	Tokat	0.812
64	Çankırı	0.811
65	Ardahan	0.810
66	Afyonkarahisar	0.809
67	Adıyaman	0.808
68	Mardin	0.807
69	Iğdır	0.807
70	Batman	0.806
71	Gümüşhane	0.803
72	Van	0.798
high human development
73	Kars	0.797
74	Şırnak	0.795
75	Siirt	0.790
76	Diyarbakır	0.765
77	Bitlis	0.745
Medium human development
78	Muş	0.741
79	Hakkari	0.734
80	Şanlıurfa	0.730
81	Ağrı	0.705

== See also ==
- List of countries by Human Development Index
- List of Turkish provinces by GDP
