= Hatay Subregion =

Hatay Subregion Hatay Alt Bölgesi
- Subregion
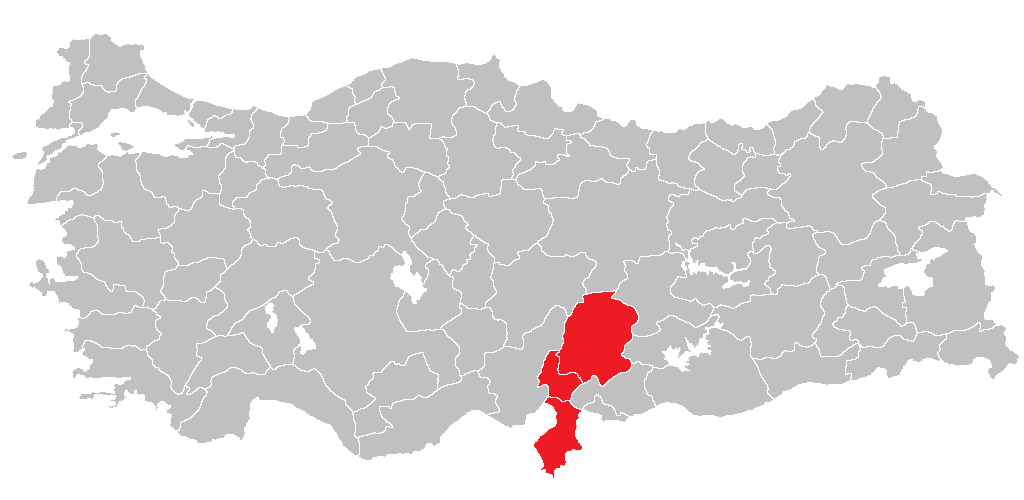
- Country: Turkey
- Region: Mediterranean

Area
  - Subregion: 23,497 km^{2} (9,072 sq mi)

Population (2013)
  - Subregion: 3,077,753
  - Rank: 8th
  - Density: 130.98/km^{2} (339.25/sq mi)
  - Urban: 2,953,639
  - Rural: 124,114

The Hatay Subregion (Turkish: Hatay Alt Bölgesi) (TR63) is a statistical subregion in Turkey.

== Provinces ==
- Hatay Province (TR631)
- Kahramanmaraş Province (TR632)
- Osmaniye Province (TR633)

== See also ==
- NUTS of Turkey

== Sources ==
- ESPON Database
