= Trabzon Subregion =

Trabzon Subregion Trabzon Alt Bölgesi
- Subregion
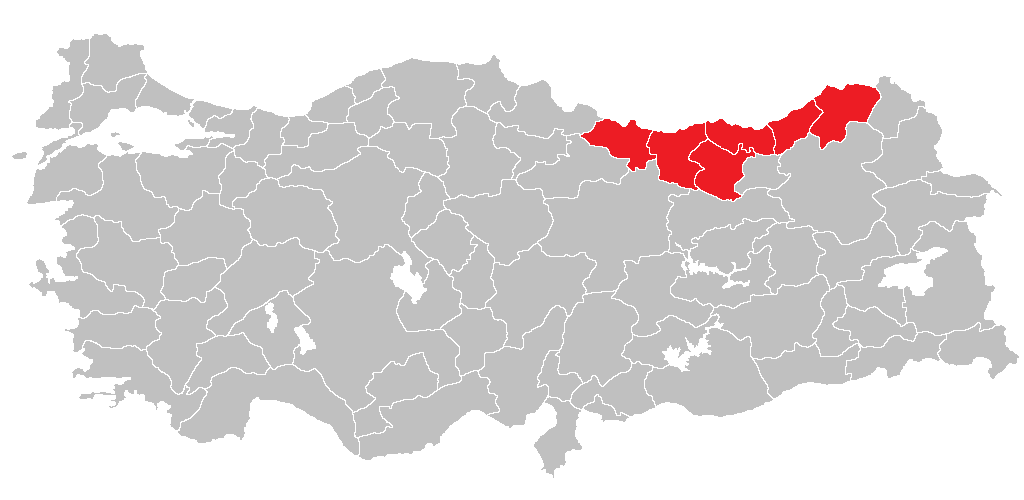
- Country: Turkey
- Region: East Black Sea

Area
  - Subregion: 37,551 km^{2} (14,499 sq mi)

Population (2013)
  - Subregion: 2,553,647
  - Rank: 14th
  - Density: 68.005/km^{2} (176.13/sq mi)
  - Urban: 2,110,677
  - Rural: 442,970

The Trabzon Subregion (Turkish: Trabzon Alt Bölgesi, TR90) is a statistical subregion in the eastern Black Sea region of Turkey.

== Provinces ==
- Trabzon Province (TR901)
- Ordu Province (TR902)
- Giresun Province (TR903)
- Rize Province (TR904)
- Artvin Province (TR905)
- Gümüşhane Province (TR906)

== See also ==
- NUTS of Turkey
