= Ağrı Subregion =

Ağrı Subregion Ağrı Alt Bölgesi
- Subregion
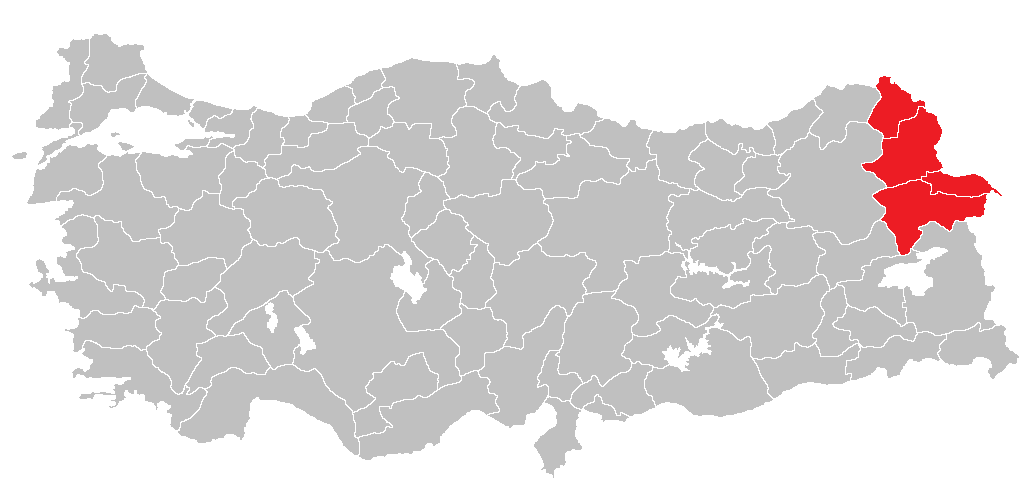
- Coordinates: 40.03°N 43.19°E
- Country: Turkey
- Region: Northeast Anatolia

Area
  - Subregion: 30,211 km^{2} (11,665 sq mi)

Population (2013)
  - Subregion: 1,145,257
  - Rank: 23rd
  - Density: 37.909/km^{2} (98.183/sq mi)
  - Urban: 562,531
  - Rural: 582,726

The Ağrı Subregion (Turkish: Ağrı Alt Bölgesi) (TRA2) is a statistical subregion in Turkey.

== Provinces ==
- Ağrı Province (TRA21)
- Kars Province (TRA22)
- Iğdır Province (TRA23)
- Ardahan Province (TRA24)

== See also ==
- NUTS of Turkey

== Sources ==
- ESPON Database
