= List of Turkish provinces by GDP =

This is a list of Turkish provinces by GDP and GDP per capita.

== List of provinces by GDP ==
Provinces by GDP in 2021 according to data by the Turkish Statistical Institute.

List of provinces in Turkey by GDP in 2021 (millions of GDP)
| | Average annual exchange rate in 2021: TRY 8.9808 per U.S. dollar | | | |
| Rank | Provinces | GDP (TRY) | GDP (US$) | Share (%) |
|---|---|---|---|---|
| 1 | Istanbul | 2,202,156 | 276,207 | 30.38 |
| 2 | Ankara | 667,142 | 74,285 | 9.20 |
| 3 | İzmir | 462,151 | 51,460 | 6.38 |
| 4 | Kocaeli | 309,314 | 34,442 | 4.27 |
| 5 | Bursa | 302,121 | 33,641 | 4.17 |
| 6 | Antalya | 208,472 | 23,213 | 2.88 |
| 7 | Konya | 149,229 | 16,616 | 2.06 |
| 8 | Gaziantep | 148,588 | 16,545 | 2.05 |
| 9 | Tekirdağ | 145,716 | 16,225 | 2.01 |
| 10 | Adana | 141,673 | 15,775 | 1.95 |
| 11 | Mersin | 139,761 | 15,562 | 1.93 |
| 12 | Manisa | 122,438 | 13,633 | 1.69 |
| 13 | Kayseri | 107,378 | 11,956 | 1.49 |
| 14 | Hatay | 101,462 | 11,298 | 1.40 |
| 15 | Balıkesir | 90,054 | 10,027 | 1.24 |
| 16 | Muğla | 84,810 | 9,444 | 1.17 |
| 17 | Sakarya | 81,740 | 9,102 | 1.13 |
| 18 | Eskişehir | 81,527 | 9,078 | 1.12 |
| 19 | Denizli | 81,382 | 9,062 | 1.12 |
| 20 | Samsun | 74,830 | 8,332 | 1.03 |
| 21 | Aydın | 65,204 | 7,260 | 0.90 |
| 22 | Kahramanmaraş | 63,004 | 7,015 | 0.87 |
| 23 | Diyarbakır | 62,494 | 6,959 | 0.86 |
| 24 | Şanlıurfa | 57,589 | 6,413 | 0.80 |
| 25 | Çanakkale | 49,142 | 5,472 | 0.68 |
| 26 | Trabzon | 43,979 | 4,897 | 0.61 |
| 27 | Mardin | 42,541 | 4,737 | 0.59 |
| 28 | Zonguldak | 42,031 | 4,680 | 0.58 |
| 29 | Afyonkarahisar | 40,975 | 4,563 | 0.57 |
| 30 | Malatya | 38,831 | 4,324 | 0.54 |
| 31 | Kütahya | 38,655 | 4,304 | 0.53 |
| 32 | Sivas | 36,080 | 4,018 | 0.50 |
| 33 | Kırklareli | 35,220 | 3,922 | 0.49 |
| 34 | Erzurum | 35,185 | 3,918 | 0.49 |
| 35 | Elazığ | 33,124 | 3,688 | 0.46 |
| 36 | Ordu | 33,093 | 3,685 | 0.46 |
| 37 | Van | 31,824 | 3,544 | 0.44 |
| 38 | Osmaniye | 30,946 | 3,446 | 0.43 |
| 39 | Düzce | 30,547 | 3,041 | 0.42 |
| 40 | Yalova | 29,308 | 3,263 | 0.40 |
| 41 | Bolu | 29,265 | 3,259 | 0.40 |
| 42 | Edirne | 28,029 | 3,121 | 0.39 |
| 43 | Uşak | 27,670 | 3,081 | 0.38 |
| 44 | Aksaray | 27,622 | 3,076 | 0.38 |
| 45 | Isparta | 27,333 | 3,044 | 0.38 |
| 46 | Çorum | 25,758 | 2,868 | 0.36 |
| 47 | Kastamonu | 25,542 | 2,844 | 0.35 |
| 48 | Şırnak | 24,415 | 2,719 | 0.34 |
| 49 | Tokat | 24,396 | 2,717 | 0.34 |
| 50 | Adıyaman | 23,236 | 2,587 | 0.32 |
| 51 | Bilecik | 23,515 | 2,618 | 0.32 |
| 52 | Batman | 22,798 | 2,539 | 0.32 |
| 53 | Giresun | 21,234 | 2,364 | 0.29 |
| 54 | Rize | 20,209 | 2,250 | 0.28 |
| 55 | Erzincan | 20,019 | 2,229 | 0.28 |
| 56 | Niğde | 19,603 | 2,183 | 0.27 |
| 57 | Kırıkkale | 18,663 | 2,078 | 0.26 |
| 58 | Yozgat | 18,313 | 2,039 | 0.25 |
| 59 | Karaman | 18,109 | 2,016 | 0.25 |
| 60 | Burdur | 18,025 | 2,007 | 0.25 |
| 61 | Amasya | 17,699 | 1,971 | 0.24 |
| 62 | Karabük | 17,120 | 1,906 | 0.24 |
| 63 | Nevşehir | 15,807 | 1,760 | 0.22 |
| 64 | Artvin | 15,303 | 1,704 | 0.21 |
| 65 | Muş | 14,279 | 1,590 | 0.20 |
| 66 | Ağrı | 14,225 | 1,584 | 0.20 |
| 67 | Kırşehir | 13,959 | 1,554 | 0.19 |
| 68 | Çankırı | 13,907 | 1,549 | 0.19 |
| 69 | Siirt | 13,165 | 1,466 | 0.18 |
| 70 | Hakkâri | 12,407 | 1,382 | 0.17 |
| 71 | Bitlis | 12,256 | 1,365 | 0.17 |
| 72 | Bingöl | 12,102 | 1,348 | 0.17 |
| 73 | Kars | 11,720 | 1,305 | 0.16 |
| 74 | Bartın | 10,683 | 1,190 | 0.15 |
| 75 | Sinop | 9,997 | 1,113 | 0.14 |
| 76 | Iğdır | 9,817 | 1,093 | 0.14 |
| 77 | Gümüşhane | 6,939 | 773 | 0.10 |
| 78 | Kilis | 7,007 | 780 | 0.10 |
| 79 | Tunceli | 6,099 | 679 | 0.08 |
| 80 | Ardahan | 4,968 | 553 | 0.07 |
| 81 | Bayburt | 3,861 | 430 | 0.05 |
| | Turkey | 7.248,789 | 807,143 | 100 |

== List of provinces by GDP per capita ==
Provinces by GDP per capita in 2024 according to data by the Turkish Statistical Institute.

List of provinces in Turkey by GDP per capita in 2024
| | Average annual exchange rate in 2024: TRY 23.8136 per U.S. dollar, TRY 12.548 per international dollar | | | | |
| Rank | Provinces | GDP per capita (TRY) | GDP per capita (US$) | GDP per capita (PPP) | Share (%) |
|---|---|---|---|---|---|
| 1 | İstanbul | 802.669 | 24,452 | 63,968 | 163 |
| 2 | Kocaeli | 788.873 | 24,031 | 62,868 | 171 |
| 3 | Ankara | 788.859 | 24,031 | 62,867 | 144 |
| 4 | Tekirdağ | 604.226 | 18,406 | 48,153 | 131 |
| 5 | Antalya | 561.429 | 17,103 | 44,743 | 112 |
| 6 | İzmir | 556.376 | 16,949 | 44,340 | 124 |
| 7 | Bolu | 548.317 | 16,703 | 43,698 | 106 |
| 8 | Kırklareli | 531.388 | 16,188 | 42,348 | 109 |
| 9 | Eskişehir | 530.834 | 16,171 | 42,304 | 104 |
| 10 | Bilecik | 527.473 | 16,068 | 42,036 | 117 |
| 11 | Muğla | 526.553 | 16,040 | 41,963 | 106 |
| 12 | Yalova | 501.231 | 15,269 | 39,945 | 114 |
| 13 | Bursa | 492.876 | 15,014 | 39,279 | 108 |
| 14 | Çanakkale | 482.680 | 14,704 | 38,467 | 104 |
| 15 | Sakarya | 479.426 | 14,605 | 38,207 | 95 |
| 16 | Tunceli | 478.675 | 14,582 | 38,147 | 84 |
| 17 | Karaman | 471.850 | 14,374 | 37,604 | 92 |
| 18 | Balıkesir | 459.714 | 14,004 | 36,636 | 89 |
| 19 | Manisa | 454.705 | 13,852 | 36,237 | 96 |
| 20 | Düzce | 450.404 | 13,721 | 35,894 | 90 |
| 21 | Mersin | 444.761 | 13,549 | 35,445 | 93 |
| 22 | Kırıkkale | 436.061 | 13,284 | 34,751 | 89 |
| 23 | Çankırı | 430.386 | 13,111 | 34,299 | 83 |
| 24 | Edirne | 417.266 | 12,711 | 33,254 | 84 |
| 25 | Denizli | 411.046 | 12,522 | 34,758 | 85 |
| 26 | Kütahya | 406.533 | 12,384 | 34,398 | 77 |
| 27 | Aksaray | 404.383 | 12,319 | 32,227 | 84 |
| 28 | Kayseri | 403.635 | 12,296 | 32,167 | 88 |
| 29 | Uşak | 397.680 | 12,114 | 31,693 | 74 |
| 30 | Kastamonu | 395.056 | 12,035 | 31,484 | 76 |
| 31 | Erzincan | 394.311 | 12,012 | 31,424 | 87 |
| 32 | Burdur | 392.276 | 11,950 | 31,262 | 82 |
| 33 | Artvin | 390.108 | 11,884 | 31,089 | 73 |
| 34 | Konya | 388.841 | 11,845 | 30,988 | 79 |
| 35 | Isparta | 388.226 | 11,826 | 30,939 | 76 |
| 36 | Aydın | 387.277 | 11,798 | 30,864 | 71 |
| 37 | Ardahan | 385.104 | 11,731 | 30,690 | 66 |
| 38 | Karabük | 369.785 | 11,265 | 29,470 | 66 |
| 39 | Samsun | 369.415 | 11,253 | 29,440 | 71 |
| 40 | Malatya | 365.880 | 11,146 | 29,158 | 57 |
| 41 | Nevşehir | 365.241 | 11,126 | 29,108 | 69 |
| 42 | Zonguldak | 364.851 | 11,114 | 29,076 | 79 |
| 43 | Niğde | 362.804 | 11,052 | 28,913 | 64 |
| 44 | Rize | 355.740 | 10,837 | 28,350 | 58 |
| 45 | Sivas | 351.134 | 10,697 | 27,983 | 64 |
| 46 | Adana | 350.981 | 10,692 | 27,971 | 79 |
| 47 | Elazığ | 349.939 | 10,660 | 27,888 | 63 |
| 48 | Kırşehir | 347.041 | 10,572 | 27,657 | 69 |
| 49 | Hatay | 346.978 | 10,570 | 27,652 | 65 |
| 50 | Amasya | 346.376 | 10,552 | 27,604 | 61 |
| 51 | Trabzon | 345.969 | 10,539 | 27,572 | 60 |
| 52 | Kahramanmaraş | 342.387 | 10,430 | 27,286 | 64 |
| 53 | Afyonkarahisar | 336.256 | 10,243 | 26,798 | 65 |
| 54 | Bayburt | 331.432 | 10,096 | 26,413 | 48 |
| 55 | Çorum | 328.605 | 10,010 | 26,188 | 57 |
| 56 | Adıyaman | 327.509 | 9,977 | 26,100 | 48 |
| 57 | Erzurum | 321.146 | 9,783 | 25,593 | 53 |
| 58 | Sinop | 321.023 | 9,779 | 25,584 | 57 |
| 59 | Bartın | 318.484 | 9,702 | 25,381 | 58 |
| 60 | Gaziantep | 318.204 | 9,693 | 25,359 | 77 |
| 61 | Osmaniye | 316.158 | 9,631 | 25,196 | 58 |
| 62 | Giresun | 307.828 | 9,377 | 24,532 | 49 |
| 63 | Şırnak | 306.150 | 9,326 | 24,398 | 55 |
| 64 | Hakkari | 304.752 | 9,284 | 24,287 | 51 |
| 65 | Yozgat | 303.087 | 9,233 | 24,154 | 53 |
| 66 | Kars | 302.089 | 9,203 | 24,075 | 45 |
| 67 | Ordu | 293.783 | 8,949 | 23,413 | 48 |
| 68 | Gümüşhane | 287.458 | 8,783 | 22,909 | 45 |
| 69 | Bingöl | 276.713 | 8,429 | 22,052 | 45 |
| 70 | Iğdır | 264.690 | 8,063 | 21,094 | 46 |
| 71 | Tokat | 264.527 | 8,058 | 21,081 | 44 |
| 72 | Siirt | 261.810 | 7,975 | 20,865 | 50 |
| 73 | Kilis | 253.567 | 7,724 | 20,208 | 67 |
| 74 | Mardin | 247.416 | 7,537 | 19,718 | 52 |
| 75 | Diyarbakır | 245.024 | 7,464 | 19,527 | 41 |
| 76 | Batman | 236.422 | 7,202 | 18,841 | 44 |
| 77 | Bitlis | 231.869 | 7,063 | 18,479 | 38 |
| 78 | Muş | 230.300 | 7,016 | 18,354 | 41 |
| 79 | Van | 230.049 | 6,185 | 16,182 | 31 |
| 80 | Ağrı | 194.660 | 5,930 | 15,513 | 31 |
| 81 | Şanlıurfa | 188.144 | 5,731 | 14,994 | 36 |
| | Turkey | 503,076 | 15,325 | 40,092 | 100 |

== See also ==
- Economy of Turkey
- List of Turkish regions by Human Development Index
