= Fortifications of Diyarbakır =

Fortress in the city of Diyarbakır, Turkey

UNESCO World Heritage Site
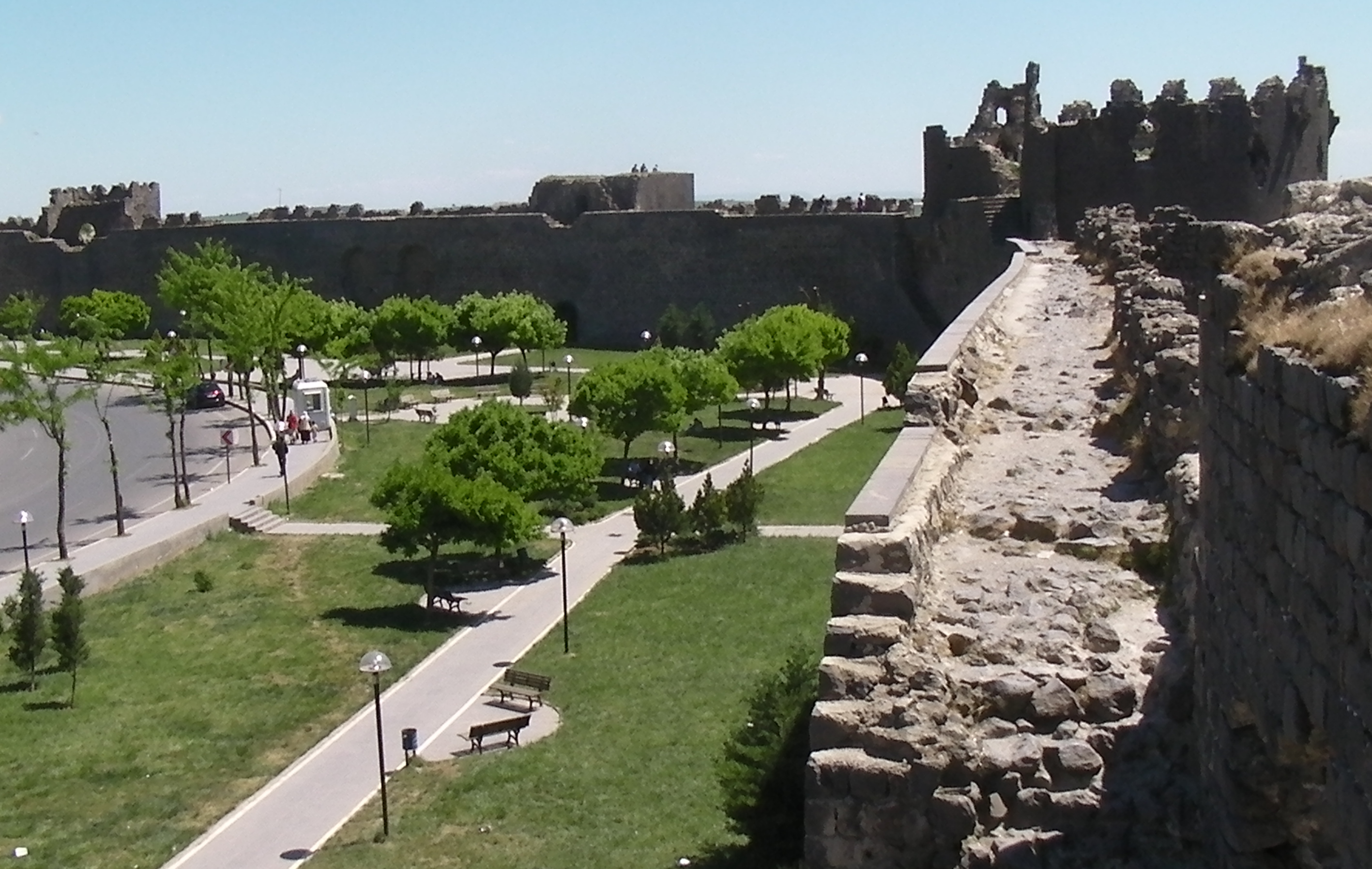

- Location within Turkey
- Location: Diyarbakır, Diyarbakır Province, Şanlıurfa Subregion, Southeast Anatolia Region, Turkey
- Part of: Diyarbakır Fortress and Hevsel Gardens Cultural Landscape
- Criteria: Cultural: (iv)
- Reference: 1488
- Inscription: 2015 (39th Session)
- Coordinates: 37°54′39.1″N 40°13′38.2″E

The Fortifications of Diyarbakır are a set of fortifications enclosing the historical district of Sur in Diyarbakır, Turkey. They consist of an inner fortress, the citadel, and an outer ring of city walls.

The main gates of the city are: Dağ (Mountain) Gate, Urfa Gate, Mardin Gate, and Yeni (New) Gate. The walls come from the old Roman city of Amida and were constructed in their present form in the mid-fourth century AD by the emperor Constantius II. According to Armenian historian Movses Khorenatsi, the fortifications and powerful walls of Amid-Diyarbakir were built in the middle of 6th century BC under Armenian King Tigranes of and during the Yervanduni (Orontid dynasty). They are the widest and longest complete defensive walls in the world after only the Great Wall of China (the Theodosian Walls for example are longer in length, but are not continuous).

UNESCO added the building to their tentative list on 2000, and listed it along with Hevsel Gardens as a World Heritage Site in 2015, under the designation Diyarbakır Fortress.

== History ==
Diyarbakir's walls were first built in 297 AD by the Romans, who had colonized the city in 230 AD. In 349 AD the walls were significantly expanded or reconstructed under the order of Emperor Constantius II. Over the next 1500+ years, these walls were expanded and reconstructed using volcanic rock from the surrounding region. The site includes remains from the Hurrians, Romans, Abbasids, Sejuks, Artuqids, Aq Qoyunlu, Ottomans. The city is considered to have a "multi-cultural, multi-lingual, and multi-culture character".

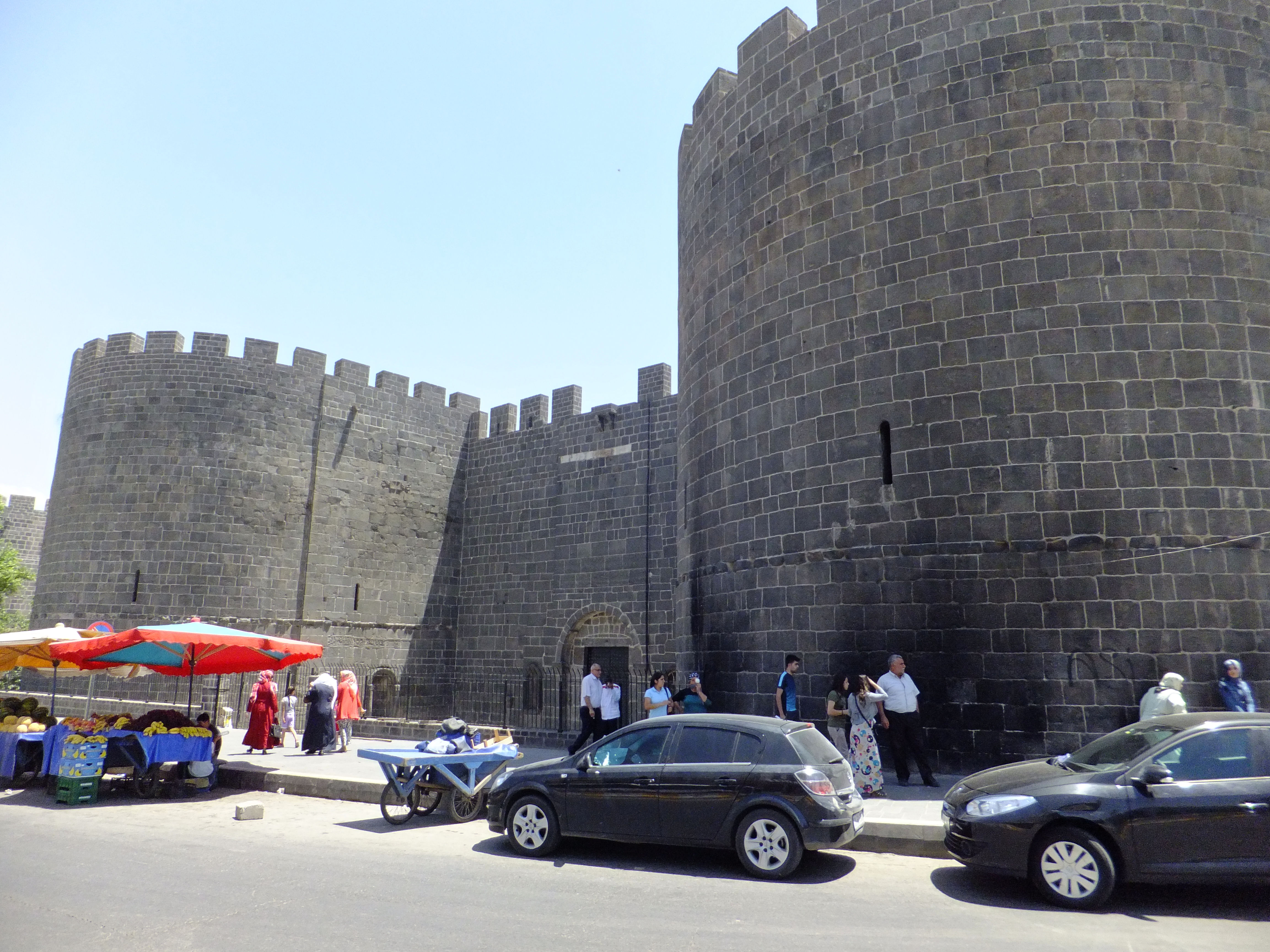
Harput Gate (or Dağ Kapı), the northern gate of the city. The gate preserves a Byzantine-era design but was reconstructed in 909 during the Abbasid period.

The walls were expanded and restored during the Byzantine period, particularly under Justinian I (6th century). After the Muslim conquest of the region in the 7th century, they underwent further restorations and reconstructions by various Muslim dynasties. Most of the walls in their current form today date from these medieval Muslim constructions.

In 899, after a revolt of the city's governor, the Abbasid caliph al-Mu'tadid ordered some parts of the walls to be demolished, including the Harput and Mardin gates (the north and south gates), and possibly the other main gates to the east and west. Surviving inscriptions attest that the Harput and Mardin gates were rebuilt in 909 on the orders of the Abbasid caliph al-Muqtadir, and it's likely that other parts of the walls demolished in 899 were repaired at this time. Starting around this period, craftsmen began to carve animal images onto new parts of the walls, in addition to Arabic inscriptions recording their work.

Under the Marwanids, work was undertaken to fortify the southeastern section of the walls in particular. During the brief period of Great Seljuk control of the city after 1088, the walls and towers were completely rebuilt by Malik-Shah I, though work was focused on the west walls. Under the Inalid dynasty (12th century), work continued on the eastern walls, between the New Gate (Yeni Kapı) and the Citadel. Up until this period, renovations had generally imitated Roman designs and masonry, using large blocks set in regular courses.

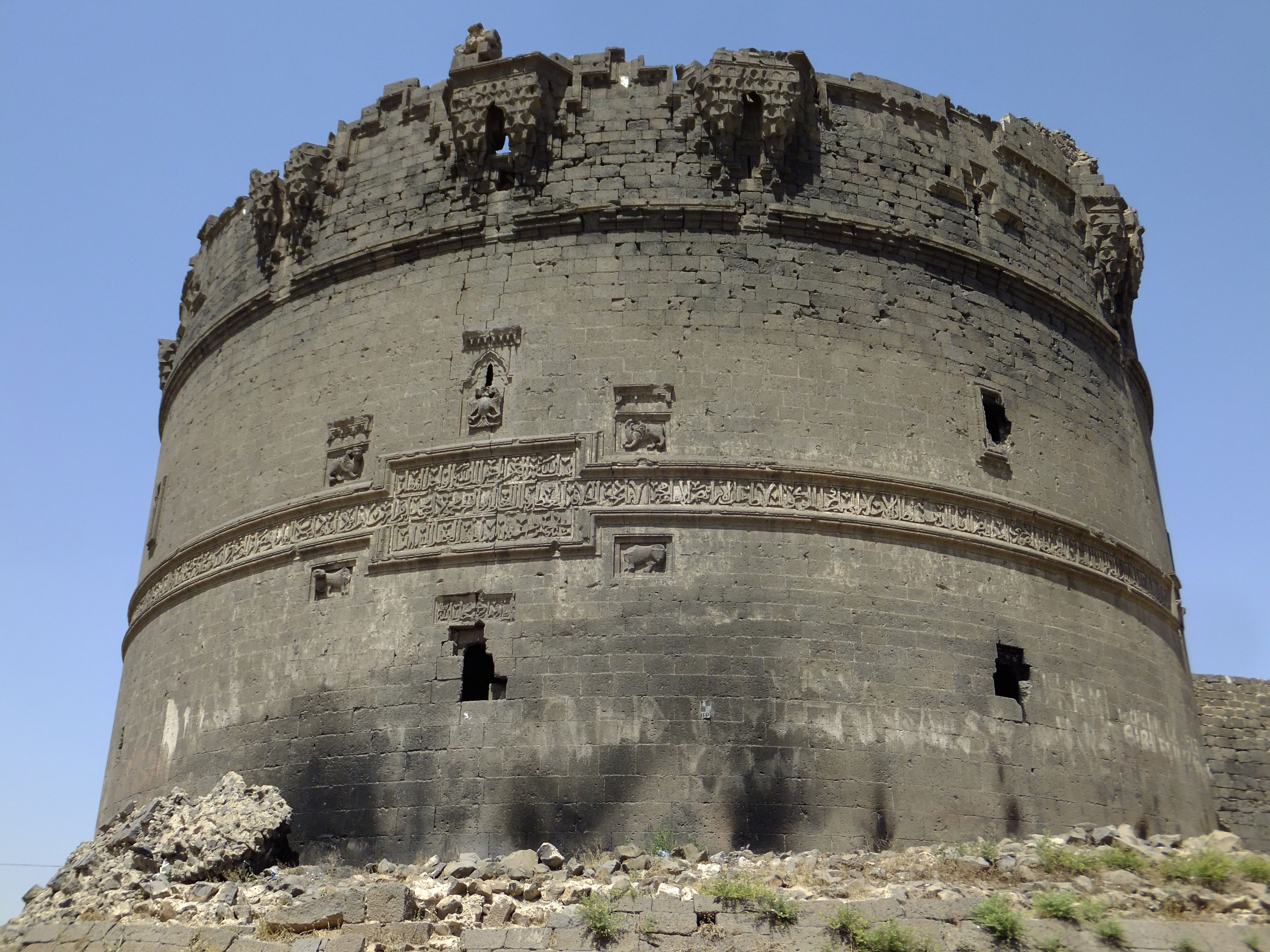
The Ulu Beden Tower in the southern city walls. It was built in 1208 during the Artuqid period and features carved Arabic inscriptions, animal motifs, and muqarnas.

The Inalids were expelled in the late 12th century by the Ayyubid ruler Saladin and were replaced by the Artuqids, who ruled the city until the 15th century. The Artuqid work on the walls featured much finer craftsmanship and used much smaller cut stones than the traditional Roman or Roman-imitating masonry. The Artuqids rebuilt the citadel in 1206–1207. In 1208–1209, they also built the two prominent towers along the southern wall, known as the Yedi Kardeş Tower and the Evli Beden or Ulu Beden Tower. These towers are distinguished by their carved stone decoration of calligraphic inscriptions and figurative images of animals and mythological creatures.

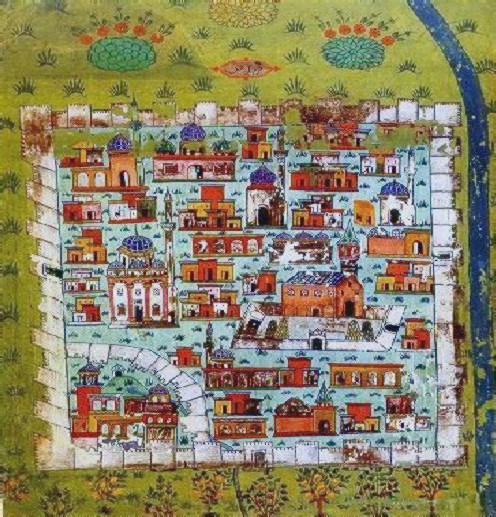
16th century plan of Diyarbakır by Matrakçı Nasuh

During the defeat of the Safavids and the Ottoman occupation of Diyarbakir in 1515, the Ottomans destroyed the walls with the use of cannons and they therefore had to be rebuilt. In the early Ottoman period of the city, the Citadel was expanded by moving the wall that separated it from the city further outward. The Ottoman repairs to the walls were strictly practical and less decorative than the work of preceding periods.

In 1930, a part of the wall was demolished. Two openings were made in walls to the west of the Harput Gate and east of the Mardin Gate in order to allow better traffic flow. Apart from these breaches, the city walls are mostly intact today, though some sections are in better condition than others.

In 2015, the war between the Turkish Army and Kurdish guerillas resulted in damage to the old town (Sur) and its monuments, disrupting government plans to conserve the historical city in hopes of attracting tourists to the Diyarbakir cultural area. About one-third of the old town was destroyed by the Turkish government after the clashes ended, irreversibly damaging the ancient city.

== Conservation ==
From 2000 to 2007, begun during the Mayorship of Feridun Çelik, a major restoration of the walls was executed. Buildings that were built directly on the wall were removed, the walls were cleaned and a park was given place alongside the walls. Though the walls and fortress itself were once compared to the Great Wall of China, this started to change as fighting broke out during 2015; walls from the fortress collapsed, along with a mosque, two churches, and the homes of many civilians, forcing some sections to be abandoned.

Sur is surrounded by city walls. The eastern half of the walled city depicted here (Sur) was leveled in 2015–2016 during the Kurdish–Turkish conflict.

As the war continued, the government of Turkey and UNESCO jointly began a reconstruction and preservation effort, intending to complete it within two years, starting with the demolition of part of the city. On July 4, 2015, UNESCO added the fortress and Hevsel Gardens Cultural Landscape to UNESCO's World Heritage List. UNESCO's main focus was to protect the environment of the land itself, more than the heritage of the land. The Turkish Prime Minister also spoke of plans to reconstruct the city walls as a great tourist attraction intended to resemble Paris; this provoked considerable controversy in Diyarbakır, with some locals arguing that they would lose their ancient culture heritage.

== Architecture ==
The Diyarbakir city walls measure up to 5.8 km (3.6 mi) long. They form a ring around the old city that is over 3 miles in circumference. The walls are over 33 feet high and are about 10–16 feet thick. They are the widest and longest complete defensive walls in the world after the Great Wall of China. There are four main gates and 82 towers along the walls. Included on the walls are about 63 inscriptions from various historical periods.

In the northeast, the citadel contains the first settlement inside Diyarbakir, and those walls stretch 598 meters long. The city walls enclose the more urban historic city of Diyarbakir. Most of these walls are constructed with traditional masonry and construction styles. The towers consist of 2-4 floors and are 4.4 meters thick on the ground floor and get thinner on higher floors.

The fortifications are constructed with stone, black basalt, and adobe, and have gone through countless renovations. The basalt fortifications are exceptionally durable, one reason why the structure has remained relatively intact for over 2000 years. Diyarbakir fortress is among the best surviving examples of a castle or fort built with a natural feature like a cliffside or body of water on one side as a boundary. The walls have a symbolic function as well as a defensive purpose, with inscriptions on the inner city's walls (the fort) that testify to the city of Diyarbakir's history.

The fortification plans reveal the dominance of two different building forms, circular and tetragonal. The walls were divided into five groups, four of which contained the towers around the four main gates, while the fifth contained the citadel towers. It has been found that 65 of the original 82 towers still remain on the outside of the city's walls and 18 of the citadel's towers remain today. Due to cultural differences, the fort has undergone some modifications. The fort was reconstructed, repaired and or heightened over time. However, the overall typology has remained constant in the fort's renovations.

== See also ==
- List of World Heritage Sites in Turkey
