= Hevsel Gardens =

World Heritage Site in Turkey

UNESCO World Heritage Site
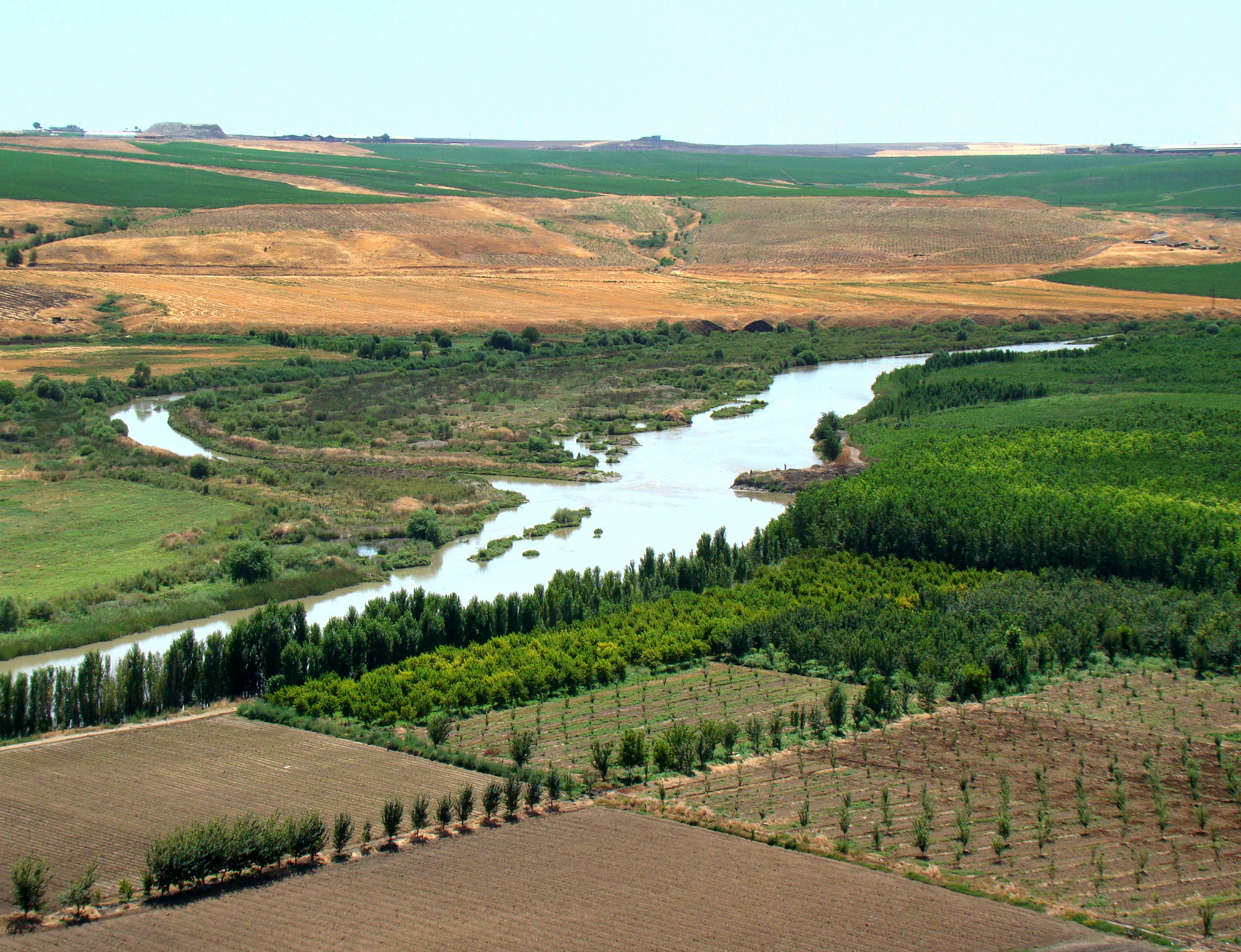

- Location within Turkey
- Location: Diyarbakır, Diyarbakır Province, Şanlıurfa Subregion, Southeast Anatolia Region, Turkey
- Part of: Diyarbakır Fortress and Hevsel Gardens Cultural Landscape
- Criteria: Cultural: (iv)
- Reference: 1488
- Inscription: 2015 (39th Session)
- Coordinates: 37°54′27″N 40°14′51″E

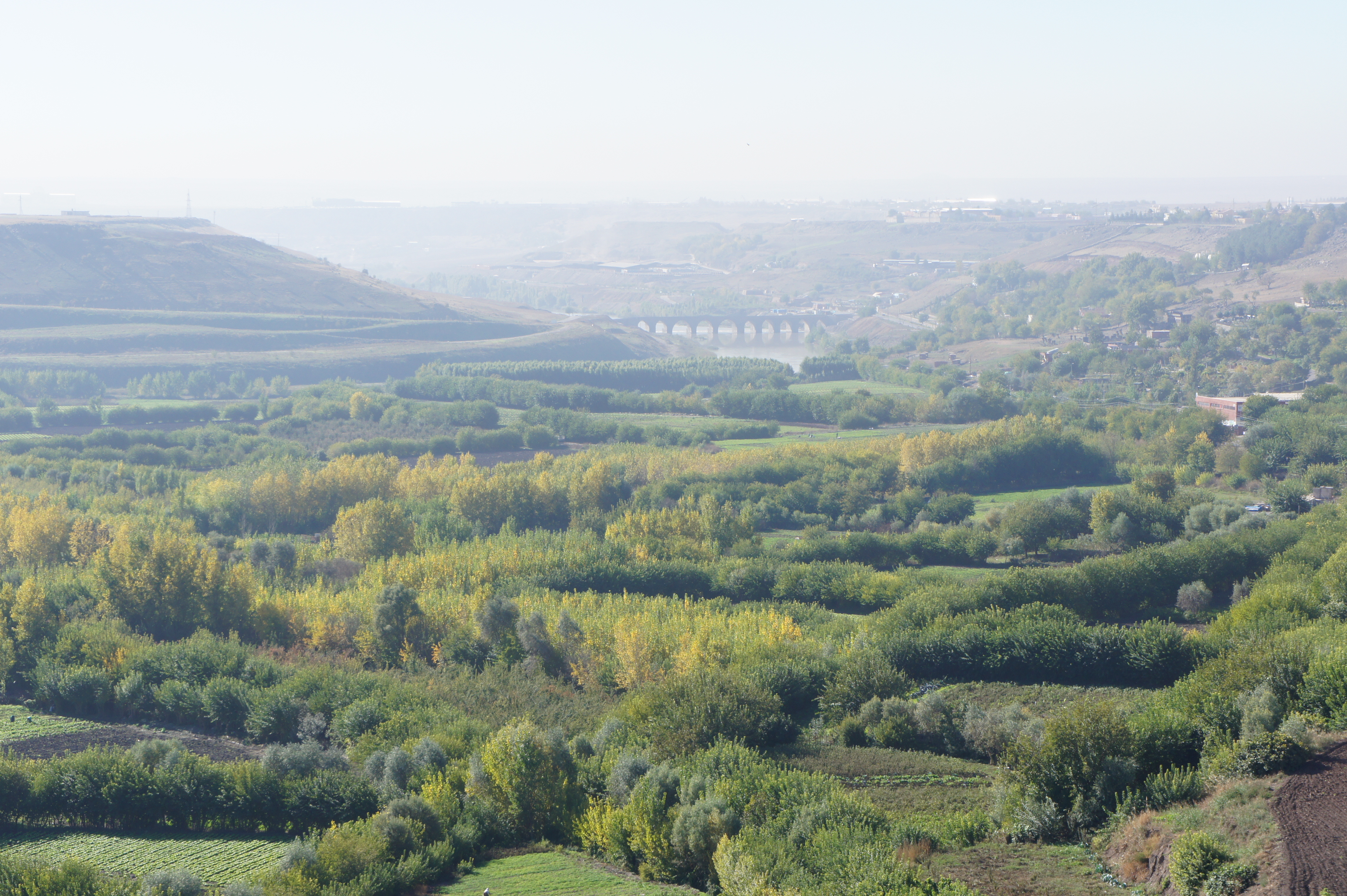
The gardens in 2010

The Hevsel Gardens (Turkish: Hevsel Bahçeleri, Kurdish: Baxçeyên Hewselê), are the seven hundred hectares of cultivated, fertile lands near the Tigris in eastern Turkey, between the Diyarbakır Fortress and the river. The fortified city was enclosed by a two-part system of defensive walls, and the gardens, fed by springs on the steep slope below, played a vital role in keeping the city provisioned and watered. The gardens were added to the UNESCO tentative list in 2013, and they became a World Heritage Site in 2015, along with the walls of Diyarbakır Fortress.

== History ==
The Hevsel Gardens are first mentioned in Aramean chronicles dating from the ninth century BC, the settlement of Diyarbakır on the hill above having been established earlier than this. Diyarbakır (originally called Amid), was built on a basalt escarpment overlooking the Tigris River. In 866 bc, the city was besieged by the Assyrian King Ashurnasirpal II and when it fell, the gardens were destroyed as a form of punishment. The fortified city has been of importance in the region during the Hellenistic period, and during the Roman, Sassanid, Byzantine, Islamic and Ottoman Empires up to modern times.

The Hevsel Gardens were created between the city and the river, with the objective of providing water and food for the inhabitants. Numerous springs emerge from beneath the basalt and the gardens are divided into five terraces above the present Tigris floodplain. The terraces have been formed over millennia as the river meandered in its wide valley and sometimes carved itself a deeper channel. The uppermost part of the garden will have been critical to the siting of the city; the gardens were regarded as sacred because of their important provisioning role, and have been compared to the Garden of Eden.

By 1655 the gardens included both banks of the Tigris and were said to be filled with fragrant orchards, vineyards, rose gardens and basil gardens. Nineteenth century travellers reported seeing a great variety of vegetables and fruit grown, and commented on the melons, grapes and apricots, and the famous watermelons, which were grown on the sandy islands formed by the braided river. The gardens were integrated with the city, with poplars and fruit trees separating the different vegetable gardens, and the waste water from the city being channelled to provide fertility and to drive water wheels. Mulberry trees were grown to support a silk industry in the city, and timber was produced, from poplar and willow trees, and shipped to Mosul Province on rafts.

Nowadays, about one third of the gardens is used for growing poplars and the rest for cultivation of a great range of produce; cabbage, spinach, lettuce, radish, green onions, parsley, watercress, eggplants, squashes, tomatoes, peppers and beans, peaches, apricots, plums, cherries, figs, mulberries and nuts.

== Conservation ==
The Hevsel Gardens are still cultivated to this day, but their integrity is threatened by unauthorised businesses and dwellings that have been established at the base of the fortress. Other concerns are blocked drainage channels and water quality. Extraction of water higher up the Tigris Valley has reduced waterflow in the river and decreased periodic inundation of the floodplain. Buffer zones have been established, but the gardens are considered vulnerable.
