= Bilad al-Sham =

Provincial region of the Rashidun, Umayyad, Abbasid, and Fatimid caliphates

Bilad al-Sham بِلَاد الشَّام
- Province of the Rashidun, Umayyad, Abbasid, and Fatimid caliphates
- 630s–1099
- Arab Syria (Bilad al-Sham) and its 6 military districts under the Abbasid Caliphate in the 9th century
- Capital: Damascus
- Historical era: Late antiquity, Middle Ages
  - Muslim conquest: 630s
  - First Fitna: 656–661
  - Tulunid control: 878–905
  - First Crusade: 1099
- Subdivisions
  - Type: Jund
  - Units: Dimashq; Hims; Filastin; al-Urdunn; Al-Sharat; Qinnasrin
Preceded by	Succeeded by
Diocese of the East	Ikhshidid Dynasty; Hamdanid dynasty

Bilad al-Sham (Arabic: بِلَاد الشَّام, romanized: Bilād al-Shām), often referred to as Islamic Syria or simply Syria in English-language sources, was a province of the Rashidun, Umayyad, Abbasid, and Fatimid caliphates. It roughly corresponded with the Byzantine Diocese of the East, conquered by the Muslims in 634–647. Under the Umayyads (661–750), Bilad al-Sham was the metropolitan province of the Caliphate and different localities throughout the province served as the seats of the Umayyad caliphs and princes.

Bilad al-Sham was first organized into the four ajnad (military districts; singular jund) of Dimashq (Damascus), Hims (Homs), al-Urdunn (Jordan), and Filastin (Palestine), between 637 and 640 by Caliph Umar following the Muslim conquest. The jund of Qinnasrin was created out of the northern part of Hims by caliphs Mu'awiya I (r. 661–680) or Yazid I (r. 680–683). The Jazira (Upper Mesopotamia) was made an independent province from the Mesopotamian part of Qinnasrin by Caliph Abd al-Malik in 692. In 786, the jund of al-Awasim and al-Thughur were established from the northern frontier region of Qinnasrin by Caliph Harun al-Rashid. As centralized Abbasid rule over Bilad al-Sham collapsed in the 10th century, control over the region was divided by several potentates and the ajnad only represented nominal divisions. The Abbasids and the Egypt-based Fatimid Caliphate continued to officially recognize the province and its ajnad until the Crusader invasions of the coastal regions in 1099.

== Name ==
The name Bilad al-Sham in Arabic translates as "the left-hand region". It was so named from the perspective of the people of the Hejaz (western Arabia), who considered themselves to be facing the rising sun, that the Syrian region was positioned to their left, while to their right was al-Yaman ("the right-hand-region").

== Geography ==
Bilad al-Sham comprised the area of the region of Syria, spanning the modern countries of Syria, Lebanon, Jordan, Israel, and Palestine, as well as the regions of Hatay, Gaziantep, and Diyarbakir in modern Turkey. It was bound by the Mediterranean Sea in the west and the Syrian Desert in the east toward Iraq. The western, Mediterranean coastal range were characterized by rolling hills in Palestine in the south, rising to their highest points in Mount Lebanon in the center before becoming considerably lower in the Jabal Ansariya range in the north. Eastward from the coastal range, the ridges of inland Syria become gradually lower, with the exception of Mount Hermon north of the Golan, and include the ranges of the Anti-Lebanon, Jabal al-Ruwaq, and Jabal Bishri. With the termination of the inland ridges begins the mostly level Syrian steppe.

== History ==
=== Muslim conquest ===
Following the consolidation of Islamic hegemony over Arabia and its nomadic Arab tribes in the Ridda wars of 632–633, the caliph (leader of the Muslim community) Abu Bakr (r. 632–634) turned the nascent Muslim state's goals toward the conquest of Syria. The conquest unfolded in three main phases, according to the historian Fred Donner. In the first phase, Abu Bakr dispatched four armies from Medina in late 633 led by the commanders Amr ibn al-As, Yazid ibn Abi Sufyan, Shurahbil ibn Hasana, all veterans of the Ridda wars, and Abu Ubayda ibn al-Jarrah, a leading companion of Muhammad. Abu Ubayda may not have been dispatched until 636. Each commander was assigned to a different zone, with Amr entrusted over Palestine, Yazid to the Balqa (central Transjordan), Shurahbil to southern Transjordan, and Abu Ubayda to the Ghassanid stomping grounds of the Golan Heights. The Muslim commanders mainly engaged in small-scale skirmishes in the southern Syrian countryside with local garrisons. The goal of the Muslims at the start of the conquest was likely bringing the Arabic-speaking nomadic, semi-nomadic, and settled tribesmen of the southern Syrian desert fringes under their control.

The second phase began with the arrival of Khalid ibn al-Walid and his troops to Syria in 634. Under Khalid's supreme command, the Muslim armies besieged and captured the southern Syrian urban centers of Bosra, Damascus, Beisan (Scythopolis), Pella, Gaza, and temporarily, Homs (Emesa) and Baalbek (Hierapolis). Heraclius responded by deploying successive imperial armies against the Muslims. The Byzantines were decisively defeated in the resulting major battles of Ajnadayn in Palestine and Fahl and Yarmouk in Transjordan, all occurring in 634–636. The Muslim battlefield victories effectively ended organized resistance by the Byzantines.

In the third phase, beginning about 637, the Muslim armies quickly occupied the northern Syrian countryside, while steadily conquering individual towns throughout the region whose garrisons held out alone following the breakdown of the imperial defense. Among the towns, a number of which held out until 637 or 638, were Aleppo (Beroea) and Qinnasrin (Chalcis) in the north, Hama, Homs and Baalbek (the latter two possibly for the second time), Damascus possibly for the second time, and Jerusalem. Within the next few years, the Mediterranean coastal towns of Beirut, Sidon, Tyre, Caesarea, Antioch, Tripoli and Ascalon were captured by Muslim forces.

=== Governorship of Mu'awiya ===
Umar had appointed Abu Ubayda ibn al-Jarrah commander of the Muslim troops in Syria in c. 636 and supreme governor of the conquered regions. Abu Ubayda died in the plague of Amwas, which devastated the Muslims at their camp near Jerusalem and caused significant loss of life throughout Syria. Umar replaced him with Yazid ibn Abi Sufyan in the southern districts of Syria and Iyad ibn Ghanm in the northern districts. Yazid died from the plague soon after and was replaced by his brother Mu'awiya. Umar's successor, Caliph Uthman (r. 644–656), gradually expanded Mu'awiya's governorship to span all of Syria.

As governor, Mu'awiya, forged strong ties with the old-established Arab tribes of Syria, which, by dint of their long service under the Byzantines, were more politically experienced than the tribesmen of Arabia, who filled the ranks of the Muslim armies. Among the Syrian tribes, the powerful Banu Kalb and their Quda'a confederacy gained the preeminent position in Mu'awiya's government. He also accommodated Arab newcomers, most prominently the Kinda from South Arabia. The tribes and commanders of Syria backed Mu'awiya in his confrontation with Caliph Ali at the Battle of Siffin in 657, which ended in a stalemate and an agreement to arbitrate their dispute. The arbitration talks collapsed and Mu'awiya's Syrian supporters recognized him as caliph in a ceremony in Jerusalem in 660. Ali was murdered the following year, paving the way for Mu'awiya to gain control of the rest of the Caliphate.

=== Umayyad period ===
Syria became the metropolitan province of the Umayyad Caliphate which Mu'awiya founded and whose capital was at Damascus. Syria's history under Umayyad rule was "essentially the history of the Umayyad dynasty", according to the historians Henri Lammens and Clifford Edmund Bosworth. Mu'awiya had his son Yazid I, the son of a Kalbi woman, recognized as his successor. Yazid I (r. 680–683) was opposed by the people of the Hejaz, whose revolt against him was crushed by Syria's troops at the Battle of al-Harra. The Syrians proceeded to besiege Mecca in 683, but withdrew to Syria after Yazid I died. The Meccan leader of the revolt, Ibn al-Zubayr, was recognized as caliph across much of the Muslim empire, while Yazid I's son and successor, Mu'awiya II, succumbed to the plague.

The Kalb and other loyalist tribes elected another Umayyad, Marwan I, as caliph and he moved to secure the dynasty's Syrian heartland. With these tribes' support, he defeated the Qays tribes and other supporters of Ibn al-Zubayr at the Battle of Marj Rahit, north of Damascus, in 684. Under his son and successor, Abd al-Malik (r. 685–705), Syrian troops reconquered the rest of the Caliphate and killed Ibn al-Zubayr in a second siege of Mecca. A standing army composed of the Syrian tribal soldiery was established under this caliph and his sons and successors. Abd al-Malik inaugurated a more Arab–Islamic government in Syria by changing the language of its bureaucracy from Greek to Arabic, switching from Byzantine coinage to a strictly Islamic currency, and building the Dome of the Rock in Jerusalem, which he may have promoted as an additional center of Muslim pilgrimage to Mecca.

Abd al-Malik's son and successor, al-Walid I (r. 705–715), ruled with autocratic tendencies and less tolerance for the non-Muslims in Syria and the empire in general, which reached its greatest territorial extent during his reign. He largely demolished the Christian basilica of St. John in Damascus and built in its place the landmark Great Umayyad Mosque. He achieved great popularity among the Syrian Arabs. During his rule and that of his successors, Damascus retained its role as the administrative capital of the empire, but the caliphs increasingly resided in their country estates in the Syrian steppe.

After a period of stagnation, the caliph Hisham (r. 724–743) restored the prestige of the Umayyad Caliphate through his administrative reforms, state-building and austerity, though the conquests ground to a halt. His successor, al-Walid II, was assassinated, sparking the Third Muslim Civil War. The next caliph, Yazid III, died after a few months, followed by the weak rule of Ibrahim. Marwan II took control in late 744, crushed his Syrian tribal opponents, and shifted the capital to Harran, outside of Syria, which increased Syrian opposition to his rule.

=== Post-Umayyad period ===
Bilad al-Sham became much less important under the Abbasid Caliphate, which succeeded the Umayyads in 750. The Abbasids moved the capital first to Kufa, and then to Baghdad and Samarra, all of which were in Iraq, which consequently became their most important province. The mainly Arab Syrians were marginalized by Iranian and Turkish forces who rose to power under the Abbasids, a trend which also expressed itself on a cultural level. From 878 until 905, Syria came under the effective control of the Tulunids of Egypt, but direct Abbasid control was re-established soon thereafter. It lasted until the 940s, when the province was partitioned between the Hamdanid Emirate of Aleppo in the north and Ikhshidid-controlled Egypt in the south. In the 960s the Byzantine Empire under Nikephoros II Phokas conquered much of northern Syria, and Aleppo became a Byzantine tributary, while the southern provinces passed to the Fatimid Caliphate after its conquest of Egypt in 969. The division of Syria into northern and southern parts would persist, despite political changes, until the Mamluk conquest in the late 13th century.

== Administrative history ==
=== Roman–Byzantine precursors ===
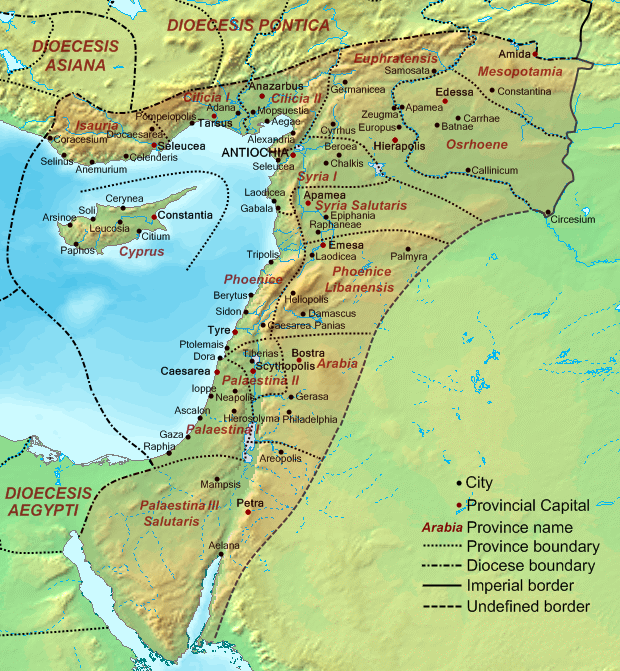
Administrative divisions of the Diocese of the East (Byzantine Syria)

The ajnad were an adaptation of the preexisting administrative system of the Diocese of the East (Byzantine Syria) to suit the nascent Muslim state's needs. The Byzantine system, in turn, had been based on that instituted by its Roman predecessor in the aftermath of the First Jewish Revolt in 70 CE and the Bar Kokhba Revolt in 135 CE. To establish closer control over the broadly spread population of Syria following the revolts, the region was subdivided into smaller units centered around an urban center which policed and collected taxes from the surrounding hinterland. By 400 the southern half of Syria was divided between the three Palestines (Palaestina Prima, Palaestina Secunda, and Palaestina Tertia), Phoenice and Arabia.

=== Beginnings of Islamic administration ===
Following the decisive Muslim victory at Yarmouk in 636, and the occupation of most of the Mediterranean coast and northern Syria in the next two years, the Muslims began to militarily and administratively organize the region for their needs. Caliph Umar, who ruled from Medina, visited the Muslim army's principal camp at Jabiya, the former Ghassanid capital, at least once between 637 and 639. From there he personally oversaw the distribution of allowances (ata) and rations (rizq) to the Muslim soldiery, tax collection from the conquered population, and the appointments to military command. There may have been initial Muslim intentions to establish Jabiya as the permanent, central garrison town of Syria along the lines of those later established in the conquered regions of Iraq (Kufa and Basra), Egypt (Fustat), and Ifriqiya (Kairouan). Those garrison cities developed into major urban centers of the Caliphate. During one of his visits, or by 640 at the latest, the central army camp at Jabiya was disbanded by Umar. Instead, as a result of several factors, "a self-supporting, more flexible" military-administrative system was established, according to the historian Alan Walmsley.

Unlike Iraq and Egypt where settlement was concentrated along the major rivers of those provinces, Syrian settlement was distributed over an extensive area of mountains, valleys, and plains. The complex geography slowed communications and army movements in the region, necessitating multiple regional centers for efficient administration and defense; according to Walmsley, this was "a principle confirmed by over 500 years of Roman and Byzantine administration". The change of Muslim military objectives following Yarmouk, when focus shifted to the northern Syrian and Mediterranean fronts, also necessitated the establishment of additional army headquarters and garrisons, such as Homs, diminishing Jabiya's centrality. Further reducing troop numbers in Jabiya was the Plague of Amwas in 639, which reduced the garrison there from 24,000 to 4,000. The decrease was likely due to factors in addition to the plague. In late 639 or early 640, a significant number of Muslim troops also left Syria for the conquest of Egypt under Amr's command.

Troop numbers in Jabiya could not be restored in the aftermath of the plague and the departure of Muslim troops to other fronts. Unlike in Iraq where there were high levels of Arab tribal immigration, similar immigration into Syria was restricted by the Qurayshite elite in a bid to preserve their pre-established interests in the region. Syria had a substantial, long-standing Arab population, both in the tribes who dominated the steppe and formerly served Byzantium and in the urban Arab communities, particularly those of Damascus and Homs. Not long after Yarmouk, the Arab tribes of Syria were incorporated into the nascent Muslim military structure there. The native tribes had a preference for the established urban centers with which they were long familiarized. Muslim settlement in the urban centers was facilitated by the wide availability of property in the cities in the wake of the conquests, as a result of the exodus of pro-Byzantine, Greek-speaking residents or in property transfers to the Muslims secured in capitulation agreements. Muslim settlement in the hinterland, on the other hand, was limited as the Aramaic-speaking peasantry remained in their villages.

=== The jund divisions ===
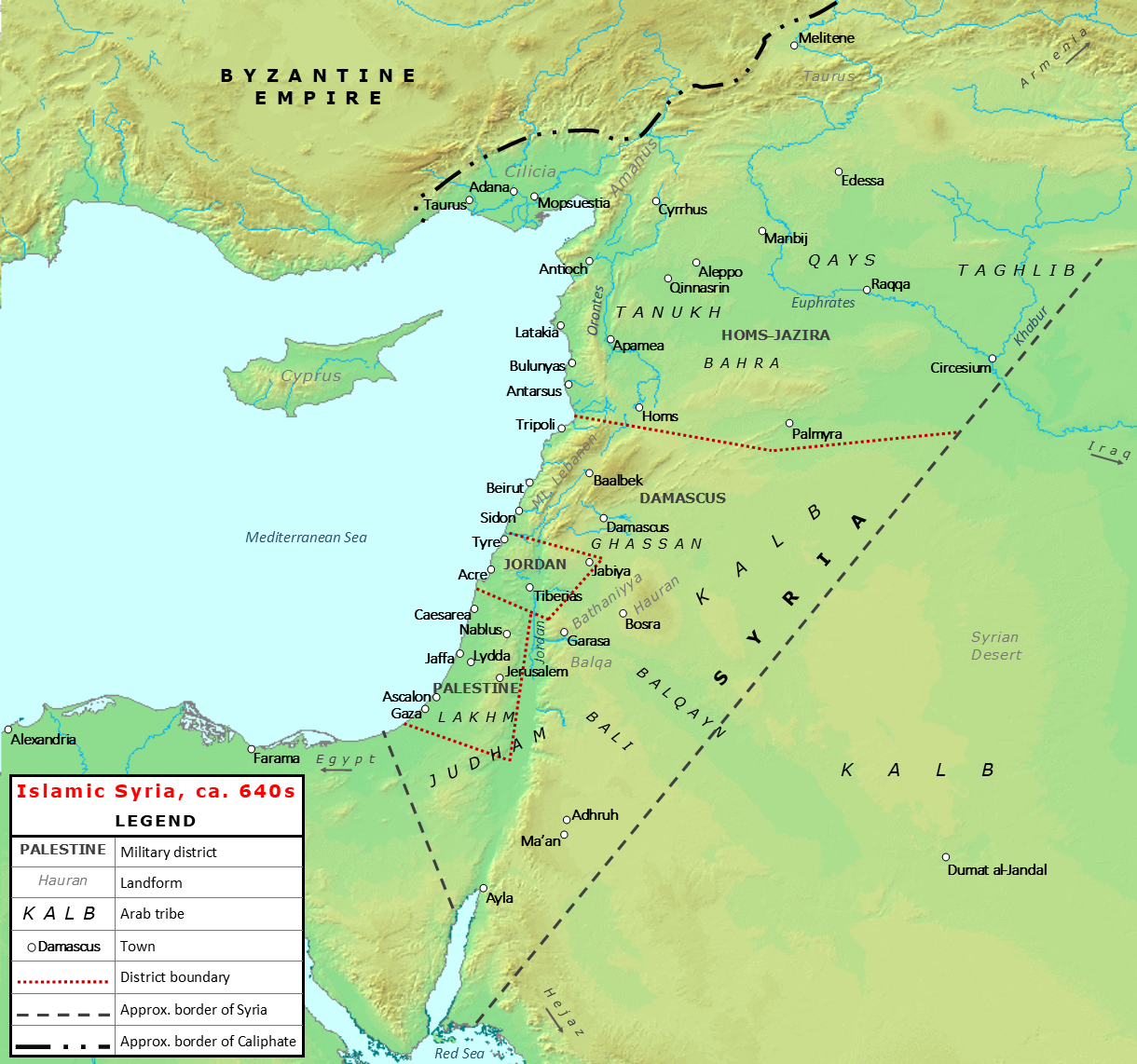
Map depicting the original ajnad (approximate boundaries), and the important towns and Arab tribes of Bilad al-Sham in the 640s

Umar divided Syria into the four ajnad of Filastin, al-Urdunn, Dimashq, and Hims. The new garrisons were assigned to the urban centers of Lydda, Tiberias, Damascus, and Homs, respectively. In effect, Umar gave his sanction of the existing military situation in Syria, where different army units operated independently on the different fronts. By establishing the ajnad, Umar transformed the military structures into provincial governments concerned with the taxation of the local populations and the distribution of collected money and supplies for the troops. During the caliphate of Umar's successor Uthman (r. 644–656), supplemental garrisons were established in the respective ajnad, especially in the coastal cities.

During the reign of Mu'awiya I or Yazid I, Qinnasrin (northern Syria) and the Jazira (Upper Mesopotamia) were separated from Jund Hims and became Jund Qinnasrin. The separation may have been a response to the influx of northern Arab (Qays and Mudar) immigrant tribesmen to Qinnasrin and the Jazira during Mu'awiya's governorship and caliphate. In 692 Caliph Abd al-Malik separated the Jazira from Jund Qinnasrin, and it became the independent province of the Jazira. According to Blankinship, this change of status may have been related to the peace settlement reached with the Qays in 691 after the Qays had rebelled against the Umayyads during the Second Muslim Civil War. According to the historian Hugh N. Kennedy, the separation was done at the request of Muhammad ibn Marwan, Abd al-Malik's brother and his commander responsible for the Jazira.

In 786 Caliph Harun al-Rashid established Jund al-Awasim out of the northern part of Jund Qinnasrin. It spanned the frontier zone with the Byzantine Empire, extending from the areas immediately south of Antioch, Aleppo, and Manbij and eastward to the Euphrates. Manbij and later Antioch became the capitals of the new jund. Jund al-Awasim served as the second defensive line behind the actual frontier zone, the Thughur, which encompassed the far northern Syrian towns of Baghras, Bayas, Duluk, Alexandretta, Cyrrhus, Ra'ban and Tizin. The Thughur was subdivided into the Cilician or Syrian al-Thughur al-Sha'miya and the Jaziran or Mesopotamian al-Thughur al-Jaziriya sectors, roughly separated by the Amanus mountains. Tarsus and Malatya were the most important towns in the Syrian and the Mesopotamian sectors respectively, though the two districts did not have administrative capitals sometimes were under the administrative control of Jund al-Awasim. By the 10th century, the terms Thughur and al-Awasim were often used interchangeably in the sources.

The governor of the provinces were called wali or amir.

- Jund Dimashq (جُـنْـد دِمَـشْـق, "military district of Damascus"), with its capital at Damascus, was the largest of the provinces and encompassed much of present-day Lebanon and territories east of the Jordan River known as the al-Balqa region.
- Jund Filastin (جُـنْـد فِـلَـسْـطِـيْـن, "military district of Palestine") stretched from Aqaba on the Red Sea and al-'Arish in the Sinai in the south to the lower Galilee in the north, encompassing most of the territory of the Byzantine provinces of Palaestina Prima and Palaestina Tertia. The Tulunids expanded the province eastwards and southwards, at the expense of Jund Dimasq, to include regions in modern-day southern Jordan and north-western Saudi Arabia. Ramla was founded in 715 and became both the administrative capital and most important city in Palestine.
- Jund al-Urdunn (جُـنْـد الْأُرْدُنّ, "military district of the Jordan") corresponded with Palaestina Secunda and covered most of the Galilee and the western part of Peraea in Transjordan. It also included the cities Acre and Tyre on the coast. Tabariyyah (Tiberias) replaced Scythopolis as the new capital of the province.
- Jund Hims (جُـنْـد حِـمْـص, "military district of Homs"), with its capital at Homs.
- Jund Qinnasrin (جُـنْـد قِـنَّـسْـرِيْـن, "military district of Qinnasrin"), with its capital at Qinnasrin, was carved out of the northern part of Jund Hims.

=== Post-Abbasid rule ===
As direct Abbasid rule over the Levant faltered and eventually collapsed in the 10th century, different parts of the region were controlled by several different rulerships. The ajnad became nominal divisions with no practical relevance. The administrative system continued to be officially recognized by the Abbasid and Fatimid governments until the Crusader conquests of the western parts of Bilad al-Sham, beginning in 1099. As a geographic expression, "Bilad al-Sham" continued to be used by Arabic-speaking Muslims into the late 19th century, when Suriyya, the Arabic word for "Syria", generally replaced the term in common usage. Leading up to that point, Suriyya had been increasingly used in 19th-century Arabic Christian literature and among Europeans.

== See also ==
- Crusader states (Outremer)
- Palaestina Prima
- Syria Palaestina

== Bibliography ==
- Aigle, Denise, ed. (2012). Le Bilād al-Šām face aux mondes extérieurs. La perception de l'Autre et la représentation du Souverain [Bilad al-Sham, the face to the outer worlds. The perception of the Other and the representation of the Sovereign] (in French) (1st ed.). Presses de l'Ifpo. ISBN 978-2-35159-197-0. Archived from the original on 2016-03-16.
- Athamina, Khalil (July 1994). "The Appointment and Dismissal of Khālid b. al-Walīd from the Supreme Command: A Study of the Political Strategy of the Early Muslim Caliphs in Syria". Arabica. 41 (2). Brill: 253–272. doi:10.1163/157005894X00191. JSTOR 4057449.
- Blankinship, Khalid Yahya (1994). The End of the Jihâd State: The Reign of Hishām ibn ʻAbd al-Malik and the Collapse of the Umayyads. Albany, New York: State University of New York Press. ISBN 978-0-7914-1827-7.
- Bosworth, C. E. (1997). "Al-Shām". In Bosworth, C. E.; van Donzel, E.; Heinrichs, W. P. & Lecomte, G. (eds.). The Encyclopaedia of Islam, Second Edition. Volume IX: San–Sze. Leiden: E. J. Brill. p. 261. ISBN 978-90-04-10422-8.
- Crone, Patricia (1980). Slaves on Horses: The Evolution of the Islamic Polity (1980 ed.). Cambridge: Cambridge University Press. ISBN 978-0521229616.
- Donner, Fred M. (1981). The Early Islamic Conquests. Princeton: Princeton University Press. ISBN 0-691-05327-8.
- El-Cheikh, Nadia Maria (2004). Byzantium Viewed by the Arabs. Cambridge: Harvard Center for Middle Eastern Studies. ISBN 0-932885-30-6.
- Cobb, Paul M. (2001). White Banners: Contention in 'Abbasid Syria, 750–880. SUNY Press. ISBN 978-0-7914-4880-9.
- Gil, Moshe (1997). A History of Palestine, 634-1099. Cambridge University Press. ISBN 978-0-521-59984-9.
- Hinds, M. (1993). "Muʿāwiya I b. Abī Sufyān". In Bosworth, C. E.; van Donzel, E.; Heinrichs, W. P. & Pellat, Ch. (eds.). The Encyclopaedia of Islam, Second Edition. Volume VII: Mif–Naz. Leiden: E. J. Brill. pp. 263–268. ISBN 978-90-04-09419-2.
- Honigmann, E. (1987) [1927]. "AL-Thughūr". In Houtsma, Martijn Theodoor (ed.). E.J. Brill's First Encyclopaedia of Islam, 1913–1936, Volume VIII: Ṭa'if–Zūrkhāna. Leiden: BRILL. pp. 738–739. ISBN 90-04-08265-4.
- Kennedy, Hugh (2001). The Armies of the Caliphs: Military and Society in the Early Islamic State. London and New York: Routledge. ISBN 0-415-25093-5.
- Lammens, Henri & Bosworth, C. E. (1997). "Al-Shām — 2. History (a) To 1918". In Bosworth, C. E.; van Donzel, E.; Heinrichs, W. P. & Lecomte, G. (eds.). The Encyclopaedia of Islam, Second Edition. Volume IX: San–Sze. Leiden: E. J. Brill. pp. 262–273. ISBN 978-90-04-10422-8.
- Masalha, Nur (2018). Palestine: A Four Thousand Year History. Bloomsbury Academic. ISBN 978-1-78699-274-1.
- Meri, Josef W. (2006). Medieval Islamic Civilization: L-Z, index. Taylor & Francis. ISBN 978-0-415-96692-4.
- Salibi, K. S. (2003). A House of Many Mansions: The History of Lebanon Reconsidered. I.B.Tauris. ISBN 978-1-86064-912-7.
- Streck, Maximilian (1987) [1927]. "Al-ʿAwāṣim". In Houtsma, Martijn Theodoor (ed.). E.J. Brill's First Encyclopaedia of Islam, 1913–1936, Volume I: A–Bābā Beg. Leiden: BRILL. pp. 515–516. ISBN 90-04-08265-4.
- Walmsley, Alan G. (1987). The Administrative Structure and Urban Geography of the Jund of Filasṭīn and the Jund of al-Urdunn: The Cities and Districts of Palestine and East Jordan during the Early Islamic, ʿAbbāsid and Early Fāṭimid Periods (PhD). University of Sydney.
- Wheatley, Paul (2000). The Places Where Men Pray Together: Cities in Islamic Lands, Seventh Through the Tenth Centuries. University of Chicago Press. ISBN 978-0-226-89428-7.
