= Gaziantep Subregion =

Gaziantep Subregion Gaziantep Alt Bölgesi
- Subregion
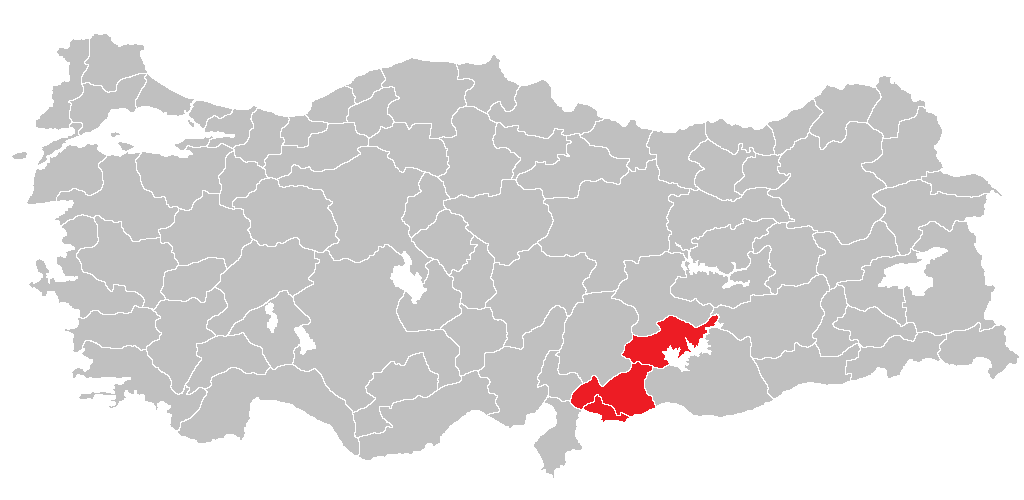
- Country: Turkey
- Region: Southeast Anatolia

Area
  - Subregion: 16,135 km^{2} (6,230 sq mi)

Population (2013)
  - Subregion: 2,570,208
  - Rank: 13th
  - Density: 159.29/km^{2} (412.57/sq mi)
  - Urban: 2,311,261
  - Rural: 258,947

The Gaziantep Subregion (Turkish: Gaziantep Alt Bölgesi) (TRC1) is a statistical subregion in Turkey.

== Provinces ==
- Gaziantep Province (TRC11)
- Adıyaman Province (TRC12)
- Kilis Province (TRC13)

== See also ==
- NUTS of Turkey

== Sources ==
- ESPON Database
