= Ulu Beden Tower =

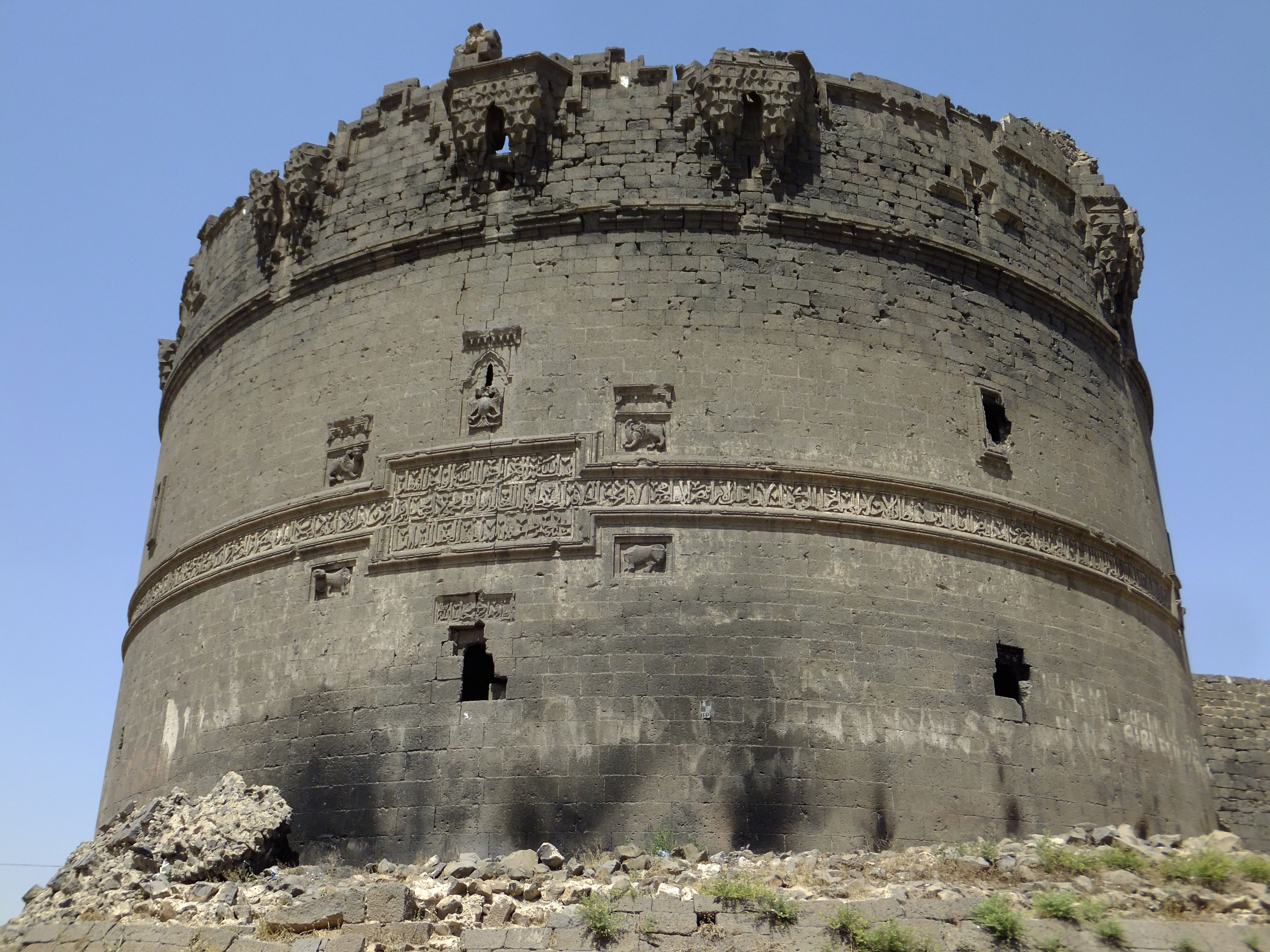

Religion
- Affiliation: Islam

Location
- Location: Diyarbakır, Turkey

Architecture
- Type: Mosque
- Date established: 1208

Ulu Beden Tower or Evli Beden Tower (Ulu Beden Burcu / Birca Hosta) is a black basalt stone tower in Diyarbakır. It was built in 1208 in honor of the leader of the Artukid Turkish dynasty, Melik Salih Mahmut and designed by the architect İbrahim Cafer. There is a thick band located halfway to the top, containing Artukid symbols, Islamic inscriptions and nature reliefs.
