= Southeast Anatolia region (statistical) =

Southeast Anatolia Region Güneydoğu Anadolu Bölgesi
- Region
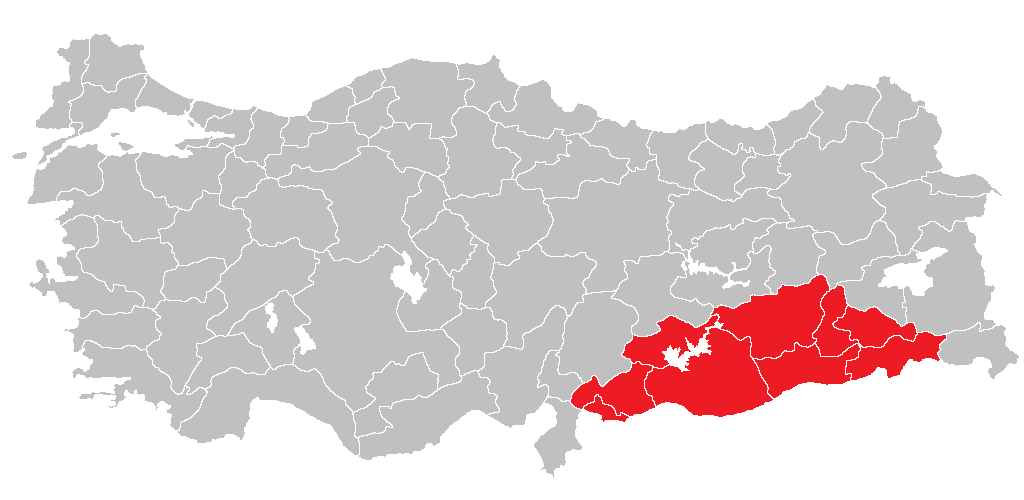
- Country: Turkey

Area
  - Region: 76,192 km^{2} (29,418 sq mi)

Population (2025)
  - Region: 9,587,992
  - Rank: 4th
  - Density: 125.84/km^{2} (325.92/sq mi)
  - Urban: 7,311,431
  - Rural: 2,276,561
- HDI (2023): 0.793 high · 11th

The Southeast Anatolia Region (Turkish: Güneydoğu Anadolu Bölgesi) (TRC) is a statistical region in Turkey.

== Subregions and provinces ==
- Gaziantep Subregion (TRC1)
  - Gaziantep Province (TRC11)
  - Adıyaman Province (TRC12)
  - Kilis Province (TRC13)
- Şanlıurfa Subregion (TRC2)
  - Şanlıurfa Province (TRC21)
  - Diyarbakır Province (TRC22)
- Mardin Subregion (TRC3)
  - Mardin Province (TRC31)
  - Batman Province (TRC32)
  - Şırnak Province (TRC33)
  - Siirt Province (TRC34)

== Population ==
Historical population
Year	Pop.	±% p.a.
1927	899,577	—
1935	1,084,701	+2.37%
1940	1,208,652	+2.19%
1945	1,171,946	−0.61%
1950	1,346,668	+2.82%
1955	1,774,580	+5.67%
1960	2,057,753	+3.01%
1965	2,367,740	+2.85%
1970	2,803,166	+3.43%
1975	3,212,531	+2.76%
1980	3,567,628	+2.12%
1985	4,303,567	+3.82%
1990	5,158,013	+3.69%
1997	6,128,973	+2.49%
2000	6,608,619	+2.54%
2007	7,170,849	+1.17%
2008	7,350,752	+2.51%
2009	7,462,893	+1.53%
2010	7,592,772	+1.74%
2011	7,816,173	+2.94%
2012	7,958,473	+1.82%
2013	8,096,352	+1.73%
2014	8,250,718	+1.91%
2015	8,385,540	+1.63%
2016	8,508,887	+1.47%
2017	8,665,165	+1.84%
2018	8,847,980	+2.11%
2019	8,975,618	+1.44%
2020	9,118,921	+1.60%
2021	9,210,440	+1.00%
2022	9,305,910	+1.04%
2023	9,410,624	+1.13%
2024	9,490,286	+0.85%
2025	9,587,992	+1.03%

=== Structure of the population ===
Structure of the population

Structure of the population (31.12.2024):

Age group	Male	Female	Total	Percent
Total	4,801,878	4,688,408	9,490,286	100
0–4	480,382	457,571	937,953	9.88
5–9	543,454	518,761	1,062,215	11.19
10–14	520,149	496,757	1,016,906	10.72
15–19	475,748	451,040	926,788	9.77
20–24	400,951	378,672	779,623	8.21
25–29	408,992	402,184	811,176	8.55
30–34	379,298	363,008	742,306	7.82
35–39	329,620	314,669	644,289	6.79
40–44	294,799	286,900	581,699	6.13
45–49	239,765	235,212	474,977	5.00
50–54	206,758	203,960	410,718	4.33
55–59	158,532	150,527	309,059	3.26
60–64	133,186	133,461	266,647	2.81
65–69	90,276	95,810	186,086	1.96
70–74	64,252	77,001	141,253	1.49
75–79	40,462	57,974	98,436	1.04
80–84	21,258	33,171	54,429	0.57
85–89	9,329	18,583	27,912	0.29
90+	4,667	13,147	17,814	0.19

Age group	Male	Female	Total	Percent
0–14	1,543,985	1,473,089	3,017,074	31.79
15–64	3,027,649	2,919,633	5,947,282	62.67
65+	230,244	295,686	525,930	5.54

Structure of the population (31.12.2025):

Age group	Male	Female	Total	Percent
Total	4,845,904	4,742,088	9,587,992	100
0–4	468,982	446,251	915,233	9.55
5–9	531,148	506,847	1,037,995	10.83
10–14	529,738	506,214	1,035,952	10.80
15–19	479,150	455,293	934,443	9.75
20–24	397,473	379,048	776,521	8.10
25–29	411,947	407,599	819,546	8.55
30–34	382,679	369,784	752,463	7.85
35–39	336,544	321,536	658,080	6.86
40–44	295,943	285,714	581,657	6.07
45–49	257,837	253,976	511,813	5.34
50–54	208,827	206,977	415,804	4.34
55–59	154,035	146,184	300,219	3.13
60–64	149,810	147,447	297,257	3.10
65–69	89,701	97,071	186,772	1.95
70–74	71,499	82,533	154,032	1.61
75–79	43,311	61,640	104,951	1.09
80–84	22,712	34,826	57,538	0.60
85–89	10,118	19,693	29,811	0.31
90+	4,450	13,455	17,905	0.19

Age group	Male	Female	Total	Percent
0–14	1,529,868	1,459,312	2,989,180	31.18
15–64	3,074,245	2,973,558	6,047,803	63.08
65+	241,791	309,218	551,009	5.75

== Internal immigration ==
Between December 31, 2024 and December 31, 2025
Region	Population	Immigrants	Emigrants	Net immigrants	Net immigration rate
Southeast Anatolia	9,587,992	181,061	213,054	-31,993	-3.33

=== State register location of Southeast Anatolia residents ===
As of December 31, 2025
Region	Population	Percentage
Istanbul	5,805	0.1
West Marmara	8,402	0.1
Aegean	30,220	0.3
East Marmara	12,856	0.1
West Anatolia	27,332	0.3
Mediterranean	221,848	2.3
Central Anatolia	47,044	0.5
West Black Sea	36,679	0.4
East Black Sea	17,026	0.2
Northeast Anatolia	27,326	0.3
Central East Anatolia	158,901	1.6
Southeast Anatolia	8,965,134	93.5
Foreign National	29,419	0.3
Total	9,587,992	100

== Marital status of 15+ population by gender ==
As of December 31, 2025
Gender	Never married	%	Married	%	Divorced	%	Spouse died	%	Total
Male	1,269,971	38.3	1,946,025	58.7	63,819	1.9	36,221	1.1	3,316,036
Female	1,045,654	31.9	1,941,470	59.1	85,302	2.6	210,350	6.4	3,282,776
Total	2,315,625	35.1	3,887,495	58.9	149,121	2.3	246,571	3.7	6,598,812

== Education status of 15+ population by gender ==
As of December 31, 2025
Gender	Illiterate	%	Literate with no diploma	%	Primary school	%	Primary education	%	Middle school	%	High school	%	College or university	%	Master's degree	%	Doctorate	%	Unknown	%	Total
Male	40,991	1.2	87,465	2.6	358,069	10.8	303,791	9.2	928,720	28.1	995,075	30.1	496,038	15.0	68,863	2.1	7,999	0.2	16,002	0.5	3,303,013
Female	304,293	9.3	279,766	8.6	521,682	16.0	197,975	6.1	781,971	23.9	687,579	21.0	431,336	13.2	41,548	1.3	4,143	0.1	19,727	0.6	3,270,020
All genders	345,284	5.3	367,231	5.6	879,751	13.4	501,766	7.6	1,710,691	26.0	1,682,654	25.6	927,374	14.1	110,411	1.7	12,142	0.2	35,729	0.5	6,573,033

== See also ==
- NUTS of Turkey

== Sources ==
- ESPON Database
