= Şanlıurfa Subregion =

Şanlıurfa Subregion Şanlıurfa Alt Bölgesi
- Subregion
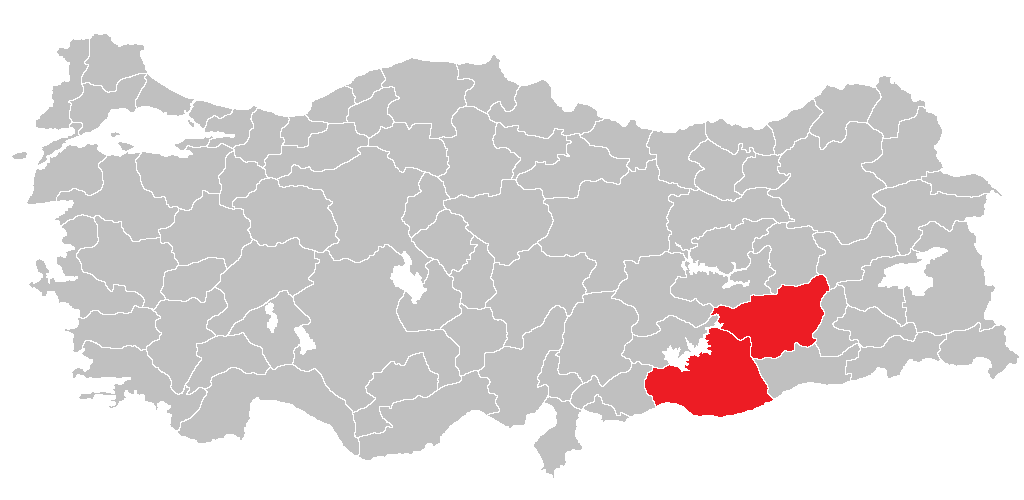
- Country: Turkey
- Region: Southeast Anatolia

Area
  - Subregion: 33,939 km^{2} (13,104 sq mi)

Population (2013)
  - Subregion: 3,409,417
  - Rank: 7th
  - Density: 100.46/km^{2} (260.18/sq mi)
  - Urban: 3,409,417
  - Rural: 0

The Şanlıurfa Subregion (Turkish: Şanlıurfa Alt Bölgesi) (TRC2) is a statistical subregion in Turkey.

== Provinces ==
- Şanlıurfa Province (TRC21)
- Diyarbakır Province (TRC22)

== See also ==
- NUTS of Turkey

== Sources ==
- ESPON Database
